= List of Shorea species =

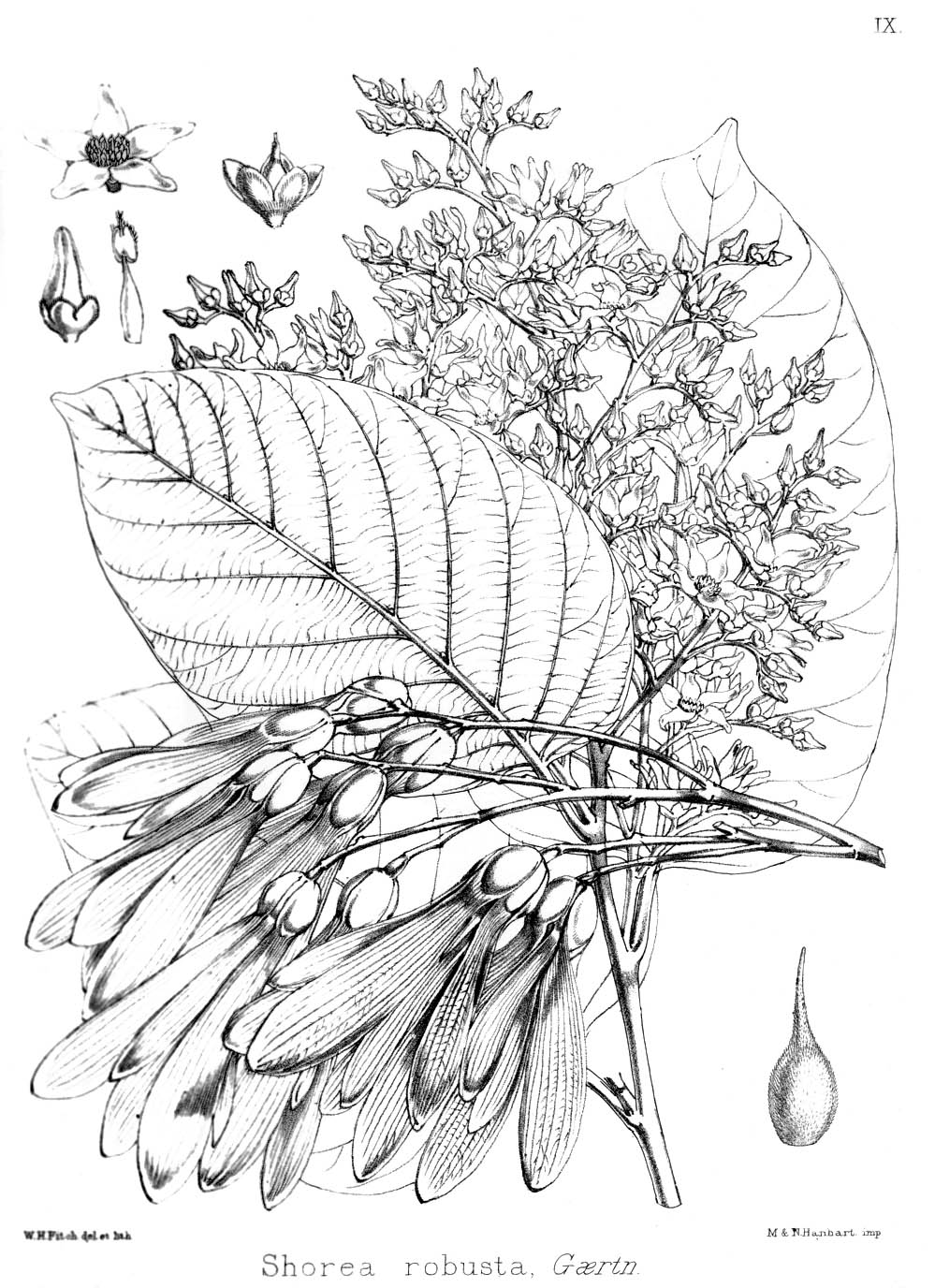
Shorea robusta from "Illustrations of the Forest Flora of North-West and Central India", 1874

Shorea is a large genus in family Dipterocarpaceae, and has been subject to substantial revision over the decades. Prior to 2022 the genus included nearly 200 genera.

Based on phylogenomic analyses showing that genus Shorea sensu Ashton (1982) was polyphyletic, in 2022 Ashton and Heckenhauer proposed reviving the former genera Doona Thwaites, Pentacme A.DC., and Richetia F.Heim, raising Shorea sections Anthoshorea and Neohopea to genus rank, and combining Shorea sections Brachyptera, Mutica, Ovalis, Pachycarpae, and Rubella into the new genus Rubroshorea, with two sections, Shorea and Barbata, remaining in genus Shorea. Plants of the World Online currently recognizes Anthoshorea, Doona, Neohopea, Pentacme, Richetia, and Rubroshorea as separate genera.

== Shorea classification (Ashton et al. 2022) ==
Plants of the World Online currently accepts 47 species. Ashton et al. (2022) accept two sections, Barbata and Shorea.

Species	Section
Species	Shorea altopoensis Pierre
Shorea arsorianoi H.G.Gut., Rojo & Madulid	
Shorea asahi P.S.Ashton	Barbata
Shorea astylosa Foxw.	Shorea
Shorea atrinervosa Symington	Shorea
Shorea biawak P.S.Ashton	Barbata
Shorea brunnescens P.S.Ashton	Shorea
Shorea calcicola P.S.Ashton	Shorea
Shorea ciliata King	Shorea
Shorea collina Ridl.	Shorea
Shorea crassa P.S.Ashton	Shorea
Shorea domatiosa P.S.Ashton	Shorea
Shorea dyeri Thwaites ex Trimen	Shorea
Shorea exelliptica Meijer	Shorea
Shorea falcata J.E.Vidal	Shorea
Shorea falcifera Dyer ex Brandis	Shorea
Shorea falciferoides Foxw.	Shorea
Shorea foxworthyi Symington	
Shorea geniculata Symington ex P.S.Ashton	Shorea
Shorea glauca King	Barbata
Shorea guiso (Blanco) Blume	Shorea
Shorea havilandii Brandis	Shorea
Shorea hypoleuca Meijer	Shorea
Shorea inappendiculata Burck	Shorea
Shorea ladiana P.S.Ashton	Barbata
Shorea laevis Ridl.	Barbata
Shorea leptoderma Meijer	Shorea
Shorea lissophylla Thwaites	Shorea
Shorea lumutensis Symington	Shorea
Shorea lunduensis P.S.Ashton	Shorea
Shorea malibato Foxw.	Shorea
Shorea materialis Ridl.	Shorea
Shorea maxwelliana King	Barbata
Shorea micans P.S.Ashton	Barbata
Shorea oblongifolia Thwaites	Shorea
Shorea obscura Meijer	Shorea
Shorea obtusa Wall. ex Blume	Shorea
Shorea ochrophloia Symington	Shorea
Shorea pallescens P.S.Ashton	Shorea
Shorea robusta C.F.Gaertn.	Shorea
Shorea scrobiculata Burck	Shorea
Shorea seminis (de Vriese) Slooten	Shorea
Shorea submontana Symington	Shorea
Shorea sumatrana (Slooten ex Thorenaar) Desch	Shorea
Shorea superba Symington	Shorea
Shorea thorelii Pierre ex Laness.	Shorea
Shorea tumbugaia Roxb.	Shorea

== Shorea classification (Ashton et al. 2004) ==
This is a complete listing of Shorea species accepted by Plants of the World Online in July 2019. The subgeneric classification follows Ashton (2004) and covers only species native to northern Borneo, with some Sri Lankan species added. The timber groups classified according to the system proposed by Symington in the early 1940s.

Species	Ashton (2004)		Groups	Accepted names per Plants of the World Online, October 2024
Species	sections	subsections	Groups	Accepted names per Plants of the World Online, October 2024
Shorea affinis (Thwaites) P.S.Ashton	Doona			Doona affinis Thwaites
Shorea congestiflora (Thwaites) P.S.Ashton	Doona			Doona congestiflora Thwaites
Shorea cordifolia (Thwaites) P.S.Ashton	Doona			Doona cordifolia Thwaites
Shorea disticha (Thwaites) P.S.Ashton	Doona			Doona disticha (Thwaites) Pierre
Shorea megistophylla P.S.Ashton	Doona			Doona macrophylla Thwaites
Shorea trapezifolia (Thwaites) P.S.Ashton	Doona			Doona trapezifolia Thwaites
Shorea zeylanica (Thwaites) P.S.Ashton	Doona			Doona zeylanica Thwaites
Shorea contorta S.Vidal	Pentacme			Pentacme contorta (S.Vidal) Merr. & Rolfe
Shorea siamensis Miq.	Pentacme			Pentacme siamensis (Miq.) Kurz
Shorea agami P.S.Ashton	Anthoshorea		white meranti group	Anthoshorea agami (P.S.Ashton) P.S.Ashton & J.Heck.
Shorea bracteolata Dyer	Anthoshorea		white meranti group	Anthoshorea bracteolata (Dyer) P.S.Ashton & J.Heck.
Shorea confusa P.S.Ashton	Anthoshorea		white meranti group	Anthoshorea confusa (P.S.Ashton) P.S.Ashton & J.Heck.
Shorea cordata P.S.Ashton	Anthoshorea		white meranti group	Anthoshorea cordata (P.S.Ashton) P.S.Ashton & J.Heck.
Shorea dealbata Foxw.	Anthoshorea		white meranti group	Anthoshorea dealbata (Foxw.) P.S.Ashton & J.Heck.
Shorea gratissima (Wall. ex. Kurz) Dyer	Anthoshorea		white meranti group	Anthoshorea gratissima (Wall. ex Kurz) P.S.Ashton & J.Heck.
Shorea lamellata Foxw.	Anthoshorea		white meranti group	Anthoshorea lamellata (Foxw.) P.S.Ashton & J.Heck.
Shorea ochracea Symington	Anthoshorea		white meranti group	Anthoshorea ochracea (Symington) P.S.Ashton & J.Heck.
Shorea resinosa Foxw.	Anthoshorea		white meranti group	Anthoshorea resinosa (Foxw.) P.S.Ashton & J.Heck.
Shorea symingtonii G.H.S.Wood	Anthoshorea		white meranti group	Anthoshorea symingtonii (G.H.S.Wood) P.S.Ashton & J.Heck.
Shorea virescens Parijs	Anthoshorea		white meranti group	Anthoshorea virescens (Parijs) P.S.Ashton & J.Heck.
Shorea isoptera P.S.Ashton	Neohopea		selangan batu group	Neohopea isoptera (P.S.Ashton) P.S.Ashton & J.Heck.
Shorea asahi P.S.Ashton	Shorea	Barbata	selangan batu group	Shorea asahi P.S.Ashton
Shorea biawak P.S.Ashton	Shorea	Barbata	selangan batu group	Shorea biawak P.S.Ashton
Shorea ladiana P.S.Ashton	Shorea	Barbata	selangan batu group	Shorea ladiana P.S.Ashton
Shorea laevis Ridl.	Shorea	Barbata	selangan batu group	Shorea laevis Ridl.
Shorea maxwelliana King	Shorea	Barbata	selangan batu group	Shorea maxwelliana King
Shorea micans P.S.Ashton	Shorea	Barbata	selangan batu group	Shorea micans P.S.Ashton
Shorea atrinervosa Symington	Shorea	Shorea	selangan batu group	Shorea atrinervosa Symington
Shorea brunnescens P.S.Ashton	Shorea	Shorea	selangan batu group	Shorea brunnescens P.S.Ashton
Shorea calcicola P.S.Ashton	Shorea	Shorea	selangan batu group	Shorea calcicola P.S.Ashton
Shorea crassa P.S.Ashton	Shorea	Shorea	selangan batu group	Shorea crassa P.S.Ashton
Shorea domatiosa P.S.Ashton	Shorea	Shorea	selangan batu group	Shorea domatiosa P.S.Ashton
Shorea exelliptica Meijer	Shorea	Shorea	selangan batu group	Shorea exelliptica Meijer
Shorea falcifera Dyer ex. Brandis	Shorea	Shorea	selangan batu group	Shorea falcifera Dyer ex. Brandis
Shorea falciferoides Foxw.	Shorea	Shorea	selangan batu group	Shorea falciferoides Foxw.
Shorea foxworthyi Symington	Shorea	Shorea	selangan batu group	Shorea foxworthyi Symington
Shorea geniculata Symington ex. P.S.Ashton	Shorea	Shorea	selangan batu group	Shorea geniculata Symington ex. P.S.Ashton
Shorea guiso (Blanco) Blume	Shorea	Shorea	selangan batu group	Shorea guiso (Blanco) Blume
Shorea havilandii Brandis	Shorea	Shorea	selangan batu group	Shorea havilandii Brandis
Shorea hypoleuca Meijer	Shorea	Shorea	selangan batu group	Shorea hypoleuca Meijer
Shorea inappendiculata Burck	Shorea	Shorea	selangan batu group	Shorea inappendiculata Burck
Shorea lunduensis P.S.Ashton	Shorea	Shorea	selangan batu group	Shorea lunduensis P.S.Ashton
Shorea materialis Ridl.	Shorea	Shorea	selangan batu group	Shorea materialis Ridl.
Shorea obscura Meijer	Shorea	Shorea	selangan batu group	Shorea obscura Meijer
Shorea scrobiculata Burck	Shorea	Shorea	selangan batu group	Shorea scrobiculata Burck
Shorea seminis (de Viese) Slooten	Shorea	Shorea	selangan batu group	Shorea seminis (de Viese) Slooten
Shorea superba Symington	Shorea	Shorea	selangan batu group	Shorea superba Symington
Shorea almon Foxw.	Brachypterae		red meranti group	Rubroshorea almon (Foxw.) P.S.Ashton & J.Heck.
Shorea andulensis P.S.Ashton	Brachypterae		red meranti group	Rubroshorea andulensis (P.S.Ashton) P.S.Ashton & J.Heck.
Shorea bullata P.S.Ashton	Brachypterae		red meranti group	Rubroshorea bullata (P.S.Ashton) P.S.Ashton & J.Heck.
Shorea carapae P.S.Ashton	Brachypterae		red meranti group	Rubroshorea carapae (P.S.Ashton) P.S.Ashton & J.Heck.
Shorea coriacea Burck	Brachypterae		red meranti group	Rubroshorea coriacea (Burck) P.S.Ashton & J.Heck.
Shorea fallax Meijer	Brachypterae		red meranti group	Rubroshorea fallax (Meijer) P.S.Ashton & J.Heck.
Shorea flaviflora Wood ex. P.S.Ashton	Brachypterae		red meranti group	Rubroshorea flaviflora (G.H.S.Wood ex P.S.Ashton) P.S.Ashton & J.Heck.
Shorea flemmichii Symington	Brachypterae		red meranti group	Rubroshorea flemmichii (Symington) P.S.Ashton & J.Heck.
Shorea inaequilateralis Symington	Brachypterae		red meranti group	Rubroshorea inaequilateralis (Symington) P.S.Ashton & J.Heck.
Shorea johorensis Foxw.	Brachypterae		red meranti group	Rubroshorea johorensis (Foxw.) P.S.Ashton & J.Heck.
Shorea kunstleri King	Brachypterae		red meranti group	Rubroshorea kunstleri (King) P.S.Ashton & J.Heck.
Shorea monticola P.S.Ashton	Brachypterae		red meranti group	Rubroshorea monticola (P.S.Ashton) P.S.Ashton & J.Heck.
Shorea pachyphylla Ridl. ex. Symington	Brachypterae		red meranti group	Rubroshorea pachyphylla (Ridl. ex Symington) P.S.Ashton & J.Heck.
Shorea palembanica Miq.	Brachypterae		red meranti group	Rubroshorea palembanica (Miq.) P.S.Ashton & J.Heck.
Shorea parvistipulata F.Heim	Brachypterae		red meranti group	Rubroshorea parvistipulata (F.Heim) P.S.Ashton & J.Heck.
Shorea pauciflora King	Brachypterae		red meranti group	Rubroshorea pauciflora (King) P.S.Ashton & J.Heck.
Shorea platyclados Slooten ex. Endert	Brachypterae		red meranti group	Rubroshorea platyclados (Slooten ex Endert) P.S.Ashton & J.Heck.
Shorea pubistyla P.S.Ashton	Brachypterae		red meranti group	Rubroshorea pubistyla (P.S.Ashton) P.S.Ashton & J.Heck.
Shorea scaberrima Burck	Brachypterae		red meranti group	Rubroshorea scaberrima (Burck) P.S.Ashton & J.Heck.
Shorea smithiana Symington	Brachypterae		red meranti group	Rubroshorea smithiana (Symington) P.S.Ashton & J.Heck.
Shorea venulosa G.H.S.Wood ex. Meijer	Brachypterae		red meranti group	Rubroshorea venulosa (G.H.S.Wood ex Meijer) P.S.Ashton & J.Heck.
Shorea waltoni G.H.S.Wood ex. Meijer	Brachypterae		red meranti group	Rubroshorea waltoni (G.H.S.Wood ex Meijer) P.S.Ashton & J.Heck.
Shorea acuta P.S.Ashton	Mutica	Auriculatae	red meranti group	Rubroshorea acuta (P.S.Ashton) P.S.Ashton & J.Heck.
Shorea ferruginea Dyer ex. Brandis	Mutica	Auriculatae	red meranti group	Rubroshorea ferruginea (Dyer ex Brandis) P.S.Ashton & J.Heck.
Shorea macroptera Dyer	Mutica	Auriculatae	red meranti group	Rubroshorea macroptera (Dyer) P.S.Ashton & J.Heck.
Shorea myrionerva Symington ex. P.S.Ashton	Mutica	Auriculatae	red meranti group	Rubroshorea myrionerva (Symington ex P.S.Ashton) P.S.Ashton & J.Heck.
Shorea sagittata P.S.Ashton	Mutica	Auriculatae	red meranti group	Rubroshorea sagittata (P.S.Ashton) P.S.Ashton & J.Heck.
Shorea slootenii Wood ex. P.S.Ashton	Mutica	Auriculatae	red meranti group	Rubroshorea slootenii (P.S.Ashton) P.S.Ashton & J.Heck.
Shorea argentifolia Symington	Mutica	Mutica	red meranti group	Rubroshorea argentifolia (Symington) P.S.Ashton & J.Heck.
Shorea curtisii Dyer ex. Brandis	Mutica	Mutica	red meranti group	Rubroshorea curtisii (Dyer ex King) P.S.Ashton & J.Heck.
Shorea dasyphylla Foxw.	Mutica	Mutica	red meranti group	Rubroshorea dasyphylla (Foxw.) P.S.Ashton & J.Heck.
Shorea foraminifera P.S.Ashton	Mutica	Mutica	red meranti group	Rubroshorea foraminifera (P.S.Ashton) P.S.Ashton & J.Heck.
Shorea hemsleyana (King) King ex. Foxw.	Mutica	Mutica	red meranti group	Rubroshorea hemsleyana (King) P.S.Ashton & J.Heck.
Shorea leprosula Miq.	Mutica	Mutica	red meranti group	Rubroshorea leprosula (Miq.) P.S.Ashton & J.Heck.
Shorea macrantha Brandis	Mutica	Mutica	red meranti group	Rubroshorea macrantha (Brandis) P.S.Ashton & J.Heck.
Shorea ovata Dyer ex. Brandis	Mutica	Mutica	red meranti group	Rubroshorea ovata (Dyer ex Brandis) P.S.Ashton & J.Heck.
Shorea pallidifolia P.S.Ashton	Mutica	Mutica	red meranti group	Rubroshorea pallidifolia (P.S.Ashton) P.S.Ashton & J.Heck.
Shorea parvifolia Dyer	Mutica	Mutica	red meranti group	Rubroshorea parvifolia (Dyer) P.S.Ashton & J.Heck.
Shorea platycarpa F.Heim	Mutica	Mutica	red meranti group	Rubroshorea platycarpa (F.Heim) P.S.Ashton & J.Heck.
Shorea quadrinervis Slooten	Mutica	Mutica	red meranti group	Rubroshorea quadrinervis (Slooten) P.S.Ashton & J.Heck.
Shorea retusa Meijer	Mutica	Mutica	red meranti group	Rubroshorea retusa (Meijer) P.S.Ashton & J.Heck.
Shorea revoluta P.S.Ashton	Mutica	Mutica	red meranti group	Rubroshorea revoluta (P.S.Ashton) P.S.Ashton & J.Heck.
Shorea rubra P.S.Ashton	Mutica	Mutica	red meranti group	Rubroshorea rubra (P.S.Ashton) P.S.Ashton & J.Heck.
Shorea rugosa F.Heim	Mutica	Mutica	red meranti group	Rubroshorea rugosa (F.Heim) P.S.Ashton & J.Heck.
Shorea scabrida Symington	Mutica	Mutica	red meranti group	Rubroshorea scabrida (Symington) P.S.Ashton & J.Heck.
Shorea teysmanniana Dyer ex. Brandis	Mutica	Mutica	red meranti group	Rubroshorea teysmanniana (Dyer ex Brandis) P.S.Ashton & J.Heck.
Shorea uliginosa Foxw.	Mutica	Mutica	red meranti group	Rubroshorea uliginosa (Foxw.) P.S.Ashton & J.Heck.
Shorea ovalis (Korth.) Blume	Ovalis		red meranti group	Rubroshorea ovalis (Korth.) P.S.Ashton & J.Heck.
Shorea amplexicaulis P.S.Ashton	Pachycarpae		red meranti group	Rubroshorea amplexicaulis (P.S.Ashton) P.S.Ashton & J.Heck.
Shorea beccariana Burck	Pachycarpae		red meranti group	Rubroshorea beccariana (Burck) P.S.Ashton & J.Heck.
Shorea macrophylla (de Vriese) P.S.Ashton	Pachycarpae		red meranti group	Rubroshorea macrophylla (de Vriese) P.S.Ashton & J.Heck.
Shorea mecistopteryx Ridl.	Pachycarpae		red meranti group	Rubroshorea mecistopteryx (Ridl.) P.S.Ashton & J.Heck.
Shorea pilosa P.S.Ashton	Pachycarpae		red meranti group	Rubroshorea pilosa (P.S.Ashton) P.S.Ashton & J.Heck.
Shorea pinanga Scheff.	Pachycarpae		red meranti group	Rubroshorea pinanga (Scheff.) P.S.Ashton & J.Heck.
Shorea praestans P.S.Ashton	Pachycarpae		red meranti group	Rubroshorea praestans (P.S.Ashton) P.S.Ashton & J.Heck.
Shorea rotundifolia P.S.Ashton	Pachycarpae		red meranti group	Rubroshorea rotundifolia (P.S.Ashton) P.S.Ashton & J.Heck.
Shorea splendida (de Vriese) P.S.Ashton	Pachycarpae		red meranti group	Rubroshorea splendida (de Vriese) P.S.Ashton & J.Heck.
Shorea stenoptera Burck	Pachycarpae		red meranti group	Rubroshorea stenoptera (Burck) P.S.Ashton & J.Heck.
Shorea woodii P.S.Ashton	Pachycarpae		red meranti group	Rubroshorea woodii (P.S.Ashton) P.S.Ashton & J.Heck.
Shorea albida Symington	Rubella		red meranti group	Rubroshorea albida (Symington) P.S.Ashton & J.Heck.
Shorea dispar P.S.Ashton	Rubella		red meranti group	Rubroshorea dispar (P.S.Ashton) P.S.Ashton & J.Heck.
Shorea elliptica Burck	Rubella		red meranti group	Rubroshorea elliptica (Burck) P.S.Ashton & J.Heck.
Shorea rubella P.S.Ashton	Rubella		red meranti group	Rubroshorea rubella (P.S.Ashton) P.S.Ashton & J.Heck.
Shorea acuminatissima Symington	Richetioides		yellow meranti group	Richetia acuminatissima (Symington) P.S.Ashton & J.Heck.
Shorea alutacea P.S.Ashton	Richetioides		yellow meranti group	Richetia alutacea (P.S.Ashton) P.S.Ashton & J.Heck.
Shorea angustifolia P.S.Ashton	Richetioides		yellow meranti group	Richetia angustifolia (P.S.Ashton) P.S.Ashton & J.Heck.
Shorea bakoensis P.S.Ashton	Richetioides		yellow meranti group	Richetia bakoensis (P.S.Ashton) P.S.Ashton & J.Heck.
Shorea balanocarpoides Symington	Richetioides		yellow meranti group	Richetia balanocarpoides (Symington) P.S.Ashton & J.Heck.
Shorea chaiana P.S.Ashton	Richetioides		yellow meranti group	Richetia chaiana (P.S.Ashton) P.S.Ashton & J.Heck.
Shorea collaris Slooten	Richetioides		yellow meranti group	Richetia collaris (Slooten) P.S.Ashton & J.Heck.
Shorea cuspidata P.S.Ashton	Richetioides		yellow meranti group	Richetia cuspidata (P.S.Ashton) P.S.Ashton & J.Heck.
Shorea faguetiana F.Heim	Richetioides		yellow meranti group	Richetia faguetiana (F.Heim) P.S.Ashton & J.Heck.
Shorea faguetioides P.S.Ashton	Richetioides		yellow meranti group	Richetia faguetioides (P.S.Ashton) P.S.Ashton & J.Heck.
Shorea gibbosa Brandis	Richetioides		yellow meranti group	Richetia gibbosa (Brandis) P.S.Ashton & J.Heck.
Shorea hopeifolia (F.Heim) Symington	Richetioides		yellow meranti group	Richetia hopeifolia (F.Heim) P.S.Ashton & J.Heck.
Shorea iliasii P.S.Ashton	Richetioides		yellow meranti group	Richetia iliasii (P.S.Ashton) P.S.Ashton & J.Heck.
Shorea induplicata Slooten	Richetioides		yellow meranti group	Richetia induplicata (Slooten) P.S.Ashton & J.Heck.
Shorea kudatensis G.H.S.Wood ex Meijer	Richetioides		yellow meranti group	Richetia kudatensis (G.H.S.Wood ex Meijer) P.S.Ashton & J.Heck.
Shorea laxa Slooten	Richetioides		yellow meranti group	Richetia laxa (Slooten) P.S.Ashton & J.Heck.
Shorea longiflora (Brandis) Symington	Richetioides		yellow meranti group	Richetia longiflora (Brandis) P.S.Ashton & J.Heck.
Shorea longisperma Roxb.	Richetioides		yellow meranti group	Richetia longisperma (Roxb.) P.S.Ashton & J.Heck.
Shorea macrobalanos P.S.Ashton	Richetioides		yellow meranti group	Richetia macrobalanos (P.S.Ashton) P.S.Ashton & J.Heck.
Shorea mujongensis P.S.Ashton	Richetioides		yellow meranti group	Richetia mujongensis (P.S.Ashton) P.S.Ashton & J.Heck.
Shorea multiflora (Burck) Symington	Richetioides		yellow meranti group	Richetia multiflora (Burck) P.S.Ashton & J.Heck.
Shorea obovoidea Slooten	Richetioides		yellow meranti group	Richetia obovoidea (Slooten) P.S.Ashton & J.Heck.
Shorea patoiensis P.S.Ashton	Richetioides		yellow meranti group	Richetia patoiensis (P.S.Ashton) P.S.Ashton & J.Heck.
Shorea peltata Symington	Richetioides		yellow meranti group	Richetia peltata (Symington) P.S.Ashton & J.Heck.
Shorea polyandra P.S.Ashton	Richetioides		yellow meranti group	Richetia polyandra (P.S.Ashton) P.S.Ashton & J.Heck.
Shorea richetia Symington	Richetioides		yellow meranti group	Richetia coriacea F.Heim
Shorea subcylindrica Slooten	Richetioides		yellow meranti group	Richetia subcylindrica (Slooten) P.S.Ashton & J.Heck.
Shorea tenuiramulosa P.S.Ashton	Richetioides		yellow meranti group	Richetia tenuiramulosa (P.S.Ashton) P.S.Ashton & J.Heck.
Shorea xanthophylla Symington	Richetioides		yellow meranti group	Richetia xanthophylla (Symington) P.S.Ashton & J.Heck.
Shorea acuminata Dyer				Rubroshorea acuminata (Dyer) P.S.Ashton & J.Heck.
Shorea altopoensis Pierre				Shorea altopoensis Pierre
Shorea arsorianoi H.G.Gut., Rojo & Madulid				Shorea arsorianoi H.G.Gut., Rojo & Madulid
Shorea assamica Dyer				Anthoshorea assamica (Dyer) P.S.Ashton & J.Heck.
Shorea astylosa Foxw.				Shorea astylosa Foxw.
Shorea bentongensis Foxw.				Anthoshorea bentongensis (Foxw.) P.S.Ashton & J.Heck.
Shorea blumutensis Foxw.				Richetia blumutensis (Foxw.) P.S.Ashton & J.Heck.
Shorea ciliata King				Shorea ciliata King
Shorea collina Ridl.				Shorea collina Ridl.
Shorea conica Slooten				Richetia conica (Slooten) P.S.Ashton & J.Heck.
Shorea dyeri Thwaites ex Trimen				Shorea dyeri Thwaites ex Trimen
Shorea falcata J.E.Vidal				Shorea falcata J.E.Vidal
Shorea farinosa C.E.C.Fisch.				Anthoshorea farinosa (C.E.C.Fisch.) P.S.Ashton & J.Heck.
Shorea gardneri (Thwaites) P.S.Ashton				Doona gardneri Thwaites
Shorea glauca King				Shorea glauca King
Shorea henryana Pierre ex Laness.				Anthoshorea henryana (Pierre ex Laness.) P.S.Ashton & J.Heck.
Shorea hulanidda Kosterm.				Anthoshorea hulanidda (Kosterm.) P.S.Ashton & J.Heck.
Shorea hypochra Hance				Anthoshorea hypochra (Hance) P.S.Ashton & J.Heck.
Shorea javanica Koord. & Valeton				Anthoshorea javanica (Koord. & Valeton) P.S.Ashton & J.Heck.
Shorea kuantanensis P.S.Ashton				Richetia kuantanensis (P.S.Ashton) P.S.Ashton & J.Heck.
Shorea lepidota (Korth.) Blume				Rubroshorea lepidota (Korth.) P.S.Ashton & J.Heck.
Shorea leptoderma Meijer				Shorea leptoderma Meijer
Shorea lissophylla Thwaites				Shorea lissophylla Thwaites
Shorea lumutensis Symington				Shorea lumutensis Symington
Shorea malibato Foxw.				Shorea malibato Foxw.
Shorea maxima (King) Symington				Richetia maxima (King) P.S.Ashton & J.Heck.
Shorea montigena Slooten				Anthoshorea montigena (Slooten) P.S.Ashton & J.Heck.
Shorea negrosensis Foxw.				Rubroshorea negrosensis (Foxw.) P.S.Ashton & J.Heck.
Shorea oblongifolia Thwaites				Shorea oblongifolia Thwaites
Shorea obtusa Wall.				Shorea obtusa Wall.
Shorea ochrophloia Symington				Shorea ochrophloia Symington
Shorea ovalifolia (Thwaites) P.S.Ashton				Doona ovalifolia Thwaites
Shorea pallescens P.S.Ashton				Shorea pallescens P.S.Ashton
Shorea palosapis (Blanco) Merr.				Rubroshorea palosapis (Blanco) P.S.Ashton & J.Heck.
Shorea polita S.Vidal				Anthoshorea polita (S.Vidal) P.S.Ashton & J.Heck.
Shorea polysperma (Blanco) Merr.				Rubroshorea polysperma (Blanco) P.S.Ashton & J.Heck.
Shorea retinodes Slooten				Anthoshorea retinodes (Slooten) P.S.Ashton & J.Heck.
Shorea robusta C.F.Gaertn.				Shorea robusta C.F.Gaertn.
Shorea roxburghii G.Don				Anthoshorea roxburghii (G.Don) P.S.Ashton & J.Heck.
Shorea selanica (Lam.) Blume				Rubroshorea selanica (Valmont) P.S.Ashton & J.Heck.
Shorea singkawang (Miq.) Burck				Rubroshorea singkawang (Miq.) P.S.Ashton & J.Heck.
Shorea squamata (Turcz.) Dyer ex S.Vidal				Rubroshorea palosapis (Blanco) P.S.Ashton & J.Heck.
Shorea stipularis Thwaites				Anthoshorea stipularis (Thwaites) P.S.Ashton & J.Heck.
Shorea submontana Symington				Shorea submontana Symington
Shorea sumatrana (Slooten ex Thorenaar) Desch				Shorea sumatrana (Slooten ex Thorenaar) Desch
Shorea thorelii Pierre ex. Laness				Shorea thorelii Pierre ex. Laness
Shorea tumbuggaia Roxb.				Shorea tumbuggaia Roxb.
Shorea wangtianshuea Y.K.Yang & J.K.Wu				Parashorea chinensis Wang Hsie
Shorea worthingtonii P.S.Ashton				Doona venulosa Thwaites
