= Shorea falciferoides =

Conservation status
- Vulnerable (IUCN 3.1)

Scientific classification
- Kingdom: Plantae
- Clade: Tracheophytes
- Clade: Angiosperms
- Clade: Eudicots
- Clade: Rosids
- Order: Malvales
- Family: Dipterocarpaceae
- Genus: Shorea
- Species: S. falciferoides

Binomial name
- Shorea falciferoides Foxw.

Species of flowering plant

Shorea falciferoides, also known as yakal yamban in the Philippines, is a species of plant in the family Dipterocarpaceae. It is native to Borneo and the Philippines. It is threatened by habitat loss.

== See also ==
- List of Shorea species
