= Rubroshorea bullata =

Conservation status
- Vulnerable (IUCN 3.1)

Scientific classification
- Kingdom: Plantae
- Clade: Tracheophytes
- Clade: Angiosperms
- Clade: Eudicots
- Clade: Rosids
- Order: Malvales
- Family: Dipterocarpaceae
- Genus: Rubroshorea
- Species: R. bullata

Binomial name
- Rubroshorea bullata (P.S.Ashton) P.S.Ashton & J.Heck.

Synonyms
- Shorea bullata P.S.Ashton

Species of tree

Rubroshorea bullata (called, along with some other species in the genus Rubroshorea, dark red meranti) is a species of plant in the family Dipterocarpaceae. It is a tree endemic to Brunei and northeastern Sarawak on the island of Borneo.

The species was first described as Shorea bullata by Peter Shaw Ashton in 1962. In 2022 Ashton and Jaqueline Heckenhauer placed the species in genus Rubroshorea as R. bullata.

== See also ==
- List of Shorea species
