= Rubroshorea andulensis =

Conservation status
- Vulnerable (IUCN 3.1)

Scientific classification
- Kingdom: Plantae
- Clade: Tracheophytes
- Clade: Angiosperms
- Clade: Eudicots
- Clade: Rosids
- Order: Malvales
- Family: Dipterocarpaceae
- Genus: Rubroshorea
- Species: R. andulensis

Binomial name
- Rubroshorea andulensis (P.S.Ashton) P.S.Ashton & J.Heck.

Synonyms
- Shorea andulensis P.S.Ashton

Species of tree

Rubroshorea andulensis (also called light red meranti) is a species of tree in the family Dipterocarpaceae. It is endemic to northern and northwestern Borneo.

Rubroshorea andulensis is a large tree, growing up to 45 metres tall.

It grows in lowland mixed dipterocarp forests up to 400 metres elevation.

The species was first described as Shorea andulensis by Peter Shaw Ashton in 1962. In 2022 Ashton and Jacqueline Heckenhauer placed the species in genus Rubroshorea as R. andulensis.

== See also ==
- List of Shorea species
