= Shorea obscura =

Conservation status
- Vulnerable (IUCN 3.1)

Scientific classification
- Kingdom: Plantae
- Clade: Tracheophytes
- Clade: Angiosperms
- Clade: Eudicots
- Clade: Rosids
- Order: Malvales
- Family: Dipterocarpaceae
- Genus: Shorea
- Species: S. obscura

Binomial name
- Shorea obscura Meijer

Species of tree

Shorea obscura is a species of flowering plant in the family Dipterocarpaceae. It is a tree endemic to Borneo.

== See also ==
- List of Shorea species
