= Shorea exelliptica =

Conservation status
- Near Threatened (IUCN 3.1)

Scientific classification
- Kingdom: Plantae
- Clade: Tracheophytes
- Clade: Angiosperms
- Clade: Eudicots
- Clade: Rosids
- Order: Malvales
- Family: Dipterocarpaceae
- Genus: Shorea
- Species: S. exelliptica

Binomial name
- Shorea exelliptica Meijer

Synonyms
- S. ?elliptica auct. non

Species of tree

Shorea exelliptica is a species of plant in the family Dipterocarpaceae. This species has previously been confused with Shorea elliptica and the species name is derived to highlight this point (ex = excluded from).

S. exelliptica is found in Peninsular Malaysia and Borneo. It is an emergent tree, up to 60 metres (200 ft) tall, found in mixed dipterocarp forest on yellow clay and sandy clay soils on sedimentary rock. It is found in at least two protected areas (Lambir Hills and Gunung Mulu National Parks).

== See also ==
- List of Shorea species
