= Shorea lunduensis =

Conservation status
- Near Threatened (IUCN 3.1)

Scientific classification
- Kingdom: Plantae
- Clade: Tracheophytes
- Clade: Angiosperms
- Clade: Eudicots
- Clade: Rosids
- Order: Malvales
- Family: Dipterocarpaceae
- Genus: Shorea
- Species: S. lunduensis

Binomial name
- Shorea lunduensis P.S.Ashton

Species of tree native to Borneo

Shorea lunduensis is a species of plant in the family Dipterocarpaceae. It is a tree endemic to Borneo.

== See also ==
- List of Shorea species
