= Rubroshorea carapae =

Conservation status
- Near Threatened (IUCN 3.1)

Scientific classification
- Kingdom: Plantae
- Clade: Tracheophytes
- Clade: Angiosperms
- Clade: Eudicots
- Clade: Rosids
- Order: Malvales
- Family: Dipterocarpaceae
- Genus: Rubroshorea
- Species: R. carapae

Binomial name
- Rubroshorea carapae (P.S.Ashton) P.S.Ashton & J.Heck.

Synonyms
- Shorea carapae P.S.Ashton

Species of tree

Rubroshorea carapae is a species of tree in the family Dipterocarpaceae. It is endemic to Borneo, where it grows in Brunei, Kalimantan, and Sarawak. It is a canopy tree growing up to 35 meters tall. It grows in swampy forests and on volcanic rock and sandstone.

The species was first described as Shorea carapae by Peter Shaw Ashton in 1967. In 2022 Ashton and Jacqueline Heckenhauer placed the species in genus Rubroshorea as R. carapae.

== See also ==
- List of Shorea species
