= Shorea domatiosa =

Conservation status
- Endangered (IUCN 3.1)

Scientific classification
- Kingdom: Plantae
- Clade: Tracheophytes
- Clade: Angiosperms
- Clade: Eudicots
- Clade: Rosids
- Order: Malvales
- Family: Dipterocarpaceae
- Genus: Shorea
- Species: S. domatiosa

Binomial name
- Shorea domatiosa P.S.Ashton

Species of tree native to Borneo

Shorea domatiosa is a species of tree in the family Dipterocarpaceae. It is endemic to Borneo. It is an Endangered species threatened by habitat loss.

== See also ==
- List of Shorea species
