= Shorea inappendiculata =

Conservation status
- Vulnerable (IUCN 3.1)

Scientific classification
- Kingdom: Plantae
- Clade: Tracheophytes
- Clade: Angiosperms
- Clade: Eudicots
- Clade: Rosids
- Order: Malvales
- Family: Dipterocarpaceae
- Genus: Shorea
- Species: S. inappendiculata

Binomial name
- Shorea inappendiculata Burck (1887)

Species of tree native to Southeast Asia

Shorea inappendiculata is a species of plant in the family Dipterocarpaceae. It is a tree native to Peninsular Malaysia, Sumatra, and Borneo. It was first formally described by Dutch botanist William Burck in 1887. It is threatened by habitat loss.

== See also ==
- List of Shorea species
