= Shorea crassa =

Conservation status
- Least Concern (IUCN 3.1)

Scientific classification
- Kingdom: Plantae
- Clade: Tracheophytes
- Clade: Angiosperms
- Clade: Eudicots
- Clade: Rosids
- Order: Malvales
- Family: Dipterocarpaceae
- Genus: Shorea
- Species: S. crassa

Binomial name
- Shorea crassa P.S.Ashton

Species of tree native to Borneo

Shorea crassa is a species of plant in the family Dipterocarpaceae. It is endemic to Borneo. The species name is derived from Latin (crassus = thick) and refers to thick leaf blade.

== Description ==
It is an emergent tree, up to 45 metres (148 ft), found in mixed dipterocarp forest on deep yellow sandy soils. It is found in at least one protected area (Gunung Mulu National Park).

== See also ==
- List of Shorea species
