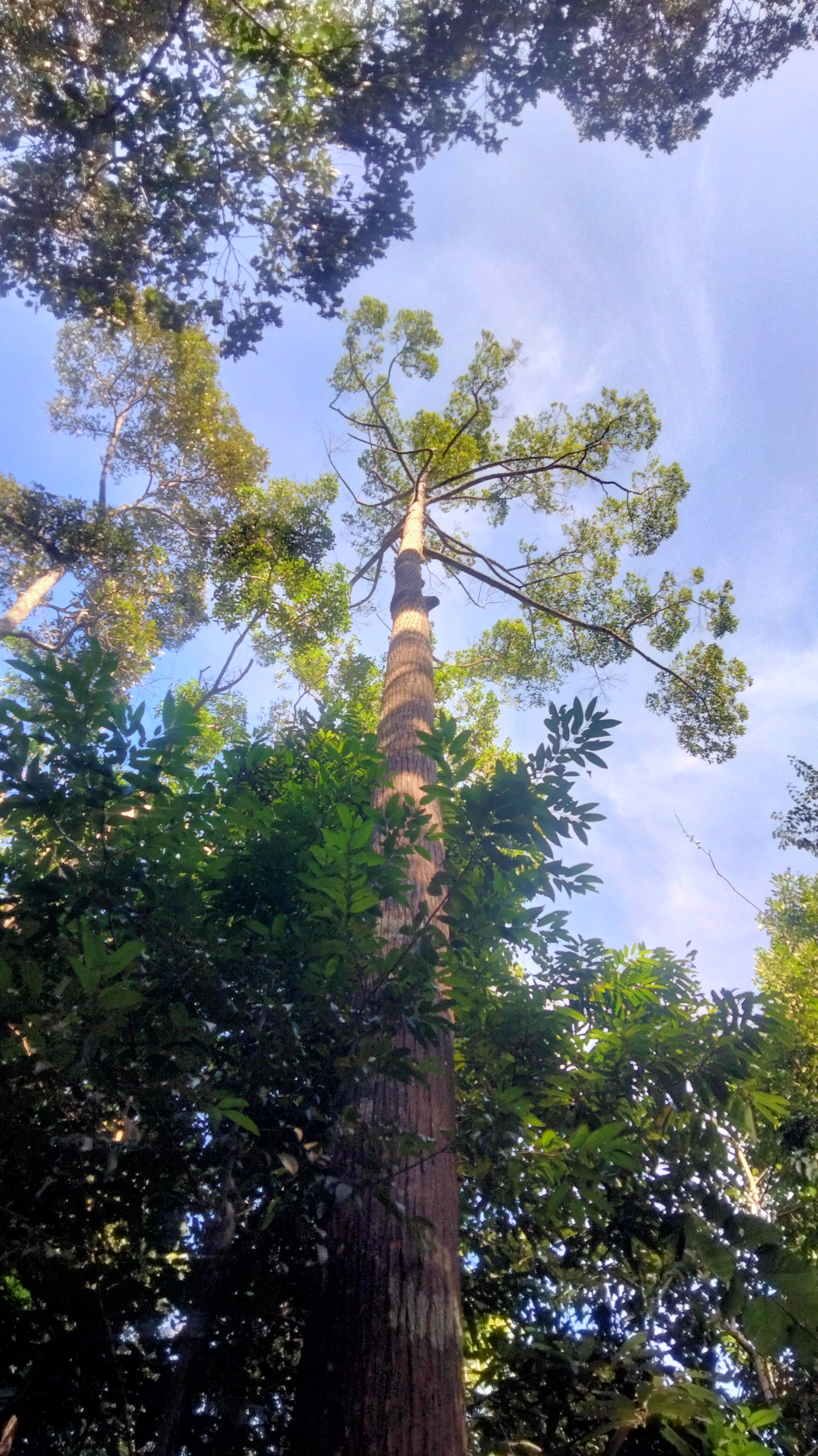
- At Menchali Forest Reserve, Malaysia

Conservation status
- Endangered (IUCN 3.1)

Scientific classification
- Kingdom: Plantae
- Clade: Tracheophytes
- Clade: Angiosperms
- Clade: Eudicots
- Clade: Rosids
- Order: Malvales
- Family: Dipterocarpaceae
- Genus: Shorea
- Species: S. materialis

Binomial name
- Shorea materialis Ridl.

= Shorea materialis =

Species of tree native to Southeast Asia

Shorea materialis is a species of plant in the family Dipterocarpaceae. It is a tree found in Sumatra, Peninsular Malaysia and Borneo.

== See also ==
- List of Shorea species
