= Shorea falcifera =

Conservation status
- Vulnerable (IUCN 3.1)

Scientific classification
- Kingdom: Plantae
- Clade: Tracheophytes
- Clade: Angiosperms
- Clade: Eudicots
- Clade: Rosids
- Order: Malvales
- Family: Dipterocarpaceae
- Genus: Shorea
- Species: S. falcifera

Binomial name
- Shorea falcifera Dyer ex Brandis

Species of tree

Shorea falcifera is an endangered species of plant in the family Dipterocarpaceae.

== Distribution ==
It is native to Sumatra, Peninsular Malaysia and Borneo.

== See also ==
- List of Shorea species
