= Shorea foxworthyi =

Conservation status
- Vulnerable (IUCN 3.1)

Scientific classification
- Kingdom: Plantae
- Clade: Tracheophytes
- Clade: Angiosperms
- Clade: Eudicots
- Clade: Rosids
- Order: Malvales
- Family: Dipterocarpaceae
- Genus: Shorea
- Species: S. foxworthyi

Binomial name
- Shorea foxworthyi Symington

Species of tree

Shorea foxworthyi is a species of plant in the family Dipterocarpaceae. It is a tree found in Thailand, Peninsular Malaysia, Sumatra, and Borneo.

== See also ==
- List of Shorea species
