= Shorea calcicola =

Conservation status
- Endangered (IUCN 3.1)

Scientific classification
- Kingdom: Plantae
- Clade: Tracheophytes
- Clade: Angiosperms
- Clade: Eudicots
- Clade: Rosids
- Order: Malvales
- Family: Dipterocarpaceae
- Genus: Shorea
- Species: S. calcicola

Binomial name
- Shorea calcicola P.S.Ashton

Species of tree

Shorea calcicola is a species of plant in the family Dipterocarpaceae. It is endemic to Borneo. The species name is derived from Latin (calx = limestone and colere = to grow) and refers to the preferred habitat of this species. It is a medium-sized tree, usually less than 50 metres (160 ft) tall, found in mixed dipterocarp forest on organic soils over limestone.

== See also ==
- List of Shorea species
