= Shorea geniculata =

Conservation status
- Vulnerable (IUCN 3.1)

Scientific classification
- Kingdom: Plantae
- Clade: Tracheophytes
- Clade: Angiosperms
- Clade: Eudicots
- Clade: Rosids
- Order: Malvales
- Family: Dipterocarpaceae
- Genus: Shorea
- Species: S. geniculata

Binomial name
- Shorea geniculata Symington ex P.S.Ashton

Species of tree

Shorea geniculata is a species of plant in the family Dipterocarpaceae. It is endemic to Borneo.

== See also ==
- List of Shorea species
