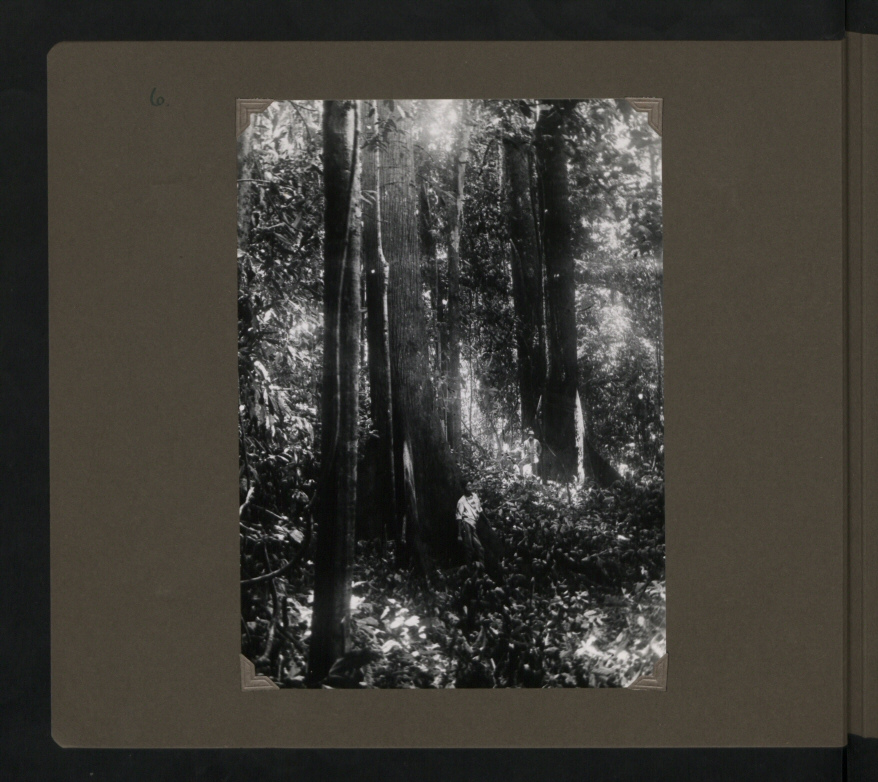

Conservation status
- Vulnerable (IUCN 3.1)

Scientific classification
- Kingdom: Plantae
- Clade: Tracheophytes
- Clade: Angiosperms
- Clade: Eudicots
- Clade: Rosids
- Order: Malvales
- Family: Dipterocarpaceae
- Genus: Richetia
- Species: R. acuminatissima

Binomial name
- Richetia acuminatissima (Symington) P.S.Ashton & J.Heck. (2022)

Synonyms
- Shorea acuminatissima Symington (1938)

= Richetia acuminatissima =

Species of tree

Richetia acuminatissima (called, along with some other species in the genus Richetia, yellow meranti) is a species of tree in the family Dipterocarpaceae. It is endemic to Borneo and threatened by habitat loss.
