= Rubroshorea monticola =

Conservation status
- Least Concern (IUCN 3.1)

Scientific classification
- Kingdom: Plantae
- Clade: Embryophytes
- Clade: Tracheophytes
- Clade: Angiosperms
- Clade: Eudicots
- Clade: Rosids
- Order: Malvales
- Family: Dipterocarpaceae
- Genus: Rubroshorea
- Species: R. monticola

Binomial name
- Rubroshorea monticola P.S.Ashton P.S.Ashton & J.Heck.

Synonyms
- Shorea monticola P.S.Ashton

Species of tree

Rubroshorea monticola is a tree in the family Dipterocarpaceae, native to Borneo.

The species was first described as Shorea monticola by Peter Shaw Ashton in 1962. The specific epithet monticola means 'mountain-dwelling', referring to the habitat. In 2022 Ashton and Jaqueline Heckenhauer placed the species in genus Rubroshorea as R. monticola.

== Description ==
Rubroshorea monticola grows up to 40 metres (130 ft) tall, with a trunk diameter of up to 1.2 m (4 ft). It has buttresses up to 1.5 m (5 ft) tall. The bark becomes cracked and flaky. The leathery leaves are elliptic and measure up to 13 cm (5 in) long. The inflorescences measure up to 12 cm (5 in) long.

== Distribution and habitat ==
Rubroshorea monticola is endemic to Borneo. Its habitat is upper dipterocarp forests, at elevations of 600–1,500 m (2,000–5,000 ft).
