= Shorea collina =

Conservation status
- Vulnerable (IUCN 3.1)

Scientific classification
- Kingdom: Plantae
- Clade: Tracheophytes
- Clade: Angiosperms
- Clade: Eudicots
- Clade: Rosids
- Order: Malvales
- Family: Dipterocarpaceae
- Genus: Shorea
- Species: S. collina

Binomial name
- Shorea collina Ridl.

Species of tree native to Malaysia

Shorea collina (called, along with some other species in the genus Shorea, red balau) is a species of tree in the family Dipterocarpaceae. It grows naturally in Peninsular Malaysia.
