= Richetia xanthophylla =

Conservation status
- Near Threatened (IUCN 3.1)

Scientific classification
- Kingdom: Plantae
- Clade: Tracheophytes
- Clade: Angiosperms
- Clade: Eudicots
- Clade: Rosids
- Order: Malvales
- Family: Dipterocarpaceae
- Genus: Richetia
- Species: R. xanthophylla

Binomial name
- Richetia xanthophylla (Symington) P.S.Ashton & J.Heck.

Synonyms
- Shorea xanthophylla Symington

Species of tree

Richetia xanthophylla (also called seraya kuning barun or lun barun) is a species of plant in the family Dipterocarpaceae. The name xanthophylla is derived from Greek, xanthos = yellow, phullon = leaf and refers to the yellowish colour of the dried leaf. The timber is sold under the trade name of yellow meranti.

Richetia xanthophylla grows as a rainforest canopy tree up to 40 metres (130 ft) tall. It is endemic to northern and northwestern Borneo.
