= Anthoshorea hulanidda =

Conservation status
- Endangered (IUCN 3.1)

Scientific classification
- Kingdom: Plantae
- Clade: Tracheophytes
- Clade: Angiosperms
- Clade: Eudicots
- Clade: Rosids
- Order: Malvales
- Family: Dipterocarpaceae
- Genus: Anthoshorea
- Species: A. hulanidda

Binomial name
- Anthoshorea hulanidda (Kosterm.) P.S.Ashton & J.Heck. (2022)

Synonyms
- Shorea hulanidda Kosterm. (1983)

Species of flowering plant

Anthoshorea hulanidda is a species of flowering plant in the family Dipterocarpaceae. It is a tree endemic to Sri Lanka. It is a large tree native to the remaining lowland rain forest of southwestern Sri Lanka. It is known from five locations, with an estimated extent of occurrence of 1,403 km^{2} and an estimated area of occupancy of 64 km^{2}. The species' population is declining, from timber harvesting and more recently the conversion of its forest habitat to tea plantations. It is assessed as endangered by the IUCN.
