= Richetia alutacea =

Conservation status
- Endangered (IUCN 3.1)

Scientific classification
- Kingdom: Plantae
- Clade: Tracheophytes
- Clade: Angiosperms
- Clade: Eudicots
- Clade: Rosids
- Order: Malvales
- Family: Dipterocarpaceae
- Genus: Richetia
- Species: R. alutacea

Binomial name
- Richetia alutacea (P.S.Ashton) P.S.Ashton & J.Heck. (2022)

Synonyms
- Shorea alutacea P.S.Ashton (1967)

Species of tree

Richetia alutacea is a species of tree in the family Dipterocarpaceae. It is endemic to Borneo, where it is confined to Sarawak.

Richetia alutacea is a medium-sized to large tree, growing up to 35 meters tall.

It grows in lowland forests, including mixed dipterocarp forest, riverine forest, and limestone forest, up to 300 meters elevation.
