= Rubroshorea praestans =

Conservation status
- Critically Endangered (IUCN 3.1)

Scientific classification
- Kingdom: Plantae
- Clade: Tracheophytes
- Clade: Angiosperms
- Clade: Eudicots
- Clade: Rosids
- Order: Malvales
- Family: Dipterocarpaceae
- Genus: Rubroshorea
- Species: R. praestans

Binomial name
- Rubroshorea praestans (P.S.Ashton) P.S.Ashton & J.Heck.

Synonyms
- Shorea praestans P.S.Ashton

Species of tree

Rubroshorea praestans (called, along with some other dipterocarp species, light red meranti) is a species of plant in the family Dipterocarpaceae. It is a tree endemic to Borneo, where it is confined to Sarawak.
