= Shorea lumutensis =

Conservation status
- Critically Endangered (IUCN 3.1)

Scientific classification
- Kingdom: Plantae
- Clade: Tracheophytes
- Clade: Angiosperms
- Clade: Eudicots
- Clade: Rosids
- Order: Malvales
- Family: Dipterocarpaceae
- Genus: Shorea
- Species: S. lumutensis

Binomial name
- Shorea lumutensis Symington

Species of tree native to Malaysia

Shorea lumutensis is a species of tree in the family Dipterocarpaceae. It is endemic to Peninsular Malaysia.
