= Richetia collaris =

Conservation status
- Vulnerable (IUCN 3.1)

Scientific classification
- Kingdom: Plantae
- Clade: Tracheophytes
- Clade: Angiosperms
- Clade: Eudicots
- Clade: Rosids
- Order: Malvales
- Family: Dipterocarpaceae
- Genus: Richetia
- Species: R. collaris

Binomial name
- Richetia collaris (Slooten) P.S.Ashton & J.Heck.

Synonyms
- Shorea collaris Slooten

Species of flowering plant

Richetia collaris is a tree in the family Dipterocarpaceae, native to Borneo. The specific epithet collaris means 'neck' and refers to the calyx of the fruit.

== Description ==
Richetia collaris grows up to 50 metres (160 ft) tall, with a trunk diameter of up to 1.5 m (5 ft). It has buttresses measuring up to 2 m (7 ft) tall. The cracked bark is yellow to brown. The papery leaves are oblong to lanceolate and measure up to 23 cm (9 in) long. The inflorescences measure up to 9 cm (4 in) long and bear up to eight flowers. The nuts are egg-shaped and measure up to 3 cm (1 in) long.

== Distribution and habitat ==
Richetia collaris is endemic Borneo, where it is present in Sarawak and Kalimantan. Its habitat is mixed dipterocarp forests up to 1,000 m (3,300 ft) elevation.

== Conservation ==
Richetia collaris has been assessed as vulnerable on the IUCN Red List. It is threatened by logging, including for its timber. It is also threatened by expansion of land for plantations, including for palm oil and other tree species. The species is not found in any protected areas.
