= Richetia laxa =

Conservation status
- Least Concern (IUCN 3.1)

Scientific classification
- Kingdom: Plantae
- Clade: Tracheophytes
- Clade: Angiosperms
- Clade: Eudicots
- Clade: Rosids
- Order: Malvales
- Family: Dipterocarpaceae
- Genus: Richetia
- Species: R. laxa

Binomial name
- Richetia laxa (Slooten) P.S.Ashton & J.Heck.

Synonyms
- Shorea laxa Slooten

Species of tree

Richetia laxa (called, along with some other species in the genus Richetia, yellow meranti) is a species of plant in the family Dipterocarpaceae. It is a tree endemic to Borneo. The species is common in numerous protected areas and no longer considered threatened.
