= Rubroshorea elliptica =

Conservation status
- Endangered (IUCN 3.1)

Scientific classification
- Kingdom: Plantae
- Clade: Tracheophytes
- Clade: Angiosperms
- Clade: Eudicots
- Clade: Rosids
- Order: Malvales
- Family: Dipterocarpaceae
- Genus: Rubroshorea
- Species: R. elliptica

Binomial name
- Rubroshorea elliptica (Burck) P.S.Ashton & J.Heck.

Synonyms
- Shorea elliptica Burck

Species of tree

Rubroshorea elliptica (called, along with some other species in the genus Rubroshorea, dark red meranti) is a species of tree in the family Dipterocarpaceae. It is endemic to western Borneo.
