= Richetia macrobalanos =

Conservation status
- Vulnerable (IUCN 3.1)

Scientific classification
- Kingdom: Plantae
- Clade: Tracheophytes
- Clade: Angiosperms
- Clade: Eudicots
- Clade: Rosids
- Order: Malvales
- Family: Dipterocarpaceae
- Genus: Richetia
- Species: R. macrobalanos

Binomial name
- Richetia macrobalanos (P.S.Ashton) P.S.Ashton & J.Heck.

Synonyms
- Shorea macrobalanos P.S.Ashton

Species of tree

Richetia macrobalanos (called, along with some other species in the genus Richetia, yellow meranti) is a species of flowering plant in the family Dipterocarpaceae. It is a tree endemic to Borneo. It is a tall tree, up to 45 metres tall, which grows in lowland rain forest on clay-rich soils on hill ridges.
