= Shorea leptoderma =

Conservation status
- Critically Endangered (IUCN 2.3)

Scientific classification
- Kingdom: Plantae
- Clade: Tracheophytes
- Clade: Angiosperms
- Clade: Eudicots
- Clade: Rosids
- Order: Malvales
- Family: Dipterocarpaceae
- Genus: Shorea
- Species: S. leptoderma

Binomial name
- Shorea leptoderma Meijer (1963)

Species of tree

Shorea leptoderma is a species of plant in the family Dipterocarpaceae. It is a tree endemic to Borneo where it is confined to Sabah. It grows in lowland rain forest.
