= Richetia induplicata =

Conservation status
- Critically Endangered (IUCN 3.1)

Scientific classification
- Kingdom: Plantae
- Clade: Tracheophytes
- Clade: Angiosperms
- Clade: Eudicots
- Clade: Rosids
- Order: Malvales
- Family: Dipterocarpaceae
- Genus: Richetia
- Species: R. induplicata

Binomial name
- Richetia induplicata (Slooten) P.S.Ashton & J.Heck.

Synonyms
- Shorea induplicata Slooten

Species of tree

Richetia induplicata is a species of flowering plant in the family Dipterocarpaceae. It is a tree endemic to Borneo.
