= Richetia longisperma =

Conservation status
- Endangered (IUCN 3.1)

Scientific classification
- Kingdom: Plantae
- Clade: Tracheophytes
- Clade: Angiosperms
- Clade: Eudicots
- Clade: Rosids
- Order: Malvales
- Family: Dipterocarpaceae
- Genus: Richetia
- Species: R. longisperma

Binomial name
- Richetia longisperma (Roxb.) P.S.Ashton & J.Heck.

Synonyms
- Parashorea longisperma (Roxb.) Kurz; Shorea longisperma Roxb.; Shorea resina-nigra Foxw.

Species of tree

Richetia longisperma (called, along with some other species in the genus Richetia, yellow meranti) is a species of tree in the family Dipterocarpaceae. It is native to Peninsular Thailand, Peninsular Malaysia and Borneo.
