= Shorea ochrophloia =

Conservation status
- Vulnerable (IUCN 3.1)

Scientific classification
- Kingdom: Plantae
- Clade: Tracheophytes
- Clade: Angiosperms
- Clade: Eudicots
- Clade: Rosids
- Order: Malvales
- Family: Dipterocarpaceae
- Genus: Shorea
- Species: S. ochrophloia

Binomial name
- Shorea ochrophloia Symington

Species of tree

Shorea ochrophloia (called, along with some other species in the genus Shorea, red balau) is a species of plant in the family Dipterocarpaceae. It is native Sumatra and Peninsular Malaysia.
