= Shorea ciliata =

Conservation status
- Near Threatened (IUCN 3.1)

Scientific classification
- Kingdom: Plantae
- Clade: Tracheophytes
- Clade: Angiosperms
- Clade: Eudicots
- Clade: Rosids
- Order: Malvales
- Family: Dipterocarpaceae
- Genus: Shorea
- Species: S. ciliata

Binomial name
- Shorea ciliata King

Species of tree native to Malaysia

Shorea ciliata is a species of flowering plant in the family Dipterocarpaceae. It is a tree found in Peninsular Malaysia.
