= Rubroshorea pallidifolia =

Conservation status
- Endangered (IUCN 3.1)

Scientific classification
- Kingdom: Plantae
- Clade: Tracheophytes
- Clade: Angiosperms
- Clade: Eudicots
- Clade: Rosids
- Order: Malvales
- Family: Dipterocarpaceae
- Genus: Rubroshorea
- Species: R. pallidifolia

Binomial name
- Rubroshorea pallidifolia (P.S.Ashton) P.S.Ashton & J.Heck.

Synonyms
- Shorea pallidifolia P.S.Ashton

Species of tree

Rubroshorea pallidifolia (commonly known, along with some other species in genus Rubroshorea, as red meranti) is a species of plant in the family Dipterocarpaceae. It is a tree endemic to western and central Sarawak on the island of Borneo. It is native to lowland heath or kerangas forest up to 400 metres elevation.

The species was first described as Shorea pallidifolia by Peter Shaw Ashton in 1967. In 2022 Ashton and Jacqueline Heckenhauer placed the species in genus Rubroshorea as R. pallidifolia.
