= Rubroshorea myrionerva =

Conservation status
- Near Threatened (IUCN 3.1)

Scientific classification
- Kingdom: Plantae
- Clade: Tracheophytes
- Clade: Angiosperms
- Clade: Eudicots
- Clade: Rosids
- Order: Malvales
- Family: Dipterocarpaceae
- Genus: Rubroshorea
- Species: R. myrionerva

Binomial name
- Rubroshorea myrionerva (Symington ex P.S.Ashton) P.S.Ashton & J.Heck.

Synonyms
- Shorea myrionerva Symington ex P.S.Ashton

Species of tree

Rubroshorea myrionerva (called, along with some other dipterocarp species, light red meranti) is a species of flowering plant in the family Dipterocarpaceae. It is a tree endemic to Borneo which grows up to 45 metres tall. It is native to lowland rain forests below 400 metres elevation, where it grows on moist hillsides and along rivers.
