= Rubroshorea flemmichii =

Conservation status
- Vulnerable (IUCN 3.1)

Scientific classification
- Kingdom: Plantae
- Clade: Tracheophytes
- Clade: Angiosperms
- Clade: Eudicots
- Clade: Rosids
- Order: Malvales
- Family: Dipterocarpaceae
- Genus: Rubroshorea
- Species: R. flemmichii

Binomial name
- Rubroshorea flemmichii (Symington) P.S.Ashton & J.Heck.

Synonyms
- Shorea flemmichii Symington

Species of tree

Rubroshorea flemmichii is a species of plant in the family Dipterocarpaceae. It is endemic to Brunei and Sarawak on the island of Borneo. It is a canopy tree in lowland mixed dipterocarp forest, where it can grow up to 60 metres tall. R. flemmichii is threatened by timber logging and habitat loss from agricultural expansion including oil palm and non-native tree plantations.
