= Anthoshorea retinodes =

Conservation status
- Vulnerable (IUCN 3.1)

Scientific classification
- Kingdom: Plantae
- Clade: Tracheophytes
- Clade: Angiosperms
- Clade: Eudicots
- Clade: Rosids
- Order: Malvales
- Family: Dipterocarpaceae
- Genus: Anthoshorea
- Species: A. retinodes

Binomial name
- Anthoshorea retinodes (Slooten) P.S.Ashton & J.Heck. (2022)

Synonyms
- Shorea retinodes Slooten (1949)

Species of flowering plant

Anthoshorea retinodes is a species of flowering plant in the family Dipterocarpaceae. It is a tree endemic to Sumatra. It is a large tree, growing up to 55 meters tall. It is native to lowland rain forest, where it is locally common on slopes from 30 to 1,000 meters elevation.

The species' population and extent of occurrence (EOO) is declining from conversion of its forest habitat and cutting the trees for timber. The species' population is estimated to have been reduced by 30% over the last three generations, and it is estimated that ongoing habitat conversion will reduce the species' extent of occurrence by 32% and its area of occupancy (AOO) by 14%. It is assessed as vulnerable by the IUCN.
