= Richetia cuspidata =

Conservation status
- Vulnerable (IUCN 3.1)

Scientific classification
- Kingdom: Plantae
- Clade: Tracheophytes
- Clade: Angiosperms
- Clade: Eudicots
- Clade: Rosids
- Order: Malvales
- Family: Dipterocarpaceae
- Genus: Richetia
- Species: R. cuspidata

Binomial name
- Richetia cuspidata (P.S.Ashton) P.S.Ashton & J.Heck.

Synonyms
- Shorea cuspidata P.S.Ashton

Species of hardwood tree

Richetia cuspidata is a species of plant in the family Dipterocarpaceae. It is a tree endemic to Borneo. It is native to Sarawak and western Kalimantan, where it grows in lowland mixed dipterocarp forest up to 600 meters elevation. It is listed on the IUCN Red List as Vulnerable, and populations are known to occur in the Bako and Lambir Hills.
