= Richetia chaiana =

Conservation status
- Vulnerable (IUCN 3.1)

Scientific classification
- Kingdom: Plantae
- Clade: Tracheophytes
- Clade: Angiosperms
- Clade: Eudicots
- Clade: Rosids
- Order: Malvales
- Family: Dipterocarpaceae
- Genus: Richetia
- Species: R. chaiana

Binomial name
- Richetia chaiana (P.S.Ashton) P.S.Ashton & J.Heck. (2022)

Synonyms
- Shorea chaiana P.S.Ashton (1978)

Species of tree

Richetia chaiana is a species of tree in the family Dipterocarpaceae. It is a tree endemic to Sarawak and Brunei on Borneo. It is a large tree, growing up to 45 metres tall, native to lowland rain forest up to 1000 metres elevation.
