= Richetia mujongensis =

Conservation status
- Vulnerable (IUCN 3.1)

Scientific classification
- Kingdom: Plantae
- Clade: Tracheophytes
- Clade: Angiosperms
- Clade: Eudicots
- Clade: Rosids
- Order: Malvales
- Family: Dipterocarpaceae
- Genus: Richetia
- Species: R. mujongensis

Binomial name
- Richetia mujongensis (P.S.Ashton) P.S.Ashton & J.Heck.

Synonyms
- Shorea mujongensis P.S.Ashton

Species of tree

Richetia mujongensis is a species of tree in the family Dipterocarpaceae. It is endemic to Borneo.
