= Richetia patoiensis =

Conservation status
- Near Threatened (IUCN 3.1)

Scientific classification
- Kingdom: Plantae
- Clade: Tracheophytes
- Clade: Angiosperms
- Clade: Eudicots
- Clade: Rosids
- Order: Malvales
- Family: Dipterocarpaceae
- Genus: Richetia
- Species: R. patoiensis

Binomial name
- Richetia patoiensis (P.S.Ashton) P.S.Ashton & J.Heck.

Synonyms
- Shorea patoiensis P.S.Ashton

Species of flowering plant

Richetia patoiensis is a tree in the family Dipterocarpaceae. It is native to Borneo.

== Description ==
Richetia patoiensis grows up to 45 metres (150 ft) tall, with a trunk diameter of up to 1 m (3 ft). It has buttresses up to 2 m (7 ft) tall. The brown bark is flaky. The papery leaves are ovate and measure up to 8 cm (3 in) long. The inflorescences bear yellow flowers.

== Taxonomy ==
The species was first described as Shorea patoiensis by British botanist Peter Shaw Ashton in Gardens' Bulletin Singapore in 1962. In 2022, Ashton and Jacqueline Heckenhauer moved the species to Richetia. The type specimen was collected in Bukit Patoi, a hill in Brunei. The specific epithet patoiensis refers to Bukit Patoi.

== Distribution and habitat ==
Richetia patoiensis is endemic to Borneo. Its habitat is lowland rain forests, including on hillsides, to elevations of 600 m (2,000 ft).

== Conservation ==
Richetia patoiensis has been assessed as near threatened on the IUCN Red List. It is threatened by conversion of land for intensive agriculture. It is also threatened by logging for its timber and by the construction of logging roads. Mining occurs in the species' habitat in Kalimantan. Shorea patoiensis does occur in a number of protected areas.
