= Shorea brunnescens =

Conservation status
- Endangered (IUCN 3.1)

Scientific classification
- Kingdom: Plantae
- Clade: Tracheophytes
- Clade: Angiosperms
- Clade: Eudicots
- Clade: Rosids
- Order: Malvales
- Family: Dipterocarpaceae
- Genus: Shorea
- Species: S. brunnescens

Binomial name
- Shorea brunnescens P.S.Ashton

Species of tree

Shorea brunnescens is an endangered species of plant in the family Dipterocarpaceae. It is endemic to Borneo.
