= Richetia bakoensis =

Conservation status
- Vulnerable (IUCN 3.1)

Scientific classification
- Kingdom: Plantae
- Clade: Tracheophytes
- Clade: Angiosperms
- Clade: Eudicots
- Clade: Rosids
- Order: Malvales
- Family: Dipterocarpaceae
- Genus: Richetia
- Species: R. bakoensis

Binomial name
- Richetia bakoensis (P.S.Ashton) P.S.Ashton & J.Heck. (2022)

Synonyms
- Shorea bakoensis P.S.Ashton (1967)

Species of tree

Richetia bakoensis is a species of tree in the family Dipterocarpaceae. It is endemic to Borneo, where it is confined to western Sarawak.
