= Richetia hopeifolia =

Conservation status
- Least Concern (IUCN 3.1)

Scientific classification
- Kingdom: Plantae
- Clade: Tracheophytes
- Clade: Angiosperms
- Clade: Eudicots
- Clade: Rosids
- Order: Malvales
- Family: Dipterocarpaceae
- Genus: Richetia
- Species: R. hopeifolia

Binomial name
- Richetia hopeifolia (F.Heim) P.S.Ashton & J.Heck.

Synonyms
- Cotylelobium hopeifolium F.Heim; Hopea albescens Ridl.; Hopea heimiana Brandis; Shorea hopeifolia (F.Heim) Symington; Shorea kalunti Merr.

Species of tree

Richetia hopeifolia (called, along with some other species in the genus Richetia, yellow meranti) is a species of flowering plant in the family Dipterocarpaceae. It is a tree native to Sumatra, Peninsular Malaysia, Borneo, and Mindanao in the Philippines.
