= Rubroshorea rubella =

Conservation status
- Vulnerable (IUCN 3.1)

Scientific classification
- Kingdom: Plantae
- Clade: Tracheophytes
- Clade: Angiosperms
- Clade: Eudicots
- Clade: Rosids
- Order: Malvales
- Family: Dipterocarpaceae
- Genus: Rubroshorea
- Species: R. rubella

Binomial name
- Rubroshorea rubella (P.S.Ashton) P.S.Ashton & J.Heck.

Synonyms
- Shorea rubella P.S.Ashton

Species of tree

Rubroshorea rubella (called, along with some other dipterocarp species, light red meranti) is a species of tree in the family Dipterocarpaceae. It is endemic to Borneo.

The species was first described as Shorea rubella by Peter Shaw Ashton in 1962. In 2022 Ashton and Jacqueline Heckenhauer placed the species in genus Rubroshorea as R. rubella.
