= Rubroshorea quadrinervis =

Conservation status
- Vulnerable (IUCN 3.1)

Scientific classification
- Kingdom: Plantae
- Clade: Embryophytes
- Clade: Tracheophytes
- Clade: Angiosperms
- Clade: Eudicots
- Clade: Rosids
- Order: Malvales
- Family: Dipterocarpaceae
- Genus: Rubroshorea
- Species: R. quadrinervis

Binomial name
- Rubroshorea quadrinervis (Slooten) P.S.Ashton & J.Heck.

Synonyms
- Shorea quadrinervis Slooten

Species of tree

Rubroshorea quadrinervis, synonym Shorea quadrinervis, (called, along with some other species in the genera Rubroshorea and Shorea, light red meranti) is a species of plant in the family Dipterocarpaceae. It is a tree endemic to Borneo. It is threatened by habitat loss.
