= Rubroshorea slootenii =

Conservation status
- Vulnerable (IUCN 3.1)

Scientific classification
- Kingdom: Plantae
- Clade: Tracheophytes
- Clade: Angiosperms
- Clade: Eudicots
- Clade: Rosids
- Order: Malvales
- Family: Dipterocarpaceae
- Genus: Rubroshorea
- Species: R. slootenii

Binomial name
- Rubroshorea slootenii (P.S.Ashton) P.S.Ashton & J.Heck.

Synonyms
- Shorea slootenii P.S.Ashton

Species of flowering plant

Rubroshorea slootenii is a species of plant in the family Dipterocarpaceae. It is a tree endemic to Borneo. It grows up to 40 metres tall in lowland mixed dipterocarp forests up to 400 metres elevation.

The species was first described as Shorea slootenii by Peter Shaw Ashton in 1962. In 2022 Ashton and Jacqueline Heckenhauer placed the species in genus Rubroshorea as R. slootenii.
