= Richetia blumutensis =

Conservation status
- Vulnerable (IUCN 3.1)

Scientific classification
- Kingdom: Plantae
- Clade: Tracheophytes
- Clade: Angiosperms
- Clade: Eudicots
- Clade: Rosids
- Order: Malvales
- Family: Dipterocarpaceae
- Genus: Richetia
- Species: R. blumutensis

Binomial name
- Richetia blumutensis (Foxw.) P.S.Ashton & J.Heck. (2022)

Synonyms
- Shorea blumutensis Foxw. (1932)

Species of tree

Richetia blumutensis (called, along with some other species in the genus Richetia, yellow meranti) is a species of plant in the family Dipterocarpaceae. It a large, slow-growing tree native to Sumatra and Peninsular Malaysia, where it grows in lowland rain forest below 500 meters elevation.
