= Shorea malibato =

Conservation status
- Vulnerable (IUCN 3.1)

Scientific classification
- Kingdom: Plantae
- Clade: Tracheophytes
- Clade: Angiosperms
- Clade: Eudicots
- Clade: Rosids
- Order: Malvales
- Family: Dipterocarpaceae
- Genus: Shorea
- Species: S. malibato

Binomial name
- Shorea malibato Foxw.

Species of tree native to the Philippines

Shorea malibato is a species of plant in the family Dipterocarpaceae. It is endemic to the Philippines.
