= Rubroshorea hemsleyana =

Conservation status
- Vulnerable (IUCN 3.1)

Scientific classification
- Kingdom: Plantae
- Clade: Tracheophytes
- Clade: Angiosperms
- Clade: Eudicots
- Clade: Rosids
- Order: Malvales
- Family: Dipterocarpaceae
- Genus: Rubroshorea
- Species: R. hemsleyana

Binomial name
- Rubroshorea hemsleyana (King) P.S.Ashton & J.Heck.

Synonyms
- Balanocarpus hemsleyanus King (1893); Pachychlamys hemsleyana (King) Ridl.; Shorea grandiflora Brandis; Shorea hemsleyana (King) King ex Foxw.; Shorea hemsleyana subsp. grandiflora (Brandis) P.S.Ashton; Shorea hemsleyana subsp. hemsleyana

Species of flowering plant

Shorea hemsleyana is a species of flowering plant in the family Dipterocarpaceae. It is a tree native to Borneo, Sumatra, Peninsular Malaysia, and Peninsular Thailand. It grows in lowland mixed dipterocarp rain forests up to 600 metres elevation on clay and peat soils.

The species was first described as Balanocarpus hemsleyanus by George King in 1893. In 2022 Peter Shaw Ashton and Jacqueline Heckenhauer placed the species in genus Rubroshorea as R. hemsleyanus.
