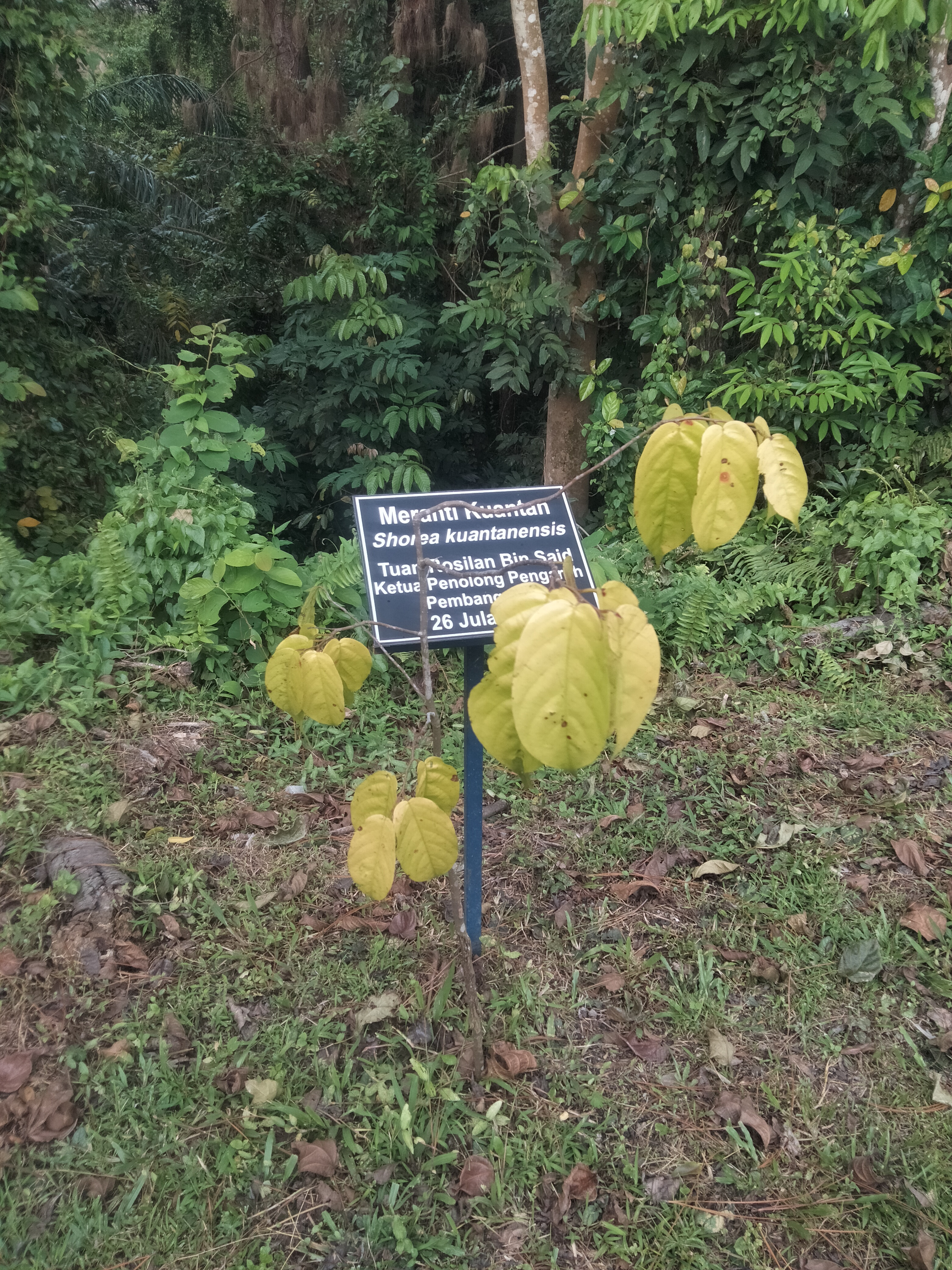
- A sapling of Richetia kuantanensis

Conservation status
- Critically Endangered (IUCN 3.1)

Scientific classification
- Kingdom: Plantae
- Clade: Tracheophytes
- Clade: Angiosperms
- Clade: Eudicots
- Clade: Rosids
- Order: Malvales
- Family: Dipterocarpaceae
- Genus: Richetia
- Species: R. kuantanensis

Binomial name
- Richetia kuantanensis (P.S.Ashton) P.S.Ashton & J.Heck.

Synonyms
- Shorea kuantanensis P.S.Ashton

= Richetia kuantanensis =

Species of tree

Richetia kuantanensis is a species of plant in the family Dipterocarpaceae. It is a tree endemic to Peninsular Malaysia. It is threatened by habitat loss.
