= Rubroshorea rubra =

Conservation status
- Near Threatened (IUCN 3.1)

Scientific classification
- Kingdom: Plantae
- Clade: Embryophytes
- Clade: Tracheophytes
- Clade: Angiosperms
- Clade: Eudicots
- Clade: Rosids
- Order: Malvales
- Family: Dipterocarpaceae
- Genus: Rubroshorea
- Species: R. rubra

Binomial name
- Rubroshorea rubra (G.H.S.Wood ex P.S.Ashton) P.S.Ashton & J.Heck.

Synonyms
- Shorea rubra G.H.S.Wood ex P.S.Ashton

Species of tree

Rubroshorea rubra is a tree in the family Dipterocarpaceae, native to Borneo. The specific epithet rubra means 'red' and refers to the underside of the leaf.

== Description ==
Rubroshorea rubra grows up to 50 metres (160 ft) tall, with a trunk diameter of up to 1.3 m (4 ft). It has buttresses up to 2.5 m (8 ft) tall. The dark brown to black bark is fissured and becomes flaky. The leathery leaves are ovate and measure up to 13 cm (5 in) long. The inflorescences bear yellow flowers.

== Distribution and habitat ==
Rubroshorea rubra is endemic to Borneo. Its habitat is mixed dipterocarp forests to elevations of 800 m (2,600 ft).

== Conservation ==
Rubroshorea rubra has been assessed as near threatened on the IUCN Red List. It is threatened by land conversion for agriculture. It is also threatened by logging for its timber. R. rubra does occur in a number of protected areas.
