= Rubroshorea beccariana =

Conservation status
- Least Concern (IUCN 3.1)

Scientific classification
- Kingdom: Plantae
- Clade: Embryophytes
- Clade: Tracheophytes
- Clade: Angiosperms
- Clade: Eudicots
- Clade: Rosids
- Order: Malvales
- Family: Dipterocarpaceae
- Genus: Rubroshorea
- Species: R. beccariana

Binomial name
- Rubroshorea beccariana (Burck) P.S.Ashton & J.Heck.

Synonyms
- Shorea beccariana Burck; Shorea franchetiana F.Heim

Species of tree

Rubroshorea beccariana is a tree in the family Dipterocarpaceae which is endemic to Borneo.

The species was first described as Shorea beccariana by William Burck in 1887. It is named for the Italian botanist Odoardo Beccari. In 2022 Peter Shaw Ashton and Jacqueline Heckenhauer placed it in the genus Rubroshorea as R. beccariana.

== Description ==
Rubroshorea beccariana grows up to 60 metres (200 ft) tall, with a trunk diameter of up to 1.1 m (4 ft). It has buttresses up to 1.5 m (5 ft) tall. The bark is generally smooth. The leathery leaves are ovate to elliptic and measure up to 20 cm (8 in) long. The inflorescences measure up to 20 cm (8 in) long and bear up to eight pink flowers. The nuts are egg-shaped and measure up to 4 cm (1.6 in) long.

== Distribution and habitat ==
Rubroshorea beccariana is endemic to Borneo. Its habitat is mixed dipterocarp forests, to elevations of 700 m (2,300 ft).
