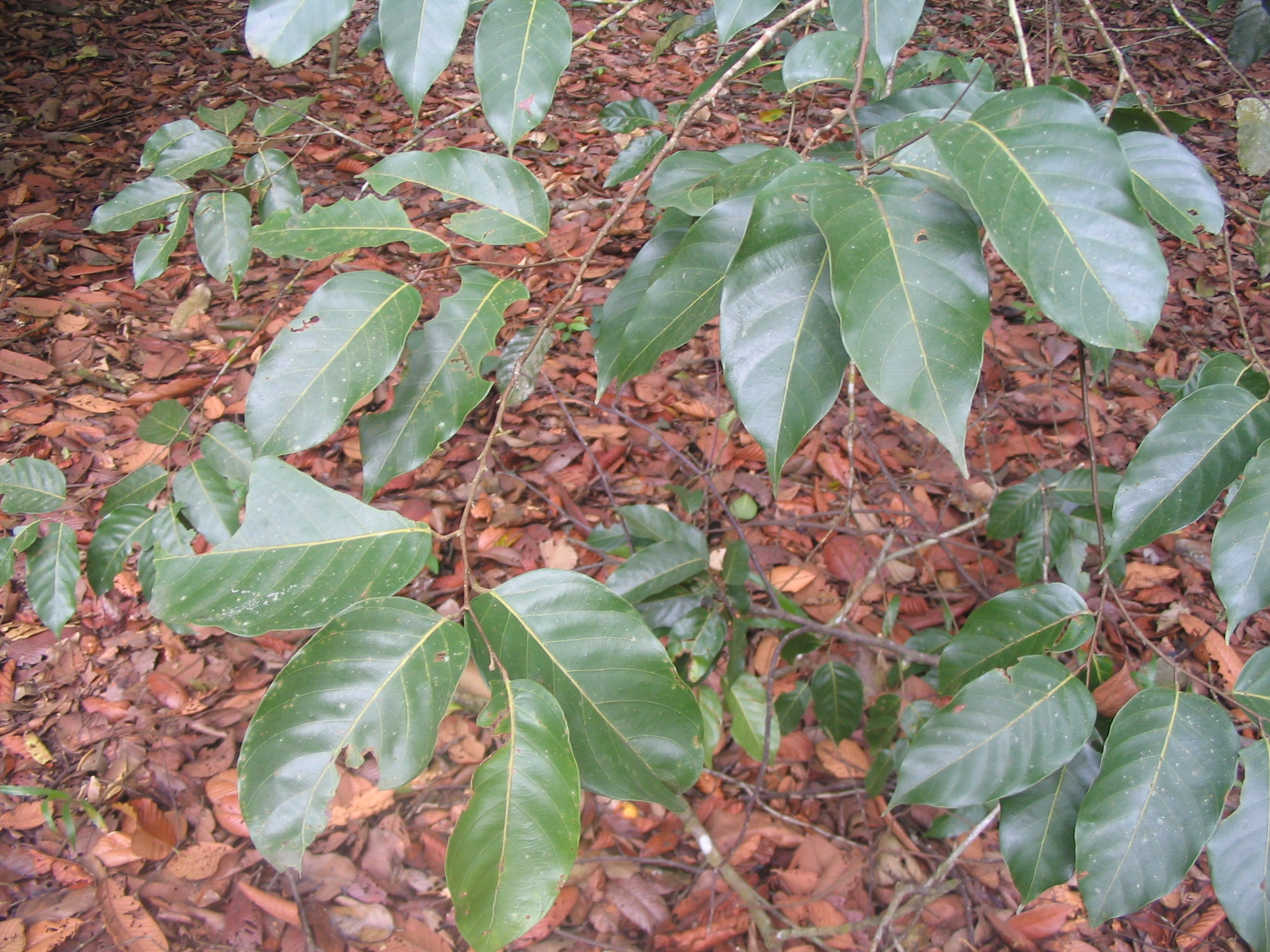

Conservation status
- Endangered (IUCN 3.1)

Scientific classification
- Kingdom: Plantae
- Clade: Tracheophytes
- Clade: Angiosperms
- Clade: Eudicots
- Clade: Rosids
- Order: Malvales
- Family: Dipterocarpaceae
- Genus: Shorea
- Species: S. glauca

Binomial name
- Shorea glauca King

= Shorea glauca =

Species of tree

Shorea glauca is a species of tree in the family Dipterocarpaceae. It is native to Sumatra, Peninsular Malaysia, and Thailand.
