= Richetia angustifolia =

Conservation status
- Near Threatened (IUCN 3.1)

Scientific classification
- Kingdom: Plantae
- Clade: Embryophytes
- Clade: Tracheophytes
- Clade: Angiosperms
- Clade: Eudicots
- Clade: Rosids
- Order: Malvales
- Family: Dipterocarpaceae
- Genus: Richetia
- Species: R. angustifolia

Binomial name
- Richetia angustifolia (P.S.Ashton) P.S.Ashton & J.Heck. (2022)

Synonyms
- Shorea angustifolia P.S.Ashton (1962)

Species of tree

Richetia angustifolia is a tree in the family Dipterocarpaceae, native to Borneo.

The species was first described as Shorea angustifolia by Peter Shaw Ashton in 1962. The specific epithet angustifolia means 'narrow-leaved'. In 2022 Ashton and Jacqueline Heckenhauer placed the species in genus Richetia as R. angustifolia.

== Description ==
Richetia angustifolia grows up to 40 metres (130 ft) tall, with a trunk diameter of up to 90 cm (3 ft). It has buttresses. The flaky bark is greyish tan in colour. The leathery leaves are ovate to lanceolate and measure up to 14 cm (6 in) long. The inflorescences measure up to 10 cm (4 in) long and bear up to eight cream-coloured flowers. The nuts are egg-shaped and measure up to 0.8 cm (0.3 in) long.

== Distribution and habitat ==
Richetia angustifolia is endemic to Borneo. Its habitat is mixed dipterocarp forests at elevations of 500–1,200 m (1,600–3,900 ft).

== Conservation ==
Richetia angustifolia has been assessed as near threatened on the IUCN Red List. It is threatened by the conversion of land for plantations, including those for palm oil. It is also threatened by logging, sometimes for its timber. The species occurs in several protected areas, including national parks.
