= Richetia multiflora =

Conservation status
- Least Concern (IUCN 3.1)

Scientific classification
- Kingdom: Plantae
- Clade: Tracheophytes
- Clade: Angiosperms
- Clade: Eudicots
- Clade: Rosids
- Order: Malvales
- Family: Dipterocarpaceae
- Genus: Richetia
- Species: R. multiflora

Binomial name
- Richetia multiflora (Burck) P.S.Ashton & J.Heck.

Synonyms
- Balanocarpus acuminatus F.Heim; Balanocarpus latifolia Brandis; Balanocarpus multiflorus (Burck) Symington; Balanocarpus penangianus (F.Heim) King; Balanocarpus sibogae Boerl.; Doona multiflora Burck; Hopea multiflora Brandis; Richetia acuminata Baill.; Richetia latifolia (Brandis) F.Heim; Richetia penangiana F.Heim; Shorea multiflora (Burck) Symington

Species of tree

Richetia multiflora (called, along with some other species in the genus Richetia, yellow meranti) is a species of tree in the family Dipterocarpaceae. It is native to Sumatra, Peninsular Malaysia and Borneo.
