= Shorea altopoensis =

Scientific classification
- Kingdom: Plantae
- Clade: Tracheophytes
- Clade: Angiosperms
- Clade: Eudicots
- Clade: Rosids
- Order: Malvales
- Family: Dipterocarpaceae
- Genus: Shorea
- Species: S. altopoensis

Binomial name
- Shorea altopoensis Pierre (1890)

Species of flowering plant

Shorea altopoensis is a species of flowering plant in the family Dipterocarpaceae. It is a tree endemic to Cambodia.
