= Rubroshorea foraminifera =

Conservation status
- Critically Endangered (IUCN 3.1)

Scientific classification
- Kingdom: Plantae
- Clade: Tracheophytes
- Clade: Angiosperms
- Clade: Eudicots
- Clade: Rosids
- Order: Malvales
- Family: Dipterocarpaceae
- Genus: Rubroshorea
- Species: R. foraminifera

Binomial name
- Rubroshorea foraminifera (P.S.Ashton) P.S.Ashton & J.Heck.

Synonyms
- Shorea foraminifera P.S.Ashton

Species of tree

Rubroshorea foraminifera is a species of plant in the family Dipterocarpaceae. It is a tree endemic to Borneo which grow up to 50 metres tall. It grows in periodically flooded lowland forest on sandy alluvium or shallow peat.

The species has a declining range and population. The species' declined by 59% and area of occupancy 58%

The species was first described as Shorea foraminifera by Peter Shaw Ashton in 1967. In 2022 Ashton and Jacqueline Heckenhauer placed the species in genus Rubroshorea as R. foraminifera.
