= Rubroshorea dispar =

Conservation status
- Critically Endangered (IUCN 3.1)

Scientific classification
- Kingdom: Plantae
- Clade: Tracheophytes
- Clade: Angiosperms
- Clade: Eudicots
- Clade: Rosids
- Order: Malvales
- Family: Dipterocarpaceae
- Genus: Rubroshorea
- Species: R. dispar

Binomial name
- Rubroshorea dispar (P.S.Ashton) P.S.Ashton & J.Heck.

Synonyms
- Shorea dispar P.S.Ashton

Species of tree

Rubroshorea dispar is a species of tree in the family Dipterocarpaceae. It is endemic to Borneo, where it is confined to central Sarawak. It is a large emergent tree, up to 45 metres tall, which grows on shale ridges in lowland mixed dipterocarp rain forests from 300 to 600 metres elevation.
