= Rubroshorea revoluta =

Conservation status
- Critically Endangered (IUCN 3.1)

Scientific classification
- Kingdom: Plantae
- Clade: Tracheophytes
- Clade: Angiosperms
- Clade: Eudicots
- Clade: Rosids
- Order: Malvales
- Family: Dipterocarpaceae
- Genus: Rubroshorea
- Species: R. revoluta

Binomial name
- Rubroshorea revoluta (P.S.Ashton) P.S.Ashton & J.Heck.

Synonyms
- Shorea revoluta P.S.Ashton

Species of tree

Rubroshorea revoluta (called, along with some other dipterocarp species, light red meranti) is a species of plant in the family Dipterocarpaceae. It is a tree endemic to Borneo.

The species was first described as Shorea revoluta by Peter Shaw Ashton in 1962. In 2022 Ashton and Jacqueline Heckenhauer placed the species in genus Rubroshorea as R. revoluta.

== Description ==
Ruboshorea revoluta is a tree which grows up to 45 meters in height.

== Range and habitat ==
Rubroshorea revoluta is native to southwestern Sabah and northeastern Sarawak, as well as Brunei and Kalimantan.

It lives in heath forests, also known as kerangas forests, which grow on nutrient-poor sandy soils. It is an emergent tree, which grows higher than the forest canopy. Its range extends from the lowlands up to 1,200 meters elevation.

== Conservation ==
Rubroshorea revoluta has a small and declining population, and is subject to habitat loss across most of its range from the extensive deforestation of lowland Borneo. Its current population and range are not well understood. The Brunei subpopulation is mostly in forest reserves, while the Malaysian subpopulations are mostly unprotected. Its conservation status is assessed as Critically Endangered.
