= Rubroshorea pilosa =

Conservation status
- Near Threatened (IUCN 3.1)

Scientific classification
- Kingdom: Plantae
- Clade: Tracheophytes
- Clade: Angiosperms
- Clade: Eudicots
- Clade: Rosids
- Order: Malvales
- Family: Dipterocarpaceae
- Genus: Rubroshorea
- Species: R. pilosa

Binomial name
- Rubroshorea pilosa (P.S.Ashton) P.S.Ashton & J.Heck.

Synonyms
- Shorea pilosa P.S.Ashton

Species of flowering plant

Rubroshorea pilosa is a tree in the family Dipterocarpaceae, native to Borneo.

The species was first described as Shorea pilosa by Peter Shaw Ashton in 1962. The specific epithet pilosa means 'hairy', referring to the indumentum. In 2022 Ashton and Jacqueline Heckenhauer placed the species in genus Rubroshorea as R. pilosa.

== Description ==
Rubroshorea pilosa grows up to 45 metres (150 ft) tall, with a trunk diameter of up to 1.3 m (4 ft). It has buttresses up to 4 m (13 ft) tall. The brown to yellowish bark is initially smooth, later becoming flaky. The leathery leaves are elliptic to ovate and measure up to 17 cm (7 in) long. The inflorescences bear pinkish cream flowers.

== Distribution and habitat ==
Rubroshorea pilosa is endemic to northern and northwestern Borneo. Its habitat is mixed dipterocarp forests, including on hilly land, to elevations of 900 m (3,000 ft).

== Conservation ==
Shorea pilosa has been assessed as near threatened on the IUCN Red List. It is threatened by conversion of land for intensive agriculture, including for palm oil plantations. It is also threatened by logging for its timber. The species does occur in a number of protected areas in Sabah and Sarawak.
