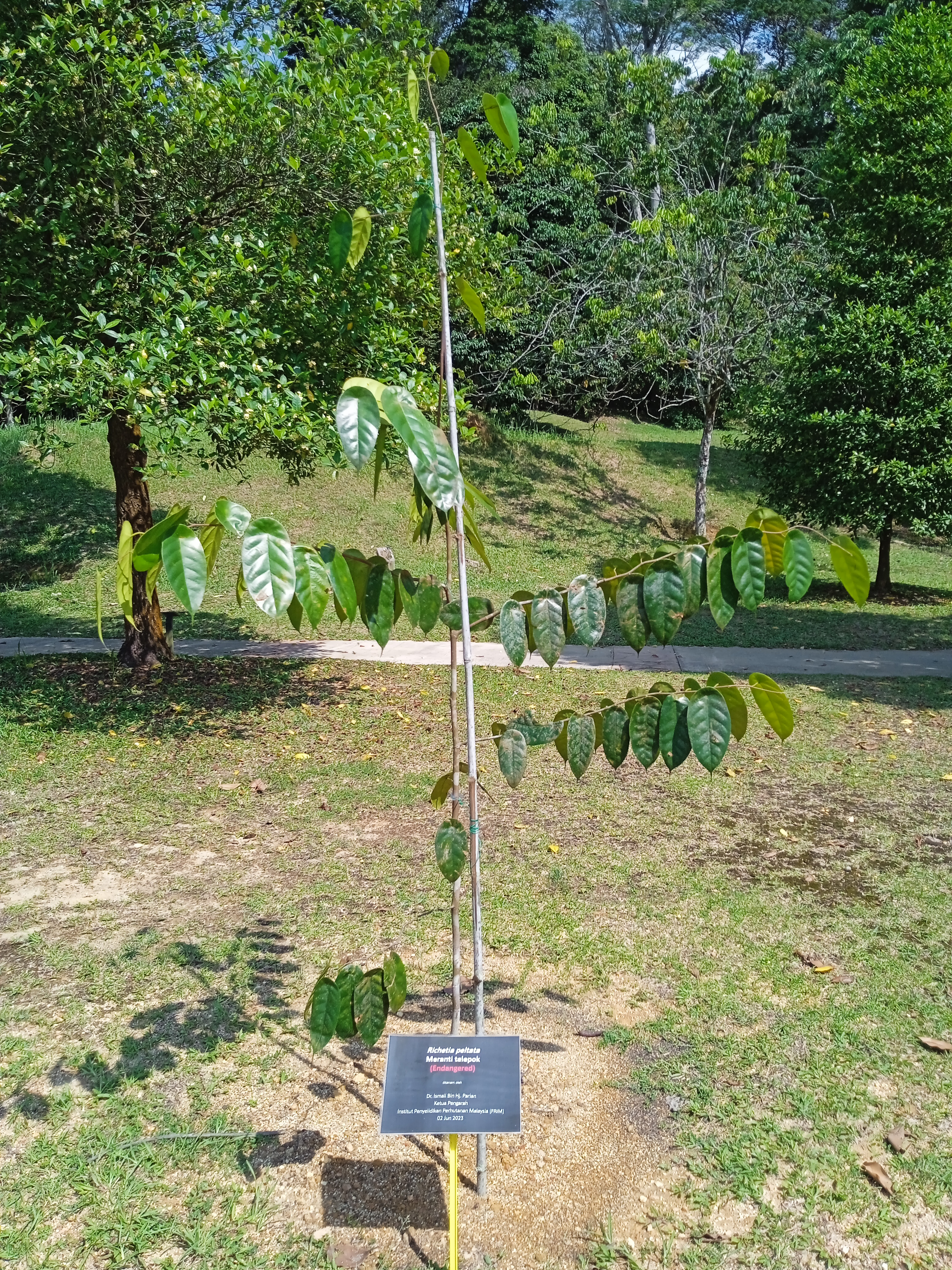

Conservation status
- Vulnerable (IUCN 3.1)

Scientific classification
- Kingdom: Plantae
- Clade: Tracheophytes
- Clade: Angiosperms
- Clade: Eudicots
- Clade: Rosids
- Order: Malvales
- Family: Dipterocarpaceae
- Genus: Richetia
- Species: R. peltata

Binomial name
- Richetia peltata (Symington) P.S.Ashton & J.Heck.

Synonyms
- Shorea peltata Symington

= Richetia peltata =

Species of flowering plant

Richetia peltata (or Shorea peltata; called, along with some other species in the genus Richetia, yellow meranti) is a species of plant in the family Dipterocarpaceae.

== Distribution ==
It is a tree found in Sumatra, Peninsular Malaysia and Borneo. Richetia peltata locally knows as damar hitam telepok, damar telepok, meranti damar hitam, meranti kelim, meranti kuning as well mernati telepok in Peninsular Malaysia. Meanwhile in Sabah, Malaysia, R. peltata is called seraya kuning keladi. The word of "telepok" in meranti telepok, damar hitam telepok or damar telepok is refers to its leaves that are peltate like those of the lotus.
