= Rubroshorea rugosa =

Conservation status
- Vulnerable (IUCN 3.1)

Scientific classification
- Kingdom: Plantae
- Clade: Tracheophytes
- Clade: Angiosperms
- Clade: Eudicots
- Clade: Rosids
- Order: Malvales
- Family: Dipterocarpaceae
- Genus: Rubroshorea
- Species: R. rugosa

Binomial name
- Rubroshorea rugosa (F.Heim) P.S.Ashton & J.Heck.

Synonyms
- Shorea rugosa F.Heim; Shorea verruculosa Dyer ex Brandis

Species of tree

Rubroshorea rugosa, called, along with some other dipterocarp species, dark red meranti, is a species of flowering plant in the family Dipterocarpaceae. It is a tree native to Borneo and Sumatra. It is a Vulnerable species threatened by habitat loss.

The species was first described as Shorea rugosa by Frédéric Louis Heim in 1891. In 2022 Peter Shaw Ashton and Jacqueline Heckenhauer placed the species in genus Rubroshorea as R. rugosa.
