= Richetia iliasii =

Conservation status
- Critically Endangered (IUCN 3.1)

Scientific classification
- Kingdom: Plantae
- Clade: Tracheophytes
- Clade: Angiosperms
- Clade: Eudicots
- Clade: Rosids
- Order: Malvales
- Family: Dipterocarpaceae
- Genus: Richetia
- Species: R. iliasii

Binomial name
- Richetia iliasii (P.S.Ashton) P.S.Ashton & J.Heck.

Synonyms
- Shorea iliasii P.S.Ashton

Species of tree

Richetia iliasii (also called yellow meranti) is a tree in the family Dipterocarpaceae. It is endemic to Borneo, where it grows in Sarawak and Kalimantan. It is a tall tree, growing up to 50 meters in height. It grows in lowland dipterocarp forests, on hillsides and on clay and sedimentary rock, up to 400 meters elevation.

The species is subject to habitat loss from forest clearance, and its extent of occurrence (EOO) declined by 80% between 2000 and 2018. The species' habitat loss was greater in Kalimantan than in Sarawak, where some populations grow in protected areas. The species is assessed as critically endangered by the IUCN.
