= Rubroshorea woodii =

Conservation status
- Endangered (IUCN 3.1)

Scientific classification
- Kingdom: Plantae
- Clade: Embryophytes
- Clade: Tracheophytes
- Clade: Angiosperms
- Clade: Eudicots
- Clade: Rosids
- Order: Malvales
- Family: Dipterocarpaceae
- Genus: Rubroshorea
- Species: R. woodii

Binomial name
- Rubroshorea woodii (P.S.Ashton) P.S.Ashton & J.Heck.

Synonyms
- Shorea woodii P.S.Ashton

Species of tree

Rubroshorea woodii is a tree in the family Dipterocarpaceae, native to Borneo.

It was first described as Shorea woodii by Peter Shaw Ashton in 2004. It is named for the botanist Geoffrey Wood. In 2022 Ashton and Jacqueline Heckenhauer placed the species in genus Rubroshorea as R. woodii.

== Description ==
Rubroshorea woodii grows up to 40 metres (130 ft) tall, with a trunk diameter of up to 60 cm (2 ft). The bark is smooth at first, becoming fissured. The red, leathery leaves are elliptic to ovate and measure up to 37 cm (15 in) long.

== Distribution and habitat ==
Rubroshorea woodii is endemic to Borneo, where it is confined to Sarawak. Its habitat is lowland mixed dipterocarp forests.

== Conservation ==
Rubroshorea woodii has been assessed as endangered on the IUCN Red List. It is threatened by land conversion for plantations. It is also threatened by logging for its timber. R. woodii does occur in one protected area: Bukit Mersing National Park.
