= Richetia faguetioides =

Conservation status
- Near Threatened (IUCN 3.1)

Scientific classification
- Kingdom: Plantae
- Clade: Embryophytes
- Clade: Tracheophytes
- Clade: Angiosperms
- Clade: Eudicots
- Clade: Rosids
- Order: Malvales
- Family: Dipterocarpaceae
- Genus: Richetia
- Species: R. faguetioides

Binomial name
- Richetia faguetioides (P.S.Ashton) P.S.Ashton & J.Heck.

Synonyms
- Shorea faguetioides P.S.Ashton

Species of tree

Richetia faguetioides is a tree in the family Dipterocarpaceae, native to Borneo. The specific epithet faguetioides refers to its similarity to Richetia faguetiana.

== Description ==
Richetia faguetioides grows up to 50 metres (160 ft) tall, with a trunk diameter of up to 1.4 m (5 ft). The flaky, cracked bark is greyish tan-coloured. The papery leaves are ovate and measure up to 18 cm (7 in) long. The inflorescences measure up to 15 cm (6 in) long and bear up to seven cream flowers. The nuts are egg-shaped and measure up to 2.0 cm (0.8 in) long.

== Distribution and habitat ==
Richetia faguetioides is endemic to Borneo. Its habitat is mixed dipterocarp forests, at elevations to 700 m (2,300 ft).

== Conservation ==
Richetia faguetioides has been assessed as near threatened on the IUCN Red List. It is threatened by conversion of land for agriculture and mining. It is also threatened by logging, sometimes for its timber. In Kalimantan, fires are an increasing threat. The species is found in some protected areas in Malaysian Borneo.
