= Rubroshorea mecistopteryx =

Conservation status
- Vulnerable (IUCN 3.1)

Scientific classification
- Kingdom: Plantae
- Clade: Embryophytes
- Clade: Tracheophytes
- Clade: Angiosperms
- Clade: Eudicots
- Clade: Rosids
- Order: Malvales
- Family: Dipterocarpaceae
- Genus: Rubroshorea
- Species: R. mecistopteryx

Binomial name
- Rubroshorea mecistopteryx (Ridl.) P.S.Ashton & J.Heck.

Synonyms
- Shorea chrysophylla Ridl.; Shorea mecistopteryx Ridl.

Species of tree

Rubroshorea mecistopteryx is a tree in the family Dipterocarpaceae, native to Borneo. It is commonly known, along with several other dipterocarp species, as red meranti.

The species was first described as Shorea mecistopteryx by Henry Nicholas Ridley in 1925. The specific epithet mecistopteryx means 'big wing', referring to the fruit's lobes. In 2022 Peter Shaw Ashton and Jacqueline Heckenhauer placed the species in genus Rubroshorea as R. mecistopteryx.

== Description ==
Rubroshorea mecistopteryx grows up to 50 metres (160 ft) tall, with a trunk diameter of up to 1.6 m (5 ft). It has buttresses up to 2 m (7 ft) tall. The smooth bark later becomes flaking and cracked. The papery leaves are oblong and measure up to 20 cm (8 in) long, occasionally 30 cm (12 in) long. The inflorescences measure up to 12 cm (5 in) long.

== Distribution and habitat ==
Rubroshorea mecistopteryx is endemic to Borneo. Its habitat is in coastal lowland dipterocarp forests to elevations of around 400 m (1,300 ft).

== Conservation ==
Rubroshorea mecistopteryx has been assessed as vulnerable on the IUCN Red List. It is threatened by conversion of land for agriculture, mainly for palm oil plantations. The species is also threatened by logging for its timber and the construction of logging roads. In Kalimantan, forest fires are a risk for the species. Rubroshorea mecistopteryx does occur in a number of protected areas.
