= Anthoshorea bentongensis =

Conservation status
- Vulnerable (IUCN 3.1)

Scientific classification
- Kingdom: Plantae
- Clade: Tracheophytes
- Clade: Angiosperms
- Clade: Eudicots
- Clade: Rosids
- Order: Malvales
- Family: Dipterocarpaceae
- Genus: Anthoshorea
- Species: A. bentongensis

Binomial name
- Anthoshorea bentongensis (Foxw.) P.S.Ashton & J.Heck. (2022)

Synonyms
- Shorea bentongensis Foxw. (1932); Shorea pahangensis Foxw. (1932)

Species of tree

Anthoshorea bentongensis (called, along with some other species in the genus Anthoshorea, white meranti) is a species of tree in the family Dipterocarpaceae. It is endemic to Peninsular Malaysia, where it is native to the states of Johor, Pahang, and Selangor. It grows in lowland and hill rain forest, generally in low-lying areas and deep valleys in hill forests. It is threatened by habitat loss.
