= Shorea falcata =

Conservation status
- Critically Endangered (IUCN 3.1)

Scientific classification
- Kingdom: Plantae
- Clade: Tracheophytes
- Clade: Angiosperms
- Clade: Eudicots
- Clade: Rosids
- Order: Malvales
- Family: Dipterocarpaceae
- Genus: Shorea
- Species: S. falcata

Binomial name
- Shorea falcata J.E.Vidal

Species of tree

Shorea falcata is a species of tree in the family Dipterocarpaceae. It is a tree endemic to Vietnam. It is a medium-sized tree which grows up to 15 meters tall. It is known only from two locations in southern coastal Vietnam, the Cam Ranh peninsula in Khánh Hòa province and Sông Cầu in Phú Yên province. It is native to lowland tropical dry forest, where it grows in pure stands on sandy soils and sand dunes. It can tolerate drought and infertile soils. Fruit is set between September and October in Cam Ranh and in July in Sông Cầu.

The species' habitat is declining in area, extent, and quality from urbanization and expansion of coastal resorts. Trees exhibit low regeneration and fruit yield in some of its sites. The species is now limited to three subpopulations, two in Cam Ranh and one in Sông Cầu, with only a few mature individuals at each site. The species' total population is estimated at fewer than 1,000 individual trees. The IUCN Red List assesses the species at Critically Endangered.

The species was described by Jules Eugène Vidal in 1962.
