= Anthoshorea polita =

Conservation status
- Least Concern (IUCN 3.1)

Scientific classification
- Kingdom: Plantae
- Clade: Tracheophytes
- Clade: Angiosperms
- Clade: Eudicots
- Clade: Rosids
- Order: Malvales
- Family: Dipterocarpaceae
- Genus: Anthoshorea
- Species: A. polita

Binomial name
- Anthoshorea polita (S.Vidal) P.S.Ashton & J.Heck. (2022)

Synonyms
- Shorea mindanensis Foxw. (1918); Shorea polita S.Vidal (1883)

Species of flowering plant

Anthoshorea polita is a species of flowering plant in the family Dipterocarpaceae. It is a tree endemic to the Philippines.

It is a medium-sized tree, 12 to 15 meters tall. It flowers from February to July, and sets fruit in April to May and in October.

It is native to karst limestone forests and lowland rain forests from 110 to 1,325 meters elevation. It grows in the provinces of Bulacan (Angat), Cagayan, Ilocos Sur, Laguna (Mt. Makiling), Nueva Ecija (Bongabon), Occidental Mindoro (Paluan), Palawan (Balabac Island), Pangasinan, Quezon (Pagbilao), Rizal, Zambales, Bohol, Leyte, Basilan, Davao, Misamis Occidental and Zamboanga. The species is subject to habitat loss from deforestation for commercial timber harvesting, shifting agriculture, urbanization, and mining, and conversion of natural forests to commodity crops and forest plantations.

The species was first described as Shorea polita by Sebastián Vidal y Soler in 1883. In 2022 Peter Shaw Ashton and Jacqueline Heckenhauer moved the species to genus Anthoshorea.
