= Rubroshorea rotundifolia =

Conservation status
- Critically Endangered (IUCN 3.1)

Scientific classification
- Kingdom: Plantae
- Clade: Tracheophytes
- Clade: Angiosperms
- Clade: Eudicots
- Clade: Rosids
- Order: Malvales
- Family: Dipterocarpaceae
- Genus: Rubroshorea
- Species: R. rotundifolia

Binomial name
- Rubroshorea rotundifolia (P.S.Ashton) P.S.Ashton & J.Heck.

Synonyms
- Shorea rotundifolia P.S.Ashton

Species of tree

Rubroshorea rotundifolia (also called light red meranti) is a species of plant in the family Dipterocarpaceae. It is a tree endemic to Borneo, where it is confined to Sarawak.

The species was first described as Shorea rotundifolia by Peter Shaw Ashton in 1967. In 2022 Ashton and Jacqueline Heckenhauer placed the species in genus Rubroshorea as R. rotundifolia.
