= Rubroshorea sagittata =

Conservation status
- Near Threatened (IUCN 3.1)

Scientific classification
- Kingdom: Plantae
- Clade: Tracheophytes
- Clade: Angiosperms
- Clade: Eudicots
- Clade: Rosids
- Order: Malvales
- Family: Dipterocarpaceae
- Genus: Rubroshorea
- Species: R. sagittata

Binomial name
- Rubroshorea sagittata (P.S.Ashton) P.S.Ashton & J.Heck.

Synonyms
- Shorea sagittata P.S.Ashton

Species of tree

Rubroshorea sagittata (called, along with some other dipterocarp species, light red meranti) is a species of plant in the family Dipterocarpaceae. It is a tree endemic to western and central Sarawak in northern Borneo. It is an emergent tree growing up to 45 metres tall in lowland and hill mixed dipterocarp forest up to 900 metres elevation.

The species was first described as Shorea sagittata by Peter Shaw Ashton in 1967. In 2022 Ashton and Jacqueline Heckenhauer placed the species in genus Rubroshorea as R. sagittata.
