= Richetia longiflora =

Conservation status
- Vulnerable (IUCN 3.1)

Scientific classification
- Kingdom: Plantae
- Clade: Tracheophytes
- Clade: Angiosperms
- Clade: Eudicots
- Clade: Rosids
- Order: Malvales
- Family: Dipterocarpaceae
- Subfamily: Dipterocarpoideae
- Tribe: Shoreae
- Genus: Richetia
- Species: R. longiflora

Binomial name
- Richetia longiflora (Brandis) P.S.Ashton & J.Heck.

Synonyms
- Balanocarpus longiflorus (Brandis) Foxw. ex Symington; Hopea longiflora Brandis; Shorea longiflora (Brandis) Symington

Species of tree

Shorea longiflora is a species of tropical lowland rainforest tree in the family Dipterocarpaceae. It is endemic to Borneo.

The IUCN lists this species as threatened.
