= Rubroshorea palembanica =

Conservation status
- Near Threatened (IUCN 3.1)

Scientific classification
- Kingdom: Plantae
- Clade: Tracheophytes
- Clade: Angiosperms
- Clade: Eudicots
- Clade: Rosids
- Order: Malvales
- Family: Dipterocarpaceae
- Genus: Rubroshorea
- Species: R. palembanica

Binomial name
- Rubroshorea palembanica (Miq.) P.S.Ashton & J.Heck.

Synonyms
- Shorea aptera Burck; Shorea brachyptera F.Heim; Shorea palembanica Miq. (1861) (basionym)

Species of tree

Rubroshorea palembanica (called, along with some other dipterocarp species, light red meranti) is a species of flowering plant in the family Dipterocarpaceae. It is a tree native to Peninsular Malaysia, Borneo, and Sumatra. It is a tall tree, growing up to 45 metres high in riverine areas and freshwater swamp forest. It is threatened by habitat loss.
