= Shorea dyeri =

Conservation status
- Vulnerable (IUCN 3.1)

Scientific classification
- Kingdom: Plantae
- Clade: Tracheophytes
- Clade: Angiosperms
- Clade: Eudicots
- Clade: Rosids
- Order: Malvales
- Family: Dipterocarpaceae
- Genus: Shorea
- Species: S. dyeri

Binomial name
- Shorea dyeri Thwaites ex Trimen

Species of tree

Shorea dyeri is a species of plant in the family Dipterocarpaceae. It is endemic to Sri Lanka.

== Culture ==
Known as යකහලු දුන් (yakahalu dun) in Sinhala.
