= Shorea submontana =

Conservation status
- Near Threatened (IUCN 3.1)

Scientific classification
- Kingdom: Plantae
- Clade: Tracheophytes
- Clade: Angiosperms
- Clade: Eudicots
- Clade: Rosids
- Order: Malvales
- Family: Dipterocarpaceae
- Genus: Shorea
- Species: S. submontana

Binomial name
- Shorea submontana Symington

Synonyms
- Shorea costata King

Species of tree

Shorea submontana is a species of tree in the family Dipterocarpaceae. It is endemic to Peninsular Malaysia. It grows in tropical rain forest, ranging from 300 to 1,000 metres elevation. It is most common in submontane forest at about 800 metres in the inland ranges, around the upper limits of Rubroshorea curtisii (seraya) forest.
