= Shorea arsorianoi =

Conservation status
- Endangered (IUCN 3.1)

Scientific classification
- Kingdom: Plantae
- Clade: Tracheophytes
- Clade: Angiosperms
- Clade: Eudicots
- Clade: Rosids
- Order: Malvales
- Family: Dipterocarpaceae
- Genus: Shorea
- Species: S. arsorianoi

Binomial name
- Shorea arsorianoi H.G.Gut., Rojo & Madulid (2010)

Species of flowering plant

Shorea arsorianoi is a species of flowering plant in the family Dipterocarpaceae. It is a tree endemic to the Philippines, where it is native to the provinces of Davao del Norte, Davao del Sur, and Surigao del Sur on the island of Mindanao. It is a large tree, from 30 to 50 meters in height and a trunk up to 100 cm in diameter at breast height. It grows in lowland rain forest.
