= Rubroshorea flaviflora =

Conservation status
- Vulnerable (IUCN 3.1)

Scientific classification
- Kingdom: Plantae
- Clade: Tracheophytes
- Clade: Angiosperms
- Clade: Eudicots
- Clade: Rosids
- Order: Malvales
- Family: Dipterocarpaceae
- Genus: Rubroshorea
- Species: R. flaviflora

Binomial name
- Rubroshorea flaviflora (G.H.S.Wood ex P.S.Ashton) P.S.Ashton & J.Heck.

Synonyms
- Shorea flaviflora G.H.S.Wood ex P.S.Ashton

Species of tree

Rubroshorea flaviflora (called, along with some other species in the genus Rubroshorea, dark red meranti) is a species of plant in the family Dipterocarpaceae. It is endemic to northern Borneo.
