= Rubroshorea amplexicaulis =

Conservation status
- Near Threatened (IUCN 3.1)

Scientific classification
- Kingdom: Plantae
- Clade: Embryophytes
- Clade: Tracheophytes
- Clade: Angiosperms
- Clade: Eudicots
- Clade: Rosids
- Order: Malvales
- Family: Dipterocarpaceae
- Genus: Rubroshorea
- Species: R. amplexicaulis

Binomial name
- Rubroshorea amplexicaulis (P.S.Ashton) P.S.Ashton & J.Heck.

Synonyms
- Shorea amplexicaulis P.S.Ashton

Species of tree

Rubroshorea amplexicaulis is a tree in the family Dipterocarpaceae, native to Borneo.

== Description ==
Rubroshorea amplexicaulis grows up to 50 metres (160 ft) tall, with a trunk diameter of up to 1.2 m (4 ft). It has buttresses. The smooth bark is greyish brown. The leathery leaves are elliptic and measure up to 21 cm (8 in) long. The inflorescences measure up to 24 cm (9 in) long and bear up to 11 yellow flowers. The nuts are egg-shaped and measure up to 3.7 cm (1.5 in) long.

== Distribution and habitat ==
Rubroshorea amplexicaulis is endemic to Borneo. Its habitat is mixed dipterocarp forests, up to 700 m (2,300 ft) elevation.

== Conservation ==
Rubroshorea amplexicaulis has been assessed as near threatened on the IUCN Red List. It is threatened by conversion of land for plantations and by logging for its timber. The species is found in some protected areas.

== Taxonomy ==
The species was first described as Shorea aplexicaulis by Peter Shaw Ashton in 1962. In 2022 Ashton and Jacqueline Heckenhauer placed the species in genus Rubroshorea as R. amplexicaulis. The specific epithet amplexicaulis means 'clasping the stem' and refers to the position of the leaf stalk or petiole.
