= Rubroshorea parvistipulata =

Conservation status
- Least Concern (IUCN 3.1)

Scientific classification
- Kingdom: Plantae
- Clade: Tracheophytes
- Clade: Angiosperms
- Clade: Eudicots
- Clade: Rosids
- Order: Malvales
- Family: Dipterocarpaceae
- Genus: Rubroshorea
- Species: R. parvistipulata

Binomial name
- Rubroshorea parvistipulata (F.Heim) P.S.Ashton & J.Heck.

Synonyms
- Shorea nebulosa Meijer; Shorea parvistipulata F.Heim (1891) (basionym); Shorea parvistipulata subsp. albifolia P.S.Ashton; Shorea parvistipulata subsp. nebulosa (Meijer) P.S.Ashton; Shorea parvistipulata subsp. parvistipulata

Species of tree

Rubroshorea parvistipulata, locally known as kawang daun merah, is a species of tree in the family Dipterocarpaceae. It is endemic to Borneo, where it is widespread in lowland and hill rain forests.

The species was first described as Shorea parvistipulata by Frédéric Louis Heim in 1891. In 2022 Peter Shaw Ashton and Jacqueline Heckenhauer placed the species in genus Rubroshorea as R. parvistipulata.

== Description ==
Rubroshorea parvistipulata is a large emergent tree, which can grow up to 70 meters high.

== Range and habitat ==
Rutbroshorea parvistipulata is widespread on the island, present in Sabah and Sarawak states of Malaysia, Kalimantan (Indonesian Borneo), and Brunei. It grows in lowland mixed dipterocarp forest and lower montane mixed dipterocarp forest, up to 1,300 meters elevation.
