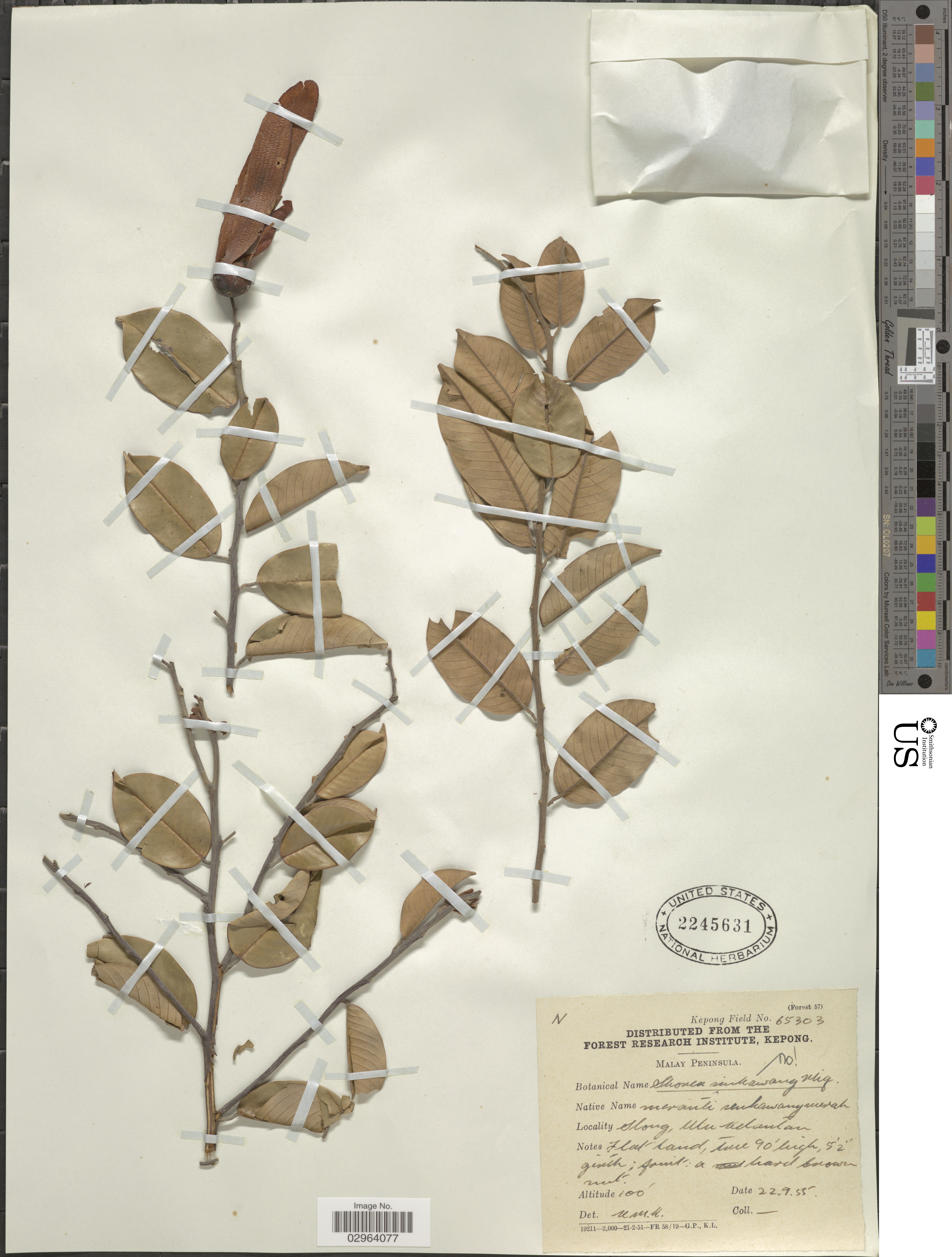
- Specimen

Conservation status
- Vulnerable (IUCN 3.1)

Scientific classification
- Kingdom: Plantae
- Clade: Embryophytes
- Clade: Tracheophytes
- Clade: Angiosperms
- Clade: Eudicots
- Clade: Rosids
- Order: Malvales
- Family: Dipterocarpaceae
- Genus: Rubroshorea
- Species: R. singkawang

Binomial name
- Rubroshorea singkawang (Miq.) P.S.Ashton & J.Heck.

Synonyms
- Hopea singkawang Miq. (1861) (basionym); Pachychlamys thiseltonii (King) Ridl.; Shorea singkawang (Miq.) Burck; Shorea singkawang subsp. scabrosa P.S.Ashton; Shorea singkawang subsp. singkawang; Shorea thiseltonii King

= Rubroshorea singkawang =

Species of tree

Rubroshorea singkawang (called, along with some other dipterocarp species, dark red meranti or meranti merah) is a species of flowering plant in the family Dipterocarpaceae. It is a tree which grows up to 30 metres tall. It is native to Sumatra, Peninsular Malaysia, and Thailand, where it grows in lowland evergreen rain forest. It is threatened by habitat loss.

The species was first described as Hopea singkawang by Friedrich Anton Wilhelm Miquel in 1861. In 2022 Peter Shaw Ashton and Jacqueline Heckenhauer placed it in genus Rubroshorea as R. singkawang.
