= Anthoshorea montigena =

Conservation status
- Critically Endangered (IUCN 3.1)

Scientific classification
- Kingdom: Plantae
- Clade: Tracheophytes
- Clade: Angiosperms
- Clade: Eudicots
- Clade: Rosids
- Order: Malvales
- Family: Dipterocarpaceae
- Genus: Anthoshorea
- Species: A. montigena

Binomial name
- Anthoshorea montigena (Slooten) P.S.Ashton & J.Heck. (2022)

Synonyms
- Shorea balangeran var. binnendijkii Boerl. (1901); Shorea montigena Slooten (1952)

Species of tree

Anthoshorea montigena is a species of plant in the family Dipterocarpaceae. It is a tree native to northeastern Sulawesi and the Maluku Islands in Indonesia.
