= Shorea asahi =

Conservation status
- Near Threatened (IUCN 3.1)

Scientific classification
- Kingdom: Plantae
- Clade: Tracheophytes
- Clade: Angiosperms
- Clade: Eudicots
- Clade: Rosids
- Order: Malvales
- Family: Dipterocarpaceae
- Genus: Shorea
- Species: S. asahi

Binomial name
- Shorea asahi P.S.Ashton

Species of tree

Shorea asahi is a species of plant in the family Dipterocarpaceae. It is a tree endemic to Borneo.
