= Shorea pallescens =

Conservation status
- Endangered (IUCN 3.1)

Scientific classification
- Kingdom: Plantae
- Clade: Tracheophytes
- Clade: Angiosperms
- Clade: Eudicots
- Clade: Rosids
- Order: Malvales
- Family: Dipterocarpaceae
- Genus: Shorea
- Species: S. pallescens

Binomial name
- Shorea pallescens P.S.Ashton

Species of tree

Shorea pallescens is a species of flowering plant in the family Dipterocarpaceae. It is a tree endemic to Sri Lanka. It is native to southwestern Sri Lanka, where it grows in lowland evergreen rain forest.
