= Richetia balanocarpoides =

Conservation status
- Least Concern (IUCN 3.1)

Scientific classification
- Kingdom: Plantae
- Clade: Tracheophytes
- Clade: Angiosperms
- Clade: Eudicots
- Clade: Rosids
- Order: Malvales
- Family: Dipterocarpaceae
- Genus: Richetia
- Species: R. balanocarpoides

Binomial name
- Richetia balanocarpoides (Symington) P.S.Ashton & J.Heck. (2022)

Synonyms
- Balanocarpus pahangensis Foxw. (1932); Shorea balanocarpoides Symington (1938); Shorea dolichocarpa Slooten (1956)

Species of tree

Richetia balanocarpoides (called, along with some other species in the genus Richetia, yellow meranti or white meranti) is a species of plant in the family Dipterocarpaceae. It is found in Sumatra, Peninsular Malaysia and Borneo.
