= Rubroshorea dasyphylla =

Conservation status
- Near Threatened (IUCN 3.1)

Scientific classification
- Kingdom: Plantae
- Clade: Embryophytes
- Clade: Tracheophytes
- Clade: Angiosperms
- Clade: Eudicots
- Clade: Rosids
- Order: Malvales
- Family: Dipterocarpaceae
- Genus: Rubroshorea
- Species: R. dasyphylla

Binomial name
- Rubroshorea dasyphylla (Foxw.) P.S.Ashton & J.Heck.

Synonyms
- Shorea dasyphylla Foxw.

Species of tree

Rubroshorea dasyphylla, synonym Shorea dasyphylla, is an endangered species of plant in the family Dipterocarpaceae. It is native to Sumatra, Peninsular Malaysia and Borneo.
