= Rubroshorea kunstleri =

Conservation status
- Least Concern (IUCN 3.1)

Scientific classification
- Kingdom: Plantae
- Clade: Tracheophytes
- Clade: Angiosperms
- Clade: Eudicots
- Clade: Rosids
- Order: Malvales
- Family: Dipterocarpaceae
- Genus: Rubroshorea
- Species: R. kunstleri

Binomial name
- Rubroshorea kunstleri (King) P.S.Ashton & J.Heck.

Synonyms
- Shorea kunstleri King

Species of tree

Rubroshorea kunstleri (called, along with some other species, red balau) is a species of flowering plant in the family Dipterocarpaceae. It is a tree native to Sumatra, Peninsular Malaysia, and Borneo.

It is a large tree growing up to 55 metres tall, with a straight cylindrical bole supported by spreading buttresses, branching into a few large ascending limbs that create a large, loose, cauliflower-shaped crown. It is native to lowland mixed dipterocarp rain forests up to 800 metres elevation, where it grows on leached sandy clay soils on low hills and ridges.
