= Shorea lissophylla =

Conservation status
- Vulnerable (IUCN 3.1)

Scientific classification
- Kingdom: Plantae
- Clade: Tracheophytes
- Clade: Angiosperms
- Clade: Eudicots
- Clade: Rosids
- Order: Malvales
- Family: Dipterocarpaceae
- Genus: Shorea
- Species: S. lissophylla

Binomial name
- Shorea lissophylla Thwaites

Synonyms
- Isoptera lissophylla (Thwaites) Livera

Species of plant

Shorea lissophylla is a species of flowering plant in the family Dipterocarpaceae. It is a small tree endemic to Sri Lanka. It is native to the lowland rain forests of southwestern Sri Lanka, where it grows in shallow poor soil on hilltop and streamside rock outcrops.

The species was described by George Henry Kendrick Thwaites in 1864.
