= Rubroshorea splendida =

Conservation status
- Endangered (IUCN 3.1)

Scientific classification
- Kingdom: Plantae
- Clade: Embryophytes
- Clade: Tracheophytes
- Clade: Angiosperms
- Clade: Eudicots
- Clade: Rosids
- Order: Malvales
- Family: Dipterocarpaceae
- Genus: Rubroshorea
- Species: R. splendida

Binomial name
- Rubroshorea splendida (de Vriese) P.S.Ashton & J.Heck.

Synonyms
- Hopea splendida de Vriese; Shorea splendida (de Vriese) P.S.Ashton; Shorea martiniana Scheff.

Species of tree

Rubroshorea splendida, synonym Shorea splendida, is a species of plant in the family Dipterocarpaceae. It is a tree endemic to Borneo. It is threatened by habitat loss.
