= Rubroshorea waltoni =

Conservation status
- Near Threatened (IUCN 3.1)

Scientific classification
- Kingdom: Plantae
- Clade: Tracheophytes
- Clade: Angiosperms
- Clade: Eudicots
- Clade: Rosids
- Order: Malvales
- Family: Dipterocarpaceae
- Genus: Rubroshorea
- Species: R. waltoni

Binomial name
- Rubroshorea waltoni (G.H.S.Wood ex Meijer) P.S.Ashton & J.Heck.

Synonyms
- Shorea waltoni G.H.S.Wood ex Meijer

Species of tree

Rubroshorea waltoni is a species of plant in the family Dipterocarpaceae. It is a large emergent tree up to 60 m tall. The local name seraya kelabu refers to the grey undersurface of the leaf. It is endemic to Borneo, where it is confined to Sabah.
