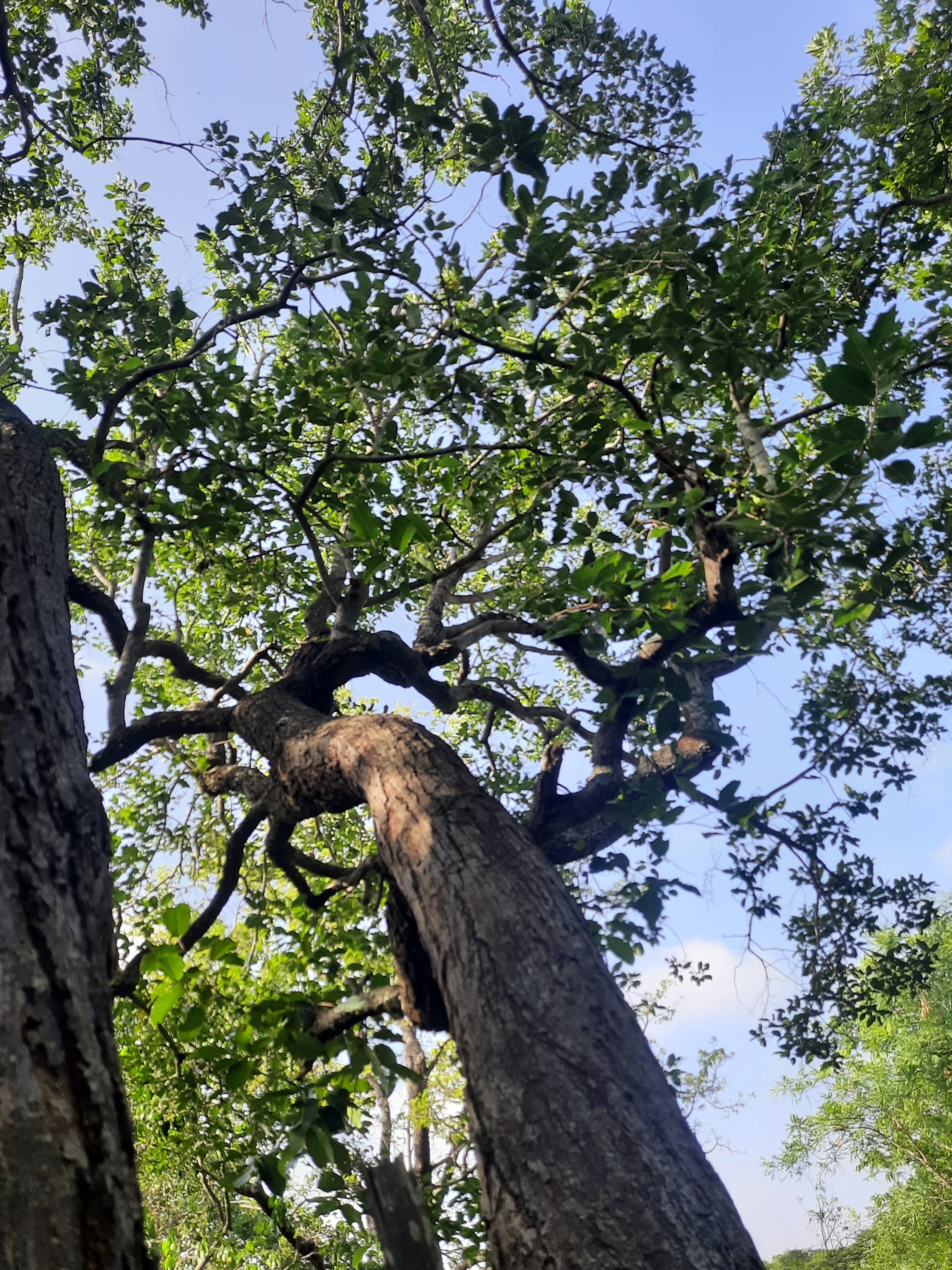

Conservation status
- Endangered (IUCN 3.1)

Scientific classification
- Kingdom: Plantae
- Clade: Tracheophytes
- Clade: Angiosperms
- Clade: Eudicots
- Clade: Rosids
- Order: Malvales
- Family: Dipterocarpaceae
- Genus: Shorea
- Species: S. tumbugaia

Binomial name
- Shorea tumbugaia Roxb.

= Shorea tumbugaia =

Species of tree

Shorea tumbugaia, also known as the tamba jalari in Hindi, is an endangered species of deciduous tree in the family Dipterocarpaceae. It is considered endemic to Southern India, found specifically in the Eastern Ghats, in states such as Andhra Pradesh and Tamil Nadu. The species is found widely in Seshachalam and Veligonda hills in Cuddapah and Tirupati hills of Chittoor district of Andhra Pradesh to North Arcot and Chingleput, districts of Tamil Nadu. It is known for its resin, used for its medicinal properties, and its smooth wood, commonly used as timber.

== Uses ==
The species is commercially exploited for its timber and therapeutic purposes. The heart wood is similar to sal but much smoother and better for carpentry. Plant parts are to be used as an external stimulant. The plant extracts used to cure ear-aches. Leaf juice is used as ear drops. The bark having anti ulcer activity. The stem is a source of resin, which is used as incense. The resin used to cure duodenal ulcers and amoebic dysentery. It is also used in indigenous medicine as an external stimulant and a substitute for arbutus for children.
