= Rubroshorea pubistyla =

Conservation status
- Least Concern (IUCN 3.1)

Scientific classification
- Kingdom: Plantae
- Clade: Tracheophytes
- Clade: Angiosperms
- Clade: Eudicots
- Clade: Rosids
- Order: Malvales
- Family: Dipterocarpaceae
- Genus: Rubroshorea
- Species: R. pubistyla

Binomial name
- Rubroshorea pubistyla (P.S.Ashton) P.S.Ashton & J.Heck.

Synonyms
- Shorea pubistyla P.S.Ashton

Species of tree

Rubroshorea pubistyla is a species of flowering plant in the family Dipterocarpaceae. It is a tree endemic to Borneo, which occurs in Sarawak and West Kalimantan. It grows up to 30 metres in height in lowland mixed dipterocarp rain forest on low hills up to 500 metres elevation.

The species was first described as Shorea pubistyla by Peter Shaw Ashton in 1967. In 2022 Ashton and Jacqueline Heckenhauer placed the species in genus Rubroshorea as R. pubistyla.
