= Shorea scrobiculata =

Conservation status
- Near Threatened (IUCN 3.1)

Scientific classification
- Kingdom: Plantae
- Clade: Tracheophytes
- Clade: Angiosperms
- Clade: Eudicots
- Clade: Rosids
- Order: Malvales
- Family: Dipterocarpaceae
- Genus: Shorea
- Species: S. scrobiculata

Binomial name
- Shorea scrobiculata Burck

Synonyms
- Shorea meadiana Symington; Shorea pierreana F.Heim

Species of flowering plant

Shorea scrobiculata is a tree in the family Dipterocarpaceae.

== Description ==
Shorea scrobiculata grows up to 40 metres (130 ft) tall, with a trunk diameter of up to 1.2 m (4 ft). It has buttresses up to 0.7 m (2 ft) tall. The yellowish to brown bark is cracked and flaky. The leathery leaves are ovate to lanceolate and measure up to 11 cm (4 in) long. The inflorescences bear pink flowers.

== Taxonomy ==
Shorea scrobiculata was described by Dutch botanist William Burck in 1887. The lectotype was collected in Matang in Sarawak. The specific epithet scrobiculata means 'sawdust-like', referring to the indumentum of the flowers.

== Distribution and habitat ==
Shorea scrobiculata is native to Peninsular Malaysia and Borneo. Its habitat is hill and mixed dipterocarp forests, to elevations of 700 m (2,300 ft).

== Conservation ==
Shorea scrobiculata has been assessed as near threatened on the IUCN Red List. It is threatened by conversion of land for palm oil and other plantations. It is also threatened by logging for its timber and by human settlement and mining. Shorea scrobiculata does occur in a number of protected areas.
