= Rubroshorea acuta =

Conservation status
- Least Concern (IUCN 3.1)

Scientific classification
- Kingdom: Plantae
- Clade: Tracheophytes
- Clade: Angiosperms
- Clade: Eudicots
- Clade: Rosids
- Order: Malvales
- Family: Dipterocarpaceae
- Genus: Rubroshorea
- Species: R. acuta

Binomial name
- Rubroshorea acuta (P.S.Ashton) P.S.Ashton & J.Heck.

Synonyms
- Shorea acuta P.S.Ashton

Species of tree

Rubroshorea acuta is a species of plant in the family Dipterocarpaceae. It is endemic to Brunei and northeastern Sarawak on the island of Borneo. It is a tree which grows up to 45 metres tall in lowland mixed dipterocarp rain forest.

The species was first described as Shorea acuta by Peter Shaw Ashton in 1962. In 2022 Ashton and Jacqueline Heckenhauer placed it in the genus Rubroshorea as R. acuta.
