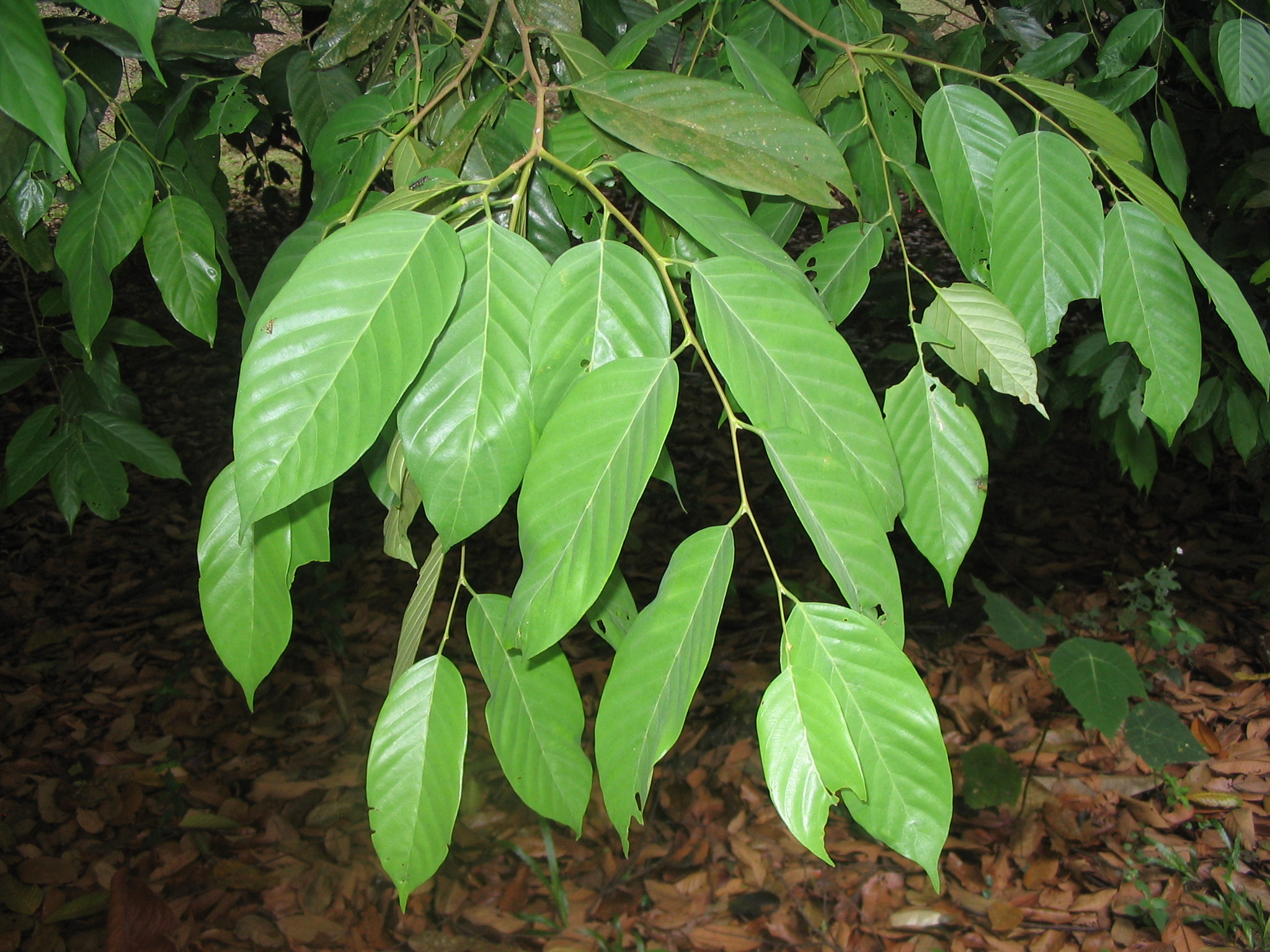

Conservation status
- Endangered (IUCN 3.1)

Scientific classification
- Kingdom: Plantae
- Clade: Tracheophytes
- Clade: Angiosperms
- Clade: Eudicots
- Clade: Rosids
- Order: Malvales
- Family: Dipterocarpaceae
- Genus: Shorea
- Species: S. sumatrana

Binomial name
- Shorea sumatrana (Slooten ex Thorenaar) Desch

Synonyms
- Isoptera sumatrana Slooten ex Thorenaar

= Shorea sumatrana =

Species of tree

Shorea sumatrana is a species of tree in the family Dipterocarpaceae. It grows naturally in Sumatra, Java and Peninsular Malaysia.
