= Pterygota (disambiguation) =

Pterygota may refer to:

- Pterygota, a subclass of insects that includes the winged insects
- Hopea pterygota, a flowering plant in the family Dipterocarpaceae
- Pterygota (plant), a genus of plants in the family Sterculiaceae
