= H. ferruginea =

H. ferruginea may refer to:

- Hirundinea ferruginea, the cliff flycatcher, a bird species
- Hopea ferruginea, a plant species found in Brunei, Indonesia and Malaysia

== Synonyms ==
- Hannoa ferruginea, a synonym for Quassia sanguinea, a plant species found in Cameroon

== See also ==
- Ferruginea (disambiguation)
