= Hopea cagayanensis =

Conservation status
- Endangered (IUCN 3.1)

Scientific classification
- Kingdom: Plantae
- Clade: Tracheophytes
- Clade: Angiosperms
- Clade: Eudicots
- Clade: Rosids
- Order: Malvales
- Family: Dipterocarpaceae
- Genus: Hopea
- Species: H. cagayanensis

Binomial name
- Hopea cagayanensis (Foxw.) Slooten

Synonyms
- Balanocarpus cagayanensis Foxw.

Species of tree

Hopea cagayanensis is a species of flowering plant in the family Dipterocarpaceae. It is a tree endemic to northeastern Luzon in the Philippines. It is native to lowland dipterocarp rain forest of the Lauan-Yakal type in Apayao, Cagayan and Ilocos Norte provinces. It flowers once every 4 to 6 years in May.

The species was first described as Balanocarpus cagayanensis by Frederick William Foxworthy in 1918. In 1956 Dirk Fok van Slooten placed the species in genus Hopea as H. cagayanensis.
