= Hopea rugifolia =

Conservation status
- Least Concern (IUCN 3.1)

Scientific classification
- Kingdom: Plantae
- Clade: Embryophytes
- Clade: Tracheophytes
- Clade: Angiosperms
- Clade: Eudicots
- Clade: Rosids
- Order: Malvales
- Family: Dipterocarpaceae
- Genus: Hopea
- Species: H. rugifolia

Binomial name
- Hopea rugifolia P.S.Ashton

Species of tree

Hopea rugifolia is a tree in the family Dipterocarpaceae, native to Borneo. The specific epithet rugifolia means 'wrinkled leaf', referring to the dried leaf.

== Description ==
Hopea rugifolia grows up to 20 metres (70 ft) tall, with a trunk diameter of up to 20 cm (8 in). It has buttresses and stilt roots. The bark is smooth. The papery leaves are lanceolate and measure up to 9 cm (4 in) long. The inflorescences measure up to 4 cm (1.6 in) long and bear up to six purple flowers. The nuts are egg-shaped and measure up to 1 cm (0.4 in) long.

== Distribution and habitat ==
Hopea rugifolia is endemic to Borneo. Its habitat is lowland dipterocarp forests, at elevations of 100–800 m (300–2,600 ft).
