= Hopea celebica =

Conservation status
- Endangered (IUCN 3.1)

Scientific classification
- Kingdom: Plantae
- Clade: Tracheophytes
- Clade: Angiosperms
- Clade: Eudicots
- Clade: Rosids
- Order: Malvales
- Family: Dipterocarpaceae
- Genus: Hopea
- Species: H. celebica

Binomial name
- Hopea celebica Burck

Synonyms
- Hopea dolosa Slooten

Species of tree

Hopea celebica is a species of flowering plant in the family Dipterocarpaceae. It is a tree native to central and southern Sulawesi. It is a large tree, which can grow up to 40 meters tall with a trunk up to 100 cm in diameter. It flowers unpredictably, with about three months between flowering and fruiting. It grows in lowland rain forest below 500 meters elevation.

The species was described by William Burck in 1887.
