= Hopea pierrei =

Conservation status
- Vulnerable (IUCN 3.1)

Scientific classification
- Kingdom: Plantae
- Clade: Tracheophytes
- Clade: Angiosperms
- Clade: Eudicots
- Clade: Rosids
- Order: Malvales
- Family: Dipterocarpaceae
- Genus: Hopea
- Species: H. pierrei

Binomial name
- Hopea pierrei Hance

Synonyms
- Hancea pierrei (Hance) Pierre; Hopea avellanea F.Heim; Hopea micrantha Hance; Hopea siamensis F.Heim

Species of tree

Hopea pierrei is a species of plant in the family Dipterocarpaceae. It is an endangered tree native to Cambodia, where it is still relatively abundant in the Cardamom Mountains, but rare in Laos, Peninsular Malaysia, Thailand, and Vietnam.
