= Hopea centipeda =

Conservation status
- Endangered (IUCN 3.1)

Scientific classification
- Kingdom: Plantae
- Clade: Embryophytes
- Clade: Tracheophytes
- Clade: Angiosperms
- Clade: Eudicots
- Clade: Rosids
- Order: Malvales
- Family: Dipterocarpaceae
- Genus: Hopea
- Species: H. centipeda

Binomial name
- Hopea centipeda P.S.Ashton

Species of tree

Hopea centipeda is a tree in the family Dipterocarpaceae, native to Borneo. The specific epithet centipeda means "hundred feet", referring to the stilt roots.

== Description ==
Hopea centipeda grows up to 30 metres (100 ft) tall, with a trunk diameter of up to 60 cm (24 in). It has flying (detached) buttresses and stilt roots up to 3 m (10 ft) tall. The bark is smooth. The papery leaves are lanceolate and measure up to 9 cm (4 in) long. The inflorescences measure up to 2 cm (1 in) long and bear cream flowers with a pink base. The nuts are egg-shaped and measure up to 0.4 cm (0.2 in) long.

== Distribution and habitat ==
Hopea centipeda is endemic to Borneo. Its habitat is by rivers, at elevations to 300 m (1,000 ft).

== Conservation ==
Hopea centipeda has been assessed as endangered on the IUCN Red List. It is threatened by land conversion for plantations and by logging for its timber. The species is found in some protected areas.
