= Hopea malibato =

Conservation status
- Vulnerable (IUCN 3.1)

Scientific classification
- Kingdom: Plantae
- Clade: Tracheophytes
- Clade: Angiosperms
- Clade: Eudicots
- Clade: Rosids
- Order: Malvales
- Family: Dipterocarpaceae
- Genus: Hopea
- Species: H. malibato

Binomial name
- Hopea malibato Foxw.

Species of tree

Hopea malibato is a species of plant in the family Dipterocarpaceae. It is endemic to the Philippines.

Hopea malibato produces the oligostilbenes malibatol A and B, dibalanocarpol and balanocarpol.
