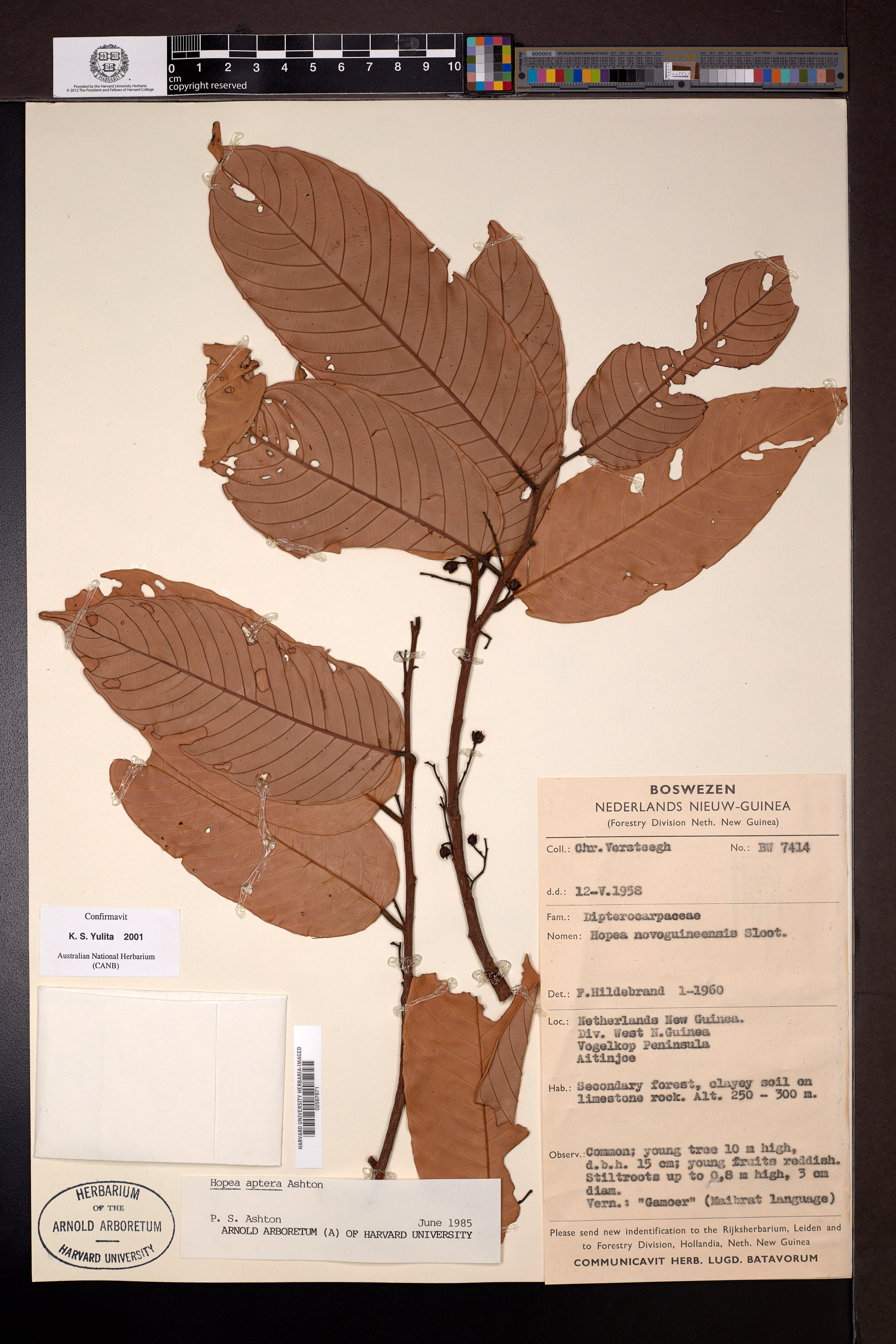

Conservation status
- Data Deficient (IUCN 3.1)

Scientific classification
- Kingdom: Plantae
- Clade: Embryophytes
- Clade: Tracheophytes
- Clade: Spermatophytes
- Clade: Angiosperms
- Clade: Eudicots
- Clade: Rosids
- Order: Malvales
- Family: Dipterocarpaceae
- Genus: Hopea
- Species: H. aptera

Binomial name
- Hopea aptera P.S.Ashton

= Hopea aptera =

Species of tropical tree

Hopea aptera is a species of plant in the family Dipterocarpaceae. It is endemic to the Bird's Head Peninsula of Western New Guinea. It is a small tree, which grows 7 to 10 meters tall. It is native to primary or secondary lowland rain forest, typically on clay soils over limestone, from 250 to 300 meters elevation.

The tree is harvested from the wild for its timber, which is widely used within the tree's native range. The plant is classified as 'Data Deficient' in the IUCN Red List of Threatened Species.

The species was described by Peter Shaw Ashton in 1978.
