= Hopea subpeltata =

Scientific classification
- Kingdom: Plantae
- Clade: Tracheophytes
- Clade: Angiosperms
- Clade: Eudicots
- Clade: Rosids
- Order: Malvales
- Family: Dipterocarpaceae
- Genus: Hopea
- Species: H. subpeltata

Binomial name
- Hopea subpeltata Poopath & Pooma

Species of flowering plant

Hopea subpeltata is a species of flowering plant in the family Dipterocarpaceae. It is a tree endemic to Thailand.

The species was first described by Manop Poopath and Rachun Pooma in 2017.
