= Hopea recopei =

Conservation status
- Endangered (IUCN 3.1)

Scientific classification
- Kingdom: Plantae
- Clade: Tracheophytes
- Clade: Angiosperms
- Clade: Eudicots
- Clade: Rosids
- Order: Malvales
- Family: Dipterocarpaceae
- Genus: Hopea
- Species: H. recopei

Binomial name
- Hopea recopei Pierre

Synonyms
- Hopea schmidtii F.Heim

Species of tree

Hopea recopei is a species of flowering plant in the family Dipterocarpaceae. It is a tree native to Cambodia, Laos, Thailand, and Vietnam. It grows in lowland tropical moist forest up to 250 meters elevation.

The species was described by Jean Baptiste Louis Pierre in 1891. A sample collected by J.B.L. Pierre in March 1867 is stored in the Kew Herbarium.
