= Hopea montana =

Conservation status
- Near Threatened (IUCN 3.1)

Scientific classification
- Kingdom: Plantae
- Clade: Tracheophytes
- Clade: Angiosperms
- Clade: Eudicots
- Clade: Rosids
- Order: Malvales
- Family: Dipterocarpaceae
- Genus: Hopea
- Species: H. montana

Binomial name
- Hopea montana Symington

Species of tree

Hopea montana is a species of flowering plant in the family Dipterocarpaceae. It is a tree native to Borneo, Peninsular Malaysia, Sumatra,, and Peninsular Thailand. It grows on hill slopes in submontane dipterocarp rain forest from 900 to 1,200 metres elevation.

The species was described by Colin Fraser Symington in 1941. The Latin specific epithet montana refers to mountains or coming from mountains.
