= Hopea bullatifolia =

Conservation status
- Near Threatened (IUCN 3.1)

Scientific classification
- Kingdom: Plantae
- Clade: Embryophytes
- Clade: Tracheophytes
- Clade: Angiosperms
- Clade: Eudicots
- Clade: Rosids
- Order: Malvales
- Family: Dipterocarpaceae
- Genus: Hopea
- Species: H. bullatifolia

Binomial name
- Hopea bullatifolia P.S.Ashton

Species of tree

Hopea bullatifolia is a tree in the family Dipterocarpaceae, native to Borneo. The specific epithet bullatifolia means 'blistered leaf'.

== Description ==
Hopea bullatifolia grows below the forest canopy, up to 20 metres (70 ft) tall, with a trunk diameter of up to 20 cm (8 in). It has buttresses. The bark is smooth. The leathery leaves are shaped oblong, with a quilted, blistery texture between the veins and measure up to 34 cm (13 in) long. The nuts are egg-shaped, measuring up to 1 cm (0.4 in) long.

== Distribution and habitat ==
Hopea bullatifolia is endemic to Borneo. Its habitat is lowland dipterocarp forest.

== Conservation ==
Hopea bullatifolia has been assessed as near threatened on the IUCN Red List. It is threatened by conversion of land for palm oil plantations. In Sarawak, the species is threatened by dam construction. In Kalimantan, it is threatened by logging for its timber. The species occurs mostly outside of protected areas.
