= Hopea erosa =

Conservation status
- Critically Endangered (IUCN 3.1)

Scientific classification
- Kingdom: Plantae
- Clade: Tracheophytes
- Clade: Angiosperms
- Clade: Eudicots
- Clade: Rosids
- Order: Malvales
- Family: Dipterocarpaceae
- Genus: Hopea
- Species: H. erosa

Binomial name
- Hopea erosa (Bedd.) Slooten

Synonyms
- Balanocarpus erosus Bedd.

Species of tree

Hopea erosa is a species of flowering plant in the family Dipterocarpaceae. It is a tree endemic to the southern Western Ghats in southwestern India. It grows in lowland semi-evergreen and evergreen tropical moist forests from 70 to 800 meters elevation.

The species was first described as Balanocarpus erosus by Richard Henry Beddome in 1874. In 1956 Richard Henry Beddome placed the species in genus Hopea as H. erosa.
