= Hopea treubii =

Conservation status
- Near Threatened (IUCN 3.1)

Scientific classification
- Kingdom: Plantae
- Clade: Embryophytes
- Clade: Tracheophytes
- Clade: Angiosperms
- Clade: Eudicots
- Clade: Rosids
- Order: Malvales
- Family: Dipterocarpaceae
- Genus: Hopea
- Species: H. treubii

Binomial name
- Hopea treubii F.Heim

Species of tree

Hopea treubii is a tree in the family Dipterocarpaceae, native to Borneo. It is named for the Dutch botanist Melchior Treub.

== Description ==
Hopea treubii grows as a forest canopy tree, up to 40 metres (130 ft) tall, with a trunk diameter of up to 80 cm (30 in). It has buttresses and flying (detached) buttresses. The bark is fissured. The leathery leaves are shaped obovate to elliptic and measure up to 8 cm (3 in) long. The inflorescences measure up to 8 cm (3 in) long and bear up to seven yellow flowers. The nuts are egg-shaped and measure up to 1.1 cm (0.4 in) long.

== Distribution and habitat ==
Hopea treubii is endemic to Borneo. Its habitat is mixed dipterocarp forests, to elevations of 400 m (1,300 ft).

== Conservation ==
Hopea treubii has been assessed as near threatened on the IUCN Red List. It is threatened by conversion of land for plantations, agriculture and logging roads. The species is also threatened by logging for its timber. The species is found in some protected areas.
