= Hopea vesquei =

Conservation status
- Least Concern (IUCN 3.1)

Scientific classification
- Kingdom: Plantae
- Clade: Embryophytes
- Clade: Tracheophytes
- Clade: Angiosperms
- Clade: Eudicots
- Clade: Rosids
- Order: Malvales
- Family: Dipterocarpaceae
- Genus: Hopea
- Species: H. vesquei

Binomial name
- Hopea vesquei F.Heim

Species of tree

Hopea vesquei is a tree in the family Dipterocarpaceae, native to Borneo. It is named for the French botanist Julien Joseph Vesque.

== Description ==
Hopea vesquei grows below the forest canopy, up to 30 metres (100 ft) tall, with a trunk diameter of up to 30 cm (12 in). It has buttresses up to 80 cm (30 in) tall and stilt roots. The bark is cracked in places. The leathery leaves are ovate and measure up to 6 cm (2.4 in) long. The inflorescences measure up to 3 cm (1 in) long and bear up to five cream yellowish flowers. The nuts are cylindrical and measure up to 1.5 cm (0.6 in) long.

== Distribution and habitat ==
Hopea vesquei is endemic to Borneo. Its habitat is in kerangas and lowland mixed dipterocarp forests, to elevations of 500 m (1,600 ft).
