= Hopea acuminata =

Conservation status
- Vulnerable (IUCN 3.1)

Scientific classification
- Kingdom: Plantae
- Clade: Tracheophytes
- Clade: Angiosperms
- Clade: Eudicots
- Clade: Rosids
- Order: Malvales
- Family: Dipterocarpaceae
- Genus: Hopea
- Species: H. acuminata

Binomial name
- Hopea acuminata Merr.

Species of tropical tree

Hopea acuminata is a species of plant in the family Dipterocarpaceae. It is endemic to the Philippines. Locally called manggachapui and also dalingdingan, it is a hard straight grained wood that was used to build the early Manila galleons; it having qualities of being so dense as to not be affected by wood boring insects and one supposes marine worms.
