= Hopea forbesii =

Conservation status
- Near Threatened (IUCN 3.1)

Scientific classification
- Kingdom: Plantae
- Clade: Tracheophytes
- Clade: Angiosperms
- Clade: Eudicots
- Clade: Rosids
- Order: Malvales
- Family: Dipterocarpaceae
- Genus: Hopea
- Species: H. forbesii

Binomial name
- Hopea forbesii (Brandis) Slooten

Synonyms
- Shorea forbesii Brandis

Species of flowering plant

Hopea forbesii is a species of flowering plant in the family Dipterocarpaceae. It is a tree endemic to eastern New Guinea (Papua New Guinea).

It is a large tree, growing up to 32 metres tall with a trunk up to 100 cm in diameter. It grows in the lowland evergreen rain forests of eastern New Guinea, up to 1000 metres elevation, where it is locally common. It is known from coastal forest in Milne Bay Province and its islands, and coastal and inland forests of Central Province, Morobe Province, and Western Province.

The species is threatened by logging for timber, and habitat loss from the expansion of subsistence farming. The IUCN Red List assesses the species as near threatened.

The species was first described as Shorea forbesii by Dietrich Brandis in 1894. In 1961 Dirk Fok van Slooten placed the species in genus Hopea as H. forbesii.
