= Hopea fluvialis =

Conservation status
- Near Threatened (IUCN 3.1)

Scientific classification
- Kingdom: Plantae
- Clade: Embryophytes
- Clade: Tracheophytes
- Clade: Angiosperms
- Clade: Eudicots
- Clade: Rosids
- Order: Malvales
- Family: Dipterocarpaceae
- Genus: Hopea
- Species: H. fluvialis

Binomial name
- Hopea fluvialis P.S.Ashton

Species of tree

Hopea fluvialis is a tree in the family Dipterocarpaceae, native to Borneo. The specific epithet fluvialis means "of rivers", referring to species' habitat.

== Description ==
Hopea fluvialis grows up to 25 metres (80 ft) tall, with a trunk diameter of up to 80 cm (30 in). It may also have buttresses and stilt roots. The bark is smooth. The leaves are lanceolate to ovate and measure up to 12 cm (5 in) long. The inflorescences measure up to 6 cm (2 in) long and bear up to seven cream flowers. The nuts are egg-shaped and measure up to 1.1 cm (0.4 in) long.

== Distribution and habitat ==
Hopea fluvialis is endemic to Borneo. Its habitat is lowland dipterocarp forests by rivers, to elevations of 970 m (3,000 ft).

== Conservation ==
Hopea fluvialis has been assessed as near threatened on the IUCN Red List. It is threatened by land conversion for tree plantations and agriculture and by logging for its timber. In Sarawak, fires are also a threat. The species is found in two protected areas in Sarawak.
