= Hopea aequalis =

Conservation status
- Endangered (IUCN 3.1)

Scientific classification
- Kingdom: Plantae
- Clade: Tracheophytes
- Clade: Angiosperms
- Clade: Eudicots
- Clade: Rosids
- Order: Malvales
- Family: Dipterocarpaceae
- Genus: Hopea
- Species: H. aequalis

Binomial name
- Hopea aequalis P.S.Ashton

Species of tropical tree

Hopea aequalis is a tree in the family Dipterocarpaceae, native to Borneo. The specific epithet aequalis means "equal" and refers to the lobes of the fruit's calyx.

== Description ==
Hopea aequalis grows below the forest canopy, up to 20 metres (70 ft) tall, with a trunk diameter of up to 20 cm (8 in). It has both attached and flying (detached) buttresses and also stilt roots. The bark is smooth. The papery leaves are shaped lanceolate to oblong and measure up to 25 cm (10 in) long. The nuts are egg-shaped and measure up to 2.3 cm (1 in) long.

== Distribution and habitat ==
Hopea aequalis is endemic to Borneo. Its habitat is mixed dipterocarp forests, to elevations of 100 m (300 ft).

== Conservation ==
Hopea aequalis has been assessed as endangered on the IUCN Red List. It is threatened mainly by conversion of land for agriculture. It is also threatened by illegal logging for its timber. The species is found in some protected areas.
