= Hopea sulcata =

Conservation status
- Near Threatened (IUCN 3.1)

Scientific classification
- Kingdom: Plantae
- Clade: Tracheophytes
- Clade: Angiosperms
- Clade: Eudicots
- Clade: Rosids
- Order: Malvales
- Family: Dipterocarpaceae
- Genus: Hopea
- Species: H. sulcata

Binomial name
- Hopea sulcata Symington

Species of tree

Hopea sulcata is a species of flowering plant in the family Dipterocarpaceae. It is a tree endemic to Peninsular Malaysia.
