= Hopea depressinerva =

Conservation status
- Critically Endangered (IUCN 3.1)

Scientific classification
- Kingdom: Plantae
- Clade: Embryophytes
- Clade: Tracheophytes
- Clade: Angiosperms
- Clade: Eudicots
- Clade: Rosids
- Order: Malvales
- Family: Dipterocarpaceae
- Genus: Hopea
- Species: H. depressinerva

Binomial name
- Hopea depressinerva P.S.Ashton

Species of tree

Hopea depressinerva is a tree in the family Dipterocarpaceae, native to Borneo. The specific epithet depressinerva means "sunken nerve", referring to the leaf veins.

== Description ==
Hopea depressinerva grows in or just below the forest canopy, up to 25 metres (80 ft) tall, with a trunk diameter of up to 50 cm (20 in). The bark may be cracked. The leathery leaves are lanceolate to elliptic and measure up to 13 cm (5 in) long. The inflorescences measure up to 7 cm (3 in) long and bear up to five pink flowers.

== Distribution and habitat ==
Hopea depressinerva is endemic to Borneo, where it is confined to Sarawak. Its habitat is mixed dipterocarp forests, at elevations of 50–700 m (200–2,300 ft).

== Conservation ==
Hopea depressinerva has been assessed as critically endangered on the IUCN Red List. It is threatened by land conversion for palm oil plantations and by small-scale agriculture. The species is not present in any protected areas.
