= Hopea semicuneata =

Conservation status
- Endangered (IUCN 3.1)

Scientific classification
- Kingdom: Plantae
- Clade: Embryophytes
- Clade: Tracheophytes
- Clade: Angiosperms
- Clade: Eudicots
- Clade: Rosids
- Order: Malvales
- Family: Dipterocarpaceae
- Genus: Hopea
- Species: H. semicuneata

Binomial name
- Hopea semicuneata Symington

Synonyms
- Hopea diversifolia Miq.

Species of tree

Hopea semicuneata is a tree in the family Dipterocarpaceae. The specific epithet semicuneata means "half wedge-shaped", referring to the leaf base.

== Description ==
Hopea semicuneata grows up to 50 metres (160 ft) tall, with a trunk diameter of up to 2 m (7 ft). It has buttresses measuring up to 7 m (23 ft) tall. The bark is cracked and flaked. The papery leaves are elliptic or ovate to lanceolate and measure up to 14 cm (6 in) long. The inflorescences measure up to 7 cm (3 in) long and bear cream flowers. The roundish nuts measure up to 0.6 cm (0.2 in) in diameter.

== Distribution and habitat ==
Hopea semicuneata is native to Peninsular Malaysia, Borneo and Mursala Island, off Sumatra. In Peninsular Malaysia, its habitat is hill and coastal forests, to elevations of 400 m (1,300 ft). In Borneo its habitat is in mixed dipterocarp forests and by rivers, to elevations of 620 m (2,000 ft).

== Conservation ==
Hopea semicuneata has been assessed as endangered on the IUCN Red List. It is threatened by land conversion for agricultural plantations. It is also threatened by logging and the addition of logging roads. The species is found in some protected areas.
