= Hopea scabra =

Conservation status
- Critically Endangered (IUCN 3.1)

Scientific classification
- Kingdom: Plantae
- Clade: Tracheophytes
- Clade: Angiosperms
- Clade: Eudicots
- Clade: Rosids
- Order: Malvales
- Family: Dipterocarpaceae
- Genus: Hopea
- Species: H. scabra

Binomial name
- Hopea scabra P.S.Ashton

Species of tree

Hopea scabra is a species of flowering plant in the family Dipterocarpaceae. It is a tree endemic to Papua New Guinea. It is a medium-sized tree which grows up to 20 metres tall. It is known only from Sudest Island in the Louisiade Archipelago of Milne Bay Province. It grows in lowland coastal rain forest near rivers at about 30 metres elevation.

The species was first described by Peter Shaw Ashton in 1978.
