= Hopea enicosanthoides =

Conservation status
- Endangered (IUCN 3.1)

Scientific classification
- Kingdom: Plantae
- Clade: Embryophytes
- Clade: Tracheophytes
- Clade: Angiosperms
- Clade: Eudicots
- Clade: Rosids
- Order: Malvales
- Family: Dipterocarpaceae
- Genus: Hopea
- Species: H. enicosanthoides

Binomial name
- Hopea enicosanthoides P.S.Ashton

Species of tree

Hopea enicosanthoides is a tree in the family Dipterocarpaceae, native to Borneo. The specific epithet enicosanthoides refers to the leaves' resemblance to those of the genus Enicosanthum (now Monoon).

== Description ==
Hopea enicosanthoides grows up to 18 metres (60 ft) tall, with a trunk diameter of up to 20 cm (8 in). It has thin, low buttresses and stilt roots. The bark is smooth. The very large, leathery leaves are oblong and measure up to 46 cm (18 in) long. The nuts are egg-shaped and measure up to 1 cm (0.4 in) long.

== Distribution and habitat ==
Hopea enicosanthoides is endemic to Borneo, where it is confined to Sarawak. Its habitat is mixed dipterocarp forests by rivers, at elevations to 100 m (300 ft).

== Conservation ==
Hopea enicosanthoides has been assessed as endangered on the IUCN Red List. It is threatened by land conversion for palm oil plantations, logging and urban development. The species does not occur in protected areas.
