= Hopea brachyptera =

Conservation status
- Critically Endangered (IUCN 3.1)

Scientific classification
- Kingdom: Plantae
- Clade: Tracheophytes
- Clade: Angiosperms
- Clade: Eudicots
- Clade: Rosids
- Order: Malvales
- Family: Dipterocarpaceae
- Genus: Hopea
- Species: H. brachyptera

Binomial name
- Hopea brachyptera (Foxw.) Slooten

Synonyms
- Balanocarpus brachypterus Foxw.

Species of tree

Hopea brachyptera is a species of flowering plant in the family Dipterocarpaceae. It is a tree endemic to the Philippines, where it is commonly known as Mindanao narek. It is a medium-sized tree which typically flowers in April. It grows in lowland rain forest below 500 meters elevation.

The species was first described as Balanocarpus brachypterus by Frederick William Foxworthy in 1918. In 1956 Dirk Fok van Slooten placed the species in genus Hopea as H. brachyptera.
