= Hopea latifolia =

Conservation status
- Data Deficient (IUCN 3.1)

Scientific classification
- Kingdom: Plantae
- Clade: Embryophytes
- Clade: Tracheophytes
- Clade: Angiosperms
- Clade: Eudicots
- Clade: Rosids
- Order: Malvales
- Family: Dipterocarpaceae
- Genus: Hopea
- Species: H. latifolia

Binomial name
- Hopea latifolia Symington

Species of tree

Hopea latifolia is a tree in the family Dipterocarpaceae. The specific epithet latifolia means "wide leaf".

== Description ==
Hopea latifolia grows as a canopy tree, up to 40 metres (130 ft) tall, with a trunk diameter of up to 70 cm (28 in). It has buttresses and stilt roots. The bark is smooth. The leathery leaves are ovate and measure up to 8 cm (3 in) long. The inflorescences measure up to 4 cm (2 in) long and bear up to five cream flowers. The nuts are egg-shaped and measure up to 0.8 cm (0.3 in) long.

== Distribution and habitat ==
Hopea latifolia is native to Peninsular Malaysia and Borneo. Its habitat is mixed dipterocarp forests, to elevations of 400 m (1,300 ft).
