= Hopea auriculata =

Conservation status
- Critically Endangered (IUCN 3.1)

Scientific classification
- Kingdom: Plantae
- Clade: Tracheophytes
- Clade: Angiosperms
- Clade: Eudicots
- Clade: Rosids
- Order: Malvales
- Family: Dipterocarpaceae
- Genus: Hopea
- Species: H. auriculata

Binomial name
- Hopea auriculata Foxw.

Species of tropical tree

Hopea auriculata is a species of plant in the family Dipterocarpaceae. It is a tree endemic to Peninsular Malaysia.

The species was first described by Frederick William Foxworthy in 1932.
