= Hopea oblongifolia =

Conservation status
- Vulnerable (IUCN 3.1)

Scientific classification
- Kingdom: Plantae
- Clade: Tracheophytes
- Clade: Angiosperms
- Clade: Eudicots
- Clade: Rosids
- Order: Malvales
- Family: Dipterocarpaceae
- Genus: Hopea
- Species: H. oblongifolia

Binomial name
- Hopea oblongifolia Dyer

Synonyms
- Hopea oblongifolia var. grandis C.E.C.Fisch.; Richetia oblongifolia (Dyer) F.Heim

Species of tree

Hopea oblongifolia is a species of flowering plant in the family Dipterocarpaceae. It a tree native to northeastern India, Myanmar, and Peninsular Thailand. It is a small tree which grows in lowland tropical moist forest.

The species was described by William Turner Thiselton-Dyer in 1874.
