= Hopea dyeri =

Conservation status
- Near Threatened (IUCN 3.1)

Scientific classification
- Kingdom: Plantae
- Clade: Embryophytes
- Clade: Tracheophytes
- Clade: Angiosperms
- Clade: Eudicots
- Clade: Rosids
- Order: Malvales
- Family: Dipterocarpaceae
- Genus: Hopea
- Species: H. dyeri

Binomial name
- Hopea dyeri F.Heim

Synonyms
- Hancea microptera (Dyer ex Brandis) Pierre; Hopea microptera Dyer ex Brandis

Species of tree

Hopea dyeri is a tree in the family Dipterocarpaceae. It is named for the British botanist William Turner Thiselton-Dyer.

== Description ==
Hopea dyeri grows as a canopy tree, up to 40 metres (130 ft) tall, with a trunk diameter of up to 65 cm (26 in). It has buttresses and stilt roots. The smooth bark may become flaky in patches. The leathery leaves are lanceolate to ovate and measure up to 7 cm (3 in) long. The inflorescences measure up to 3 cm (1 in) and bear up to four cream flowers. The nuts are egg-shaped, measuring up to 0.9 cm (0.4 in) long.

== Distribution and habitat ==
Hopea dyeri is native to Peninsular Malaysia and Borneo. Its habitat is mixed dipterocarp forest, on hills and ridges, generally lowland but sometimes to elevations of 1,000 m (3,300 ft).
