= Hopea bracteata =

Conservation status
- Least Concern (IUCN 3.1)

Scientific classification
- Kingdom: Plantae
- Clade: Embryophytes
- Clade: Tracheophytes
- Clade: Angiosperms
- Clade: Eudicots
- Clade: Rosids
- Order: Malvales
- Family: Dipterocarpaceae
- Genus: Hopea
- Species: H. bracteata

Binomial name
- Hopea bracteata Burck

Synonyms
- Balanocarpus bracteatus (Burck) Merr.; Balanocarpus curtisii King; Hopea minima Symington

Species of tree

Hopea bracteata is a tree in the family Dipterocarpaceae. It is native to Borneo, Peninsular Thailand, Peninsular Malaysia, and Sumatra.

The species was described by William Burck in 1887. The specific epithet bracteata means 'thin metal plate', referring to the bracts (leaf-like structures) of the inflorescence.

== Description ==
Hopea bracteata grows below the forest canopy, up to 40 metres (130 ft) tall, with a trunk diameter of up to 60 cm (24 in). It has flying (detached) buttress roots. The bark is smooth. The papery leaves are elliptic to ovate and measure up to 6 cm (2 in) long. The inflorescences measure up to 9 cm (4 in) with almost persistent bracts. The flowers have deep red petals.

== Distribution and habitat ==
Hopea bracteata is native to Thailand, Peninsular Malaysia, Singapore, Sumatra and Borneo. Its habitat is mixed dipterocarp forest, to elevations of 600 m (2,000 ft).
