= Hopea basilanica =

Conservation status
- Critically Endangered (IUCN 3.1)

Scientific classification
- Kingdom: Plantae
- Clade: Tracheophytes
- Clade: Angiosperms
- Clade: Eudicots
- Clade: Rosids
- Order: Malvales
- Family: Dipterocarpaceae
- Genus: Hopea
- Species: H. basilanica

Binomial name
- Hopea basilanica Foxw.

Species of tropical tree

Hopea basilanica is a species of flowering plant in the family Dipterocarpaceae. It is a tree endemic to the Philippines. It is a large tree, which typically flowers in May and June and fruits in August. It is native to the islands of Mindanao, Basilan, and Sibutu, where it grows in primary lowland rain forest below 70 meters elevation.

The species was first described by Frederick William Foxworthy in 1911.
