= Hopea chinensis =

Conservation status
- Endangered (IUCN 3.1)

Scientific classification
- Kingdom: Plantae
- Clade: Tracheophytes
- Clade: Angiosperms
- Clade: Eudicots
- Clade: Rosids
- Order: Malvales
- Family: Dipterocarpaceae
- Genus: Hopea
- Species: H. chinensis

Binomial name
- Hopea chinensis (Merr.) Hand.-Mazz.

Synonyms
- List: Hopea austroyunnanica Y.K. Yang & J.K. Wu; Hopea boreovietnamica Y.K. Yang & J.K. Wu; Hopea daweishanica Y.K. Yang & J.K. Wu; Hopea guangxiensis Y.K. Yang & J.K. Wu; Hopea hongayensis Tardieu; Hopea jianshu Y.K.Yang S.Z.Yang & D.M.Wang; Hopea mollissima C.Y.Wu; Hopea pingbianica Y.K. Yang & J.K. Wu; Hopea yunnanensis Y.K. Yang & J.K. Wu; Shorea chinensis Merr.

Species of tree

Hopea chinensis is a species of medium-sized tree (15–20 metres (49–66 ft) tall) in the family Dipterocarpaceae. It is found in southern China (S and SW Guangxi and S and SE Yunnan) and northern Vietnam. It grows in tropical and subtropical lowland and montane moist evergreen forests.

Hopea chinensis is an endangered species threatened by exploitation of its durable timber. In China it is under first-class national protection. It also produces hopeachinols C and D.
