= Hopea celtidifolia =

Conservation status
- Vulnerable (IUCN 3.1)

Scientific classification
- Kingdom: Plantae
- Clade: Tracheophytes
- Clade: Angiosperms
- Clade: Eudicots
- Clade: Rosids
- Order: Malvales
- Family: Dipterocarpaceae
- Genus: Hopea
- Species: H. celtidifolia

Binomial name
- Hopea celtidifolia Kosterm.

Synonyms
- Hopea celtidifolia Kosterm. ex P.S.Ashton, nom. illeg. homonym. post.

Species of flowering plant

Hopea celtidifolia is a species of flowering plant in the family Dipterocarpaceae. It is a tree endemic to New Guinea. It is a medium-sized tree native to lowland rain forest. It is known from six locations in Western New Guinea and Papua New Guinea, mostly near the border between the two. It is known from six locations, and was previously known from ten. The species' present extent of occurrence (EOO) is estimated at 6,877.500 km^{2} and its area of occupancy (AOO) is 24 km^{2}. The species is threatened by habitat loss from timber harvesting and forest clearance for agriculture, roads, and settlements. Its estimated EOO has declined by over 30% and its AOO by 50%, with an estimated population decline of 40%. The IUCN assesses the species as vulnerable.

The species was first described by André Joseph Guillaume Henri Kostermans in 1968.
