= Hopea parvifolia =

Conservation status
- Endangered (IUCN 3.1)

Scientific classification
- Kingdom: Plantae
- Clade: Tracheophytes
- Clade: Angiosperms
- Clade: Eudicots
- Clade: Rosids
- Order: Malvales
- Family: Dipterocarpaceae
- Genus: Hopea
- Species: H. parvifolia

Binomial name
- Hopea parvifolia (Warb.) Slooten

Synonyms
- Anisoptera parvifolia Warb.

Species of flowering plant

Hopea parvifolia is a species of flowering plant in the family Dipterocarpaceae. It is a tree endemic to New Guinea. It is native to Central, Morobe, and Milne Bay provinces of Papua New Guinea, where it grows in lowland rain forests, typically near rivers and below 200 meters elevation.

The species was first described as Anisoptera parvifolia by Otto Warburg in 1891. In 1952 Dirk Fok van Slooten placed the species in genus Hopea as H. parvifolia.
