= Hopea pentanervia =

Conservation status
- Vulnerable (IUCN 3.1)

Scientific classification
- Kingdom: Plantae
- Clade: Embryophytes
- Clade: Tracheophytes
- Clade: Angiosperms
- Clade: Eudicots
- Clade: Rosids
- Order: Malvales
- Family: Dipterocarpaceae
- Genus: Hopea
- Species: H. pentanervia

Binomial name
- Hopea pentanervia Symington ex G.H.S.Wood

Species of tree

Hopea pentanervia is a tree in the family Dipterocarpaceae, native to Borneo. The specific epithet pentanervia means "five-nerved", referring to the species' five pairs of leaf veins.

== Description ==
Hopea pentanervia grows as a canopy tree, up to 35 metres (110 ft) tall, with a trunk diameter of up to 1 m (3 ft). It has buttresses up to 1 m (3 ft) tall. The bark is cracked and flaked. The leathery leaves are ovate and measure up to 10 cm (4 in) long. The inflorescences measure up to 8 cm (3 in) long and bear cream flowers. The nuts are egg-shaped and measure up to 0.4 cm (0.2 in) long.

== Distribution and habitat ==
Hopea pentanervia is endemic to Borneo. Its habitat is peat swamp forest and kerangas forest, to elevations of 400 m (1,300 ft).

== Conservation ==
Hopea pentanervia has been assessed as vulnerable on the IUCN Red List. It is threatened by land conversion for palm oil plantations and for other agriculture and industry. It is also threatened by logging for its timber. The species is found in some protected areas.
