= Hopea micrantha =

Conservation status
- Critically Endangered (IUCN 3.1)

Scientific classification
- Kingdom: Plantae
- Clade: Embryophytes
- Clade: Tracheophytes
- Clade: Angiosperms
- Clade: Eudicots
- Clade: Rosids
- Order: Malvales
- Family: Dipterocarpaceae
- Genus: Hopea
- Species: H. micrantha

Binomial name
- Hopea micrantha Hook.f.

Synonyms
- Hancea micrantha (Hook.f.) Pierre

Species of tree

Hopea micrantha is a tree in the family Dipterocarpaceae. The specific epithet micrantha means "small flower".

== Description ==
Hopea micrantha grows as a canopy tree, up to 30 metres (100 ft) tall, with a trunk diameter of up to 30 cm (12 in). It has buttresses and stilt roots. The bark is smooth. The leathery leaves are lanceolate to oblong and measure up to 8 cm (3 in) long. The inflorescences measure up to 1 cm (0.4 in) long and bear up to five pink flowers. The nuts are egg-shaped and measure up to 1 cm (0.4 in) long.

== Distribution and habitat ==
Hopea micrantha is native to Borneo. The species was present in Sumatra, but its presence there is now uncertain. Its habitat is heath forests, to elevations of 100 m (300 ft).

== Conservation ==
Hopea micrantha has been assessed as critically endangered on the IUCN Red List. It is threatened by land conversion for tree and palm oil plantations and by logging for its timber. The species is found in some protected areas.
