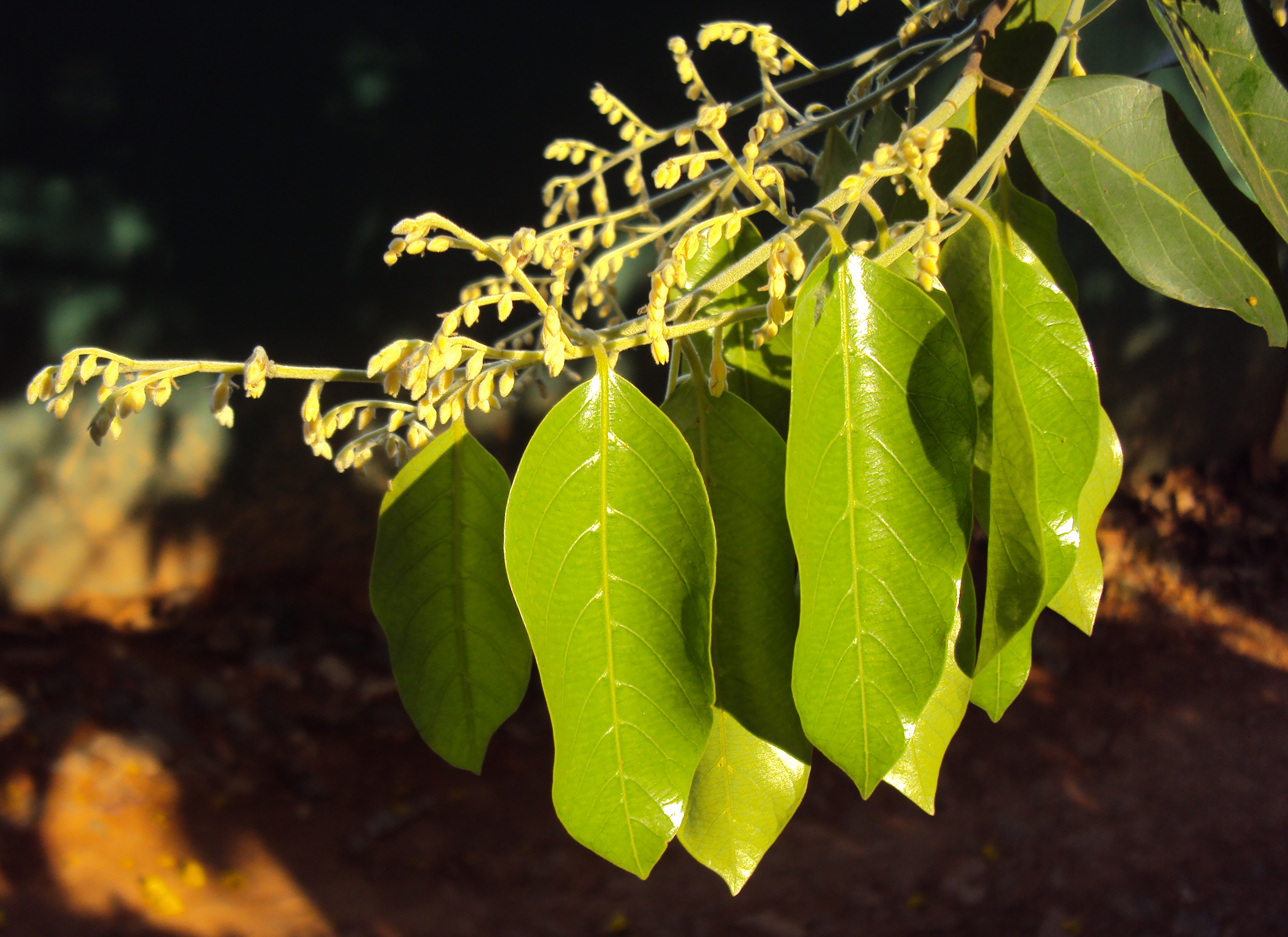
- Hopea parviflora

Scientific classification
- Kingdom: Plantae
- Clade: Embryophytes
- Clade: Tracheophytes
- Clade: Angiosperms
- Clade: Eudicots
- Clade: Rosids
- Order: Malvales
- Family: Dipterocarpaceae
- Tribe: Shoreae
- Genus: Hopea; Roxb., nom. cons.

Species
- 114, see text

Synonyms
- Balanocarpus Beddome; Dioticarpus Dunn; Hancea Pierre; Neisandra Raf.; Petalandra Hasskarl; Peirrea F.Heim; Pierreocarpus Ridl. ex Symington

= Hopea =

Genus of tropical trees

Hopea is a genus of plants in the family Dipterocarpaceae. It contains some 114 species, distributed from Sri Lanka and southern India to the Andaman Islands, Myanmar, southern China, and southward throughout Malesia to New Guinea. They are mainly main and subcanopy trees of lowland rainforest, but some species can become also emergent trees, such as Hopea nutans.

The genus was named after John Hope, the first Regius Keeper of the Royal Botanic Garden, Edinburgh.

== Botany ==
Trees in this genus are small or medium, but they can grow occasionally large. They have low branches and sometimes thick buttress roots. Their bark is chocolate brown and smooth at first, but later crack and mottle with grey spots.

== Species ==
As of August 2026 the following species are accepted:

1. Hopea acuminata Merr.
2. Hopea aequalis P.S.Ashton
3. Hopea altocollina P.S.Ashton
4. Hopea andersonii P.S.Ashton
5. Hopea apiculata Symington
6. Hopea aptera P.S.Ashton
7. Hopea auriculata Foxw.
8. Hopea bancana (Boerl.) Slooten
9. Hopea basilanica Foxw.
10. Hopea beccariana Burck
11. Hopea bilitonensis P.S.Ashton
12. Hopea brachyptera (Foxw.) Slooten
13. Hopea bracteata Burck
14. Hopea brevipetiolaris (Thwaites ex Trimen) P.S.Ashton
15. Hopea bullatifolia P.S.Ashton
16. Hopea cagayanensis (Foxw.) Slooten
17. Hopea canarensis Hole
18. Hopea celebica Burck
19. Hopea celtidifolia Kosterm.
20. Hopea centipeda P.S.Ashton
21. Hopea cernua Teijsm. & Binn.
22. Hopea chinensis (Merr.) Hand.-Mazz.
23. Hopea cordata J.E.Vidal
24. Hopea cordifolia (Thwaites) Trimen
25. Hopea coriacea Burck
26. Hopea dasyrrhachis Slooten
27. Hopea depressinerva P.S.Ashton
28. Hopea discolor Thwaites
29. Hopea dryobalanoides Miq.
30. Hopea dyeri F.Heim
31. Hopea enicosanthoides P.S.Ashton
32. Hopea erosa (Bedd.) Slooten
33. Hopea ferrea Laness.
34. Hopea ferruginea Parijs
35. Hopea fluvialis P.S.Ashton
36. Hopea forbesii (Brandis) Slooten
37. Hopea foxworthyi Elmer
38. Hopea glabra Wight & Arn.
39. Hopea glabrifolia C.T.White
40. Hopea glaucescens Symington
41. Hopea gregaria Slooten
42. Hopea griffithii Kurz
43. Hopea hainanensis Merr. & Chun
44. Hopea helferi (Dyer) Brandis
45. Hopea indica (Raf.) R.Kr.Singh
46. Hopea inexpectata P.S.Ashton
47. Hopea iriana Slooten
48. Hopea jacobi C.E.C.Fisch.
49. Hopea johorensis Symington
50. Hopea jucunda Thwaites
51. Hopea kerangasensis P.S.Ashton
52. Hopea latifolia Symington
53. Hopea longifolia Dyer
54. Hopea longirostrata P.S.Ashton
55. Hopea macrocarpa Poopath & Sookch.
56. Hopea malibato Foxw.
57. Hopea megacarpa P.S.Ashton
58. Hopea mengarawan Miq.
59. Hopea mesuoides P.S.Ashton
60. Hopea micrantha Hook.f.
61. Hopea mindanensis Foxw.
62. Hopea modesta (A.DC.) Kosterm.
63. Hopea montana Symington
64. Hopea myrtifolia Miq.
65. Hopea nervosa King
66. Hopea nigra Burck
67. Hopea nodosa Slooten
68. Hopea novoguineensis Slooten
69. Hopea nutans Ridl.
70. Hopea oblongifolia Dyer
71. Hopea obscurinerva P.S.Ashton
72. Hopea odorata Roxb.
73. Hopea ovoidea P.S.Ashton
74. Hopea pachycarpa (F.Heim) Symington
75. Hopea papuana Diels
76. Hopea parviflora Bedd.
77. Hopea parvifolia (Warb.) Slooten
78. Hopea paucinervis Parijs
79. Hopea pedicellata (Brandis) Symington
80. Hopea pentanervia Symington ex G.H.S.Wood
81. Hopea philippinensis Dyer
82. Hopea pierrei Hance
83. Hopea plagata (Blanco) S.Vidal
84. Hopea polyalthioides Symington
85. Hopea ponga (Dennst.) Mabb.
86. Hopea pterygota P.S.Ashton
87. Hopea pubescens Ridl.
88. Hopea quisumbingiana H.G.Gut.
89. Hopea racophloea Dyer
90. Hopea recopei Pierre ex Laness.
91. Hopea reticulata Tardieu
92. Hopea reynosoi H.G.Gut., Rojo & Madulid
93. Hopea rudiformis P.S.Ashton
94. Hopea rugifolia P.S.Ashton
95. Hopea samarensis H.G.Gut.
96. Hopea sangal Korth.
97. Hopea santosiana H.G.Gut., Rojo & Madulid
98. Hopea sasidharanii Robi & Sujanapal
99. Hopea scabra P.S.Ashton
100. Hopea semicuneata Symington
101. †Hopea shingkeng (Dunn) Bor
102. Hopea similis Slooten
103. Hopea sphaerocarpa (F.Heim) P.S.Ashton
104. Hopea subalata Symington
105. Hopea sublanceolata Symington
106. Hopea subpeltata Poopath & Pooma
107. Hopea sulcata Symington
108. Hopea tenuinervula P.S.Ashton
109. Hopea thorelii Pierre
110. Hopea treubii F.Heim
111. Hopea ultima P.S.Ashton
112. Hopea vacciniifolia Ridl. ex P.S.Ashton
113. Hopea vesquei F.Heim
114. Hopea vietnamensis H.V.Sam & V.D.Vu
115. Hopea wyattsmithii G.H.S.Wood ex P.S.Ashton

Other species recently used, but now not accepted include:

- Hopea exalata, now a synonym of Hopea reticulata
- Hopea kitulgallensis, not now accepted
- Hopea malabarica, now a synonym of Hopea racophloea
- Hopea siamensis, now a synonym of Hopea pierrei
- Hopea utilis (Bedd.) Bole, synonym of Hopea longifolia Dyer
- Hopea wightiana Miq. ex Dyer, synonym of Hopea odorata Roxb.
- Hopea wightiana Wall. ex Wight & Arn., now a synonym of Hopea ponga var. ponga

== Gallery ==
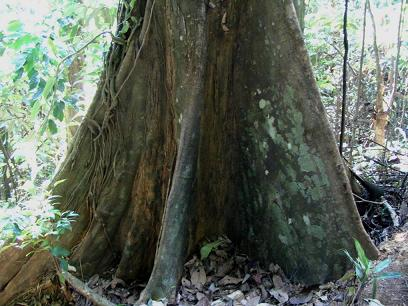
Hopea beccariana

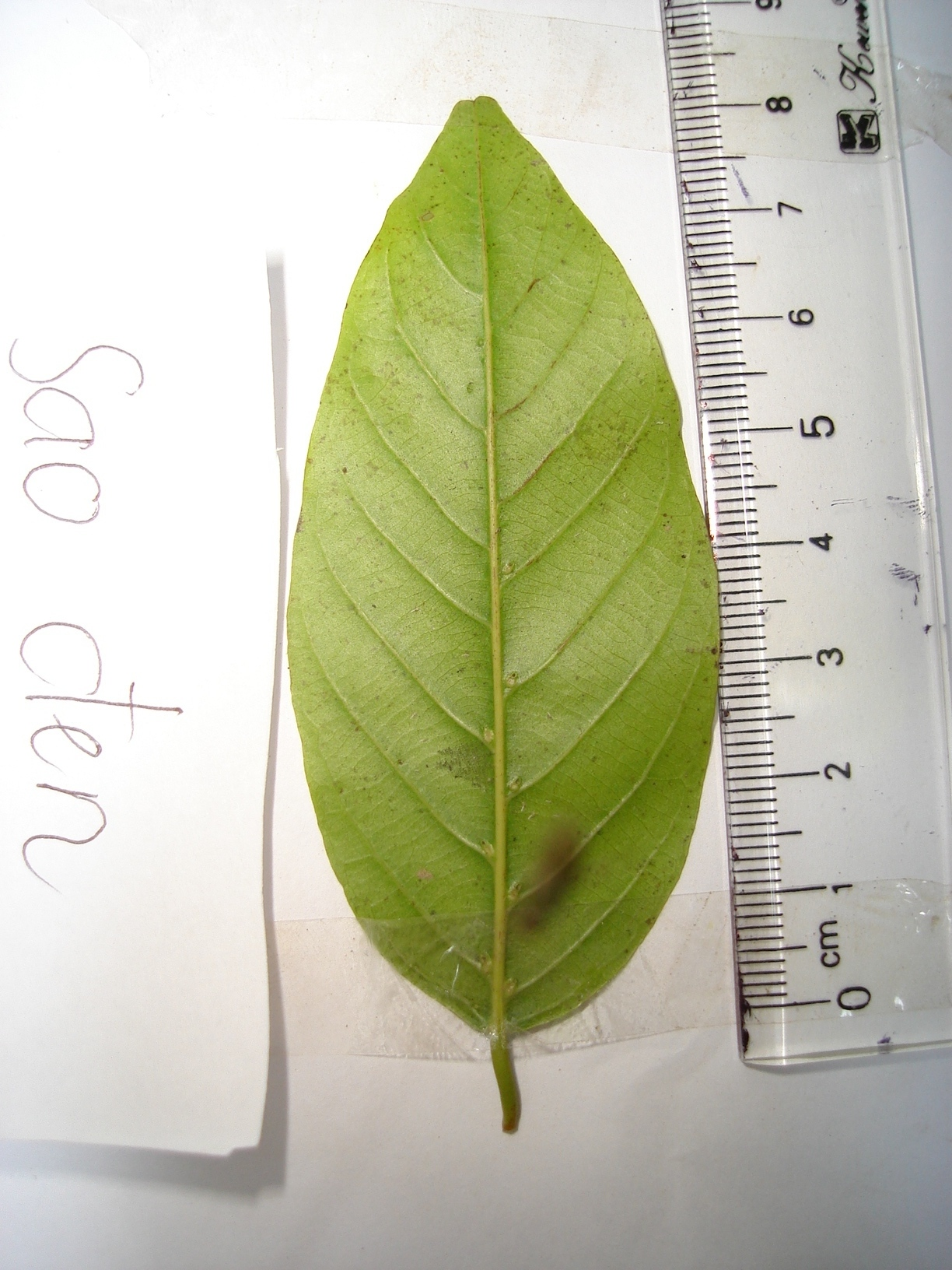
Hopea odorata
