= Hopea nodosa =

Conservation status
- Least Concern (IUCN 3.1)

Scientific classification
- Kingdom: Plantae
- Clade: Embryophytes
- Clade: Tracheophytes
- Clade: Angiosperms
- Clade: Eudicots
- Clade: Rosids
- Order: Malvales
- Family: Dipterocarpaceae
- Genus: Hopea
- Species: H. nodosa

Binomial name
- Hopea nodosa Slooten

Species of flowering plant

Hopea nodosa is a species of flowering plant in the family Dipterocarpaceae. It is a tree endemic to New Guinea. It is native to the Vogelkop Peninsula and Num Island in Western New Guinea, where it grows in primary and secondary lowland rain forest.

The species was first described by Dirk Fok van Slooten in 1953.
