= Hopea santosiana =

Conservation status
- Critically Endangered (IUCN 3.1)

Scientific classification
- Kingdom: Plantae
- Clade: Embryophytes
- Clade: Tracheophytes
- Clade: Angiosperms
- Clade: Eudicots
- Clade: Rosids
- Order: Malvales
- Family: Dipterocarpaceae
- Genus: Hopea
- Species: H. santosiana

Binomial name
- Hopea santosiana H.G.Gut., Rojo & Madulid

Species of flowering plant

Hopea santosiana is a species of flowering plant in the family Dipterocarpaceae. It is a tree endemic to the Philippines. It is a small tree, up to 10 meters (33 ft) tall, which is known from a single location in Balangiga, Eastern Samar, where it grows in riverside lowland rain forest. The IUCN Red List assesses the species as critically endangered.

The species was first described by Hermes G. Gutiérrez, Justo P. Rojo, and Domingo A. Madulid in 2010.
