= Hopea cordifolia =

Conservation status
- Endangered (IUCN 3.1)

Scientific classification
- Kingdom: Plantae
- Clade: Tracheophytes
- Clade: Angiosperms
- Clade: Eudicots
- Clade: Rosids
- Order: Malvales
- Family: Dipterocarpaceae
- Genus: Hopea
- Species: H. cordifolia

Binomial name
- Hopea cordifolia (Thwaites) Trimen

Synonyms
- Isauxis cordifolia (Thwaites) Hook.f.; Vatica cordifolia Thwaites

Species of tree

Hopea cordifolia is a species of flowering plant in the family Dipterocarpaceae. It is a tree endemic to Sri Lanka. It is native to the Walawe and Kirindi river basins in southwestern Sri Lanka, where it grows in riparian lowland rain forest.

Its wood is dark yellowish brown, very hard and heavy. It is capable of standing up to great transverse strains. It is durable and takes polish very well. Its density is 64 to 76 pounds per cubic foot (1.03 to 1.22 kg/dm^{3}).

The species was first described as Vatica cordifolia by George Henry Kendrick Thwaites in 1864. In 1893 Henry Trimen placed the species in genus Hopea as H. cordifolia.
