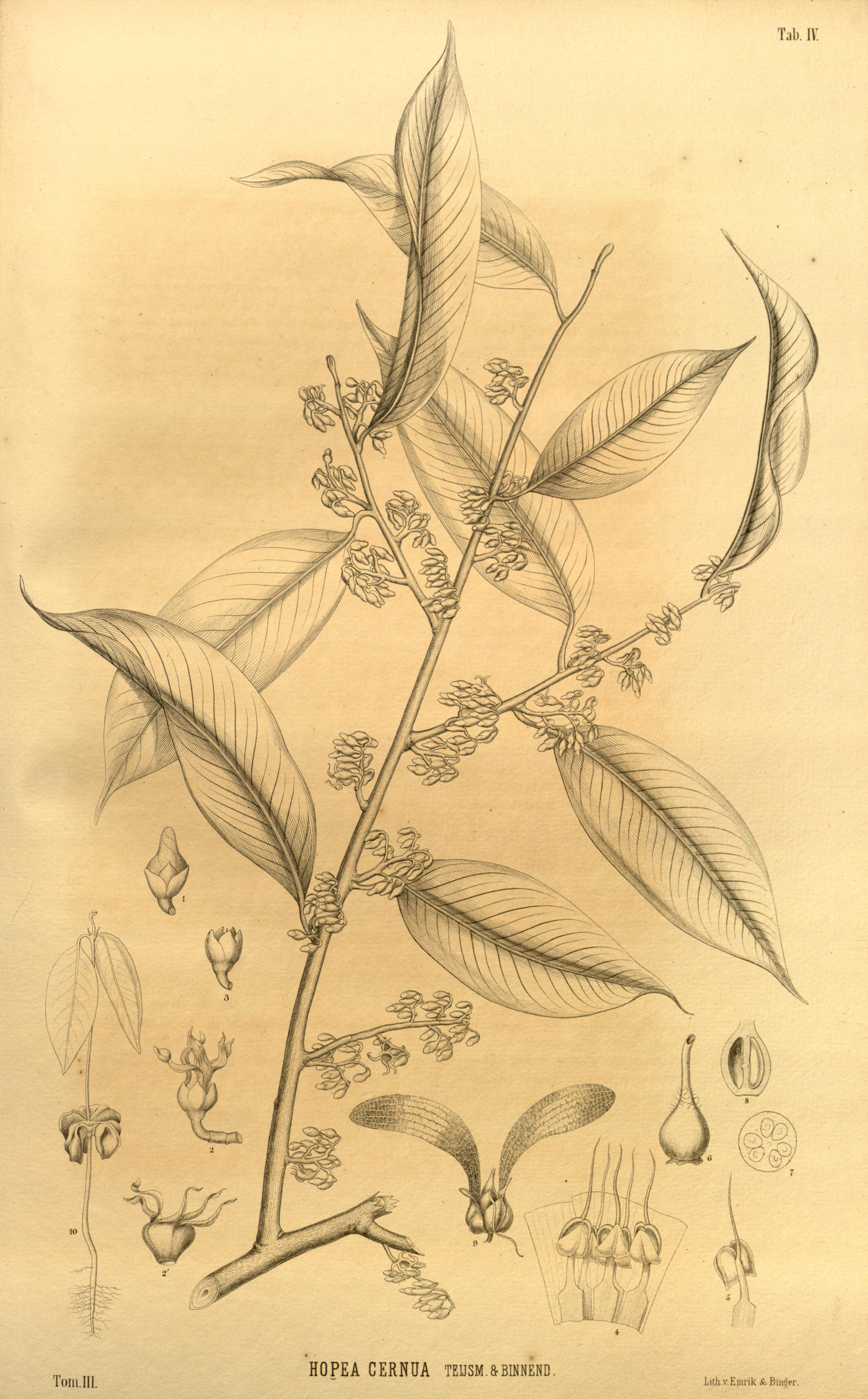
- Botanical drawing, 1867

Conservation status
- Endangered (IUCN 3.1)

Scientific classification
- Kingdom: Plantae
- Clade: Tracheophytes
- Clade: Angiosperms
- Clade: Eudicots
- Clade: Rosids
- Order: Malvales
- Family: Dipterocarpaceae
- Genus: Hopea
- Species: H. cernua

Binomial name
- Hopea cernua Teijsm. & Binn.

Synonyms
- Hancea cernua (Teijsm. & Binn.) Pierre; Hopea argentea Meijer; Hopea microcarpa F.Heim

= Hopea cernua =

Species of flowering plant

Hopea cernua is a tree in the family Dipterocarpaceae. It is native to Southeast Asia.

== Description ==
Hopea cernua grows as a canopy tree, up to 40 metres (130 ft) tall, with a trunk diameter of up to 80 cm (30 in). It has flying (detached) buttress roots. The bark becomes cracked and later fissured. The leathery leaves are elliptic to ovate and measure up to 15 cm (6 in) long. The inflorescences measure up to 3 cm (1 in) and bear cream flowers.

== Taxonomy ==
Hopea cernua was described by Dutch botanists Johannes Elias Teijsmann and Simon Binnendijk in Natuurkundig Tijdschrift voor Nederlandsch-Indië in 1867. The lectotype was collected on Sumatra. The specific epithet cernua means 'slightly drooping', referring to the flowers.

== Distribution and habitat ==
Hopea cernua is native to Sumatra and Borneo. Its habitat is mixed dipterocarp forest, to elevations of 1,650 m (5,400 ft).

== Conservation ==
Hopea cernua has been assessed as endangered on the IUCN Red List. It is threatened by conversion of land for agricultural plantations. It is also threatened by logging for its timber. The species occurs in some protected areas.
