= Hopea glabrifolia =

Conservation status
- Near Threatened (IUCN 3.1)

Scientific classification
- Kingdom: Plantae
- Clade: Tracheophytes
- Clade: Angiosperms
- Clade: Eudicots
- Clade: Rosids
- Order: Malvales
- Family: Dipterocarpaceae
- Genus: Hopea
- Species: H. glabrifolia

Binomial name
- Hopea glabrifolia C.T.White

Species of tree

Hopea glabrifolia is a species of flowering plant in the family Dipterocarpaceae. It is a tall tree endemic to eastern Papua New Guinea, where it grows in lowland rainforest on Misima and Rossel islands in the Louisiade Archipelago and on the Papuan Peninsula of mainland New Guinea.
