= Hopea jacobi =

Conservation status
- Critically Endangered (IUCN 3.1)

Scientific classification
- Kingdom: Plantae
- Clade: Tracheophytes
- Clade: Angiosperms
- Clade: Eudicots
- Clade: Rosids
- Order: Malvales
- Family: Dipterocarpaceae
- Genus: Hopea
- Species: H. jacobi

Binomial name
- Hopea jacobi C.E.C.Fisch.

Species of plant

Hopea jacobi is a critically endangered species of flowering plant in the family Dipterocarpaceae. It is a tree endemic to the Western Ghats of Kodagu district in Karnataka, southwestern India. It is known from a single collection made in 1925, in moist evergreen rain forest at 1000 metres elevation.

The species was first described by Cecil Ernest Claude Fischer in 1932.
