= Hopea racophloea =

Conservation status
- Endangered (IUCN 3.1)

Scientific classification
- Kingdom: Plantae
- Clade: Tracheophytes
- Clade: Angiosperms
- Clade: Eudicots
- Clade: Rosids
- Order: Malvales
- Family: Dipterocarpaceae
- Genus: Hopea
- Species: H. racophloea

Binomial name
- Hopea racophloea Dyer

Synonyms
- Hopea malabarica Bedd.

Species of tree

Hopea racophloea is a species of flowering plant in the family Dipterocarpaceae. It is a tree native to Kerala and Karnataka states in southwestern India. It grows in evergreen moist forests in the Western Ghats from 400 to 1,000 metres elevation.
