= Hopea vietnamensis =

Scientific classification
- Kingdom: Plantae
- Clade: Embryophytes
- Clade: Tracheophytes
- Clade: Angiosperms
- Clade: Eudicots
- Clade: Rosids
- Order: Malvales
- Family: Dipterocarpaceae
- Genus: Hopea
- Species: H. vietnamensis

Binomial name
- Hopea vietnamensis H.V.Sam & V.D.Vu

Species of flowering plant

Hopea vietnamensis is a species of flowering plant in the family Dipterocarpaceae. It is a tree endemic to Vietnam.

The species was first described by Hoang Van Sam and Van Dung Vu in 2013.
