= Hopea dasyrrhachis =

Conservation status
- Data Deficient (IUCN 3.1)

Scientific classification
- Kingdom: Plantae
- Clade: Embryophytes
- Clade: Tracheophytes
- Clade: Spermatophytes
- Clade: Angiosperms
- Clade: Eudicots
- Clade: Rosids
- Order: Malvales
- Family: Dipterocarpaceae
- Genus: Hopea
- Species: H. dasyrrhachis

Binomial name
- Hopea dasyrrhachis Slooten

Synonyms
- Shorea dasyrrhachis Slooten ex Endert

Species of tree

Hopea dasyrrhachis is a species of flowering plant in the family Dipterocarpaceae. It is a tree native to northern and western Borneo, including Brunei, Kalimantan (Indonesia), and Sabah and Sarawak (Malaysia).
