= Hopea macrocarpa =

Conservation status
- Critically Endangered (IUCN 3.1)

Scientific classification
- Kingdom: Plantae
- Clade: Tracheophytes
- Clade: Angiosperms
- Clade: Eudicots
- Clade: Rosids
- Order: Malvales
- Family: Dipterocarpaceae
- Genus: Hopea
- Species: H. macrocarpa

Binomial name
- Hopea macrocarpa Poopath & Sookch.

Species of flowering plant

Hopea macrocarpa (Thai: chan hom) is a species of flowering plant in the family Dipterocarpaceae. It is a tree endemic to Peninsular Thailand.

It grows from 20 to 30 metres tall, and flowers between March and May, and fruits in June and August. It is native to Narathiwat Province of southern Thailand, where it grows in evergreen lowland rain forest from 50 to 300 metres elevation. It is known from a single population, and all known individuals are within a 50 km radius.

The species is threatened by commercial timber logging and habitat loss from agricultural expansion, and the IUCN assesses the species as critically endangered.

The species was first described by Manop Poopath and Duangchai Sookchaloem in 2017.
