= Hopea discolor =

Conservation status
- Endangered (IUCN 3.1)

Scientific classification
- Kingdom: Plantae
- Clade: Tracheophytes
- Clade: Angiosperms
- Clade: Eudicots
- Clade: Rosids
- Order: Malvales
- Family: Dipterocarpaceae
- Genus: Hopea
- Species: H. discolor

Binomial name
- Hopea discolor Thwaites

Species of tree

Hopea discolor is a species of flowering plant in the family Dipterocarpaceae. It is a tree endemic to Sri Lanka. It is native to southwestern Sri Lanka, where it grows in pure stands on ridges in lowland evergreen rain forest. The species has a limited range, and is threatened with habitat loss from expansion of tea plantations and settlements. The IUCN Red List assesses the species as Endangered.

The species was described by George Henry Kendrick Thwaites in 1858.
