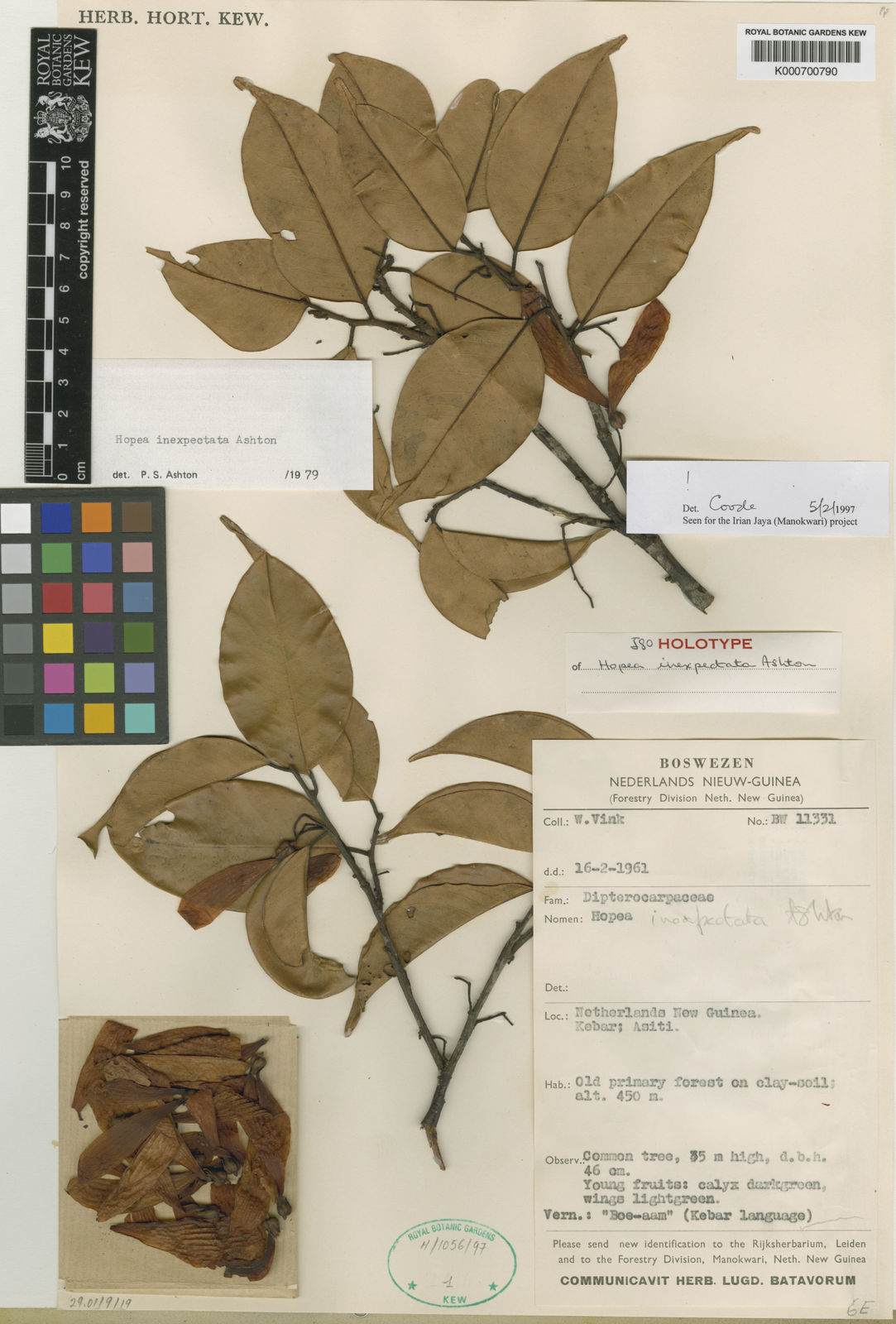

Conservation status
- Critically Endangered (IUCN 3.1)

Scientific classification
- Kingdom: Plantae
- Clade: Tracheophytes
- Clade: Angiosperms
- Clade: Eudicots
- Clade: Rosids
- Order: Malvales
- Family: Dipterocarpaceae
- Genus: Hopea
- Species: H. inexpectata

Binomial name
- Hopea inexpectata P.S.Ashton

= Hopea inexpectata =

Species of tree

Hopea inexpectata is a species of plant in the family Dipterocarpaceae. It is a large tree, growing up to 35 meters tall, which is endemic to New Guinea. It is known from a single location in Western (Indonesian) New Guinea, where it grows in primary lowland rain forest on clay soil from 450 to 600 meters elevation.

The species was first described by Peter Shaw Ashton in 1978.
