= Hopea bilitonensis =

Conservation status
- Critically Endangered (IUCN 3.1)

Scientific classification
- Kingdom: Plantae
- Clade: Tracheophytes
- Clade: Angiosperms
- Clade: Eudicots
- Clade: Rosids
- Order: Malvales
- Family: Dipterocarpaceae
- Genus: Hopea
- Species: H. bilitonensis

Binomial name
- Hopea bilitonensis P.S.Ashton

Species of tree

Hopea bilitonensis is a species of plant in the family Dipterocarpaceae. It is native to Perak in northwestern Peninsular Malaysia and the Indonesian islands of Bangka and Belitung (formerly Billiton) near the east coast of Sumatra. It grows in lowland rain forest and dry forest on limestone substrates from 33 to 400 metres elevation.

The species was first described by Peter Shaw Ashton in 1978.
