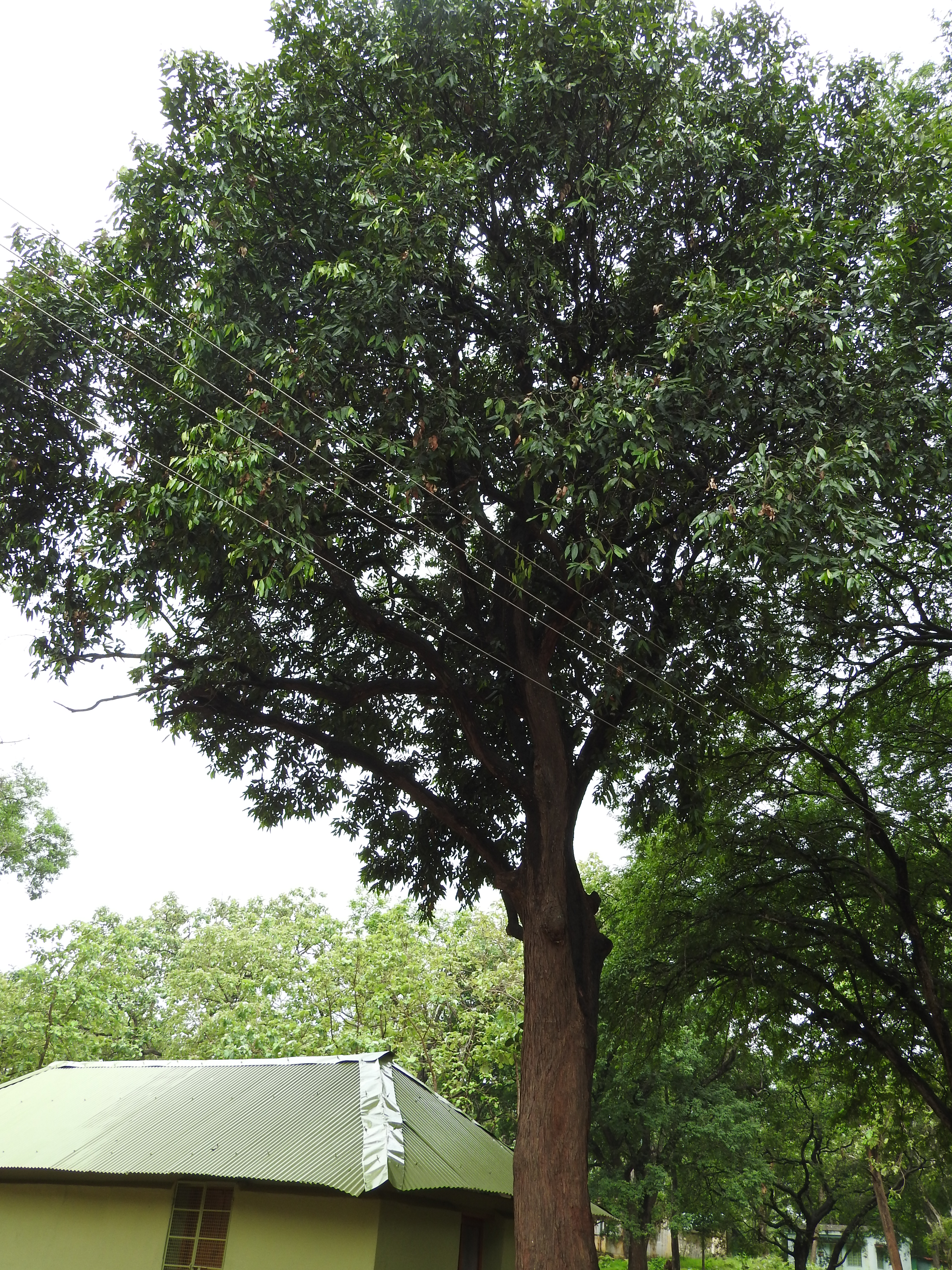
- Hopea utilis in the Kalakkad Mundanthurai Tiger Reserve in India

Conservation status
- Endangered (IUCN 3.1)

Scientific classification
- Kingdom: Plantae
- Clade: Tracheophytes
- Clade: Angiosperms
- Clade: Eudicots
- Clade: Rosids
- Order: Malvales
- Family: Dipterocarpaceae
- Genus: Hopea
- Species: H. longifolia

Binomial name
- Hopea longifolia Dyer

Synonyms
- Balanocarpus utilis Bedd.; Hopea utilis (Bedd.) Bole

= Hopea longifolia =

Species of tree

Hopea longifolia is a species of flowering plant in the family Dipterocarpaceae. It is a tree native to Kerala and Tamil Nadu in southern India. It is a slow-growing tree up to 25 metres tall. It grows in medium-elevation evergreen and semi-evergreen rain forests of the Western Ghats, generally in riverine areas, from 300 to 800 metres elevation. The species is exploited for timber, and is assessed as endangered with fewer than 250 mature trees remaining.
