= Hopea coriacea =

Conservation status
- Vulnerable (IUCN 3.1)

Scientific classification
- Kingdom: Plantae
- Clade: Tracheophytes
- Clade: Angiosperms
- Clade: Eudicots
- Clade: Rosids
- Order: Malvales
- Family: Dipterocarpaceae
- Genus: Hopea
- Species: H. coriacea

Binomial name
- Hopea coriacea Burck

Synonyms
- Hopea garangbuaya P.S.Ashton; Hopea kelantanensis Symington

Species of tree

Hopea coriacea is a species of flowering plant in the family Dipterocarpaceae. It is a tree native to Borneo and Peninsular Malaysia. It is a large canopy tree, up to 45 metres tall. It grows in lowland rain forests, on low hills, ridges, and on river banks, up to 400 metres elevation. The species is threatened with habitat loss from timber logging and expansion of agriculture and plantations. The IUCN Red List assesses the species as Vulnerable.
