= Hopea pedicellata =

Conservation status
- Endangered (IUCN 3.1)

Scientific classification
- Kingdom: Plantae
- Clade: Embryophytes
- Clade: Tracheophytes
- Clade: Angiosperms
- Clade: Eudicots
- Clade: Rosids
- Order: Malvales
- Family: Dipterocarpaceae
- Genus: Hopea
- Species: H. pedicellata

Binomial name
- Hopea pedicellata (Brandis) Symington

Species of tree

Hopea pedicellata is a tree in the family Dipterocarpaceae. The specific epithet pedicellata, refers to the species' prominent pedicel (flower stalk).

== Description ==
Hopea pedicellata grows as a canopy tree, up to 40 metres (130 ft) tall, with a trunk diameter of up to 60 cm (24 in). It has buttresses and stilt roots. The bark is smooth. The leathery leaves are ovate to lanceolate and measure up to 9 cm (4 in) long. The inflorescences measure up to 4 cm (2 in) long and bear up to seven yellow flowers. The nuts are egg-shaped and measure up to 0.6 cm (0.2 in) long.

== Distribution and habitat ==
Hopea pedicellata is native to Thailand, Peninsular Malaysia, Singapore and Borneo. Its habitat is mixed dipterocarp forests and hilly areas, to elevations of 1,000 m (3,300 ft).

== Conservation ==
Hopea pedicellata has been assessed as endangered on the IUCN Red List. It is threatened by land conversion for agriculture. The species is found in some protected areas.
