= Hopea longirostrata =

Conservation status
- Endangered (IUCN 3.1)

Scientific classification
- Kingdom: Plantae
- Clade: Embryophytes
- Clade: Tracheophytes
- Clade: Angiosperms
- Clade: Eudicots
- Clade: Rosids
- Order: Malvales
- Family: Dipterocarpaceae
- Genus: Hopea
- Species: H. longirostrata

Binomial name
- Hopea longirostrata P.S.Ashton

Species of tree

Hopea longirostrata is a tree in the family Dipterocarpaceae, native to Borneo. The specific epithet longirostrata means "long-beaked", referring to the shape of the fruit.

== Description ==
Hopea longirostrata grows just below the canopy, up to 14 metres (50 ft) tall. It has thin buttresses. The bark is smooth. The leathery leaves are ovate to elliptic and measure up to 9 cm (4 in) long. The nuts are egg-shaped and measure up to 0.6 cm (0.2 in) long.

== Distribution and habitat ==
Hopea longirostrata is endemic to Borneo, where it is confined to Sarawak. Its habitat is mixed dipterocarp forests, to elevations of 300 m (1,000 ft).

== Conservation ==
Hopea longirostrata has been assessed as endangered on the IUCN Red List. It is threatened by logging for its timber and by land conversion for palm oil plantations. The species is protected in Semenggoh Nature Reserve.
