= Hopea bancana =

Conservation status
- Critically Endangered (IUCN 3.1)

Scientific classification
- Kingdom: Plantae
- Clade: Tracheophytes
- Clade: Angiosperms
- Clade: Eudicots
- Clade: Rosids
- Order: Malvales
- Family: Dipterocarpaceae
- Genus: Hopea
- Species: H. bancana

Binomial name
- Hopea bancana (Boerl.) Slooten

Synonyms
- Balanocarpus bancanus Boerl.

Species of tropical tree

Hopea bancana is a species of flowering plant in the family Dipterocarpaceae. It is endemic to Sumatra.
