= Hopea foxworthyi =

Conservation status
- Endangered (IUCN 3.1)

Scientific classification
- Kingdom: Plantae
- Clade: Tracheophytes
- Clade: Angiosperms
- Clade: Eudicots
- Clade: Rosids
- Order: Malvales
- Family: Dipterocarpaceae
- Genus: Hopea
- Species: H. foxworthyi

Binomial name
- Hopea foxworthyi Elmer

Synonyms
- Hopea glutinosa Elmer

Species of tree

Hopea foxworthyi is an evergreen tree of the family Dipterocarpaceae. It is endemic to Sibuyan Island in the Philippines.

The species has been designated as endangered by the International Union for Conservation of Nature (IUCN). The survival of this tree in the wild is threatened by widespread harvesting of its wood, which is used as construction timber. It grows in primary forest at altitudes up to 700 metres (2,000 ft).
