= Hopea rudiformis =

Conservation status
- Critically Endangered (IUCN 3.1)

Scientific classification
- Kingdom: Plantae
- Clade: Embryophytes
- Clade: Tracheophytes
- Clade: Angiosperms
- Clade: Eudicots
- Clade: Rosids
- Order: Malvales
- Family: Dipterocarpaceae
- Genus: Hopea
- Species: H. rudiformis

Binomial name
- Hopea rudiformis P.S.Ashton

Species of tree

Hopea rudiformis is a tree in the family Dipterocarpaceae which is endemic to Borneo.

The species was first described by Peter Shaw Ashton in 1978. The specific epithet rudiformis means 'sword-shaped', referring to the leaf.

== Description ==
Hopea rudiformis grows below the forest canopy, up to 35 metres (110 ft) tall, with a trunk diameter of up to 40 cm (16 in). It has buttresses up to 1 m (3 ft), as well as flying (detached) buttresses and stilt roots. The bark is smooth and greyish. The leathery leaves are shaped ovate to lanceolate and measure up to 14 cm (6 in) long. The inflorescences measure up to 3.5 cm (1 in) and bear up to three purple-red flowers. The nuts are egg-shaped or roundish, measuring up to 0.8 cm (0.3 in) long.

== Distribution and habitat ==
Hopea rudiformis is endemic to Borneo. Its habitat is lowland rain forests, sometimes in swamps, to elevations of 500 m (1,600 ft).

== Conservation ==
Hopea rudiformis has been assessed as Critically Endangered on the IUCN Red List. It is threatened mainly by logging for its timber. It is also threatened by land conversion for agriculture. In Kalimantan, the species is threatened by fires. The species is found in some protected areas.
