= Hopea nigra =

Conservation status
- Vulnerable (IUCN 3.1)

Scientific classification
- Kingdom: Plantae
- Clade: Tracheophytes
- Clade: Angiosperms
- Clade: Eudicots
- Clade: Rosids
- Order: Malvales
- Family: Dipterocarpaceae
- Genus: Hopea
- Species: H. nigra

Binomial name
- Hopea nigra Burck

Species of tree

Hopea nigra is a species of flowering plant in the family Dipterocarpaceae. It is a tree endemic to eastern Sumatra. It grows in lowland mixed dipterocarp rain forest up to 400 metres elevation. It is threatened with habitat loss. The IUCN Red List assesses the species as Vulnerable.

The species was described by William Burck in 1887.
