= Hopea ovoidea =

Conservation status
- Data Deficient (IUCN 3.1)

Scientific classification
- Kingdom: Plantae
- Clade: Embryophytes
- Clade: Tracheophytes
- Clade: Angiosperms
- Clade: Eudicots
- Clade: Rosids
- Order: Malvales
- Family: Dipterocarpaceae
- Genus: Hopea
- Species: H. ovoidea

Binomial name
- Hopea ovoidea P.S.Ashton

Species of tree

Hopea ovoidea is a tree in the family Dipterocarpaceae, native to Borneo. The specific epithet ovoidea means "egg-shaped" referring to the flower's ovary.

== Description ==
Hopea ovoidea grows as a canopy tree, with a trunk diameter of up to 1 metre (3 ft). It has buttresses. The bark is flaky. The papery leaves are ovate to elliptic and measure up to 13 cm (5 in) long. The inflorescences measure up to 13 cm (5 in) long and bear up to seven cream flowers.

== Distribution and habitat ==
Hopea ovoidea is endemic to Borneo, where it is confined to Sabah. A record of the species in Sumatra is unconfirmed. Its habitat is mixed dipterocarp forests on hills near the coast, to elevations of 34 m (100 ft).
