= Hopea helferi =

Conservation status
- Endangered (IUCN 3.1)

Scientific classification
- Kingdom: Plantae
- Clade: Tracheophytes
- Clade: Angiosperms
- Clade: Eudicots
- Clade: Rosids
- Order: Malvales
- Family: Dipterocarpaceae
- Genus: Hopea
- Species: H. helferi

Binomial name
- Hopea helferi (Dyer) Brandis

Synonyms
- Hopea dealbata Hance; Shorea helferi (Dyer) Kurz; Vatica helferi Dyer

Species of tree

Hopea helferi is a critically endangered species of flowering plant in the family Dipterocarpaceae. It is found in Cambodia, the Andaman Islands of India, Peninsular Malaysia, Myanmar, and Thailand.
