= Hopea papuana =

Conservation status
- Least Concern (IUCN 3.1)

Scientific classification
- Kingdom: Plantae
- Clade: Tracheophytes
- Clade: Angiosperms
- Clade: Eudicots
- Clade: Rosids
- Order: Malvales
- Family: Dipterocarpaceae
- Genus: Hopea
- Species: H. papuana

Binomial name
- Hopea papuana Diels

Species of flowering plant

Hopea papuana is a species of flowering plant]] in the family Dipterocarpaceae. It is a tree endemic to New Guinea. It is native to lowland rain forest, where it grows in alluvial soil on riverbanks and on lowland hills.

The species was first described in 1922 by Friedrich Ludwig Emil Diels.
