= Hopea tenuinervula =

Conservation status
- Near Threatened (IUCN 3.1)

Scientific classification
- Kingdom: Plantae
- Clade: Tracheophytes
- Clade: Angiosperms
- Clade: Eudicots
- Clade: Rosids
- Order: Malvales
- Family: Dipterocarpaceae
- Genus: Hopea
- Species: H. tenuinervula

Binomial name
- Hopea tenuinervula P.S.Ashton

Species of flowering plant

Hopea tenuinervula is a tree in the family Dipterocarpaceae, native to Borneo.

== Description ==
Hopea tenuinervula grows below the forest canopy, up to 30 metres (100 ft) tall, with a trunk diameter of up to 35 cm (14 in). It has buttresses and stilt roots up to 1 m (3 ft) tall. The bark is flaky and reddish-brown in patches. The leathery leaves are shaped ovate to lanceolate and measure up to 27 cm (11 in) long. The inflorescences measure up to 8 cm (3 in) long and bear up to four yellow flowers. The nuts are egg-shaped and measure up to 1.2 cm (0.5 in) long.

== Taxonomy ==
The species was described by Peter Shaw Ashton in 1967. The type specimen was collected in Lundu District, in Sarawak. The specific epithet tenuinervula means 'slender nerve', referring to the leaf veins.

== Distribution and habitat ==
Hopea tenuinervula is endemic to Borneo. Its habitat is mixed dipterocarp forests, to elevations of 400 m (1,300 ft).

== Conservation ==
The species, as Hopea tenuivervula, has been assessed as near threatened on the IUCN Red List. It is threatened by logging for its timber and conversion of land for plantations. The species is found in some protected areas.
