= Hopea kerangasensis =

Conservation status
- Vulnerable (IUCN 3.1)

Scientific classification
- Kingdom: Plantae
- Clade: Tracheophytes
- Clade: Angiosperms
- Clade: Eudicots
- Clade: Rosids
- Order: Malvales
- Family: Dipterocarpaceae
- Genus: Hopea
- Species: H. kerangasensis

Binomial name
- Hopea kerangasensis P.S.Ashton

Species of tree

Hopea kerangasensis is a species of flowering plant in the family Dipterocarpaceae. It a tree native to Borneo, Peninsular Malaysia, and Sumatra. It is a tall tree which can grow up to 40 metres tall. It grows in heath forests (kerangas) and lowland rain forests on sandstone. It is threatened with habitat loss from logging and expansion of agriculture and plantations. The IUCN Red List assesses the species as Vulnerable.

The species was described by Peter Shaw Ashton in 1967.
