= Hopea reticulata =

Conservation status
- Endangered (IUCN 3.1)

Scientific classification
- Kingdom: Plantae
- Clade: Tracheophytes
- Clade: Angiosperms
- Clade: Eudicots
- Clade: Rosids
- Order: Malvales
- Family: Dipterocarpaceae
- Genus: Hopea
- Species: H. reticulata

Binomial name
- Hopea reticulata Tardieu

Synonyms
- Hopea exalata W.T.Lin, Y.Y.Yang & Q.S.Hsue; Hopea reticulata subsp. exalata (W.T.Lin, Y.Y.Yang & Q.S.Hsue) Y.K.Yang & J.K.Wu

Species of tree

Hopea reticulata is a species of tree in the family Dipterocarpaceae. It is native to China (Hainan) and Vietnam. Flora of China and Plants of the World Online consider Hopea exalata of Hainan a synonym of this species.
