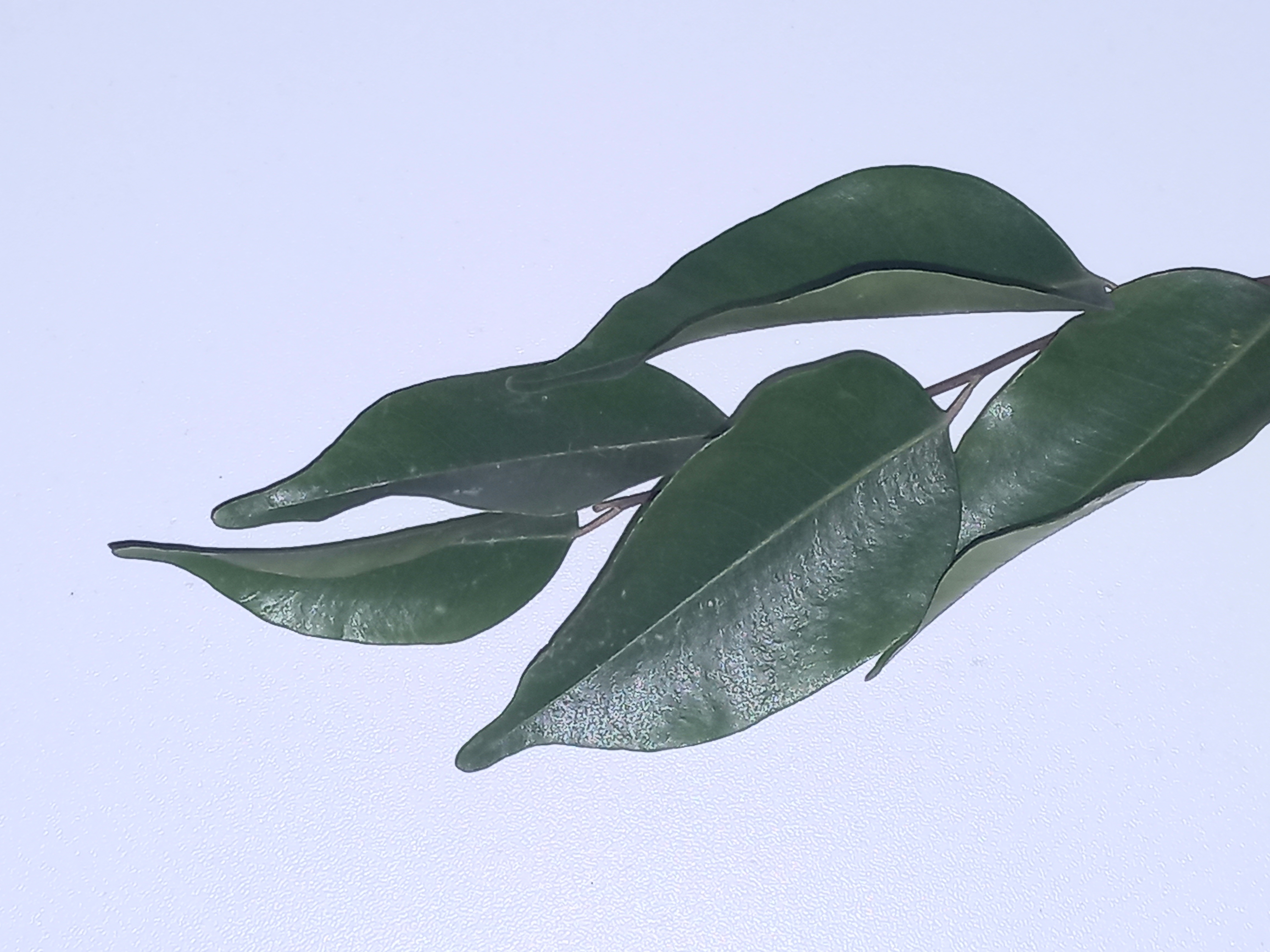
- Leaves

Conservation status
- Least Concern (IUCN 3.1)

Scientific classification
- Kingdom: Plantae
- Clade: Embryophytes
- Clade: Tracheophytes
- Clade: Angiosperms
- Clade: Eudicots
- Clade: Rosids
- Order: Malvales
- Family: Dipterocarpaceae
- Genus: Hopea
- Species: H. dryobalanoides

Binomial name
- Hopea dryobalanoides Miq.

Synonyms
- Hancea dryobalanoides (Miq.) Pierre; Hopea borneensis F.Heim; Hopea sarawakensis F.Heim

= Hopea dryobalanoides =

Species of tree

Hopea dryobalanoides is a tree in the family Dipterocarpaceae. It is native to Peninsular Thailand, Peninsular Malaysia, Sumatra, and Borneo.

The species was described by Friedrich Anton Wilhelm Miquel in 1861. The specific epithet dryobalanoides means "resembling Dryobalanops", referring to that genus of trees and particularly their leaf veins.

== Description ==
Hopea dryobalanoides grows up to 45 metres (150 ft) tall, with a trunk diameter of up to 1.3 m (4 ft). It has buttresses up to 2 m (7 ft) tall. The bark is cracked and flaky. The papery leaves are lanceolate to ovate and measure up to 12 cm (5 in) long. The inflorescences bear up to six yellowish-cream flowers. The nuts are egg-shaped, measuring up to 1 cm (0.4 in) long.

== Distribution and habitat ==
Hopea dryobalanoides is native to Peninsular Malaysia, Sumatra and Borneo. Its habitat is mixed dipterocarp forest, to elevations of 600 m (2,000 ft).
