= Hopea sasidharanii =

Scientific classification
- Kingdom: Plantae
- Clade: Tracheophytes
- Clade: Angiosperms
- Clade: Eudicots
- Clade: Rosids
- Order: Malvales
- Family: Dipterocarpaceae
- Genus: Hopea
- Species: H. sasidharanii

Binomial name
- Hopea sasidharanii Robi & Sujanapal

Species of flowering plant

Hopea sasidharanii is a species of flowering plant in the family Dipterocarpaceae. It is a tree endemic to Kerala state in southwestern India.

The species was first described by Aloor Jose Robi and P. Sujanapal in 2020.
