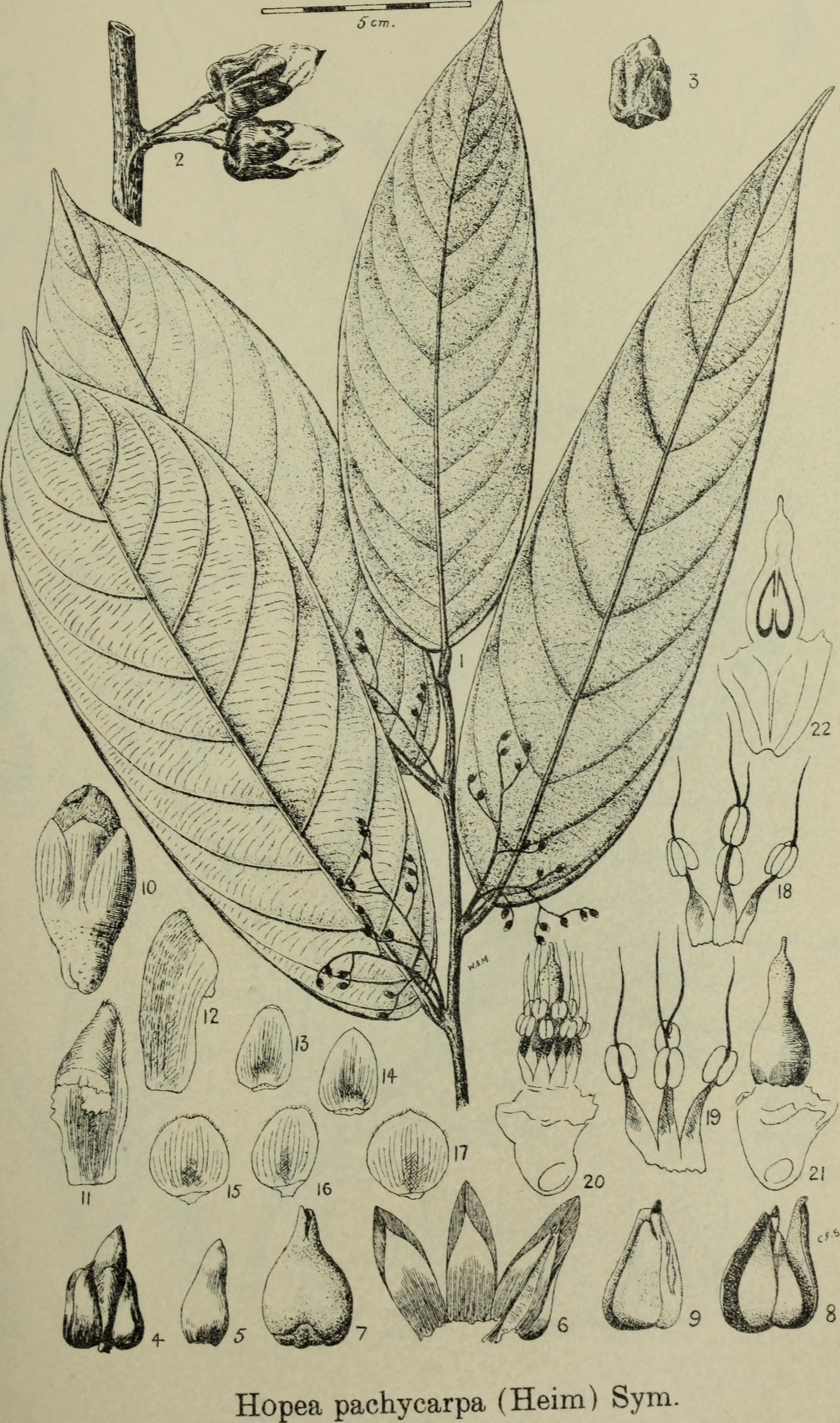
- Hopea pachycarpa

Conservation status
- Vulnerable (IUCN 3.1)

Scientific classification
- Kingdom: Plantae
- Clade: Tracheophytes
- Clade: Angiosperms
- Clade: Eudicots
- Clade: Rosids
- Order: Malvales
- Family: Dipterocarpaceae
- Genus: Hopea
- Species: H. pachycarpa

Binomial name
- Hopea pachycarpa (F.Heim) Symington

Synonyms
- Balanocarpus pubescens Ridl.; Hopea laxa Symington; Hopea resinosa Symington; Pierrea pachycarpa F.Heim (1891) (basionym); Pierreocarpus pachycarpus Ridl. ex Symington

= Hopea pachycarpa =

Species of tree

Hopea pachycarpa is a species of flowering plant in the family Dipterocarpaceae. It is a tree native to Sumatra, Peninsular Malaysia and Borneo.
