= Hopea mindanensis =

Conservation status
- Endangered (IUCN 3.1)

Scientific classification
- Kingdom: Plantae
- Clade: Tracheophytes
- Clade: Angiosperms
- Clade: Eudicots
- Clade: Rosids
- Order: Malvales
- Family: Dipterocarpaceae
- Genus: Hopea
- Species: H. mindanensis

Binomial name
- Hopea mindanensis Foxw.

Species of tree

Hopea mindanensis is a species of plant in the family Dipterocarpaceae. It is endemic to the Mindanao islands region of the southern Philippines.
