= Hopea sphaerocarpa =

Conservation status
- Near Threatened (IUCN 3.1)

Scientific classification
- Kingdom: Plantae
- Clade: Tracheophytes
- Clade: Angiosperms
- Clade: Eudicots
- Clade: Rosids
- Order: Malvales
- Family: Dipterocarpaceae
- Genus: Hopea
- Species: H. sphaerocarpa

Binomial name
- Hopea sphaerocarpa (F.Heim) P.S.Ashton

Synonyms
- Balanocarpus sphaerocarpus F.Heim

Species of flowering plant

Hopea sphaerocarpa is a tree in the family Dipterocarpaceae. It is native to Borneo.

== Description ==
Hopea sphaerocarpa grows up to 10 metres (30 ft) tall, with a trunk diameter of up to 10 cm (4 in). It has buttresses, including flying (detached) buttresses, and stilt roots. The bark is smooth. The papery leaves are ovate to lanceolate and measure up to 10 cm (4 in) long. The inflorescences measure up to 10 cm (4 in) long and bear dark red flowers. The nuts are egg-shaped and measure up to 1 cm (0.4 in) long.

== Taxonomy ==
The species was originally described as Balanocarpus sphaerocarpus by French botanist Frédéric Louis Heim in 1892, as part of his doctoral thesis. In 1963, British botanist Peter Shaw Ashton transferred the species to the genus Hopea. The type specimen was collected in Sarawak, Borneo. The specific epithet sphaerocarpa means 'round fruit'.

== Distribution and habitat ==
Hopea sphaerocarpa is endemic to Borneo. Its habitat is dipterocarp forests near rivers, at elevations to 530 m (1,700 ft).

== Conservation ==
Hopea sphaerocarpa has been assessed as near threatened on the IUCN Red List. It is threatened by conversion of land for palm oil plantations and other intensive agriculture. It is also threatened by logging activities. The species is found in some protected areas.
