= Hopea iriana =

Conservation status
- Near Threatened (IUCN 3.1)

Scientific classification
- Kingdom: Plantae
- Clade: Tracheophytes
- Clade: Angiosperms
- Clade: Eudicots
- Clade: Rosids
- Order: Malvales
- Family: Dipterocarpaceae
- Genus: Hopea
- Species: H. iriana

Binomial name
- Hopea iriana Slooten

Synonyms
- Hopea nabirensis Slooten

Species of flowering plant

Hopea iriana is a species of flowering plants in the family Dipterocarpaceae. It is a tree endemic to New Guinea. It is a large canopy tree up to 40 metres tall, which grows in lowland and hill evergreen rain forests. It is known from Milne Bay, Western, Morobe, and East and West Sepik provinces of Papua New Guinea, and other parts of Papua New Guinea and Western New Guinea.

The species is threatened by extensive commercial timber logging of New Guinea's lowland rain forests, and the IUCN Red List assesses the species as Near threatened.
