= Hopea canarensis =

Conservation status
- Endangered (IUCN 3.1)

Scientific classification
- Kingdom: Plantae
- Clade: Tracheophytes
- Clade: Angiosperms
- Clade: Eudicots
- Clade: Rosids
- Order: Malvales
- Family: Dipterocarpaceae
- Genus: Hopea
- Species: H. canarensis

Binomial name
- Hopea canarensis Hole

Species of tree

Hopea canarensis is a species of plant in the family Dipterocarpaceae. It is endemic to Karnataka state in southwestern India. It is a large tree which grows up to 30 metres tall. It grows in lowland and montane moist forests in the Western Ghats from 750 to 1,440 metres elevation, including in Shola forest enclaves surrounded by montane grasslands. The species is threatened by habitat loss and habitat degradation, and the IUCN Red List assesses the species as Endangered.

The species was described in 1918 by Robert Selby Hole.
