= Hopea gregaria =

Conservation status
- Endangered (IUCN 3.1)

Scientific classification
- Kingdom: Plantae
- Clade: Tracheophytes
- Clade: Angiosperms
- Clade: Eudicots
- Clade: Rosids
- Order: Malvales
- Family: Dipterocarpaceae
- Genus: Hopea
- Species: H. gregaria

Binomial name
- Hopea gregaria Slooten

Species of tree

Hopea gregaria is a species of flowering plant in the family Dipterocarpaceae. It is a tree native to southeastern Sulawesi. It is a medium-sized tree which grows up to 35 meters tall. It is native to primary lowland rain forest, where it grows gregariously in well-drained, hilly, and steep places on stony and clay soils from 20 to 300 meters elevation. It is an endangered species threatened by habitat loss.

The species was described by Dirk Fok van Slooten in 1952.
