= Hopea sangal =

Conservation status
- Vulnerable (IUCN 3.1)

Scientific classification
- Kingdom: Plantae
- Clade: Tracheophytes
- Clade: Angiosperms
- Clade: Eudicots
- Clade: Rosids
- Order: Malvales
- Family: Dipterocarpaceae
- Genus: Hopea
- Species: H. sangal

Binomial name
- Hopea sangal Korth.

Synonyms
- Doona javanica Burck; Doona micrantha (Hassk.) Burck; Dryobalanops neglectus Korth. ex Burck; Dryobalanops sericea Korth.; Hopea curtisii King; Hopea fagifolia Miq.; Hopea globosa Brandis; Hopea hasskarliana F.Heim; Hopea javanica (Burck) F.Heim; Hopea lowii Dyer ex Brandis; Hopea macrosepala Boerl. ex Symington; Hopea minutiflora C.E.C.Fisch.; Hopea sericea (Korth.) Blume; Petalandra micrantha Hassk.

Species of tree

Hopea sangal is a tree in the family Dipterocarpaceae. It is native to tropical Asia.

== Description ==
Hopea sangal grows as a canopy tree, up to 40 metres (130 ft) tall, with a trunk diameter of up to 1.3 m (4 ft). It has buttresses. The bark is cracked and scaly. The papery leaves are ovate and measure up to 10 cm (4 in) long. The inflorescences measure up to 7 cm (3 in) long and bear cream flowers. The nuts are egg-shaped and measure up to 0.7 cm (0.3 in) long.

== Distribution and habitat ==
Hopea sangal is native to Thailand, Peninsular Malaysia, Singapore, Sumatra, Borneo, Java and Bali. Its habitat is dipterocarp forests, sometimes by rivers, to elevations of 500 m (1,600 ft). In the Kalimantan region of Borneo, ectomycorrhizal (symbiotic) relationships with this species have been reported.

== Conservation ==
Hopea sangal has been assessed as vulnerable on the IUCN Red List. It is threatened by land conversion for agriculture and palm oil plantations. It is also threatened by logging for its timber. The species is found in some protected areas.
