= Hopea mesuoides =

Conservation status
- Least Concern (IUCN 3.1)

Scientific classification
- Kingdom: Plantae
- Clade: Embryophytes
- Clade: Tracheophytes
- Clade: Angiosperms
- Clade: Eudicots
- Clade: Rosids
- Order: Malvales
- Family: Dipterocarpaceae
- Genus: Hopea
- Species: H. mesuoides

Binomial name
- Hopea mesuoides P.S.Ashton

Species of tree

Hopea mesuoides is a tree in the family Dipterocarpaceae, native to Borneo. The specific epithet mesuoides refers to the species' resemblance to the genus Mesua.

== Description ==
Hopea mesuoides grows just below the canopy, up to 30 metres (100 ft) tall, with a trunk diameter of up to 50 cm (20 in). It has flying (detached) buttresses and stilt roots. The bark is smooth. The leathery leaves are lanceolate to ovate and measure up to 14 cm (6 in) long. The inflorescences measure up to 4 cm (2 in) long and bear dark red flowers.

== Distribution and habitat ==
Hopea mesuoides is endemic to Borneo. Its habitat is heath and dipterocarp forests, to elevations of 200 m (700 ft).
