= Hopea similis =

Conservation status
- Least Concern (IUCN 3.1)

Scientific classification
- Kingdom: Plantae
- Clade: Tracheophytes
- Clade: Angiosperms
- Clade: Eudicots
- Clade: Rosids
- Order: Malvales
- Family: Dipterocarpaceae
- Genus: Hopea
- Species: H. similis

Binomial name
- Hopea similis Slooten

Species of flowering plant

Hopea similis is a species of flowering plant in the family Dipterocarpaceae. It is a medium-sized tree endemic to New Guinea. It grows in lowland rain forest, especially on ridges, in both eastern and western New Guinea.

The species was first described by Dirk Fok van Slooten in 1953.
