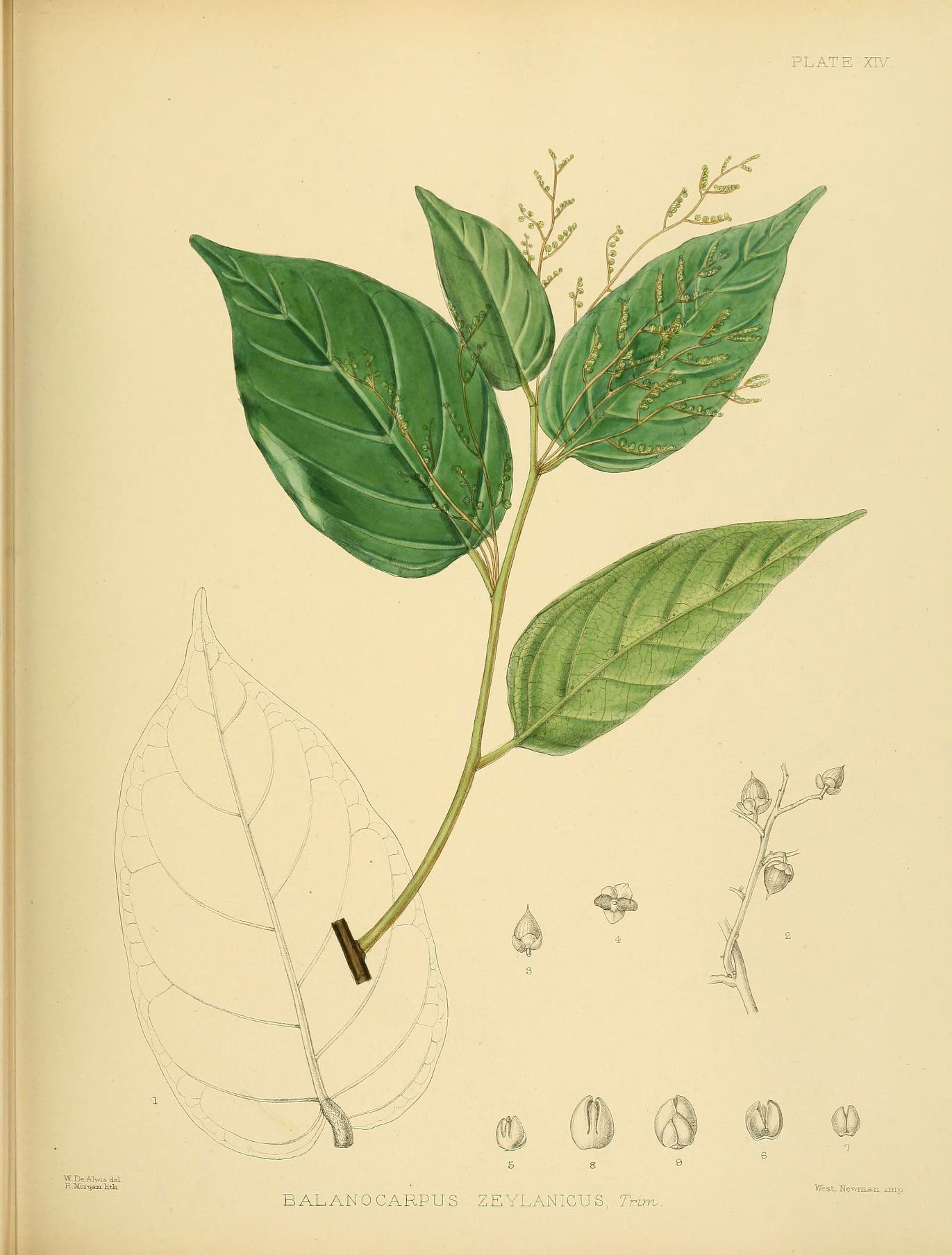

Conservation status
- Endangered (IUCN 3.1)

Scientific classification
- Kingdom: Plantae
- Clade: Tracheophytes
- Clade: Angiosperms
- Clade: Eudicots
- Clade: Rosids
- Order: Malvales
- Family: Dipterocarpaceae
- Genus: Hopea
- Species: H. brevipetiolaris

Binomial name
- Hopea brevipetiolaris (Thwaites ex Trimen) P.S.Ashton

Synonyms
- Balanocarpus brevipetiolaris (Thwaites ex Trimen) Alston; Balanocarpus zeylanicus Trimen; Shorea brevipetiolaris Thwaites ex Trimen (1885)

= Hopea brevipetiolaris =

Species of tree

Hopea brevipetiolaris is a species of flowering plant in the family Dipterocarpaceae. It is a tree endemic to Sri Lanka. It is native to southwestern Sri Lanka, where it grows on rocky summits in remnant lowland semi-evergreen rain forest. Two subpopulations are known, the larger at the summit of Dunkanda in Kurunegala District and a small number of trees on Dombagaskanda in Kalutara District.
