= Hopea griffithii =

Conservation status
- Endangered (IUCN 3.1)

Scientific classification
- Kingdom: Plantae
- Clade: Embryophytes
- Clade: Tracheophytes
- Clade: Angiosperms
- Clade: Eudicots
- Clade: Rosids
- Order: Malvales
- Family: Dipterocarpaceae
- Genus: Hopea
- Species: H. griffithii

Binomial name
- Hopea griffithii Kurz

Synonyms
- Hancea griffithii (Kurz) Pierre

Species of tree

Hopea griffithii is a tree in the family Dipterocarpaceae. It is named for the British doctor and naturalist William Griffith.

== Description ==
Hopea griffithii grows as a canopy tree, up to 40 metres (130 ft) tall, with a trunk diameter of up to 60 cm (24 in). It has flying (detached) buttresses and stilt roots up to 1 m (3 ft) tall. The bark is smooth. The leathery leaves are lanceolate to ovate and measure up to 9 cm (4 in) long. The inflorescences measure up to 2.5 cm (1 in) long and bear up to five dark red flowers. The nuts are egg-shaped and measure up to 0.7 cm (0.3 in) long.

== Distribution and habitat ==
Hopea griffithii is native to southern Myanmar, southern Thailand, Peninsular Malaysia, Singapore and Borneo. Its habitat is mixed dipterocarp forests, to elevations of 500 m (1,600 ft).

== Conservation ==
Hopea griffithii has been assessed as endangered on the IUCN Red List. It is threatened by land conversion for agriculture and by logging for its timber. The species is found in some protected areas, particularly in Sarawak.
