= Hopea andersonii =

Conservation status
- Vulnerable (IUCN 3.1)

Scientific classification
- Kingdom: Plantae
- Clade: Tracheophytes
- Clade: Angiosperms
- Clade: Eudicots
- Clade: Rosids
- Order: Malvales
- Family: Dipterocarpaceae
- Genus: Hopea
- Species: H. andersonii

Binomial name
- Hopea andersonii P.S.Ashton

Species of tropical tree

Hopea andersonii is a tree in the family Dipterocarpaceae, native to Borneo. It is named for J. A. R. Anderson, a forest officer on the island.

== Description ==
Hopea andersonii grows as a canopy tree up to 40 metres (130 ft) tall, with a trunk diameter of up to 1.5 m (5 ft). It has buttresses up to 4 m (13 ft) tall. The bark is cracked or flaky. The leathery leaves are shaped elliptic, lanceolate or falcate and measure up to 14 cm (6 in) long. The inflorescences measure up to 12 cm (5 in) and bear cream flowers.

== Distribution and habitat ==
Hopea andersonii is endemic to Borneo. Its habitat is lowland dipterocarp forest.

== Conservation ==
Hopea andersonii has been assessed as vulnerable on the IUCN Red List. It is threatened mainly by logging for its timber. It is also threatened by conversion of land for agriculture and plantations. The species mostly occurs outside of protected areas.
