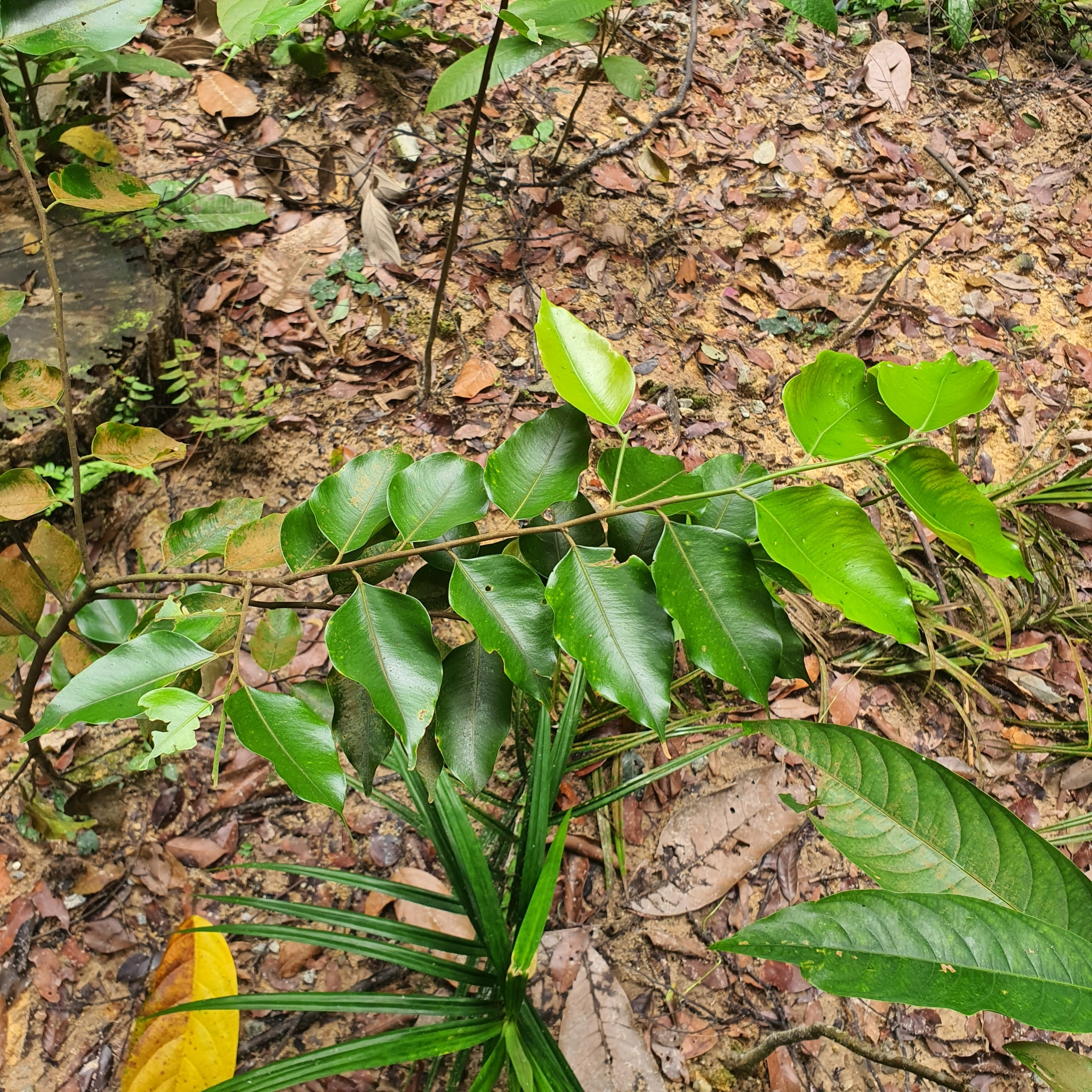
- In Singapore

Conservation status
- Vulnerable (IUCN 3.1)

Scientific classification
- Kingdom: Plantae
- Clade: Embryophytes
- Clade: Tracheophytes
- Clade: Angiosperms
- Clade: Eudicots
- Clade: Rosids
- Order: Malvales
- Family: Dipterocarpaceae
- Genus: Hopea
- Species: H. mengarawan

Binomial name
- Hopea mengarawan Miq.

Synonyms
- Hancea mengarawan (Miq.) Pierre

= Hopea mengarawan =

Species of flowering plant

Hopea mengarawan, formerly Hopea mengerawan, is a species of flowering plant in the family Dipterocarpaceae. It is a tree native to Borneo, Peninsular Malaysia, Singapore, and Sumatra. It is a tall tree which can grow up to 45 metres tall. It grows in lowland mixed dipterocarp rain forest, growing on the edges of swamps and on hillsides and ridges, on poorly drained, poor sandy, and clayey soils. It is threatened by habitat loss from timber logging and expansion of agriculture, plantations, and settlements. The IUCN Red List assesses the species as Vulnerable.

The species was described by Friedrich Anton Wilhelm Miquel in 1861.
