= Hopea plagata =

Conservation status
- Least Concern (IUCN 3.1)

Scientific classification
- Kingdom: Plantae
- Clade: Embryophytes
- Clade: Tracheophytes
- Clade: Angiosperms
- Clade: Eudicots
- Clade: Rosids
- Order: Malvales
- Family: Dipterocarpaceae
- Genus: Hopea
- Species: H. plagata

Binomial name
- Hopea plagata (Blanco) Vidal

Synonyms
- Anisoptera plagata (Blanco) Blume; Dipterocarpus plagatus (Blanco) Blanco; Mocanera plagata Blanco

Species of flowering plant

Hopea plagata is a species of flowering plant in the family Dipterocarpaceae. It is found in Borneo and the Philippines. The tree grows to 55 m (180 ft) tall.
