= Hopea myrtifolia =

Conservation status
- Vulnerable (IUCN 3.1)

Scientific classification
- Kingdom: Plantae
- Clade: Embryophytes
- Clade: Tracheophytes
- Clade: Angiosperms
- Clade: Eudicots
- Clade: Rosids
- Order: Malvales
- Family: Dipterocarpaceae
- Genus: Hopea
- Species: H. myrtifolia

Binomial name
- Hopea myrtifolia Miq.

Species of flowering plant

Hopea myrtifolia is a species of flowering plant in the family Dipterocarpaceae. It is a tree native to Borneo (Kalimantan), Peninsular Malaysia, and Sumatra.

It grows 25 to 40 metres (82 to 130 ft) tall. It is a locally common and gregarious species which grows in lowland dipterocarp rain forest. The species is in decline from habitat fragmentation by commercial timber logging and conversion of forests to oil palm plantations. The IUCN Red List assesses the species as vulnerable.

The species was first described by Friedrich Anton Wilhelm Miquel in 1861.
