= Hopea modesta =

Conservation status
- Vulnerable (IUCN 3.1)

Scientific classification
- Kingdom: Plantae
- Clade: Tracheophytes
- Clade: Angiosperms
- Clade: Eudicots
- Clade: Rosids
- Order: Malvales
- Family: Dipterocarpaceae
- Genus: Hopea
- Species: H. modesta

Binomial name
- Hopea modesta (A.DC.) Kosterm.

Synonyms
- Hopea jucunda subsp. modesta (A.DC.) Kosterm.; Hopea jucunda var. modesta A.DC. (1868) (basionym)

Species of flowering plant

Hopea modesta is a species of flowering plant in the family Dipterocarpaceae. It is a tree native to southern India and southwestern Sri Lanka. In Sri Lanka it is known from riverine areas of lowland rain forest. It is threatened with habitat loss from forest clearance for tea plantations and other agriculture, and the IUCN Red List assesses the species as vulnerable.

It was given its first formal botanical description as Hopea jucunda var. modesta by Alphonse Pyramus de Candolle in 1868. In 1980 André Joseph Guillaume Henri Kostermans re-designated it a subspecies of H. jucunda, and in 1982 recognised it as a full species, Hopea modesta.
