= Hopea altocollina =

Conservation status
- Endangered (IUCN 3.1)

Scientific classification
- Kingdom: Plantae
- Clade: Tracheophytes
- Clade: Angiosperms
- Clade: Eudicots
- Clade: Rosids
- Order: Malvales
- Family: Dipterocarpaceae
- Genus: Hopea
- Species: H. altocollina

Binomial name
- Hopea altocollina P.S.Ashton

Species of tropical tree

Hopea altocollina is a tree in the family Dipterocarpaceae which is native to Borneo.

The species was first described by Peter Shaw Ashton in 1967. The specific epithet altocollina means "high hills", referring to the species' habitat.

== Description ==
Hopea altocollina grows up to 50 metres (160 ft) tall, with a trunk diameter of up to 1.8 m (6 ft). It has buttresses up to 4 m (13 ft) tall. The bark is fissured and flaky. The leathery leaves are lanceolate and measure up to 10 cm (4 in) long. The inflorescences measure up to 8 cm (3 in) long and bear cream flowers. The nuts are egg-shaped and measure up to 0.7 cm (0.3 in) long.

== Distribution and habitat ==
Hopea altocollina is endemic to Borneo. Its habitat is dipterocarp forests, at elevations of 800–1,000 m (2,600–3,300 ft).

== Conservation ==
Hopea altocollina has been assessed as endangered on the IUCN Red List. It is threatened by logging for its timber. The species is found in some protected areas.
