= Hopea obscurinerva =

Conservation status
- Critically Endangered (IUCN 3.1)

Scientific classification
- Kingdom: Plantae
- Clade: Embryophytes
- Clade: Tracheophytes
- Clade: Angiosperms
- Clade: Eudicots
- Clade: Rosids
- Order: Malvales
- Family: Dipterocarpaceae
- Genus: Hopea
- Species: H. obscurinerva

Binomial name
- Hopea obscurinerva P.S.Ashton

Species of tree

Hopea obscurinerva is a tree in the family Dipterocarpaceae, native to Borneo. The specific epithet obscurinerva means 'indistinct nerve', referring to the veins on the underside of the leaf.

== Description ==
Hopea obscurinerva grows below the forest canopy, up to 10 metres (30 ft) tall, with a trunk diameter of up to 15 cm (6 in). It has low, thin buttresses. The bark is smooth. The leathery leaves are yellow-brown, shaped lanceolate to oblong and measure up to 26 cm (10 in) long. No flowers have been recorded.

== Distribution and habitat ==
Hopea obscurinerva is endemic to Borneo, where it is confined to Sarawak. Its habitat is mixed dipterocarp forest, to elevations of 300 m (1,000 ft).

== Conservation ==
Hopea obscurinerva has been assessed as critically endangered on the IUCN Red List. The species is known from only two locations. It is threatened by conversion of land for plantations and by logging. The species occurs outside of protected areas.
