= Hopea jucunda =

Conservation status
- Critically Endangered (IUCN 2.3)

Scientific classification
- Kingdom: Plantae
- Clade: Tracheophytes
- Clade: Angiosperms
- Clade: Eudicots
- Clade: Rosids
- Order: Malvales
- Family: Dipterocarpaceae
- Genus: Hopea
- Species: H. jucunda

Binomial name
- Hopea jucunda Thwaites

Species of tree

Hopea jucunda is a species of flowering plant in the family Dipterocarpaceae. It is a tree endemic to the island of Sri Lanka. The IUCN Red List assesses the species as critically endangered.

The species was first described by George Henry Kendrick Thwaites in 1864.

== Uses ==
Wood - construction timber.

== Culture ==
Known as රත් බෙරලිය (rath beraliya) in Sinhala.

== Sources ==
- https://www.researchgate.net/publication/244514431_Balanocarpol_a_new_polyphenol_from_Balanocarpus_zeylanicus(trimen)_and_Hopea_jucunda(Thw.)(Dipterocarpaceae)
- http://plants.jstor.org/specimen/k000700737
- http://pubs.rsc.org/en/Content/ArticleLanding/1985/P1/P19850001807
