= Hopea vacciniifolia =

Conservation status
- Endangered (IUCN 3.1)

Scientific classification
- Kingdom: Plantae
- Clade: Embryophytes
- Clade: Tracheophytes
- Clade: Angiosperms
- Clade: Eudicots
- Clade: Rosids
- Order: Malvales
- Family: Dipterocarpaceae
- Genus: Hopea
- Species: H. vacciniifolia

Binomial name
- Hopea vacciniifolia Ridl. ex P.S.Ashton

Species of tree

Hopea vacciniifolia is a tree in the family Dipterocarpaceae, native to Borneo. The specific epithet vacciniifolia refers to the leaves' similarity to those of the genus Vaccinium.

== Description ==
Hopea vacciniifolia grows up to 15 metres (50 ft) tall, with a trunk diameter of up to 15 cm (6 in). It has flying (detached) buttresses and stilt roots. The bark is smooth. The papery leaves are shaped ovate to elliptic and measure up to 2.5 cm (1 in) long. The inflorescences measure up to 1.3 cm (0.5 in) long and bear up to three red flowers. The nuts are egg-shaped and measure up to 0.8 cm (0.3 in) long.

== Distribution and habitat ==
Hopea vacciniifolia is endemic to Borneo. Its habitat is kerangas forests.

== Conservation ==
Hopea vacciniifolia has been assessed as endangered on the IUCN Red List. It is threatened by conversion of land for oil palm and other plantations. It is also threatened by logging for its timber. The species is found in some protected areas.
