= Hopea megacarpa =

Conservation status
- Endangered (IUCN 3.1)

Scientific classification
- Kingdom: Plantae
- Clade: Embryophytes
- Clade: Tracheophytes
- Clade: Angiosperms
- Clade: Eudicots
- Clade: Rosids
- Order: Malvales
- Family: Dipterocarpaceae
- Genus: Hopea
- Species: H. megacarpa

Binomial name
- Hopea megacarpa P.S.Ashton

Species of tree

Hopea megacarpa is a tree in the family Dipterocarpaceae, native to Borneo. The specific epithet megacarpa means "big fruit".

== Description ==
Hopea megacarpa grows just below the canopy, up to 15 metres (50 ft) tall, with a trunk diameter of up to 20 cm (8 in). The bark is smooth. The leathery leaves are lanceolate to ovate and measure up to 12 cm (5 in) long. The inflorescences measure up to 3 cm (1 in) long and bear up to three pink flowers. The nuts are egg-shaped and measure up to 1.2 cm (0.5 in) long.

== Distribution and habitat ==
Hopea megacarpa is endemic to Borneo. Its habitat is mixed dipterocarp forests.

== Conservation ==
Hopea megacarpa has been assessed as endangered on the IUCN Red List. It is threatened by logging activities. In Kalimantan, the species occurs in protected areas.
