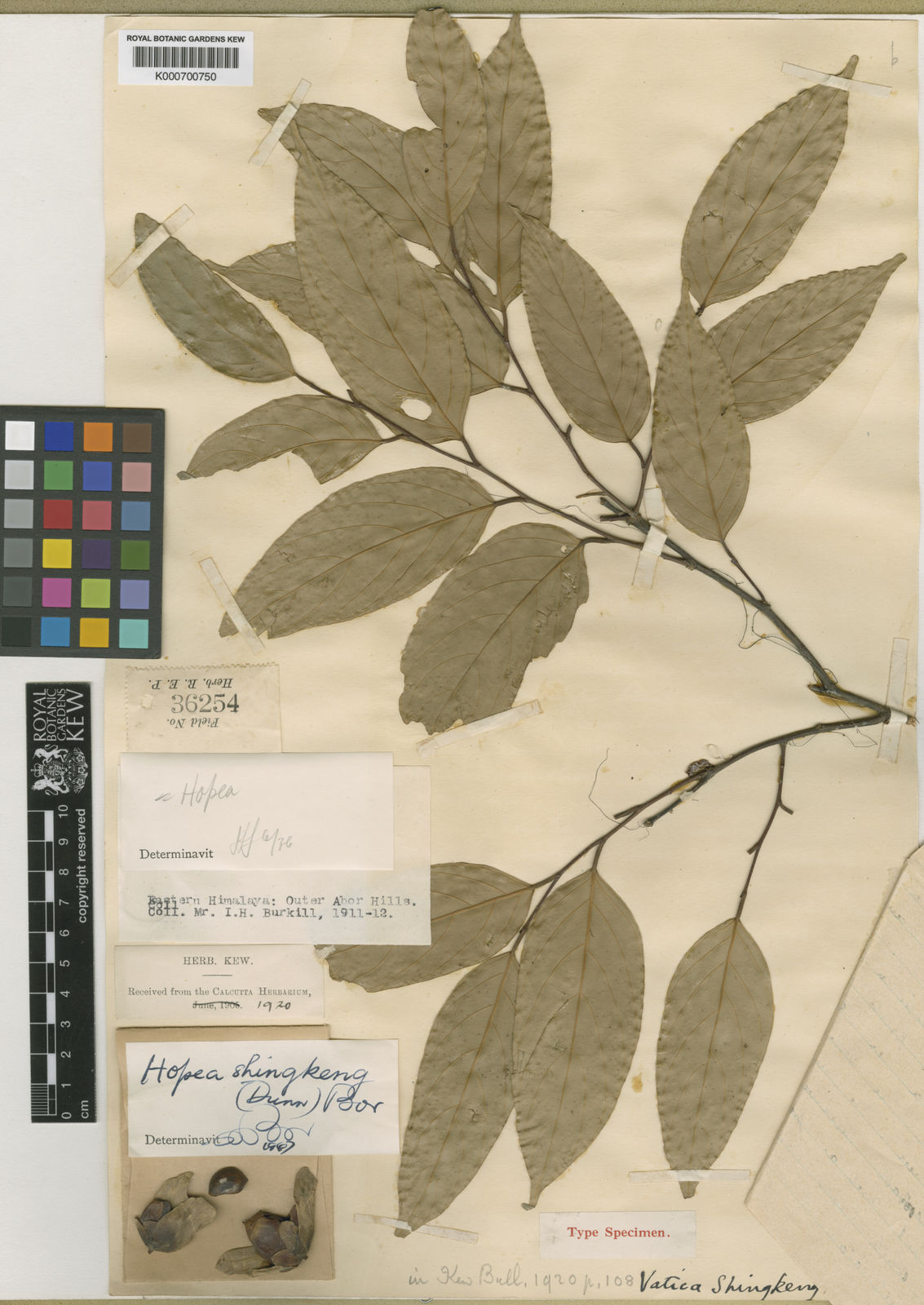

Conservation status
- Extinct (IUCN 3.1)

Scientific classification
- Kingdom: Plantae
- Clade: Tracheophytes
- Clade: Angiosperms
- Clade: Eudicots
- Clade: Rosids
- Order: Malvales
- Family: Dipterocarpaceae
- Genus: Hopea
- Species: †H. shingkeng

Binomial name
- †Hopea shingkeng (Dunn) Borr

Synonyms
- Vatica shingkeng Dunn

= Hopea shingkeng =

Extinct species of tree

Hopea shingkeng was a species of plant in the family Dipterocarpaceae. It was endemic to the eastern Himalayan region of India.

"Flora of China" reports the species from southeast Tibet. Nevertheless, the reported elevational range (300–600 metres (980–1,970 ft)) makes this record suspect. The species is not listed among the protected plants of China.

== Taxonomy ==
=== Homotypic Synonyms ===
- Vatica shingkeng (Dunn)

== Distribution and habitat ==
Its natural habitat was the Eastern Himalayas, now declared a biodiversity hotspot. This covers Bhutan and the Indian provinces of Sikkim and Arunachal Pradesh.
