= Hopea thorelii =

Conservation status
- Endangered (IUCN 3.1)

Scientific classification
- Kingdom: Plantae
- Clade: Tracheophytes
- Clade: Angiosperms
- Clade: Eudicots
- Clade: Rosids
- Order: Malvales
- Family: Dipterocarpaceae
- Genus: Hopea
- Species: H. thorelii

Binomial name
- Hopea thorelii Pierre

Species of tree

Hopea thorelii is a species of flowering plant in the family Dipterocarpaceae. It is tree native to Cambodia, Laos, and Thailand. It is a small tree, growing up to 15 meters tall. It grows in lowland evergreen forest in the Mekong river valley up to 300 meters elevation.

The species was described by Jean Baptiste Louis Pierre in 1891. The species is named after the French botanist Clovis Thorel.
