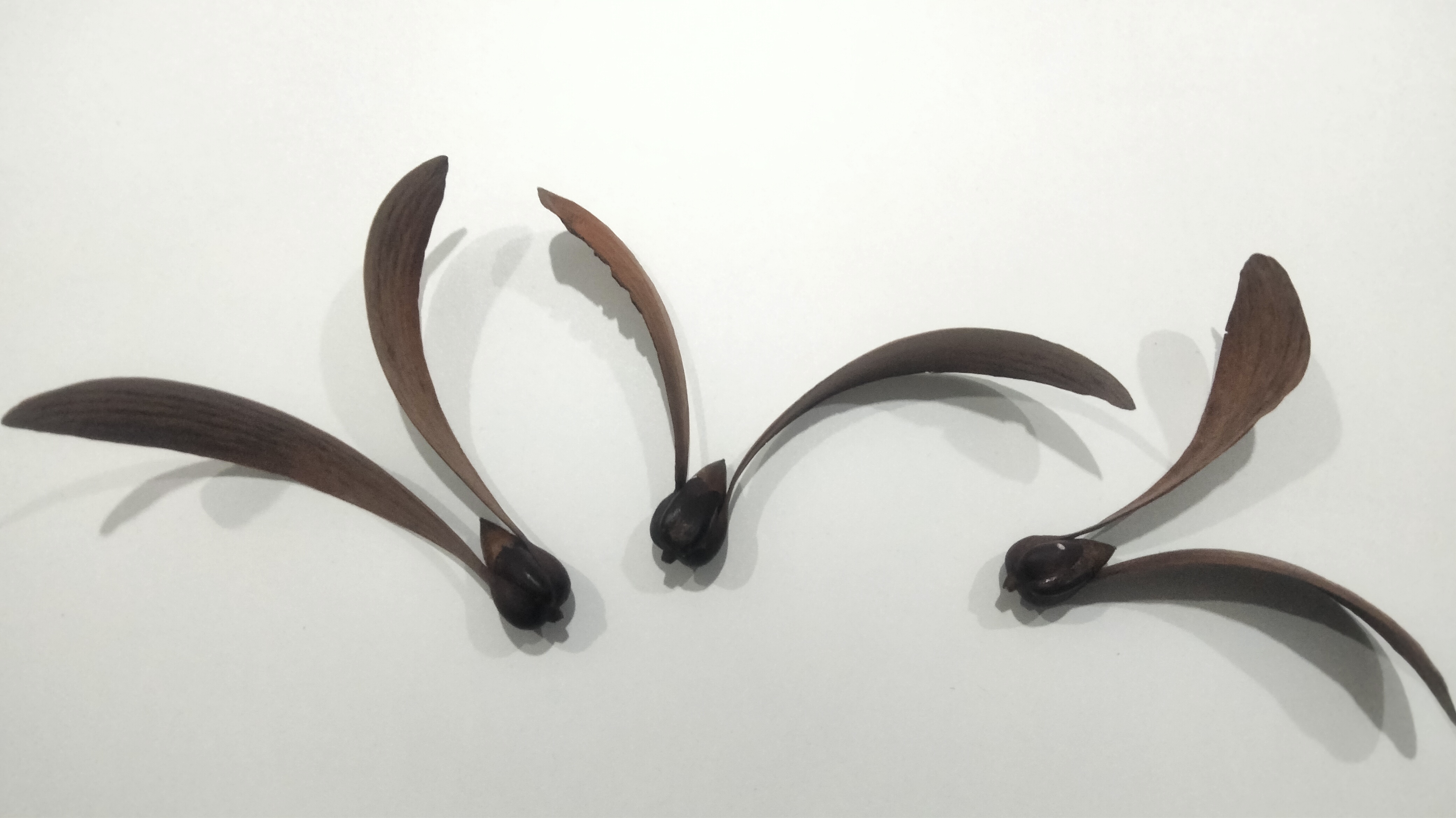
- Seeds of Hopea nervosa

Conservation status
- Least Concern (IUCN 3.1)

Scientific classification
- Kingdom: Plantae
- Clade: Tracheophytes
- Clade: Angiosperms
- Clade: Eudicots
- Clade: Rosids
- Order: Malvales
- Family: Dipterocarpaceae
- Genus: Hopea
- Species: H. nervosa

Binomial name
- Hopea nervosa King

= Hopea nervosa =

Species of tree

Hopea nervosa is a species of flowering plant in the family Dipterocarpaceae. It is found in Sumatra, Peninsular Malaysia and Borneo.
