= Hopea reynosoi =

Conservation status
- Critically Endangered (IUCN 3.1)

Scientific classification
- Kingdom: Plantae
- Clade: Tracheophytes
- Clade: Angiosperms
- Clade: Eudicots
- Clade: Rosids
- Order: Malvales
- Family: Dipterocarpaceae
- Genus: Hopea
- Species: H. reynosoi

Binomial name
- Hopea reynosoi H.G.Gut., Rojo & Madulid

Species of flowering plant

Hopea reynosoi is a species of flowering plant in the family Dipterocarpaceae. It is a tree endemic to the Philippines. It is a small tree, up to 15 meters tall, which is known from a single location in Balangiga, Eastern Samar, where it grows in lowland rain forest. The IUCN Red List assesses the species as critically endangered.

The species was first described by Hermes G. Gutiérrez, Justo P. Rojo, and Domingo A. Madulid in 2010.
