= Hopea pterygota =

Conservation status
- Least Concern (IUCN 3.1)

Scientific classification
- Kingdom: Plantae
- Clade: Embryophytes
- Clade: Tracheophytes
- Clade: Angiosperms
- Clade: Eudicots
- Clade: Rosids
- Order: Malvales
- Family: Dipterocarpaceae
- Genus: Hopea
- Species: H. pterygota

Binomial name
- Hopea pterygota P.S.Ashton

Species of tree

Hopea pterygota is a tree in the family Dipterocarpaceae, native to Borneo. The specific epithet pterygota means "winged", referring to the fruit.

== Description ==
Hopea pterygota grows up to 10 metres (30 ft) tall, with a trunk diameter of up to 10 cm (4 in). The bark is smooth. The leathery leaves are lanceolate to oblong and measure up to 28 cm (11 in) long. The nuts are egg-shaped and measure up to 0.7 cm (0.3 in) long.

== Distribution and habitat ==
Hopea pterygota is endemic to Borneo. Its habitat is dipterocarp forests, at elevations of 700–800 m (2,300–2,600 ft).
