= Hopea ferruginea =

Conservation status
- Vulnerable (IUCN 3.1)

Scientific classification
- Kingdom: Plantae
- Clade: Tracheophytes
- Clade: Angiosperms
- Clade: Eudicots
- Clade: Rosids
- Order: Malvales
- Family: Dipterocarpaceae
- Genus: Hopea
- Species: H. ferruginea

Binomial name
- Hopea ferruginea Parijs

Species of tree

Hopea ferruginea is a species of flowering plant in the family Dipterocarpaceae. It is a tree native to Borneo, Peninsular Malaysia, and Sumatra. It is a large tree, which can grow up to 41 metres tall with a trunk diameter up to 59 cm. It grows in lowland and hill rain forest up to 750 metres elevation. The species is threatened by habitat loss from timber harvesting and expansion of agriculture, plantations, and settlements. The IUCN Red List assesses the species as Vulnerable.
