= Rubroshorea retusa =

Conservation status
- Vulnerable (IUCN 3.1)

Scientific classification
- Kingdom: Plantae
- Clade: Tracheophytes
- Clade: Angiosperms
- Clade: Eudicots
- Clade: Rosids
- Order: Malvales
- Family: Dipterocarpaceae
- Genus: Rubroshorea
- Species: R. retusa

Binomial name
- Rubroshorea retusa (Meijer) P.S.Ashton & J.Heck.

Synonyms
- Shorea retusa Meijer

Species of flowering plant

Rubroshorea retusa is a species of tree in the family Dipterocarpaceae. It is endemic to Borneo.

The species was first described as Shorea retusa by Willem Meijer in 1963. The specific epithet retusa means 'notched', referring to the apex of the leaf. In 2022 Peter Shaw Ashton and Jacqueline Heckenhauer placed the species in genus Rubroshorea as R. retusa.

== Description ==
Rubroshorea retusa grows up to 40 metres (130 ft) tall, with a trunk diameter of up to 84 cm (3 ft), and featuring buttresses. The brown to greyish bark is fissured. The leathery leaves are elliptic and measure up to 9 cm (3.5 in) long. The inflorescences bear yellow flowers.

== Distribution and habitat ==
Rubroshorea retusa is endemic to Borneo. Its habitat is in kerangas (or heath) forests.

== Conservation ==
Shorea retusa has been assessed as vulnerable on the IUCN Red List. It is threatened by conversion of land for palm oil and other tree plantations. It is also threatened by logging for its timber and human settlement, including road construction. The species does occur in a number of protected areas, particularly in Sarawak.
