= Rubroshorea venulosa =

Conservation status
- Least Concern (IUCN 3.1)

Scientific classification
- Kingdom: Plantae
- Clade: Embryophytes
- Clade: Tracheophytes
- Clade: Angiosperms
- Clade: Eudicots
- Clade: Rosids
- Order: Malvales
- Family: Dipterocarpaceae
- Genus: Rubroshorea
- Species: R. venulosa

Binomial name
- Rubroshorea venulosa (G.H.S.Wood ex Meijer) P.S.Ashton & J.Heck.

Synonyms
- Shorea venulosa G.H.S.Wood ex Meijer

Species of tree

Rubroshorea venulosa is a species of tree in the family Dipterocarpaceae which is native to Borneo.

The species was first described as Shorea venulosa in 1963. The specific epithet venulosa means 'small veins', referring to the leaf. In 2022 Peter Shaw Ashton and Jacqueline Heckenhauer placed the species in genus Rubroshorea as R. venulosa.

== Description ==
Rubroshorea venulosa grows up to 55 metres (180 ft) tall, with a trunk diameter of up to 1.3 m (4 ft). It has buttresses up to 3 m (10 ft) tall. The dark brown bark is fissured and becomes flaky. The leathery leaves are ovate and measure up to 10 cm (4 in) long. The inflorescences bear pink flowers.

== Distribution and habitat ==
Rubroshorea venulosa is endemic to Borneo. Its habitat is lowland and lower mountain kerangas forests at elevations of 1,000–1,600 m (3,300–5,200 ft).
