= Rubroshorea fallax =

Conservation status
- Least Concern (IUCN 3.1)

Scientific classification
- Kingdom: Plantae
- Clade: Tracheophytes
- Clade: Angiosperms
- Clade: Eudicots
- Clade: Rosids
- Order: Malvales
- Family: Dipterocarpaceae
- Genus: Rubroshorea
- Species: R. fallax

Binomial name
- Rubroshorea fallax (Meijer) P.S.Ashton & J.Heck.

Synonyms
- Shorea fallax Meijer; Shorea oleosa Meijer

Species of flowering plant

Rubroshorea fallax is a tree in the family Dipterocarpaceae, which is endemic to Borneo.

The species was first described as Shorea fallax by Willem Meijer in 1963. The specific epithet fallax means "deceptive" and refers to the species initially being considered to be Shorea scaberrima. In 2022 Peter Shaw Ashton and Jaqueline Heckenhauer placed the species in the genus Rubroshorea as R. fallax.

== Description ==
Rubroshorea fallax grows up to 50 metres (160 ft) tall, with a trunk diameter of up to 1.3 m (4 ft). It has buttresses up to 2 m (7 ft) tall. The brown bark is flaky and cracked. The leathery leaves are ovate to oblong and measure up to 24 cm (9 in) long. The inflorescences measure up to 22 cm (9 in) long and bear up to seven yellow flowers.

== Distribution and habitat ==
Rubroshorea fallax is endemic to Borneo. Its habitat is mixed dipterocarp forests, to elevations of 500 m (1,600 ft).

== Conservation ==
Shorea fallax has been assessed as least concern on the IUCN Red List. However, in Kalimantan it is threatened by conversion of land and by logging for its timber. The species does occur in a number of protected areas in Sabah and Sarawak.
