= Rubroshorea coriacea =

Conservation status
- Near Threatened (IUCN 3.1)

Scientific classification
- Kingdom: Plantae
- Clade: Tracheophytes
- Clade: Angiosperms
- Clade: Eudicots
- Clade: Rosids
- Order: Malvales
- Family: Dipterocarpaceae
- Genus: Rubroshorea
- Species: R. coriacea

Binomial name
- Rubroshorea coriacea (Burck) P.S.Ashton & J.Heck.

Synonyms
- Shorea coriacea Burck

Species of flowering plant

Rubroshorea coriacea is a tree in the family Dipterocarpaceae, native to Borneo.

The species was first described as Shorea coriacea by William Burck in 1887. The specific epithet coriacea means 'leathery' and refers to the leaves. In 2022 Peter Shaw Ashton and Jacqueline Heckenhauer placed the species in genus Rubroshorea as R. coriacea.

== Description ==
Rubroshorea coriacea grows up to 50 metres (160 ft) tall, with a trunk diameter of up to 1.4 m (5 ft). It has buttresses measuring up to 1.5 m (5 ft) tall. The dark brown bark is flaky and fissured. The leathery leaves are ovate and measure up to 15 cm (6 in) long. The inflorescences measure up to 14 cm (6 in) long and bear up to ten pink flowers. The nuts are egg-shaped and measure up to 1.8 cm (1 in) long.

== Distribution and habitat ==
Rubroshorea coriacea is endemic to Borneo. Its habitat is kerangas and mixed dipterocarp forests up to 1,200 m (4,000 ft) elevation.

== Conservation ==
Shorea coriacea has been assessed as near threatened on the IUCN Red List. It is threatened by agriculture, mining, road and village development and by logging for its timber. However, the species does occur in a number of protected areas in Sabah and Sarawak.
