= Rubroshorea scabrida =

Conservation status
- Near Threatened (IUCN 3.1)

Scientific classification
- Kingdom: Plantae
- Clade: Embryophytes
- Clade: Tracheophytes
- Clade: Angiosperms
- Clade: Eudicots
- Clade: Rosids
- Order: Malvales
- Family: Dipterocarpaceae
- Genus: Rubroshorea
- Species: R. scabrida

Binomial name
- Rubroshorea scabrida (Symington) P.S.Ashton & J.Heck.

Synonyms
- Shorea scabrida Symington

Species of tree

Rubroshorea scabrida is a tree in the family Dipterocarpaceae which is native to Borneo and eastern Sumatra.

The species was first described as Shorea scabrida by Colin Fraser Symington in 1935. The specific epithet scabrida means 'rough', referring to the indumentum. In 2022 Peter Shaw Ashton and Jacqueline Heckenhauer placed the species in genus Rubroshorea as R. scabrida.

== Description ==
Rubroshorea scabrida grows up to 45 metres (150 ft) tall, with a trunk diameter of up to 1 m (3 ft). It has buttresses up to 1.5 m (5 ft) tall. The bark is fissured. The leathery leaves are elliptic to obovate and measure up to 9 cm (4 in) long. The inflorescences bear cream flowers, pink at their base.

== Distribution and habitat ==
Rubroshorea scabrida is native to Borneo and Sumatra. Its habitat is kerangas forests, swamp forests or mixed dipterocarp forests to elevations of 1,200 m (4,000 ft).

== Conservation ==
Rubroshorea scabrida has been assessed as near threatened on the IUCN Red List. It is threatened by land conversion for agriculture. It is also threatened by logging for its timber, including the construction of logging roads. Mining activities and fires pose additional risks. R. scabrida does occur in a number of protected areas.
