= Rubroshorea macroptera =

Conservation status
- Least Concern (IUCN 3.1)

Scientific classification
- Kingdom: Plantae
- Clade: Tracheophytes
- Clade: Angiosperms
- Clade: Eudicots
- Clade: Rosids
- Order: Malvales
- Family: Dipterocarpaceae
- Genus: Rubroshorea
- Species: R. macroptera

Binomial name
- Rubroshorea macroptera (Dyer) P.S.Ashton & J.Heck.

Synonyms
- Shorea auriculata Scort. ex Foxw.; Shorea baillonii F.Heim; Shorea macroptera Dyer (1874) (basionym); Shorea macroptera subsp. baillonii (F.Heim) P.S.Ashton; Shorea macroptera subsp. macroptera; Shorea macroptera subsp. macropterifolia P.S.Ashton; Shorea macroptera subsp. sandakanensis (Symington) P.S.Ashton; Shorea sandakanensis Symington

Species of flowering plant

Rubroshorea macroptera (commonly known, along with some other dipterocarp species, as light red meranti) is a species of flowering plant in the family Dipterocarpaceae. It is a tree native to Borneo, Sumatra, Peninsular Malaysia, and Peninsular Thailand. It is a large tree, up to 40 or 50 metres tall, which grows in lowland mixed dipterocarp rain forests on clay soils over sedimentary or igneous rocks.

The species was first described as Shorea macroptera by William Turner Thiselton-Dyer in 1874. In 2022 Peter Shaw Ashton and Jacqueline Heckenhauer placed the species in genus Rubroshorea as R. macroptera.
