= Rubroshorea selanica =

Conservation status
- Vulnerable (IUCN 3.1)

Scientific classification
- Kingdom: Plantae
- Clade: Tracheophytes
- Clade: Angiosperms
- Clade: Eudicots
- Clade: Rosids
- Order: Malvales
- Family: Dipterocarpaceae
- Genus: Rubroshorea
- Species: R. selanica

Binomial name
- Rubroshorea selanica (Valmont) P.S.Ashton & J.Heck.

Synonyms
- Dammara selanica Valmont (1791) (basionym); Engelhardia selanica (Valmont) Blume; Hopea selanica (Valmont) Wight & Arn.; Shorea selanica (Valmont) Blume; Shorea selanica var. latifolia Blume; Shorea selanica var. obtusa Burck; Unona selanica (Valmont) DC.; Xylopia orientalis Spreng.

Species of tree

Rubroshorea selanica is a species of flowering plant in the family Dipterocarpaceae. It is a tree endemic to the Maluku Islands in Indonesia, where it is a canopy tree growing in lowland rain forest. It is a critically endangered species threatened by habitat loss.

The species was first described as Dammara selanica by Jacques-Christophe Valmont de Bomare in 1791, and has several synonyms. In 2022 Peter Shaw Ashton and Jacqueline Heckenhauer placed the species in genus Rubroshorea as R. selanica.
