= Rubroshorea acuminata =

Conservation status
- Least Concern (IUCN 3.1)

Scientific classification
- Kingdom: Plantae
- Clade: Tracheophytes
- Clade: Angiosperms
- Clade: Eudicots
- Clade: Rosids
- Order: Malvales
- Family: Dipterocarpaceae
- Genus: Rubroshorea
- Species: R. acuminata

Binomial name
- Rubroshorea acuminata (Dyer) P.S.Ashton & J.Heck.

Synonyms
- Shorea acuminata Dyer

Species of tree

Rubroshorea acuminata (called, along with some other species in the genus Rubroshorea, dark red meranti, light red meranti, or sometimes red lauan) is a species of plant in the family Dipterocarpaceae. It is native to Sumatra and Peninsular Malaysia.

== See also ==
- Rubroshorea teysmanniana, a closely related tree in the Philippines more properly known as the red lauan.
- Parashorea macrophylla, the white lauan.
