= Rubroshorea inaequilateralis =

Conservation status
- Endangered (IUCN 3.1)

Scientific classification
- Kingdom: Plantae
- Clade: Embryophytes
- Clade: Tracheophytes
- Clade: Spermatophytes
- Clade: Angiosperms
- Clade: Eudicots
- Clade: Rosids
- Order: Malvales
- Family: Dipterocarpaceae
- Genus: Rubroshorea
- Species: R. inaequilateralis

Binomial name
- Rubroshorea inaequilateralis (Symington) P.S.Ashton & J.Heck.

Synonyms
- Shorea inaequilateralis Symington

Species of tree

Rubroshorea inaequilateralis (called, along with some other species in the genus Rubroshorea, red balau) is a species of tree in the family Dipterocarpaceae. It is endemic to Brunei and Sarawak on the island of Borneo. It grows in peat swamp forest, where it can reach 45 metres tall. It is threatened by habitat loss.

The species was first described as Shorea inaequilateralis by Colin Fraser Symington in 1935. In 2022 Peter Shaw Ashton and Jacqueline Heckenhauer placed the species in genus Rubroshorea as R. inaequilateralis.
