= Rubroshorea pinanga =

Conservation status
- Least Concern (IUCN 3.1)

Scientific classification
- Kingdom: Plantae
- Clade: Tracheophytes
- Clade: Angiosperms
- Clade: Eudicots
- Clade: Rosids
- Order: Malvales
- Family: Dipterocarpaceae
- Genus: Rubroshorea
- Species: R. pinanga

Binomial name
- Rubroshorea pinanga (Scheff.) P.S.Ashton & J.Heck.

Synonyms
- Shorea compressa Burck; Shorea pinanga Scheff.

Species of flowering plant

Rubroshorea pinanga is a tree in the family Dipterocarpaceae, native to Borneo.

The species was first described as Shorea pinanga by Rudolph Scheffer in 1870. The specific epithet pinanga is derived from a local name for the species. In 2022 Peter Shaw Ashton and Jacqueline Heckenhauer placed the species in genus Rubroshorea as R. pinanga.

== Description ==
Rubroshorea pinanga grows up to 45 metres (150 ft) tall, with a trunk diameter of up to 1.3 m (4 ft). It has buttresses up to 1.5 m (5 ft) tall. The brown to pinkish bark is initially smooth, later becoming cracked and flaky. The leathery leaves are elliptic to ovate and measure up to 24 cm (9 in) long. The inflorescences bear pink flowers.

== Distribution and habitat ==
Rubroshorea pinanga is endemic to Borneo. Its habitat is mixed dipterocarp forests, to elevations of 900 m (3,000 ft).

== Conservation ==
Shorea pinanga has been assessed as least concern on the IUCN Red List. Although the species population is declining, it is still considered abundant. The species is used for its timber. It occurs in a number of protected areas.
