= Rubroshorea pachyphylla =

Conservation status
- Endangered (IUCN 3.1)

Scientific classification
- Kingdom: Plantae
- Clade: Tracheophytes
- Clade: Angiosperms
- Clade: Eudicots
- Clade: Rosids
- Order: Malvales
- Family: Dipterocarpaceae
- Genus: Rubroshorea
- Species: R. pachyphylla

Binomial name
- Rubroshorea pachyphylla (Ridl. ex Symington) P.S.Ashton & J.Heck.

Synonyms
- Shorea pachyphylla Ridl. ex Symington

Species of tree

Rubroshorea pachyphylla (called, along with some other dipterocarp species, dark red meranti) is a species of tree in the family Dipterocarpaceae. It is endemic to Borneo and threatened by habitat loss. It grows in peat swamp forests and heath (or kerangas) forests.
