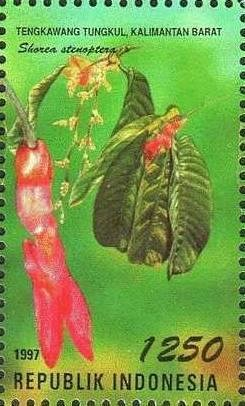
- Shorea stenoptera on a 1997 stamp of Indonesia

Conservation status
- Near Threatened (IUCN 3.1)

Scientific classification
- Kingdom: Plantae
- Clade: Embryophytes
- Clade: Tracheophytes
- Clade: Angiosperms
- Clade: Eudicots
- Clade: Rosids
- Order: Malvales
- Family: Dipterocarpaceae
- Genus: Rubroshorea
- Species: R. stenoptera

Binomial name
- Rubroshorea stenoptera (Burck) P.S.Ashton & J.Heck.

Synonyms
- Shorea gysbertsiana var. scabra Burck; Shorea stenoptera Burck; Shorea stenoptera var. scabra (Burck) M.Hotta; Shorea stenoptera var. stenoptera

= Rubroshorea stenoptera =

Species of tree

Rubroshorea stenoptera, synonym Shorea stenoptera, called light red meranti, is a species of tree in the family Dipterocarpaceae. It is endemic to western Borneo, where it is native to southwestern Sarawak and western Kalimantan. It can grow up to 30 metres tall. It is locally common in patchy lowland heath forest (kerangas) up to 300 metres elevation. It is threatened by habitat loss, and the IUCN Red List assesses the species as near threatened.

The species was described by William Burck in 1886. In 2022 Peter Shaw Ashton and Jaqueline Heckenhauer placed the species in the newly-described genus Rubroshorea as R. stenoptera.
