= Rubroshorea macrantha =

- Seed of Rubroshorea macrantha

Conservation status
- Critically Endangered (IUCN 3.1)

Scientific classification
- Kingdom: Plantae
- Clade: Tracheophytes
- Clade: Angiosperms
- Clade: Eudicots
- Clade: Rosids
- Order: Malvales
- Family: Dipterocarpaceae
- Genus: Rubroshorea
- Species: R. macrantha

Binomial name
- Rubroshorea macrantha (Brandis) P.S.Ashton & J.Heck.

Synonyms
- Shorea macrantha Brandis

Species of tree

Rubroshorea macrantha is a species of plant in the family Dipterocarpaceae. It is a tree native to Peninsular Malaysia, eastern Sumatra, and Sarawak in northwestern Borneo.

It is native to lowland areas, including mixed peat swamp forests, freshwater swamp forests, and kerangas, up to 300 meters elevation. It is insect pollinated, and the trees show mass-flowering and mass-fruiting events in cycles of two to seven years. It is threatened by habitat loss. The population is estimated at fewer than 250 individuals, and the IUCN assesses the species as critically endangered.

The species was first described as Shorea macrantha by Dietrich Brandis in 1895. In 2022 Peter Shaw Ashton and Jacqueline Heckenhauer placed the species in genus Rubroshorea as R. macrantha.
