= Rubroshorea albida =

Conservation status
- Vulnerable (IUCN 3.1)

Scientific classification
- Kingdom: Plantae
- Clade: Tracheophytes
- Clade: Angiosperms
- Clade: Eudicots
- Clade: Rosids
- Order: Malvales
- Family: Dipterocarpaceae
- Genus: Rubroshorea
- Species: R. albida

Binomial name
- Rubroshorea albida (Symington) P.S.Ashton & J.Heck.

Synonyms
- Shorea albida Symington

Species of tree native to Borneo

Rubroshorea albida (called, along with some other species in the genera Rubroshorea and Shorea, light red meranti) is a species of tree in the family Dipterocarpaceae. It is endemic to Borneo.

The species was first described as Shorea albida by Colin Fraser Symington in 1935. In 2022 Peter Shaw Ashton and Jacqueline Heckenhauer placed the species in genus Rubroshorea as R. albida.

== Description ==
Rubroshorea albida can grow up to 30 meters high.

== Range and habitat ==
Rubroshorea albida is found in Brunei, Sarawak state of Malaysia, and the Indonesian province of West Kalimantan. The largest subpopulation is in Brunei, and its range is limited in West Kalimantan.

Rubroshorea albida can be a dominant canopy tree in peat swamp forests. It is also found in lower montane forests and heath forests.

== Conservation ==
The species' Brunei habitat is not threatened, and its population in the country is considered stable. It is found in four protected areas in Sarawak, but outside those areas its population continues declining from deforestation and fire. The species' population in Indonesia is estimated to have declined by 80% over the last three generations, and is expected to decline further as a result of habitat loss. Its conservation status is assessed as vulnerable.
