= Red lauan =

Red lauan or red lawaan is a common name for several plants and may refer to:

- Shorea negrosensis, endemic to the Philippines
- Shorea teysmanniana, now Rubroshorea teysmanniana, native to Sumatra, Borneo, and peninsular Malaysia
