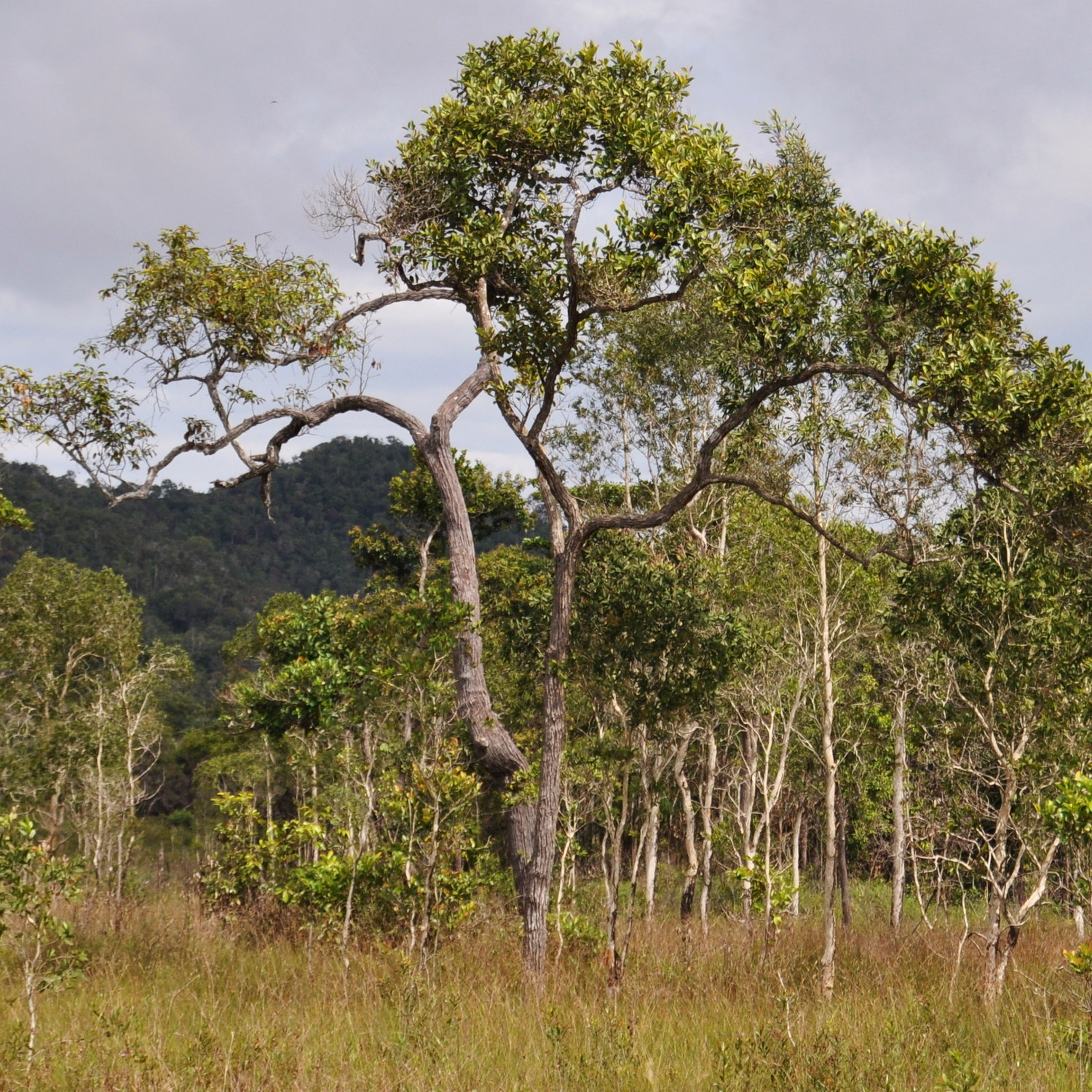
- Rubroshorea balangeran on Belitung island, Indonesia

Scientific classification
- Kingdom: Plantae
- Clade: Tracheophytes
- Clade: Angiosperms
- Clade: Eudicots
- Clade: Rosids
- Order: Malvales
- Family: Dipterocarpaceae
- Tribe: Shoreae
- Genus: Rubroshorea (Meijer) P.S.Ashton & J.Heck.

Species
- 71; see text

= Rubroshorea =

Genus of flowering plants

Rubroshorea is a genus of flowering plants in the family Dipterocarpaceae. It includes 71 species of trees native to Borneo, Caroline Islands, Java, Malaya, Maluku, the Philippines, Sumatra and Thailand.

The genus corresponds to the Red meranti group in the Dipterocarp timber classification system.

== Species ==
As of September 2024, Plants of the World Online accepted the following 71 species:

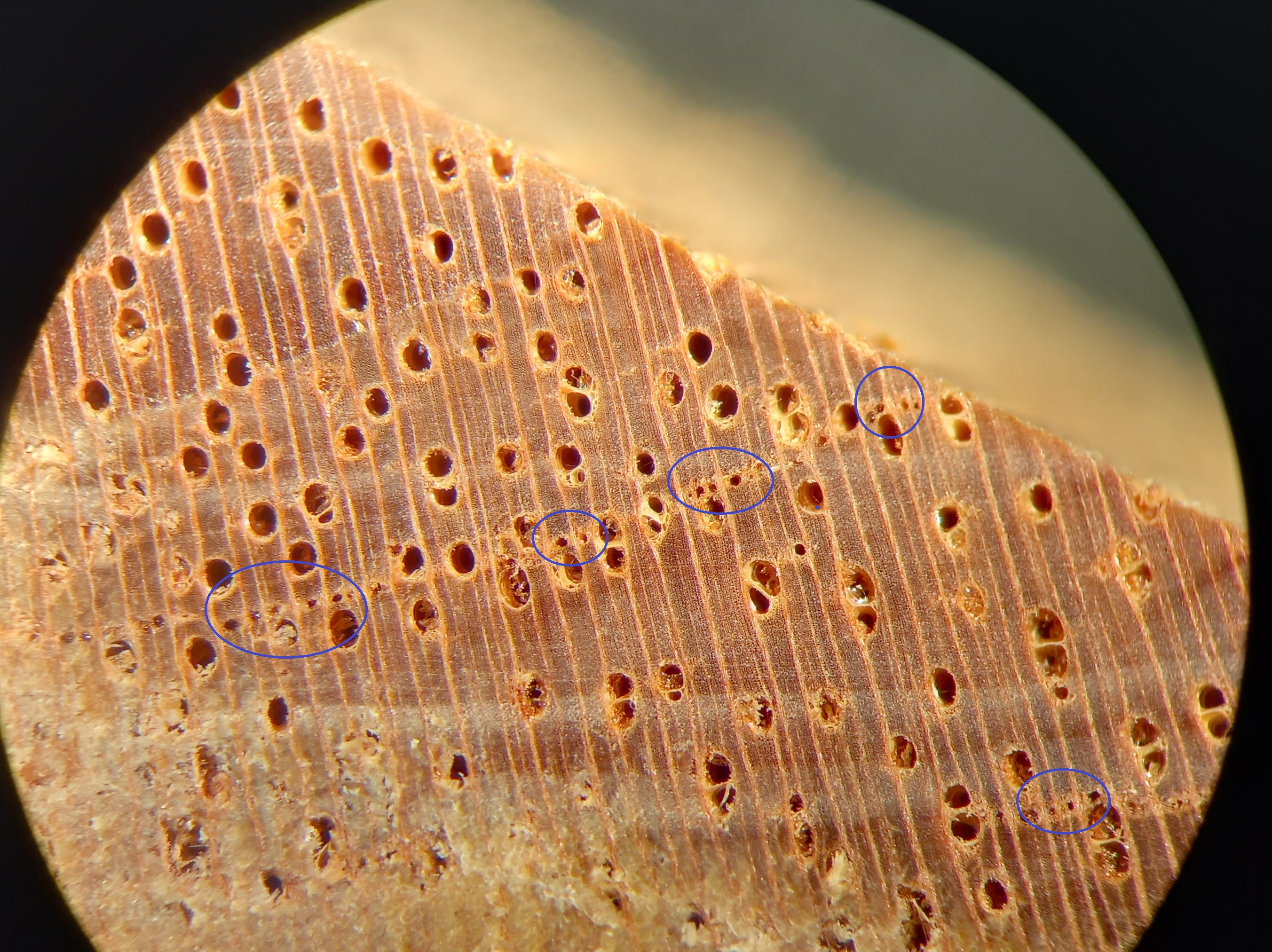
All species of the Rubroshorea genus possess distinct axial resin canals in their xylem.

- Rubroshorea acuminata (Dyer) P.S.Ashton & J.Heck.
- Rubroshorea acuta (P.S.Ashton) P.S.Ashton & J.Heck.
- Rubroshorea albida (Symington) P.S.Ashton & J.Heck.
- Rubroshorea almon (Foxw.) P.S.Ashton & J.Heck.
- Rubroshorea amplexicaulis (P.S.Ashton) P.S.Ashton & J.Heck.
- Rubroshorea andulensis (P.S.Ashton) P.S.Ashton & J.Heck.
- Rubroshorea argentifolia (Symington) P.S.Ashton & J.Heck.
- Rubroshorea balangeran (Korth.) P.S.Ashton & J.Heck.
- Rubroshorea beccariana (Burck) P.S.Ashton & J.Heck.
- Rubroshorea bullata (P.S.Ashton) P.S.Ashton & J.Heck.
- Rubroshorea carapae (P.S.Ashton) P.S.Ashton & J.Heck.
- Rubroshorea coriacea (Burck) P.S.Ashton & J.Heck.
- Rubroshorea curtisii (Dyer ex King) P.S.Ashton & J.Heck.
- Rubroshorea dasyphylla (Foxw.) P.S.Ashton & J.Heck.
- Rubroshorea dispar (P.S.Ashton) P.S.Ashton & J.Heck.
- Rubroshorea elliptica (Burck) P.S.Ashton & J.Heck.
- Rubroshorea fallax (Meijer) P.S.Ashton & J.Heck.
- Rubroshorea ferruginea (Dyer ex Brandis) P.S.Ashton & J.Heck.
- Rubroshorea flaviflora (G.H.S.Wood ex P.S.Ashton) P.S.Ashton & J.Heck.
- Rubroshorea flemmichii (Symington) P.S.Ashton & J.Heck.
- Rubroshorea foraminifera (P.S.Ashton) P.S.Ashton & J.Heck.
- Rubroshorea hemsleyana (King) P.S.Ashton & J.Heck.
- Rubroshorea inaequilateralis (Symington) P.S.Ashton & J.Heck.
- Rubroshorea johorensis (Foxw.) P.S.Ashton & J.Heck.
- Rubroshorea kunstleri (King) P.S.Ashton & J.Heck.
- Rubroshorea lepidota (Korth.) P.S.Ashton & J.Heck.
- Rubroshorea leprosula (Miq.) P.S.Ashton & J.Heck.
- Rubroshorea macrantha (Brandis) P.S.Ashton & J.Heck.
- Rubroshorea macrophylla (de Vriese) P.S.Ashton & J.Heck.
- Rubroshorea macroptera (Dyer) P.S.Ashton & J.Heck.
- Rubroshorea mecistopteryx (Ridl.) P.S.Ashton & J.Heck.
- Rubroshorea monticola (P.S.Ashton) P.S.Ashton & J.Heck.
- Rubroshorea myrionerva (Symington ex P.S.Ashton) P.S.Ashton & J.Heck.
- Rubroshorea negrosensis (Foxw.) P.S.Ashton & J.Heck.
- Rubroshorea ovalis (Korth.) P.S.Ashton & J.Heck.
- Rubroshorea ovata (Dyer ex Brandis) P.S.Ashton & J.Heck.
- Rubroshorea pachyphylla (Ridl. ex Symington) P.S.Ashton & J.Heck.
- Rubroshorea palembanica (Miq.) P.S.Ashton & J.Heck.
- Rubroshorea pallidifolia (P.S.Ashton) P.S.Ashton & J.Heck.
- Rubroshorea palosapis (Blanco) P.S.Ashton & J.Heck.
- Rubroshorea parvifolia (Dyer) P.S.Ashton & J.Heck.
- Rubroshorea parvistipulata (F.Heim) P.S.Ashton & J.Heck.
- Rubroshorea pauciflora (King) P.S.Ashton & J.Heck.
- Rubroshorea pilosa (P.S.Ashton) P.S.Ashton & J.Heck.
- Rubroshorea pinanga (Scheff.) P.S.Ashton & J.Heck.
- Rubroshorea platycarpa (F.Heim) P.S.Ashton & J.Heck.
- Rubroshorea platyclados (Slooten ex Endert) P.S.Ashton & J.Heck.
- Rubroshorea polysperma (Blanco) P.S.Ashton & J.Heck.
- Rubroshorea praestans (P.S.Ashton) P.S.Ashton & J.Heck.
- Rubroshorea pubistyla (P.S.Ashton) P.S.Ashton & J.Heck.
- Rubroshorea quadrinervis (Slooten) P.S.Ashton & J.Heck.
- Rubroshorea retusa (Meijer) P.S.Ashton & J.Heck.
- Rubroshorea revoluta (P.S.Ashton) P.S.Ashton & J.Heck.
- Rubroshorea rotundifolia (P.S.Ashton) P.S.Ashton & J.Heck.
- Rubroshorea rubella (P.S.Ashton) P.S.Ashton & J.Heck.
- Rubroshorea rubra (P.S.Ashton) P.S.Ashton & J.Heck.
- Rubroshorea rugosa (F.Heim) P.S.Ashton & J.Heck.
- Rubroshorea sagittata (P.S.Ashton) P.S.Ashton & J.Heck.
- Rubroshorea scaberrima (Burck) P.S.Ashton & J.Heck.
- Rubroshorea scabrida (Symington) P.S.Ashton & J.Heck.
- Rubroshorea selanica (Valmont) P.S.Ashton & J.Heck.
- Rubroshorea singkawang (Miq.) P.S.Ashton & J.Heck.
- Rubroshorea slootenii (P.S.Ashton) P.S.Ashton & J.Heck.
- Rubroshorea smithiana (Symington) P.S.Ashton & J.Heck.
- Rubroshorea splendida (de Vriese) P.S.Ashton & J.Heck.
- Rubroshorea stenoptera (Burck) P.S.Ashton & J.Heck.
- Rubroshorea teysmanniana (Dyer ex Brandis) P.S.Ashton & J.Heck.
- Rubroshorea uliginosa (Foxw.) P.S.Ashton & J.Heck.
- Rubroshorea venulosa (G.H.S.Wood ex Meijer) P.S.Ashton & J.Heck.
- Rubroshorea waltoni (G.H.S.Wood ex Meijer) P.S.Ashton & J.Heck.
- Rubroshorea woodii (P.S.Ashton) P.S.Ashton & J.Heck.
