= Rubroshorea ferruginea =

Conservation status
- Vulnerable (IUCN 3.1)

Scientific classification
- Kingdom: Plantae
- Clade: Tracheophytes
- Clade: Angiosperms
- Clade: Eudicots
- Clade: Rosids
- Order: Malvales
- Family: Dipterocarpaceae
- Genus: Rubroshorea
- Species: R. ferruginea

Binomial name
- Rubroshorea ferruginea (Dyer ex Brandis) P.S.Ashton & J.Heck.

Synonyms
- Shorea ferruginea Dyer ex Brandis

Species of flowering plant

Rubroshorea ferruginea is a tree in the family Dipterocarpaceae which is native to Borneo.

The species was first described as Shorea ferruginea in 1894. The specific epithet ferruginea means 'rust-coloured', referring to the leaf when dry. In 2022, Peter Shaw Ashton and Jacqueline Heckenhauer placed the species in genus Rubroshorea as R. ferruginea.

== Description ==
Rubroshorea ferruginea grows up to 45 m (150 ft) tall, with a trunk diameter of up to 1.6 m (5 ft). It has buttresses up to 3.5 m (11 ft) tall. The initially smooth bark becomes fissured and flaky. The leathery leaves are oblong to ovate or lanceolate and measure up to 15 cm (6 in) long. The inflorescences measure up to 22 cm (9 in) long and bear up to 14 flowers.

== Distribution and habitat ==
Rubroshorea ferruginea is endemic to Borneo. Its habitat is dipterocarp forests up to 1,100 m (3,600 ft) elevation.

== Conservation ==
Shorea ferruginea has been assessed as vulnerable on the IUCN Red List. It is threatened by conversion of land for intensive agriculture, especially palm oil plantations. It is also threatened by logging for its timber. Coal mining occurs near part of the species' habitat in Kalimantan. The increasing frequency and severity of wildfires threatens the species. Shorea ferruginea does occur in a number of protected areas.
