= Shorea guiso =

Conservation status
- Vulnerable (IUCN 3.1)

Scientific classification
- Kingdom: Plantae
- Clade: Tracheophytes
- Clade: Angiosperms
- Clade: Eudicots
- Clade: Rosids
- Order: Malvales
- Family: Dipterocarpaceae
- Genus: Shorea
- Species: S. guiso

Binomial name
- Shorea guiso (Blanco) Blume

Synonyms
- Isoptera burckii Boerl.; Mocanera guiso Blanco; Shorea vidaliana Brandis

Species of tree native to Southeast Asia

Guijo (Shorea guiso) is a species of plant in the family Dipterocarpaceae. It is a tree found in Cambodia, Laos, Vietnam, Sumatra, Peninsular Malaysia, Borneo and the Philippines. The name guijo is a Philippine Spanish word derived from the Tagalog gihò. This is also sometimes known as red balan or red balau sharing its name with Rubroshorea balangeran. Other local names include yamban-yamban in Zambales and taralai in Tarlac.

== Description ==
Shorea guiso is a tree that can grow up to 30 m (98.43 ft) to 40 m (131.23 ft) and its diameter can measure up to 1.80 m (5.91 ft) or more. Guijo can be differentiated by the color of its branchlets, which are dark. Primarily, its habitat can be found at low altitudes of the forest, normally inhabiting ridges.

The color of the bark is light reddish brown when it is newly bared. Its weight is usually moderately heavy to heavy and the wood is moderately hard to hard and splitting it can be tough. It has light grayish brown thin sapwood that can be clearly determined from the heartwood, which has a light ashy brown to brown in color, with occasionally reddish tint.

The shape of the leaves ranges from lanceolate or ovate lanceolate to oblong with nerves having at least 15 pairs. The leaf is also acute with an accuminate apex and a rounded base, and a glabrous or nearly glabrous skin.

== Importance ==
Guijo is generally used for construction, furniture making, ship and boat farming, and other uses that needing hard wood with aesthetically pleasing grain. It is also used as a decking product due to its resistance to rot and insects except termites. Although, guijo is not long-lasting when exposed gravely to weather or when it touches the ground. Thus, it is only used when extreme durability is not an issue and material would not be severely exposed. The resin of the tree is used as ingredient for producing varnishes and paints.

In the Philippines, prices of guijo lumber was regulated in 1947 by President Manuel Roxas through Executive Order No. 66. The order sets a ceiling price for guijo lumber and other types of lumber in the Philippines.

== Conservation status ==
In the Philippines, Guijo was abundant in 1921 and it was estimated that 5% of the forests' volume covered it. During those times, it can be found in the provinces or islands of Cagayan, Isabela, Bontoc, Ilocos Norte, Ilocos Sur, Abra, Union, Nueva Vizcaya, Nueva Ecija, Pangasinan, Tarlac, Zambales, Bataan, Pampanga, Bulacan, Rizal, Laguna, Batangas, Tayabas, Camarines, Albay, Sorsogon, Marinduque, Ticao, Mindoro, Masbate, Samar, Leyte, Negros, Capiz, Agusan, Misamis, Davao, Cotabato and Zamboanga.

In 2017, the IUCN Red List website listed Shorea guiso as a vulnerable species but a website called Binhi, a greening program of Energy Development Corporation from the Philippines, listed the species as critically endangered. As of 2018, the species can be found in Southeast Asian places like Luzon (Cagayan to Sorsogon), Mindoro, Panay, Negros, Samar, Leyte, Mindanao, Basilan, Thailand, Malaya, Sumatra and Borneo. Its number decreased due to logging and kaingin or slash-and-burn.
