= Rubroshorea palosapis =

Conservation status
- Least Concern (IUCN 3.1)

Scientific classification
- Kingdom: Plantae
- Clade: Embryophytes
- Clade: Tracheophytes
- Clade: Angiosperms
- Clade: Eudicots
- Clade: Rosids
- Order: Malvales
- Family: Dipterocarpaceae
- Genus: Rubroshorea
- Species: R. palosapis

Binomial name
- Rubroshorea palosapis (Blanco) P.S.Ashton & J.Heck.

Synonyms
- Dipterocarpus palosapis Blanco (1845) (basionym); Hopea squamata Turcz.; Shorea palosapis (Blanco) Merr.; Shorea squamata (Turcz.) Benth. & Hook.f. ex DC.

Species of flowering plant

Rubroshorea palosapis is a flowering plant in the family Dipterocarpaceae. It is commonly called (along with some other species in the genera Rubroshorea and Shorea) Philippine mahogany or white lauan. It is endemic to the Philippines.

The species was first described as Dipterocarpus palosapis by Francisco Manuel Blanco in 1845. In 2022 Peter Shaw Ashton and Jacqueline Heckenhauer placed in the genus Rubroshorea as R. palosapis.
