= Endiandra monothyra subsp. trichophylla =

- Endiandra monothyra subsp. trichophylla herbarium specimen

Conservation status
- Least Concern (NCA)

Scientific classification
- Kingdom: Plantae
- Clade: Tracheophytes
- Clade: Angiosperms
- Clade: Magnoliids
- Order: Laurales
- Family: Lauraceae
- Genus: Endiandra
- Species: E. monothyra
- Subspecies: E. m. subsp. trichophylla

Trinomial name
- Endiandra monothyra subsp. trichophylla B.Hyland

Subspecies of flowering plant

Endiandra monothyra subsp. trichophylla, known as rose walnut, is a subspecies of plant in the family Lauraceae native to Queensland, Australia. It is a rainforest tree, first described in 1989. It has a conservation status of Least concern.

== Description ==
Endiandra monothyra subsp. trichophylla is a tree that can grow up to 25 m (82 ft) in height and 60 cm (24 in) diameter, with a trunk that may be buttressed on older specimens. Petioles average about 8 mm (0.3 in) long. The leaves are generally about 7 cm (2.8 in) long and 3 cm (1.2 in) wide and have 4–6 pairs of lateral veins. They are lanceolate to elliptic, green above and covered with tortuous brown hairs on the lower side. The midrib is depressed on the upper surface of the blade, and domatia are absent.

The inflorescence is a panicle arising from the leaf axils. Flowers are brown externally, greenish inside, and without scent; they have six hairy tepals up to 1.5 mm (0.06 in) long. The fruits are a shiny black ellipsoid drupe, about 3.5 cm (1.4 in) long and 1.5 cm (0.6 in) wide. They contain a single brown seed up to 2.8 cm (1.1 in) long and 1.2 cm (0.5 in) wide.

== Distribution ==
The tree is largely restricted to the Atherton Tableland. It grows in well-developed rainforest, at altitudes from 650 to 800 m (2,130 to 2,620 ft).

== Conservation ==
It is rated as least concern by the Queensland Government under its Nature Conservation Act.
