= Rubroshorea platyclados =

Conservation status
- Near Threatened (IUCN 3.1)

Scientific classification
- Kingdom: Plantae
- Clade: Embryophytes
- Clade: Tracheophytes
- Clade: Angiosperms
- Clade: Eudicots
- Clade: Rosids
- Order: Malvales
- Family: Dipterocarpaceae
- Genus: Rubroshorea
- Species: R. platyclados

Binomial name
- Rubroshorea platyclados (Slooten ex Endert) P.S.Ashton & J.Heck.

Synonyms
- Shorea platyclados Slooten ex Endert

Species of tree

Rubroshorea platyclados, synonym Shorea platyclados, (called, along with some other species in the genus Rubroshorea, dark red meranti) is a species of plant in the family Dipterocarpaceae. It is native to Borneo, Peninsular Malaysia and Sumatra. It is a large emergent tree which can grow more than 50 metres tall. It grows in lowland and montane rain forests in hilly and mountainous areas on deep fertile soils from 180 to 1,800 metres elevation. The species is threatened by habitat loss.

== Conservation ==
Shorea platyclados has been assessed as near threatened on the IUCN Red List. It is threatened by harvesting of its timber, which is prized for its durability. Its habitat is threatened by conversion for residential and agricultural development. The subpopulations in Peninsular Malaysia and Brunei are relatively stable. The species occurs in a number of protected areas, where species loss is curtailed.
