= Endiandra monothyra subsp. monothyra =

- Endiandra monothyra subsp. monothyra herbarium specimen

Conservation status
- Least Concern (NCA)

Scientific classification
- Kingdom: Plantae
- Clade: Tracheophytes
- Clade: Angiosperms
- Clade: Magnoliids
- Order: Laurales
- Family: Lauraceae
- Genus: Endiandra
- Species: E. monothyra B.Hyland
- Subspecies: E. m. subsp. monothyra

Trinomial name
- Endiandra monothyra subsp. monothyra

Subspecies of flowering plant

Endiandra monothyra subsp. monothyra, known as rose walnut, is a subspecies of plant in the family Lauraceae native to Queensland, Australia. It is a rainforest tree, first described in 1989. It has a conservation status of Least concern.

== Description ==
Endiandra monothyra subsp. monothyra is a tree that can grow up to 35 m (115 ft) in height and 80 cm (31 in) diameter, with a trunk that is often buttressed. Petioles average about 9 mm (0.4 in) long. The leaves are generally about 10 cm (3.9 in) long and 5 cm (2.0 in) wide and have 4–9 pairs of lateral veins. They may be lanceolate, elliptic or ovate. They are green on both sides, but the lower surface has a fine covering of pale brown hairs when young. The midrib is depressed on the upper surface of the blade, and domatia are absent.

The inflorescence is a panicle arising from the leaf axils. Flowers are pale brown to green and without scent; they have six tepals up to 1.5 mm (0.06 in) long. The fruits are an ellipsoid drupe, maroon initially and becoming shiny black, about 4 cm (1.6 in) long and 2 cm (0.8 in) wide. They contain a single brown seed up to 3.4 cm (1.3 in) long and 1.5 cm (0.6 in) wide.

== Distribution ==
The tree is widespread in northeast Queensland. It grows in well-developed rainforest on a variety of soil types, but it has a preference for basalt. It occurs at altitudes from 200 to 1,000 m (660 to 3,280 ft).

== Conservation ==
It is rated as least concern by the Queensland Government under its Nature Conservation Act.
