= Rubroshorea pauciflora =

Conservation status
- Near Threatened (IUCN 3.1)

Scientific classification
- Kingdom: Plantae
- Clade: Embryophytes
- Clade: Tracheophytes
- Clade: Angiosperms
- Clade: Eudicots
- Clade: Rosids
- Order: Malvales
- Family: Dipterocarpaceae
- Genus: Rubroshorea
- Species: R. pauciflora

Binomial name
- Rubroshorea pauciflora (King) P.S.Ashton & J.Heck.

Synonyms
- Shorea pauciflora King

Species of tree

Rubroshorea pauciflora, synonym Shorea pauciflora, (called, along with some other species in the genera Rubroshorea and Shorea, dark red meranti or red lauan) is a species of plant in the family Dipterocarpaceae. It is native to Borneo, Peninsular Malaysia, and Sumatra. It is a large tree, with a cauliflower-shaped crown which can grow up to 60 metres tall and a straight, cylindrical bole up to 220 cm in diameter, with buttresses up to 4 metres tall. It grows in lowland and hill mixed dipterocarp rain forest on well-drained sandy and clayey soils up to 900 metres elevation. It is threatened by habitat loss.

The species was first described as Shorea pauciflora by George King in 1893. The specific epithet pauciflora is Latin for 'few-flowered'. In 2022 Peter Shaw Ashton and Jacqueline Heckenhauer placed the species in the newly-described genus Rubroshorea as R. pauciflora.
