= Rubroshorea almon =

Conservation status
- Near Threatened (IUCN 3.1)

Scientific classification
- Kingdom: Plantae
- Clade: Tracheophytes
- Clade: Angiosperms
- Clade: Eudicots
- Clade: Rosids
- Order: Malvales
- Family: Dipterocarpaceae
- Genus: Rubroshorea
- Species: R. almon

Binomial name
- Rubroshorea almon (Foxw.) P.S.Ashton & J.Heck.

Synonyms
- Shorea almon Foxw.

Species of tree

Rubroshorea almon (called, along with some other species in the genera Rubroshorea and Shorea, light red meranti, Philippine mahogany, or white lauan) is a species of plant in the family Dipterocarpaceae. It is native to Borneo and the Philippines. It grows on hillsides in lowland mixed dipterocarp rain forests up to 1,000 metres elevation.

The species was first described as Shorea almon by Frederick William Foxworthy in 1938. In 2022 Peter Shaw Ashton and Jacqueline Heckenhauer placed the species in genus Rubroshorea as R. almon.

== See also ==
- List of Shorea species
