= Hopea subalata =

Conservation status
- Endangered (IUCN 3.1)

Scientific classification
- Kingdom: Plantae
- Clade: Tracheophytes
- Clade: Angiosperms
- Clade: Eudicots
- Clade: Rosids
- Order: Malvales
- Family: Dipterocarpaceae
- Genus: Hopea
- Species: H. subalata

Binomial name
- Hopea subalata Symington

Species of flowering plant

Hopea subalata or locally known as Merawan Kanching or Giam Kanching is a species of plant in the family Dipterocarpaceae. It is a tree endemic to Peninsular Malaysia where it is confined to Selangor.

== Description ==
Hopea subalata is a small-sized tree that reaches to about 32 cm in diameter. This species is a hyper-endemic species which is known only from lowland dipterocarp forest of Kanching Forest Reserve in Selangor.

== Etymology ==
The local name Kanching was named after its type locality of Kanching Forest Reserve in Selangor. Merawan is a Malay term for "as high as the clouds" to represent its height while Giam is a Malay term for "tree with hardwood trunks and branches".

== Conservation effort ==
Although its timbers are not harvested commercially, it is still facing extinction issue due to its low population size and threats from urban development of nearby Rawang town. As of 2010s, there were only 400 trees of Hopea subalata remain in the forest reserve and the world. Due to this, the Rawang Bypass that was constructed through the forest area was redesigned into curvy structure to reduce extensive felling of trees, cutting and filling of slopes, and disruption of free flow of wildlife in the area.

As further conservation effort, the tree is also being planted outside of its original area such as in an urban forest known as "Khazanah Rimba" in Pantai Eco Park, Kuala Lumpur.
