= Rubroshorea ovata =

Conservation status
- Least Concern (IUCN 3.1)

Scientific classification
- Kingdom: Plantae
- Clade: Embryophytes
- Clade: Tracheophytes
- Clade: Angiosperms
- Clade: Eudicots
- Clade: Rosids
- Order: Malvales
- Family: Dipterocarpaceae
- Genus: Rubroshorea
- Species: R. ovata

Binomial name
- Rubroshorea ovata (Dyer ex Brandis) P.S.Ashton & J.Heck.

Synonyms
- Shorea ovata Dyer ex Brandis; Shorea agsaboensis W.L.Stern; Shorea plagata Foxw.

Species of tree

Rubroshorea ovata, synonym Shorea ovata, (called, along with some other species in the genera Shorea and Rubroshorea, dark red meranti) is a species of plant in the family Dipterocarpaceae. It is a tree found in Sumatra, Peninsular Malaysia, Borneo and the Philippines. It is threatened by habitat loss.
