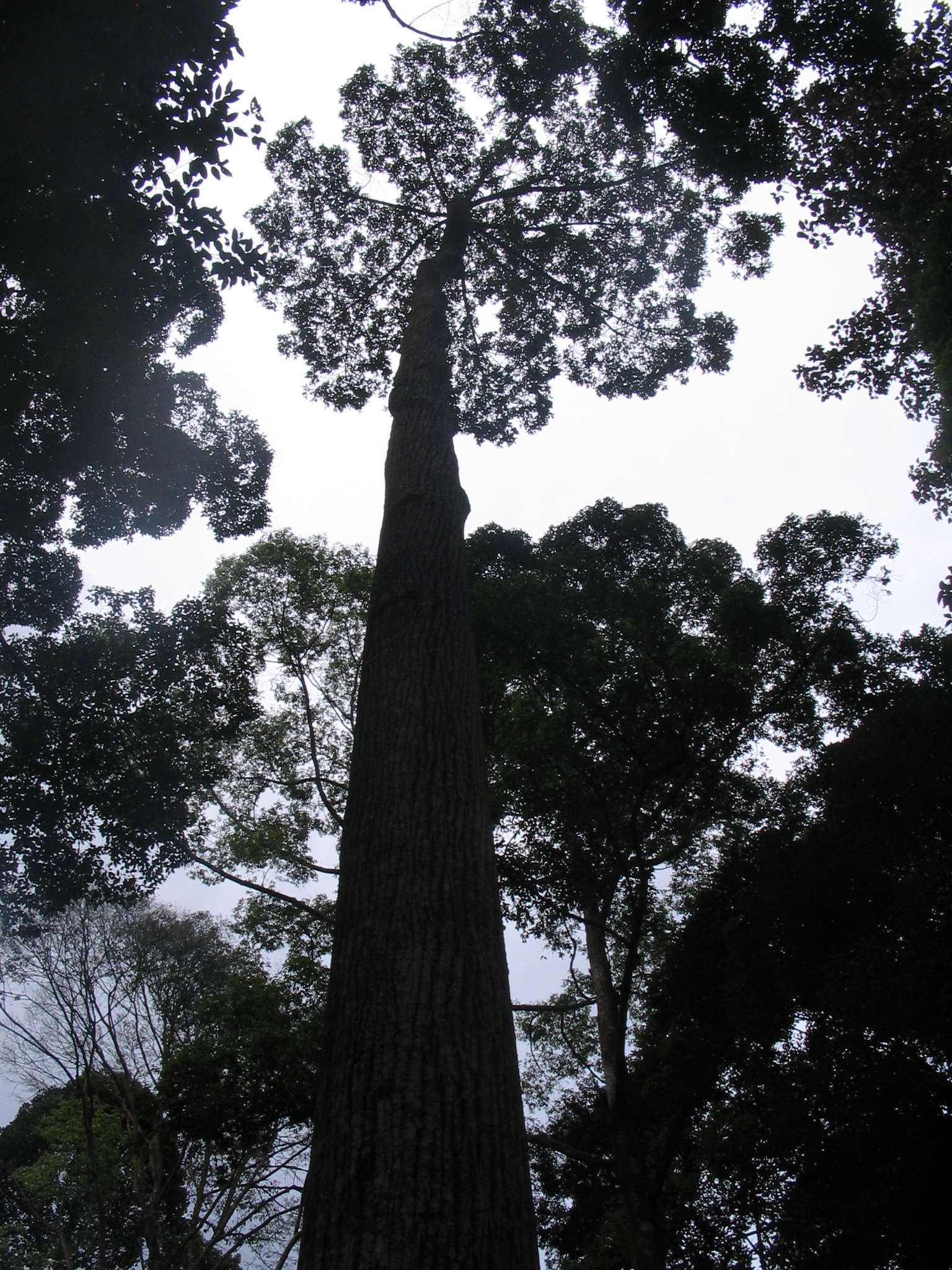

Conservation status
- Least Concern (IUCN 3.1)

Scientific classification
- Kingdom: Plantae
- Clade: Tracheophytes
- Clade: Angiosperms
- Clade: Eudicots
- Clade: Rosids
- Order: Malvales
- Family: Dipterocarpaceae
- Genus: Rubroshorea
- Species: R. ovalis

Binomial name
- Rubroshorea ovalis (Korth.) P.S.Ashton & J.Heck.

Synonyms
- Hopea aspera de Vriese; Shorea eximia (Miq.) Scheff.; Shorea eximia var. angustifolia Burck; Shorea fusca Burck; Shorea ovalis (Korth.) Blume; Shorea ovalis subsp. ovalis; Shorea ovalis subsp. sarawakensis P.S.Ashton; Shorea ovalis subsp. sericea (Dyer) P.S.Ashton; Shorea rigida Brandis; Shorea sericea Dyer; Shorea sublacunosa Scheff.; Vatica eximia Miq.; Vatica ovalis Korth.; Vatica sublacunosa Miq.

= Rubroshorea ovalis =

Species of tree native to Southeast Asia

Rubroshorea ovalis is a species of flowering plant in the family Dipterocarpaceae. It is a large fast-growing tree, up to 50 meters tall, which is native to Borneo, Sumatra, Peninsular Malaysia, and Singapore. It flowers every 3 to 4 years between March and June. Flowers are pollinated by insects and seeds are dispersed by the wind.

It grows in lowland mixed dipterocarp forests on hills and clay soils up to 500 meters elevation. Trees form ectomycorrhizal root associations.
