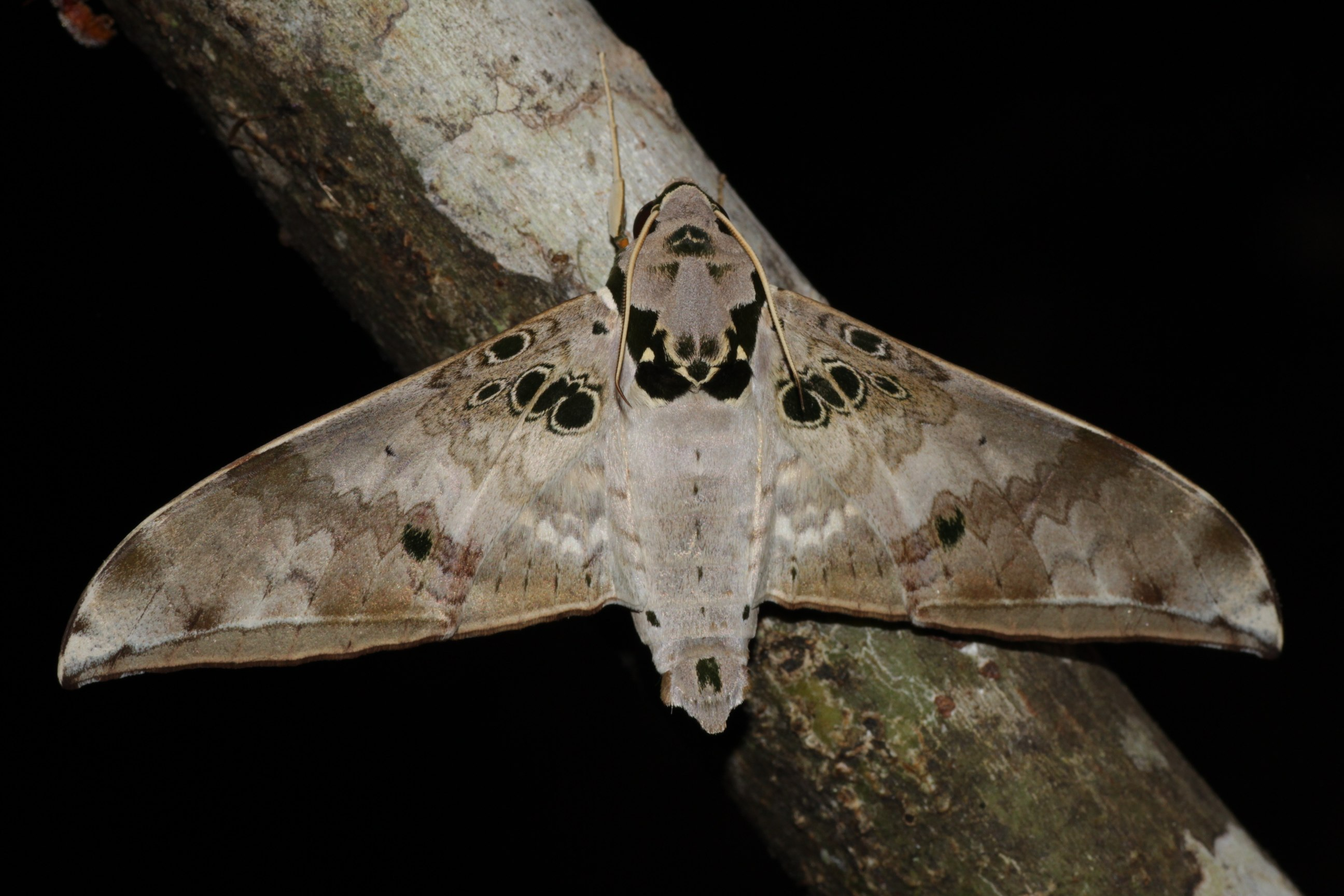

Scientific classification
- Kingdom: Animalia
- Phylum: Arthropoda
- Class: Insecta
- Order: Lepidoptera
- Family: Sphingidae
- Genus: Ambulyx
- Species: A. canescens

Binomial name
- Ambulyx canescens Walker, [1865]

Synonyms
- Oxyambulyx canescens Walker; Rothschild & Jordan, 1903; Ambulyx argentata Druce, 1882

= Ambulyx canescens =

Species of moth

Ambulyx canescens is a moth of the family Sphingidae first described by Francis Walker in 1865.

== Distribution ==
It is found in Indochina, Malaysia, Sumatra, Java, Borneo and the Philippines.

== Description ==
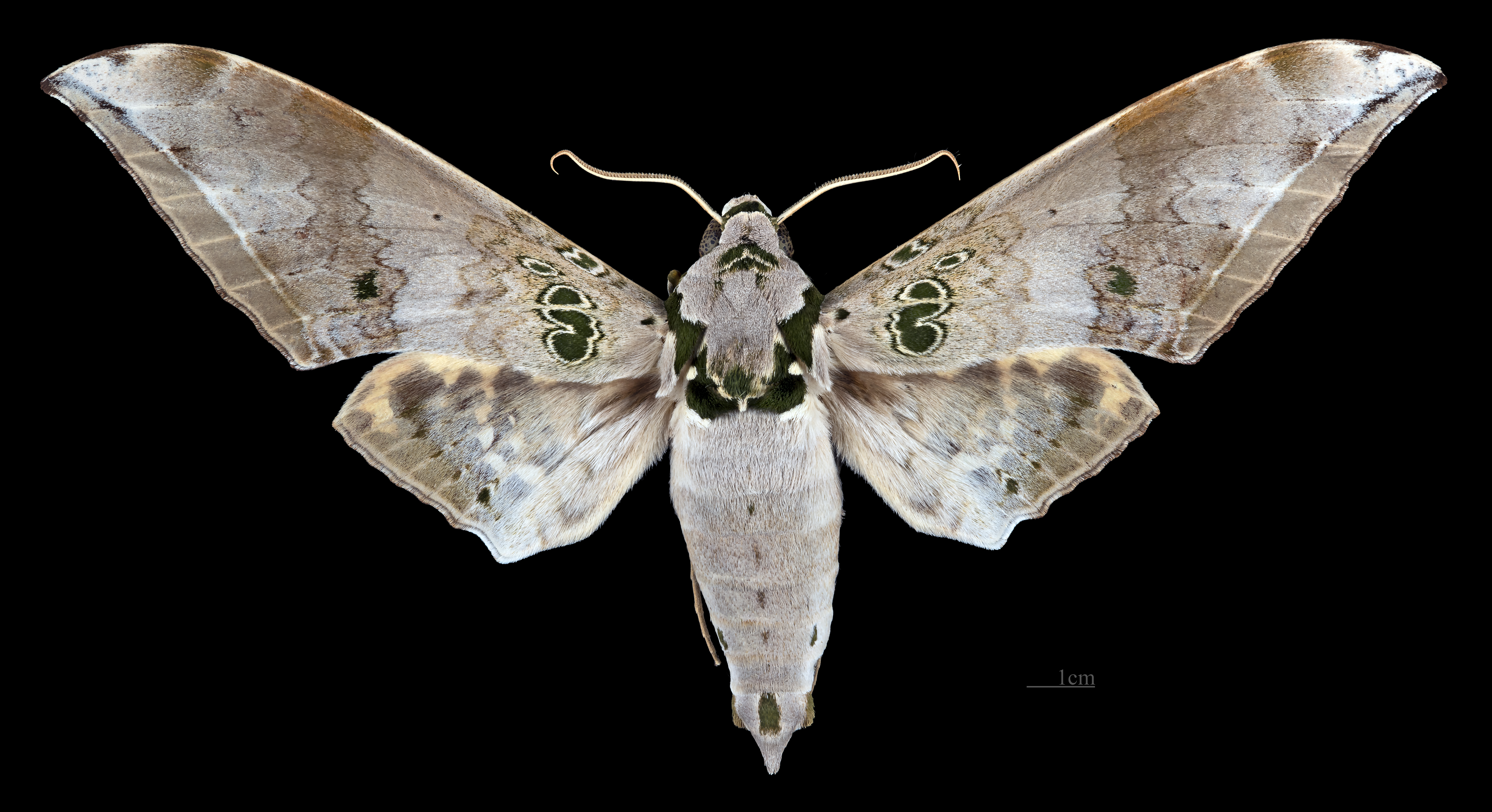
Male, dorsal view

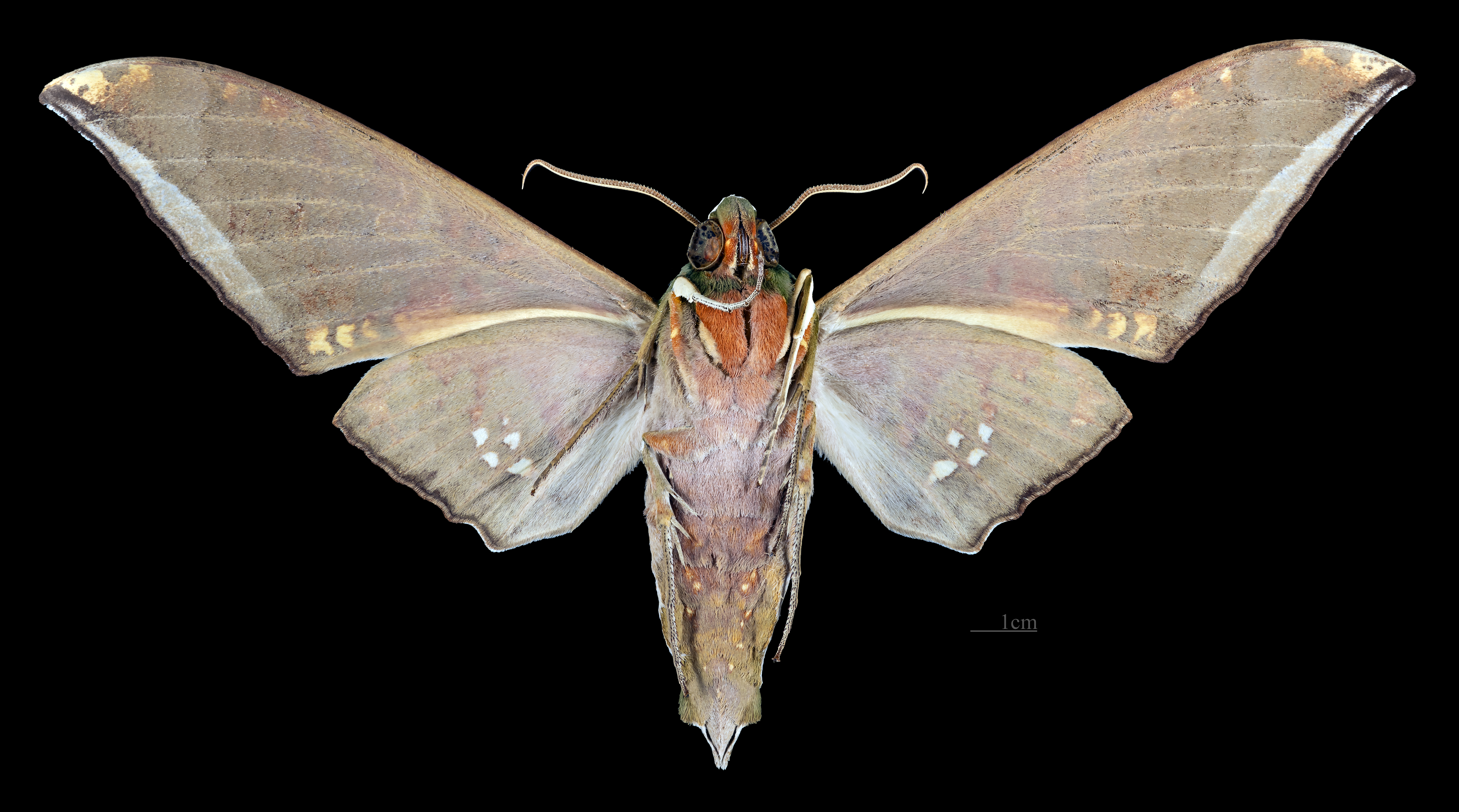
Male, ventral view

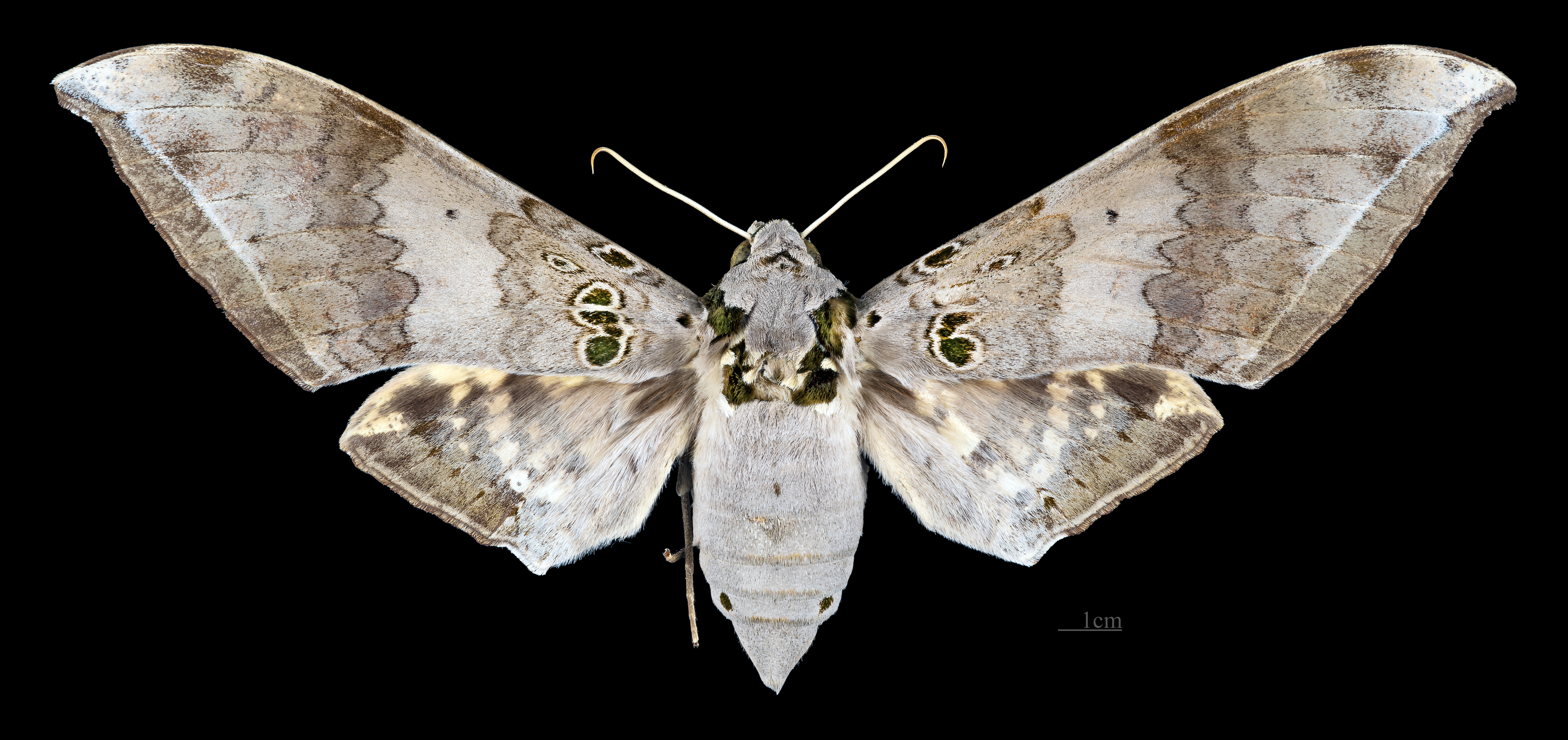
Female, dorsal view

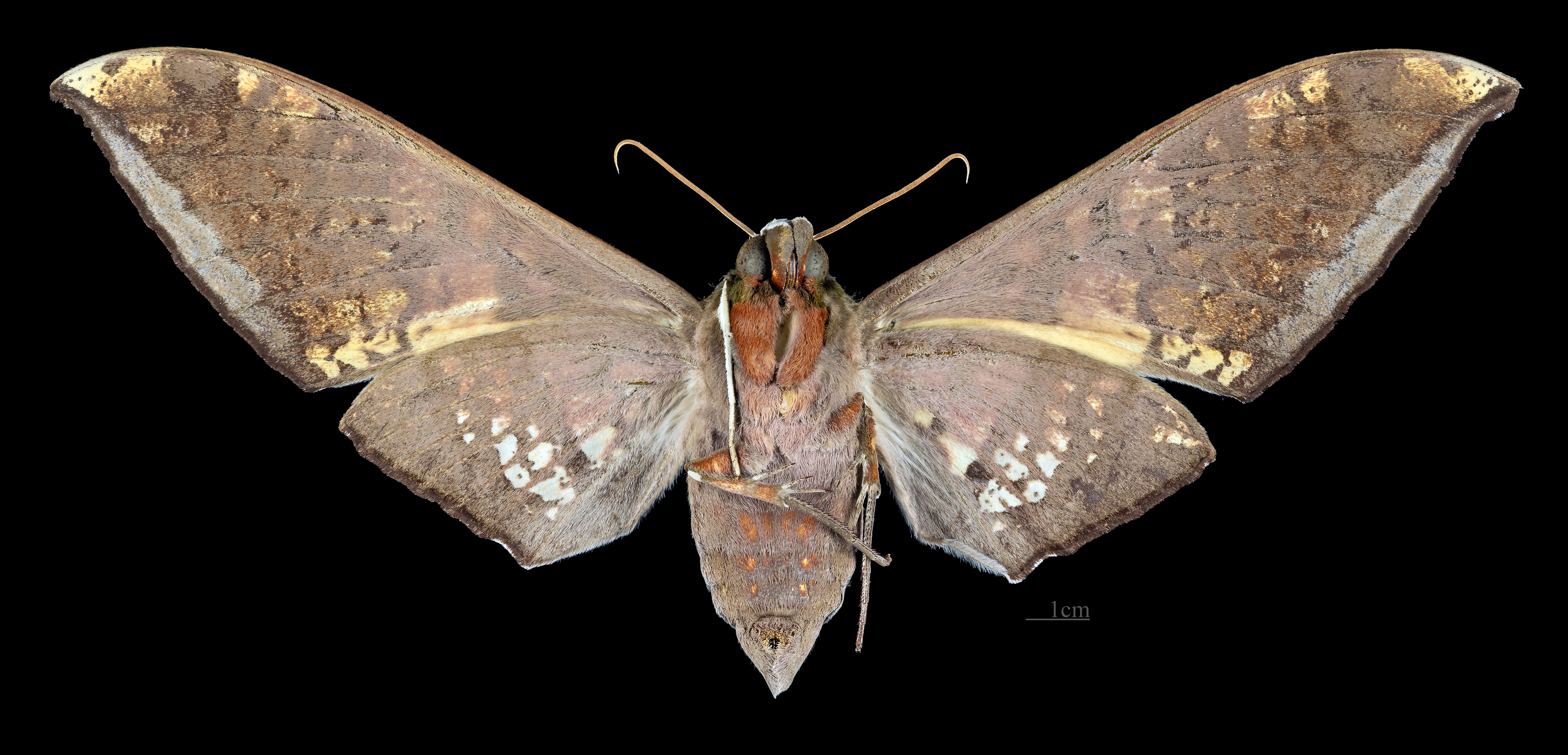
Female, ventral view

== Biology ==
It is considered a forest pest, because its larvae feed on the leaves of young Dryobalanops lanceolata. Larvae have also been reared on Shorea lepidota.

== List of subspecies ==
- Ambulyx canescens canescens
- Ambulyx canescens flava (Clark, 1924)
- Ambulyx canescens flavocelebensis
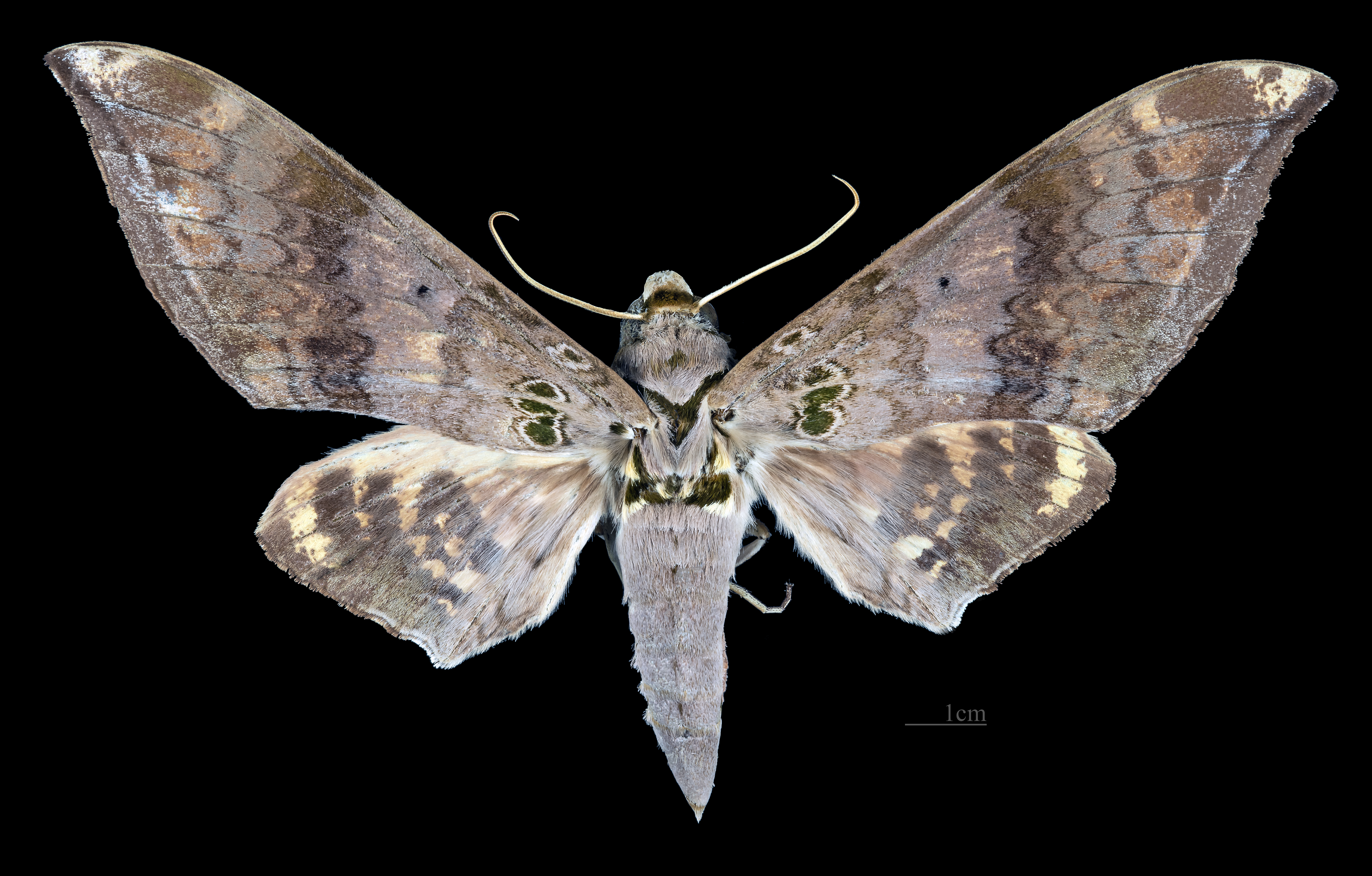
Male A. c. flava

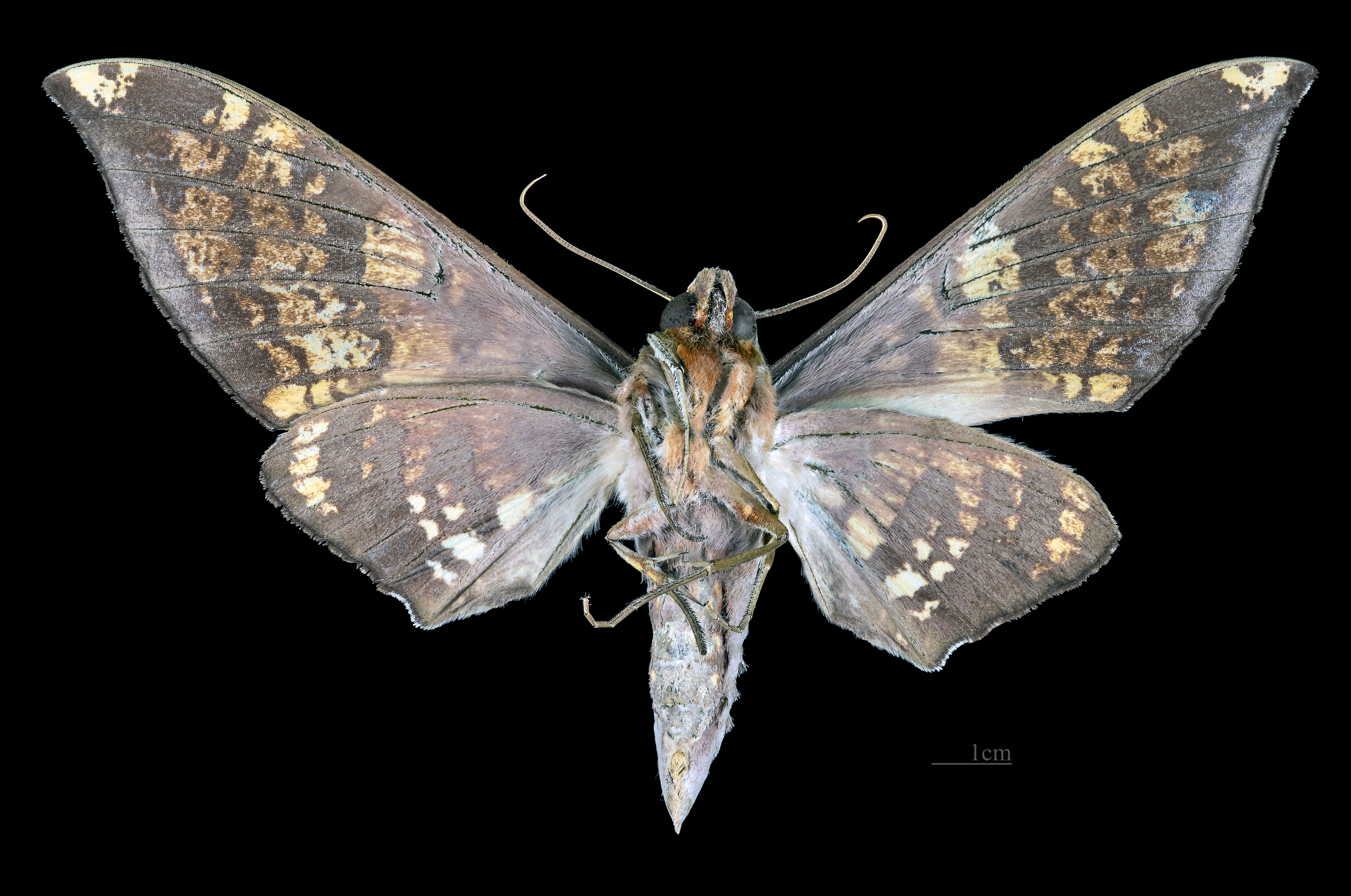
Male A. c. flava
