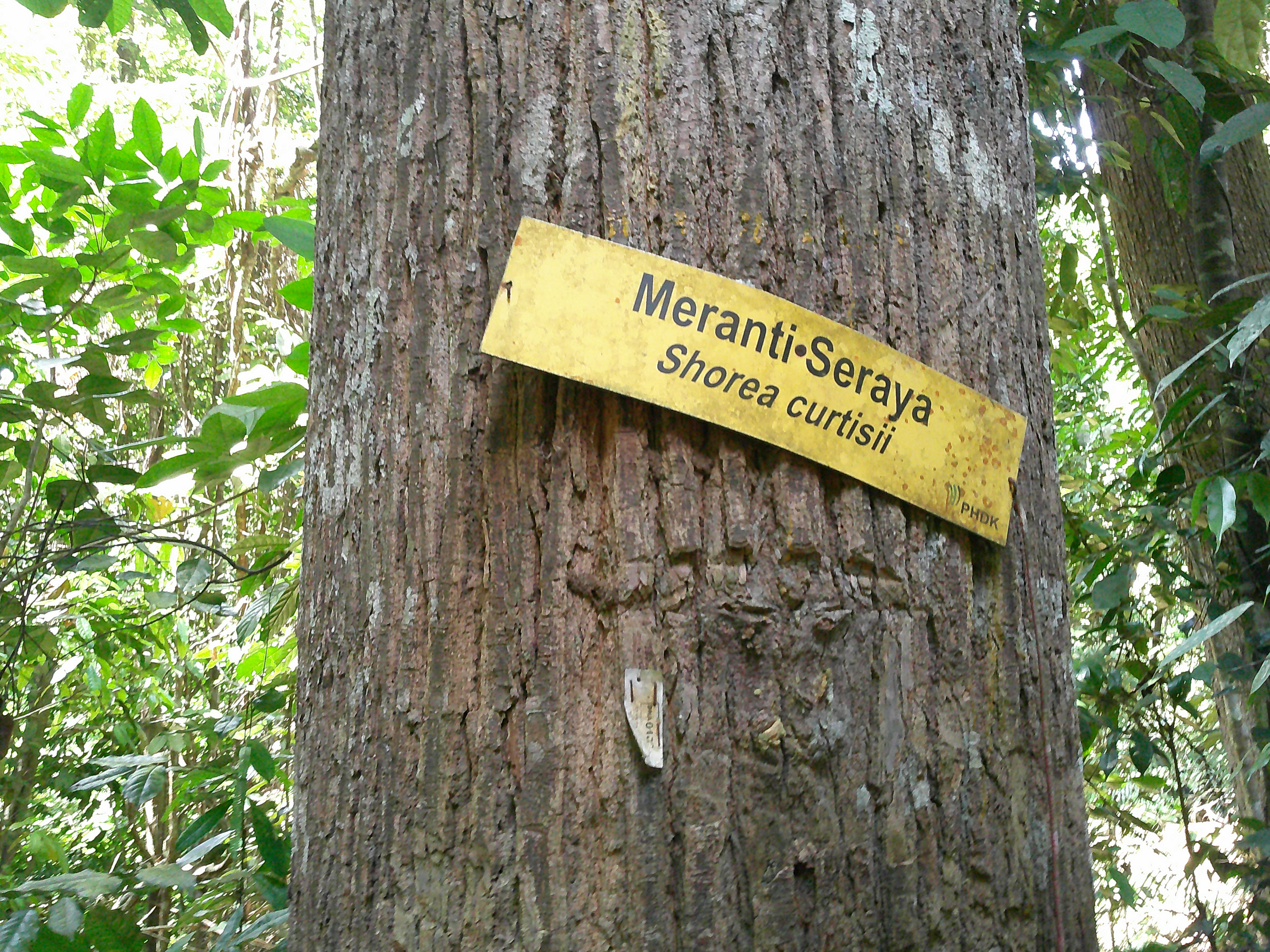
- Bark of Rubroshorea curtisii

Conservation status
- Least Concern (IUCN 3.1)

Scientific classification
- Kingdom: Plantae
- Clade: Embryophytes
- Clade: Tracheophytes
- Clade: Spermatophytes
- Clade: Angiosperms
- Clade: Eudicots
- Clade: Rosids
- Order: Malvales
- Family: Dipterocarpaceae
- Genus: Rubroshorea
- Species: R. curtisii

Binomial name
- Rubroshorea curtisii (Dyer ex King) P.S.Ashton & J.Heck.

Synonyms
- Shorea curtisii Dyer ex King; Shorea curtisii subsp. grandis P.S.Ashton

= Rubroshorea curtisii =

Species of tree

Rubroshorea curtisii (also called Seraya, and along with some other species in the genus Rubroshorea, dark red meranti) is a species of tree in the family Dipterocarpaceae. It is native to Peninsular Malaysia, Singapore, Thailand, and northwestern Borneo. It grows as a large tree with a grey or reddish-brown and coarsely fissured trunk; and a greyish-blue crown. It fruits every 5–10 years, after prolonged periods of drought.

The species was first described as Shorea curtisii in 1893. In 2022 Peter Shaw Ashton and Jacqueline Heckenhauer placed the species in genus Rubroshorea as R. curtisii.
