= S. uliginosa =

S. uliginosa may refer to:

- Salvia uliginosa, the bog sage, a herbaceous perennial plant species native to southern Brazil, Uruguay and Argentina
- Shorea uliginosa, a plant species found in Indonesia and Malaysia

== See also ==
- Uliginosa
