= Rubroshorea scaberrima =

Conservation status
- Near Threatened (IUCN 3.1)

Scientific classification
- Kingdom: Plantae
- Clade: Embryophytes
- Clade: Tracheophytes
- Clade: Angiosperms
- Clade: Eudicots
- Clade: Rosids
- Order: Malvales
- Family: Dipterocarpaceae
- Genus: Rubroshorea
- Species: R. scaberrima

Binomial name
- Rubroshorea scaberrima (Burck) P.S.Ashton & J.Heck.

Synonyms
- Shorea scaberrima Burck

Species of tree

Rubroshorea scaberrima is a tree in the family Dipterocarpaceae which is endemic to Borneo.

The species was first described as Shorea scaberrima by William Burck in 1886. The specific epithet scaberrima means 'very rough', referring to the indumentum. In 2022 Peter Shaw Ashton and Jacqueline Heckenhauer placed the species in genus Rubroshorea as R. scaberrima.

== Description ==
Rubroshorea scaberrima grows up to 40 metres (130 ft) tall, with a trunk diameter of up to 1.1 m (4 ft). It has buttresses up to 1.5 m (5 ft) tall. The multi-coloured bark starts smooth, later becoming cracked and flaky. The leathery to papery leaves are ovate to obovate. The inflorescences bear pink flowers.

== Distribution and habitat ==
Rubroshorea scaberrima is endemic to Borneo. Its habitat is mixed dipterocarp forests to elevations of 850 m (2,800 ft).

== Conservation ==
Rubroshorea scaberrima has been assessed as near threatened on the IUCN Red List. It is threatened by land conversion for plantations. It is also threatened by logging for its timber, including the construction of logging roads. R. scaberrima does occur in a number of protected areas, but only in Sarawak.
