= Rubroshorea lepidota =

Conservation status
- Near Threatened (IUCN 3.1)

Scientific classification
- Kingdom: Plantae
- Clade: Tracheophytes
- Clade: Angiosperms
- Clade: Eudicots
- Clade: Rosids
- Order: Malvales
- Family: Dipterocarpaceae
- Genus: Rubroshorea
- Species: R. lepidota

Binomial name
- Rubroshorea lepidota (Korth.) P.S.Ashton & J.Heck.

Synonyms
- Shorea lepidota (Korth.) Blume; Shorea megistocarpa Foxw.; Shorea nitens Miq.; Shorea stipulosa Burck; Vatica lepidota Korth. (1841); Vatica stipulosa Miq.

Species of tree

Rubroshorea lepidota (called, along with some other dipterocarp species, light red meranti) is a species of flowering plant in the family Dipterocarpaceae. It is native to Sumatra, Peninsular Malaysia, and Peninsular Thailand. It is a tall tree which can grow up to 50 metres tall, with a buttressed trunk. It grows in lowland dipterocarp rain forest up to 350 metres elevation.
