= Syzygium symingtonianum =

Conservation status
- Least Concern (IUCN 2.3)

Scientific classification
- Kingdom: Plantae
- Clade: Tracheophytes
- Clade: Angiosperms
- Clade: Eudicots
- Clade: Rosids
- Order: Myrtales
- Family: Myrtaceae
- Genus: Syzygium
- Species: S. symingtonianum

Binomial name
- Syzygium symingtonianum (M.R. Hend.) I.M.Turner

Synonyms
- Eugenia symingtoniana M.R. Hend.; Stereocaryum symingtonianum (M.R.Hend.) A.J.Scott

Species of flowering plant

Syzygium symingtonianum is a species of plant in the family Myrtaceae. It is endemic to Peninsular Malaysia.

The specific epithet symingtonianum honors botanist Colin Fraser Symington.
