= Endiandra monothyra =

- Endiandra monothyra botanical sketch

Conservation status
- Least Concern (IUCN 3.1)

Scientific classification
- Kingdom: Plantae
- Clade: Tracheophytes
- Clade: Angiosperms
- Clade: Magnoliids
- Order: Laurales
- Family: Lauraceae
- Genus: Endiandra
- Species: E. monothyra

Binomial name
- Endiandra monothyra B.Hyland

Species of flowering plant

Endiandra monothyra is a species of plant in the family Lauraceae native to Queensland, Australia. It is a large rainforest tree capable of reaching up to 35 m (115 ft) in height. It occurs along the northeast coastal and sub-coastal areas from near Cooktown to about Townsville.

== Taxonomy ==
The species was first described in 1989 by Australian botanist Bernard Hyland, in his 367-page revision of the Lauraceae family in Australia. He recognised two subspecies:

- Endiandra monothyra subsp. monothyra
- Endiandra monothyra subsp. trichophylla

== Conservation ==
This species was assessed by the International Union for Conservation of Nature (IUCN) in 2018 and found to be of least concern. In its statement, the IUCN cites the lack of any perceived threat to the species, as well as a wide distribution and large population, as the basis for the assessment.
