= Rubroshorea negrosensis =

Conservation status
- Least Concern (IUCN 3.1)

Scientific classification
- Kingdom: Plantae
- Clade: Tracheophytes
- Clade: Angiosperms
- Clade: Eudicots
- Clade: Rosids
- Order: Malvales
- Family: Dipterocarpaceae
- Genus: Rubroshorea
- Species: R. negrosensis

Binomial name
- Rubroshorea negrosensis (Foxw.) P.S.Ashton & J.Heck.

Synonyms
- Shorea negrosensis Foxw.

Species of tree

Rubroshorea negrosensis (called, along with some other dipterocarp species, red lauan) is a species of flowering plant in the family Dipterocarpaceae. It is endemic to the Philippines. It is a tall tree, growing up to 50 meters tall with a bole up to 1 meter in diameter.

The species is native to the islands of Luzon (provinces of Cagayan, Isabela, Aurora, Nueva Ecija, Laguna, Quezon, Camarines, Albay, and Sorsogon), Polillio, Negros, Cebu, Leyte, Biliran, Samar, Mindanano (provinces of Zamboanga, Lanao, Cotabato, Bukidnon, Davao, Surigao, Agusan), and Basilan. It grows, often gregariously, in lowland evergreen and semi-evergreen dipterocarp rain forests.

The species was first described as Shorea negrosensis by Frederick William Foxworthy in 1911. In 2022 Peter Shaw Ashton and Jacqueline Heckenhauer placed the species in genus Rubroshorea as R. negrosensis.
