= Rubroshorea uliginosa =

Conservation status
- Endangered (IUCN 3.1)

Scientific classification
- Kingdom: Plantae
- Clade: Tracheophytes
- Clade: Angiosperms
- Clade: Eudicots
- Clade: Rosids
- Order: Malvales
- Family: Dipterocarpaceae
- Genus: Rubroshorea
- Species: R. uliginosa

Binomial name
- Rubroshorea uliginosa Foxw.

Synonyms
- Shorea rugosa var. uliginosa (Foxw.) Symington; Shorea uliginosa Foxw.

Species of tree

Rubroshorea uliginosa is a species of flowering plant in the family Dipterocarpaceae. It is a tree found in Sumatra, Peninsular Malaysia and Borneo.
