= Rubroshorea balangeran =

Conservation status
- Vulnerable (IUCN 3.1)

Scientific classification
- Kingdom: Plantae
- Clade: Tracheophytes
- Clade: Angiosperms
- Clade: Eudicots
- Clade: Rosids
- Order: Malvales
- Family: Dipterocarpaceae
- Genus: Rubroshorea
- Species: R. balangeran

Binomial name
- Rubroshorea balangeran (Korth.) P.S.Ashton & J.Heck.

Synonyms
- Hopea balangeran Korth. (1841) (basionym); Parahopea balangeran (Korth.) F.Heim; Shorea balangeran (Korth.) Burck; Shorea balangeran var. angustifolia Boerl.

Species of plant

Rubroshorea balangeran, called (along with some other species in the genera Shorea and Rubroshorea) red balau, is a species of plant in the family Dipterocarpaceae. It is native to Sumatra and Borneo. It is a Vulnerable species threatened by habitat loss.

The species was first described as Hopea balangeran by Pieter Willem Korthals in 1841. In 2022 Peter Shaw Ashton and Jacqueline Heckenhauer placed the species in genus Rubroshorea as R. balangeran.
