= Rubroshorea teysmanniana =

Conservation status
- Critically Endangered (IUCN 3.1)

Scientific classification
- Kingdom: Plantae
- Clade: Embryophytes
- Clade: Tracheophytes
- Clade: Angiosperms
- Clade: Eudicots
- Clade: Rosids
- Order: Malvales
- Family: Dipterocarpaceae
- Genus: Rubroshorea
- Species: R. teysmanniana

Binomial name
- Rubroshorea teysmanniana (Dyer ex Brandis) P.S.Ashton & J.Heck.

Synonyms
- Shorea teysmanniana Dyer ex Brandis; Shorea balangeroides Boerl.; Shorea paludosa Foxw.; Gordonia vidalii Szyszyl.

Species of tree

Rubroshorea teysmanniana, synonym Shorea teysmanniana, is a timber tree of the family Dipterocarpaceae. It occurs in Sumatra, Peninsular Malaysia and Borneo.
