= Jacques-Christophe Valmont de Bomare =

French botanist and naturalist (1731–1807)

- Born: 17 September 1731; Rouen, France
- Died: 24 August 1807 (aged 75); Paris, France
- Known for: natural history, botany

Jacques-Christophe Valmont de Bomare (born 17 September 1731, Rouen; died 24 August 1807, Paris) was a French botanist and naturalist. He wrote an influential encyclopedia of natural history in the 1760s: Dictionnaire raisonné universel d’histoire naturelle (6 volumes, Paris, Chez Lacombe, 1764–1768).

== Works ==
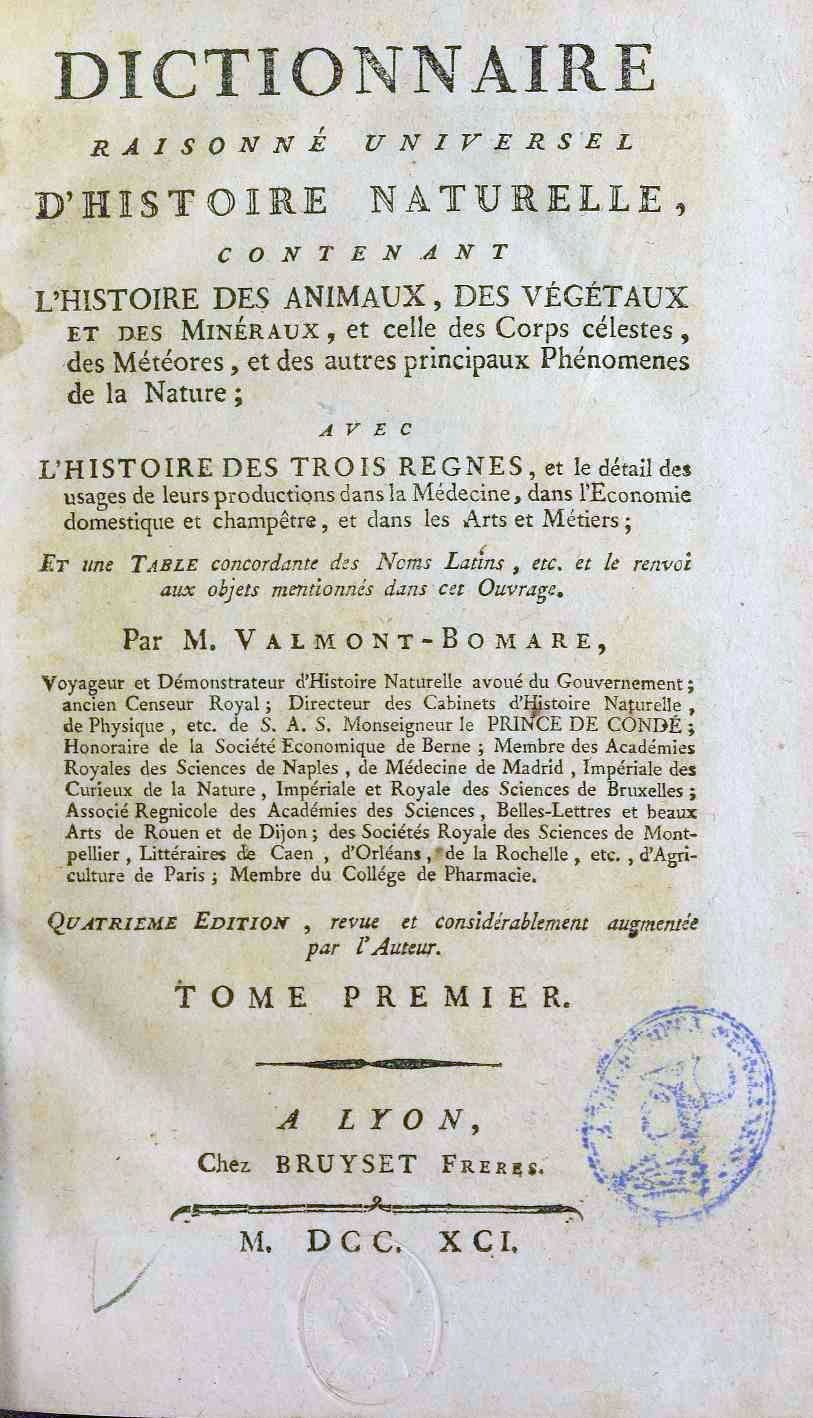
Dictionnaire raisonné universel d'histoire naturelle, 1791

- Mineralogie (in French). Vol. 2. Paris: Philippe Vincent. 1762.
  - Dictionnaire raisonné universel d'histoire naturelle (in French). Vol. 2. Lyon: Bruyset frères. 1791.
  - Dictionnaire raisonné universel d'histoire naturelle (in French). Vol. 5. Lyon: Bruyset frères. 1791.
  - Dictionnaire raisonné universel d'histoire naturelle (in French). Vol. 6. Lyon: Bruyset frères. 1791.
  - Dictionnaire raisonné universel d'histoire naturelle (in French). Vol. 7. Lyon: Bruyset frères. 1791.
  - Dictionnaire raisonné universel d'histoire naturelle (in French). Vol. 9. Lyon: Bruyset frères. 1791.
  - Dictionnaire raisonné universel d'histoire naturelle (in French). Vol. 11. Lyon: Bruyset frères. 1791.
  - Dictionnaire raisonné universel d'histoire naturelle (in French). Vol. 12. Lyon: Bruyset frères. 1791.
  - Dictionnaire raisonné universel d'histoire naturelle (in French). Vol. 13. Lyon: Bruyset frères. 1791.
  - Dictionnaire raisonné universel d'histoire naturelle (in French). Vol. 14. Lyon: Bruyset frères. 1791.
  - Dictionnaire raisonné universel d'histoire naturelle (in French). Vol. 15. Lyon: Bruyset frères. 1791.
