= Willem Meijer =

Dutch botanist and plant collector (1923–2003)

- Willem Meijer in September 1957, shortly after completing a plant collecting expedition to western Sumatra.
- Born: 1923; The Hague, Netherlands
- Died: 22 October 2003 (aged 79–80); Lexington, Kentucky], United States
- Known for: Numerous publications and plant collections
- Scientific career
- Fields: Botany
- Workplaces: University of Amsterdam, Herbarium Bogoriense, Faculty of Agriculture (Pajakumbuh), Forest Department of North Borneo, University of Kentucky

Willem Meijer (1923 – 22 October 2003) was a Dutch botanist and plant collector.

== Background and education ==
Meijer was born in 1923 in The Hague, Netherlands. He received his Ph.D. from the University of Amsterdam in 1951. Meijer travelled to Java later that year and became the Assistant of the Herbarium Bogoriense (Bogor herbarium).

== Early career ==
He returned to Europe for a short leave before going back to Indonesia in February 1955. There he lectured on botany at the Faculty of Agriculture, Pajakumbuh, Sumatra. In September 1956, Meijer was appointed the Professor of Botany at the institution. His expertise lay in hepaticology, although he also studied mosses, ferns, and spermatophytes

== Borneo and America ==
Meijer was repatriated in 1958. From May 1959, he was employed by the Forest Department of North Borneo, stationed in Sandakan. From 1962 to 1963, he made a round-the-world trip, visiting herbaria in various countries. Meijer returned to Europe on leave again in 1966. In 1968, he was appointed Visiting Associate (later Associate) Professor at the University of Kentucky, Lexington. He stayed there until his death on 22 October 2003.
