= Sundaland heath forests =

WWF ecoregion

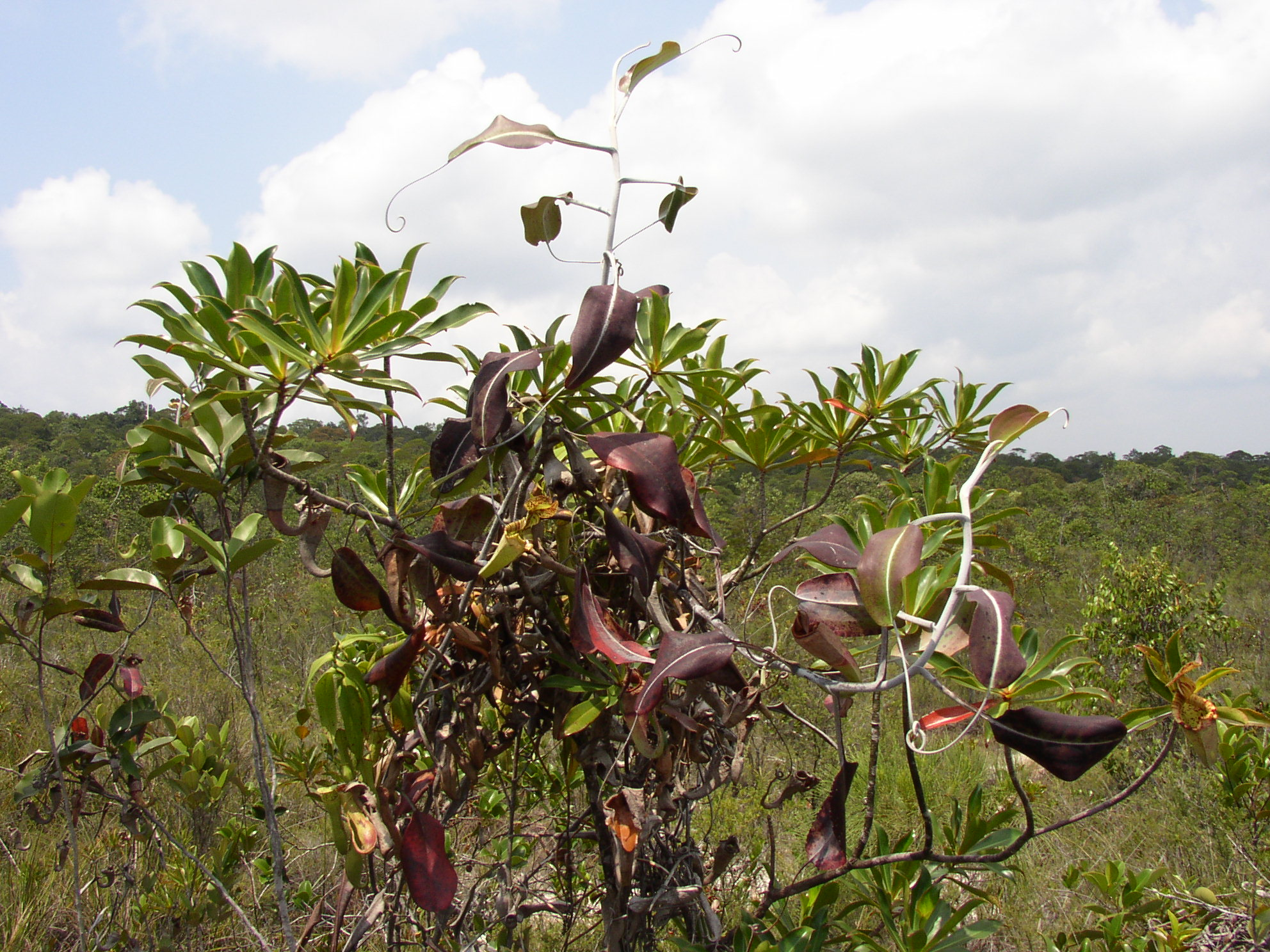
- Padang scrub at Bako National Park

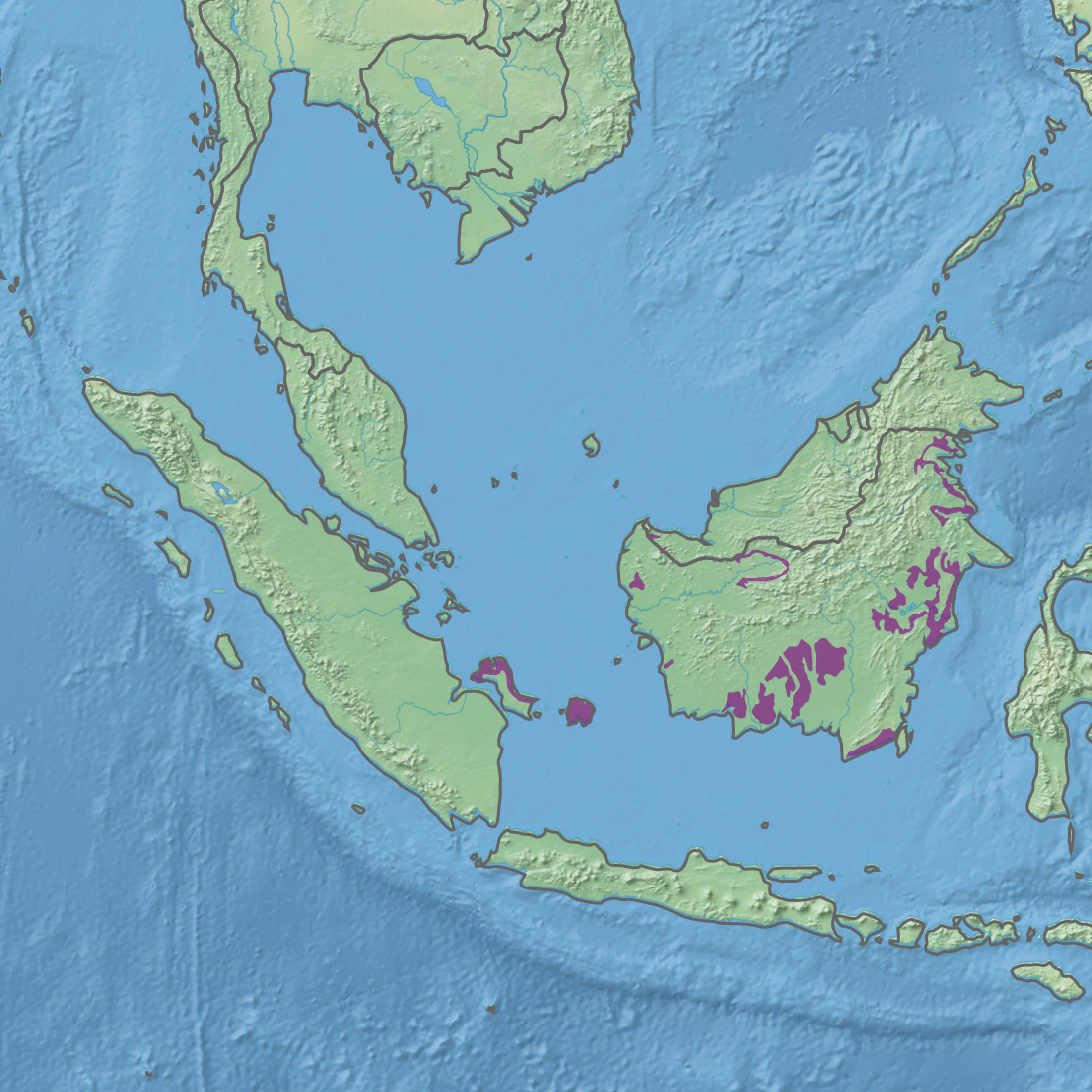
- Ecoregion territory (in purple)

Ecology
- Realm: Indomalayan
- Biome: tropical and subtropical moist broadleaf forests
- Borders: List: Borneo lowland rain forests; Borneo montane rain forests; Borneo peat swamp forests, Southwest Borneo freshwater swamp forests; Sumatran lowland rain forests

Geography
- Area: 76,130 km^{2} (29,390 sq mi)
- Countries: Indonesia; Malaysia

Conservation
- Conservation status: critical/endangered
- Protected: 6,436 km^{2} (8%)

The Sundaland heath forests, also known as Kerangas forest, is a type of tropical moist forest found on the island of Borneo, which is divided between Brunei, Indonesia, and Malaysia, as well as on the Indonesian islands of Belitung and Bangka, which lie to the west of Borneo.

== Setting ==
The word Kerangas, which means "land which cannot grow rice", comes from the Iban language. Heath forests occur on acidic sandy soils that are the result of the area's siliceous parent rocks. Permanently waterlogged heath forests are known as kerapah forests. Open-canopied woodlands are known as padang. The sandy soil of the heath forest are often lacking in nutrients; it is generally considered that nitrogen is the nutrient which is most lacking for plant growth in these forests. This is in contrast to many other lowland rain forests where phosphorus is considered to be lacking.

A more recent hypothesis, proposed by Proctor (1999), is that these forests are growing on soils which are highly acidic, such that hydrogen ion toxicity prevents the growth of non-adapted species. Moreover, heath forests' low soil pH hampers organic matter decomposition thus further slowing nutrient cycling.

== Flora ==
The Sundaland heath forests are distinct from the surrounding Borneo lowland rain forests in species composition, structure, texture, and color. The heath forests typically have a low, uniform canopy approximately 20 metres high, with thick underbrush and rich growth of moss and epiphytes. Trees often have closely-spaced trunks. In contrast, padang woodland is relatively open, with shrubs and trees up 5 metres tall, and a ground layer of sparse grasses and sedges.

Leaf sizes are generally smaller than other lowland rain forest trees. As an adaptation to the nutrient-poor conditions, some heath forest species have small, hard, thick sclerophyll leaves which are low in nitrogen. Many tree and plant species in the nutrient-deprived heath forests have developed unconventional ways to get their nutrients. Some tree species (Gymnostoma nobile, for example) utilise rhizobia (nitrogen fixing bacteria) in their root nodules. Myrmecophytes, including Myrmecodia spp. and Hydnophytum spp., are tree species that develop symbiotic associations with ants to get their nutrients. Other plants, including pitcher plants (Nepenthes spp.), sundews (Drosera spp.), and bladderwort (Utricularia spp.), are carnivorous, trapping and digesting insects.

Dipterocarps, including species of Shorea and Hopea, are common canopy trees on less barren soils, along with palms. Native trees include both heath forest endemics, typical lowland forest species, and species shared with peat swamp forests like Shorea albida, Shorea pachyphylla, and Shorea scabrida. Heath forests are also characterized by many plants of Australasian origin, including trees of families Myrtaceae and Casuarinaceae and the southern hemisphere conifers Agathis, Podocarpus, and Dacrydium.

== Fauna ==
The heath forests generally have less wildlife and species diversity than the surrounding lowland rain forests, with little or no endemic species.

== Protected areas ==
9.695% of the ecoregion is in protected areas. These include:

- Sungai Serudong Forest Reserve
- Bukit Soeharto Grand Forest Park
- Gunung Lalang Grand Forest Park
- Gunung Menumbing Grand Forest Park
- Gunung Mangkol Grand Forest Park
- Kutai National Park
- Tanjung Puting National Park
- Betung Kerihun National Park
- Danau Sentarum National Park
- Sebangau National Park
- Meratus National Park
- Gunung Maras National Park
- Dered Krian National Park
- Jering Menduyung Nature Recreation Park
- Bukit Tangkiling Nature Recreation Park
- Bukit Tangkiling Nature Reserve
- Padang Luway Nature Reserve
- Muara Kaman Sedulang Nature Reserve
- Teluk Kelumpang, Selat Laut dan Selat Sebuku Nature Reserve
