= Colin Fraser Symington =

Scottish botanist and forester (1905–1943)

Colin Fraser Symington (1905–1943) was a Scottish botanist and forester. He was born in Edinburgh in 1905, and studied at the University of Edinburgh (BSc) and at Oxford University. In 1927 he joined the Malayan Forestry Service and was later promoted to Forest Botanist at the Forest Research Institute at Kepong near Kuala Lumpur. While at the forestry service he developed the Dipterocarp timber classification system with H. E. Desch, a researcher of comparative wood anatomy. He also collected plants in the Malesian region, including Indonesia, Malaysia, and the Philippines, co-collecting with Frederick William Foxworthy, Encik Kiah bin Haji Mohamed Salleh, and Gordon H. Spare.

After the Fall of Singapore in World War II, he escaped to Australia and was later posted by the British Colonial Office to the Forestry Department in Nigeria, where he died in 1943.

Symington published 77 species names, mostly dipterocarps. The plant species Calophyllum symingtonianum M.R. Hend. & Wyatt-Sm., Eugenia symingtoniana M.R. Hend. and Shorea symingtonii G.H.S. Wood were all named in his honour.

== Works ==
- Foresters' Manual of Dipterocarps (1943)
- Commercial Timbers of the Malay Peninsula (with H. E. Desch)
