= Buttress root =

Large, wide roots on all sides of a shallowly rooted tree

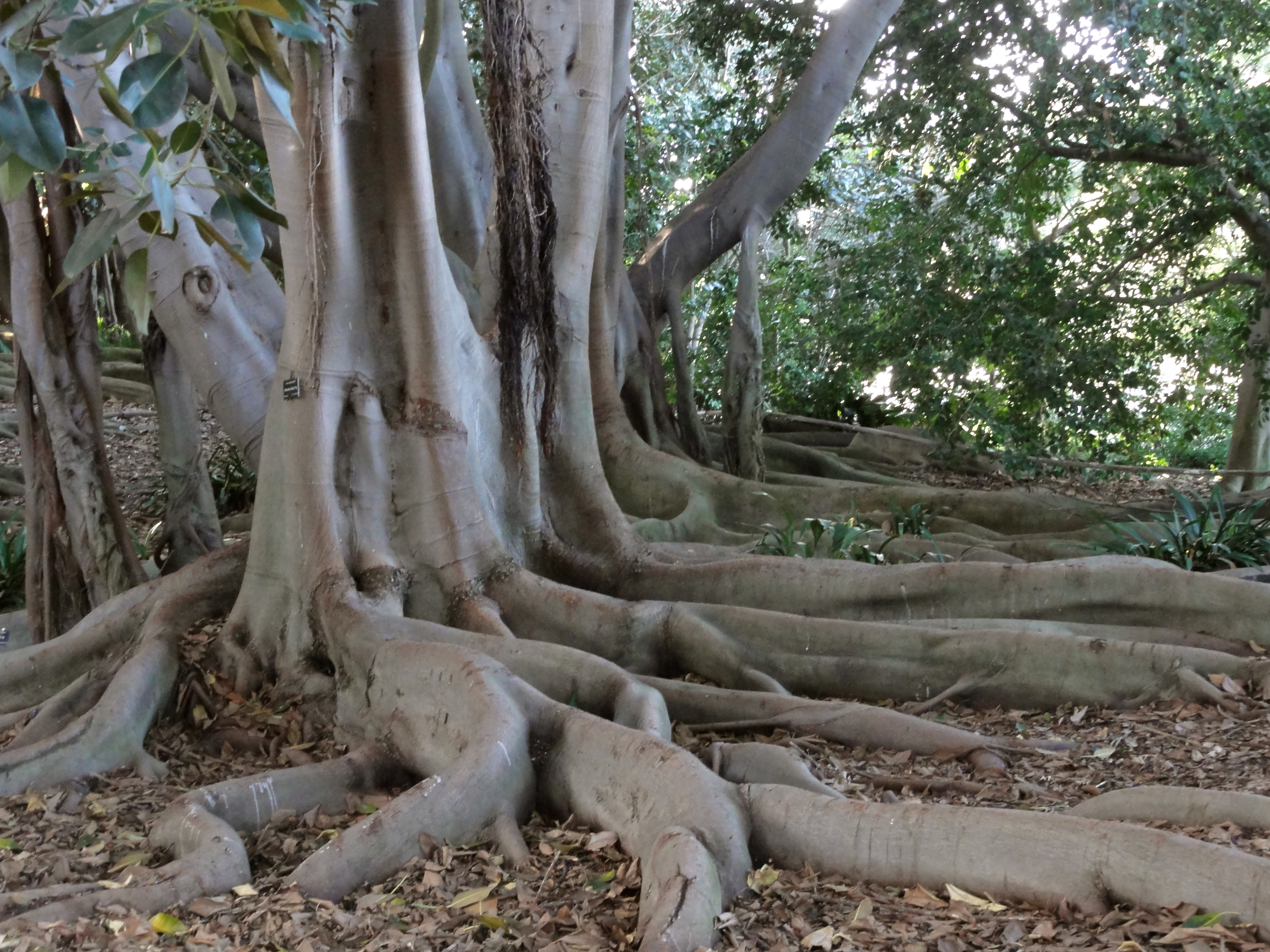
Buttress roots of a Bay fig tree at South Coast Botanical Garden in Palos Verdes, California

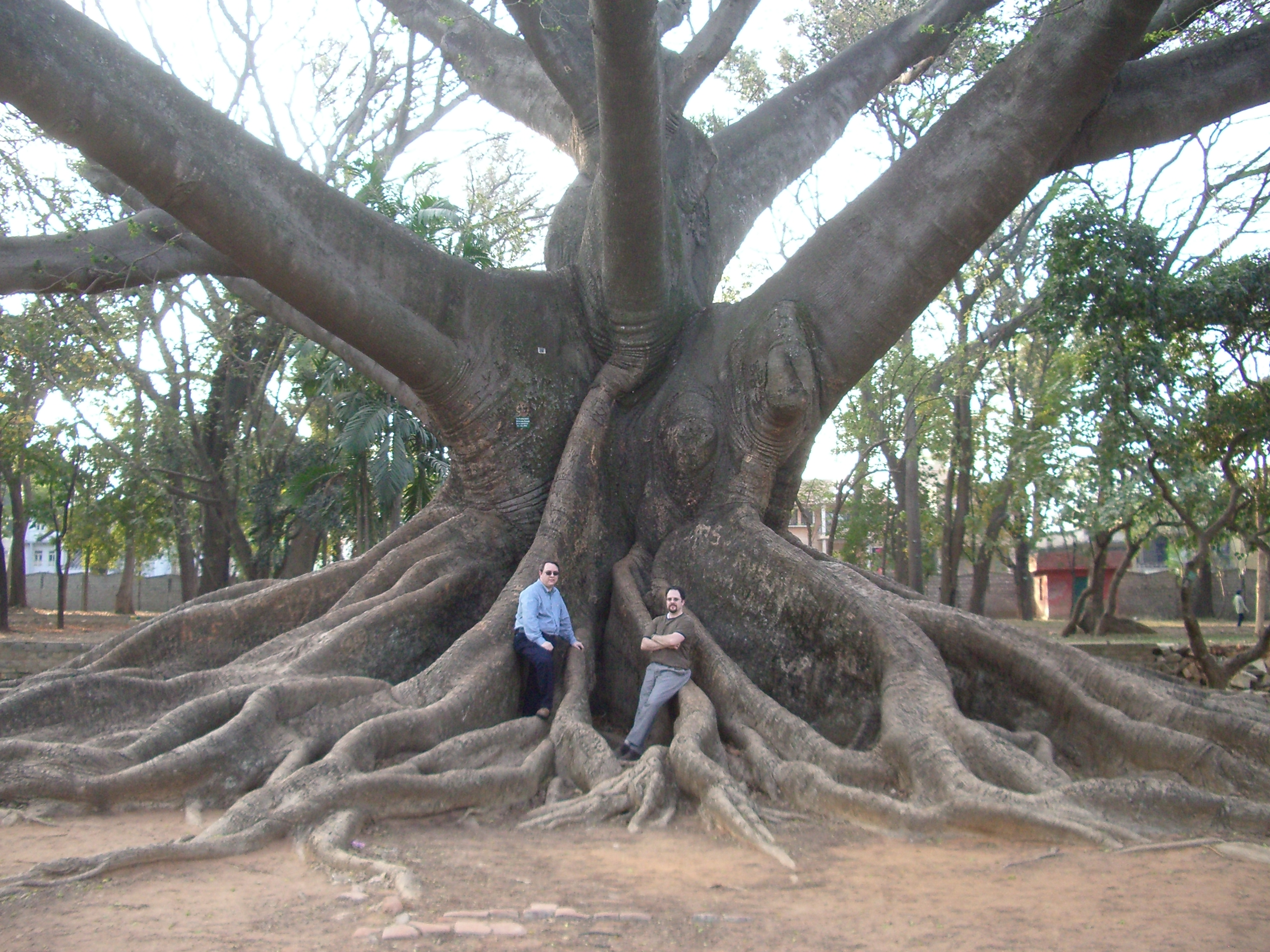
Buttress roots of a colossal cotton-silk kapok in Lal Bagh gardens in Bangalore (Bengaluru), India

Buttress roots, also known as plank roots or stilt roots, are large, wide roots on all sides of a shallowly rooted tree. Typically, they are found in nutrient-poor tropical forest soils that may not be very deep. They may prevent the tree from falling over, hence the name buttress.

Buttresses are tension elements, being larger on the side away from the stress of asymmetrical canopies. The roots may intertwine with buttress roots from other trees and create an intricate mesh, which may help support trees surrounding it. They can grow up to 9 metres (30 ft) tall, spread for 30 m (98 ft) above the soil, and then continue another 30 metres horizontally below ground level. When the roots spread horizontally, they are able to cover a wider area for collecting nutrients. They stay near the upper soil layer because all the main nutrients are found there.

== Notable and historic specimen trees with buttress roots ==
- Ceiba pentandra of Vieques, Puerto Rico
- Moreton Bay fig (Ficus macrophylla) in Queensland, Australia
- Jackfruit (Artocarpus heterophyllus), India
- Terminalia arjuna, India
- Koompassia excelsa, Southeast Asia

== Gallery ==
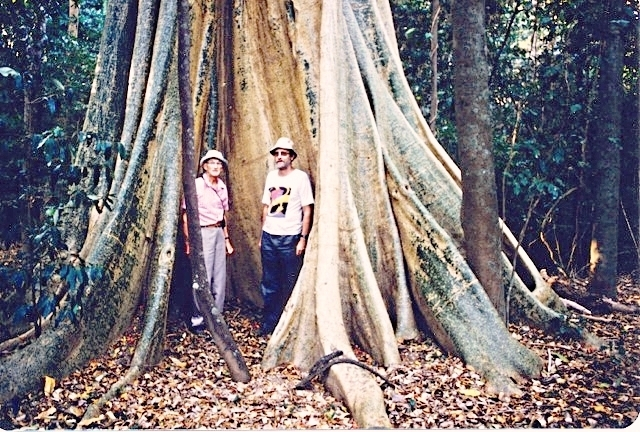
Buttress roots. Jensen's Crossing near Cooktown, Australia. 1988

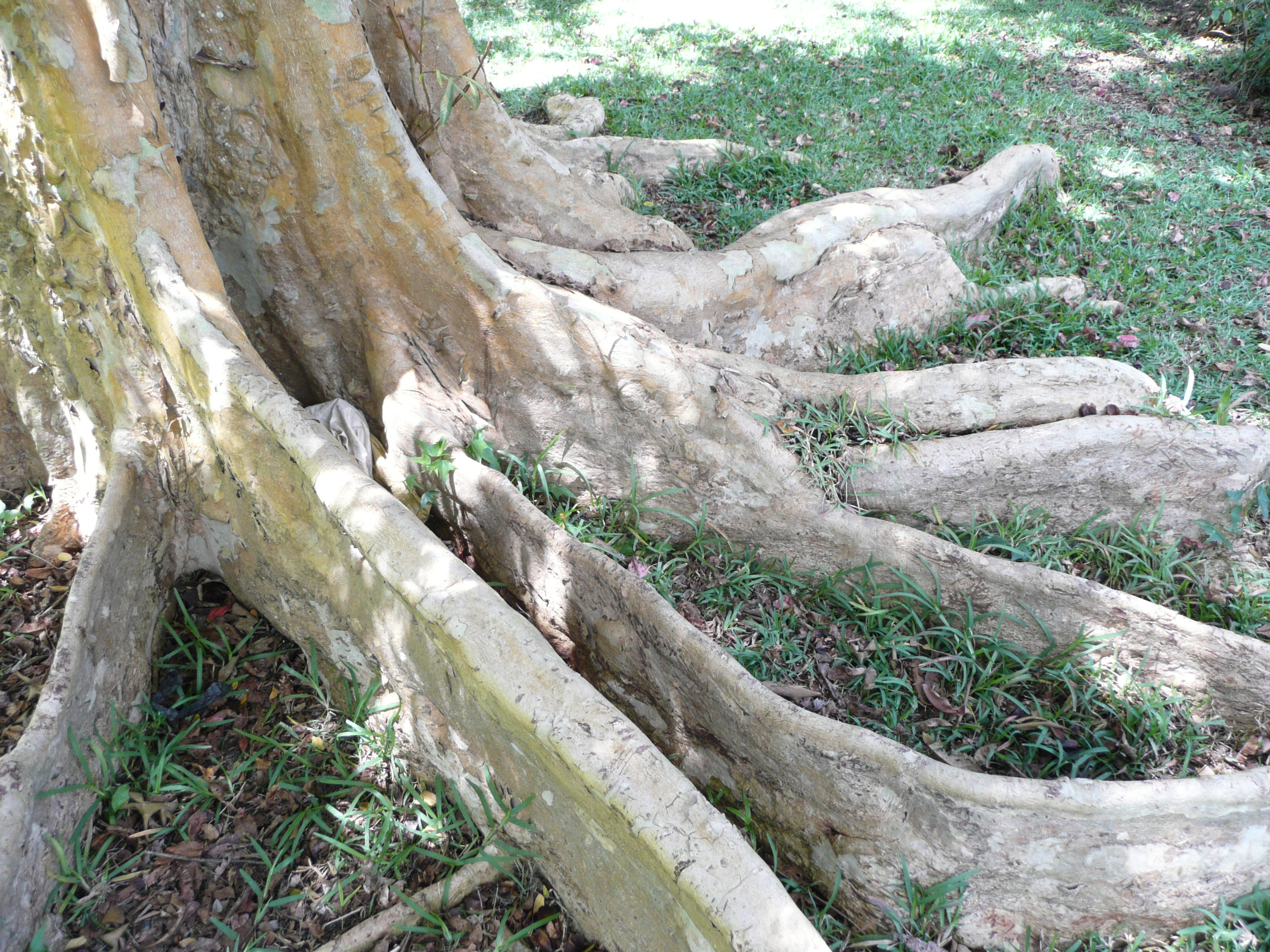
Buttress roots of Terminalia arjuna

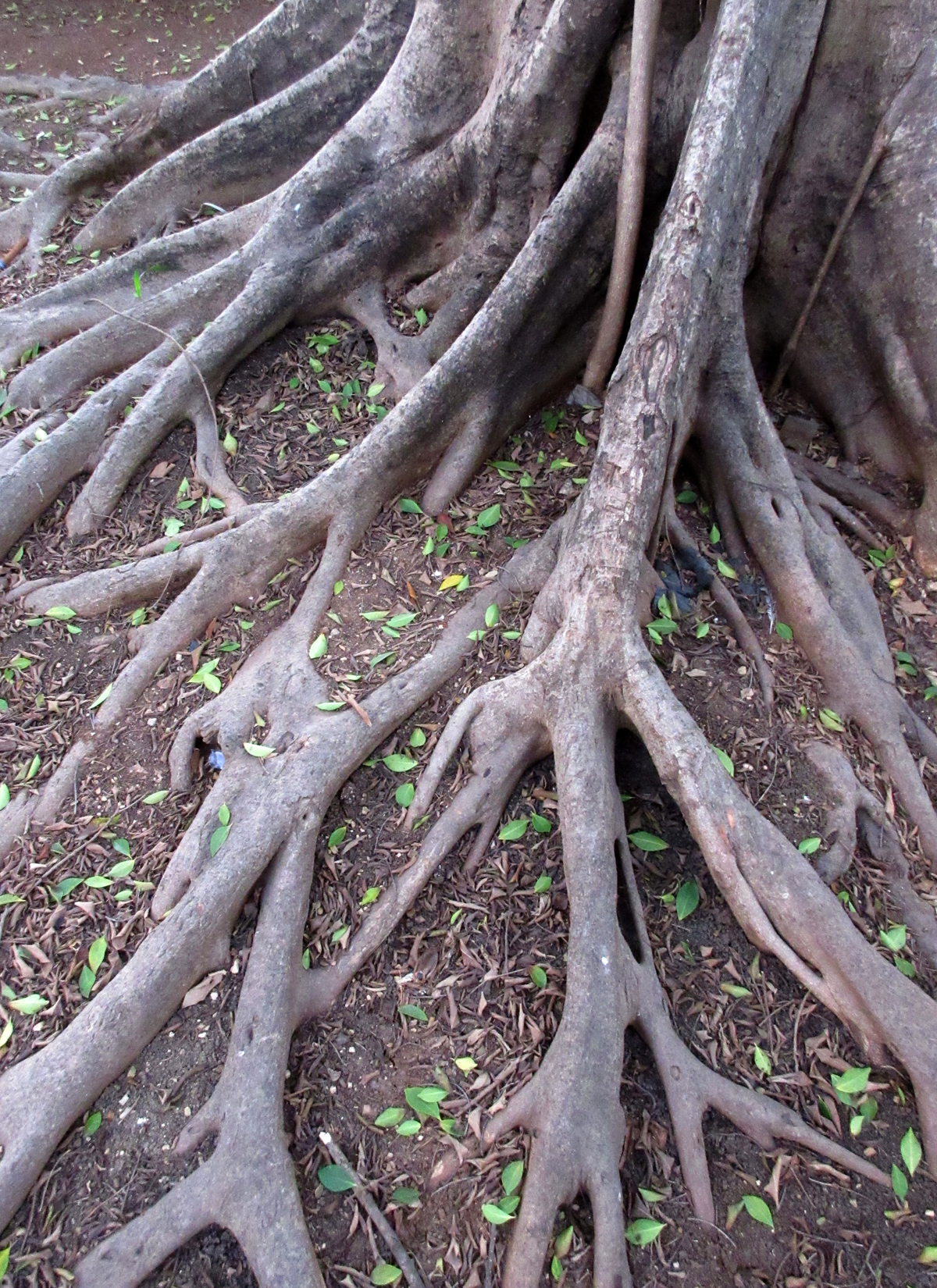
A buttress root system provides structural support.

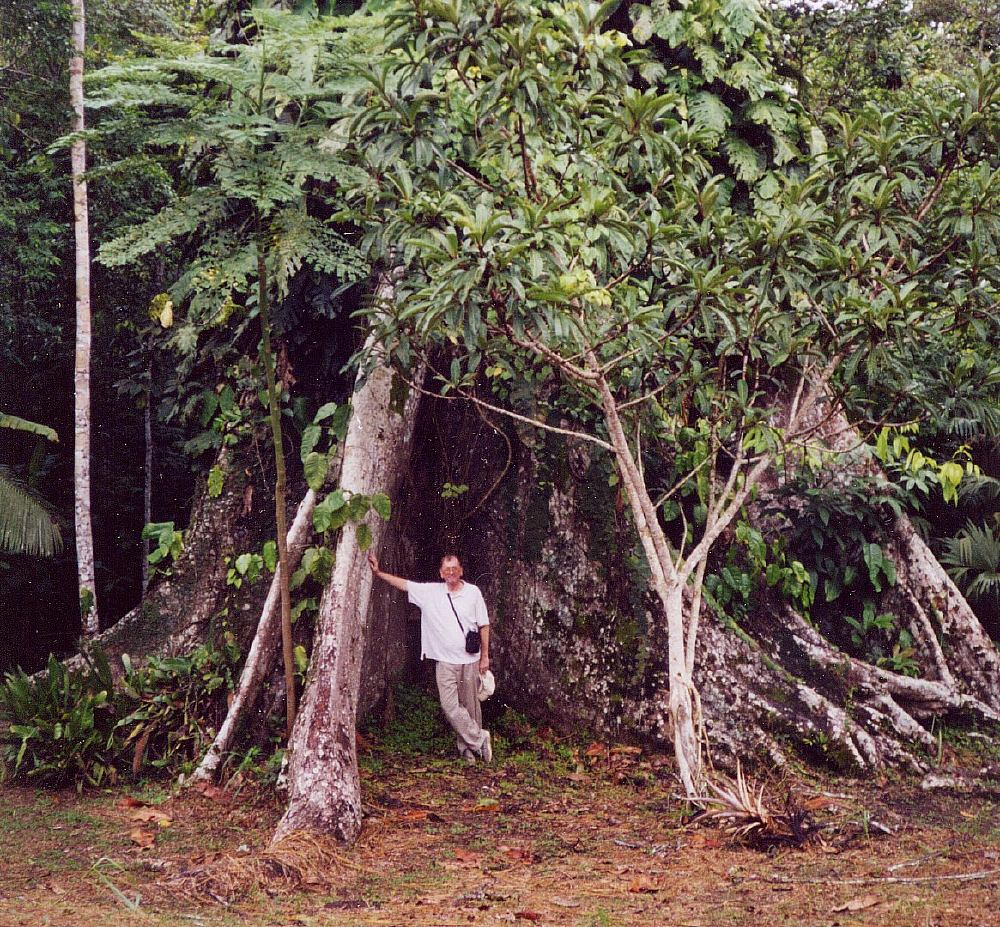
Buttress roots of an especially large Ceiba tree near shore of Amazon River, close to Iquitos, Peru

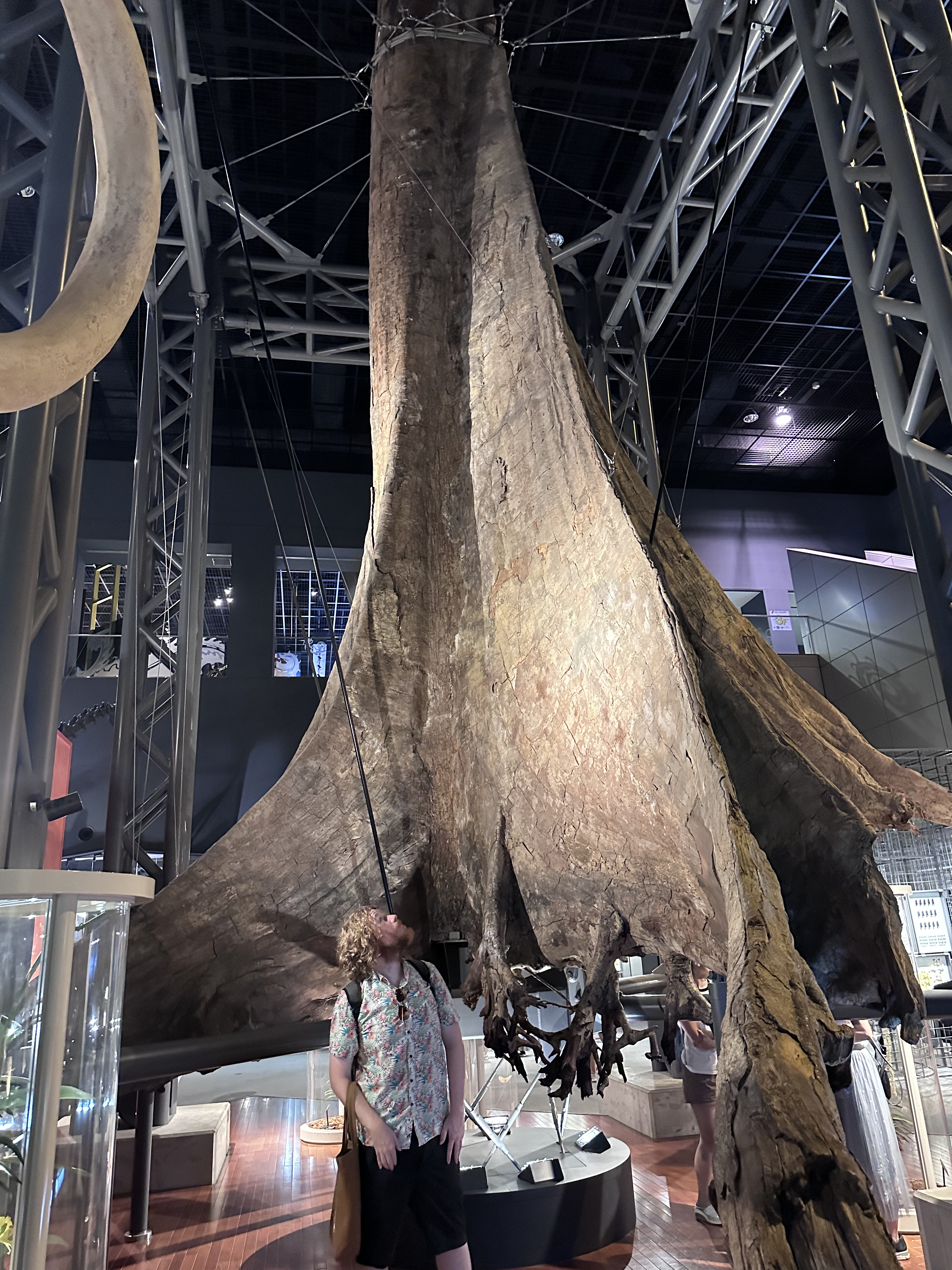
The large buttress roots of Koompassia excelsa

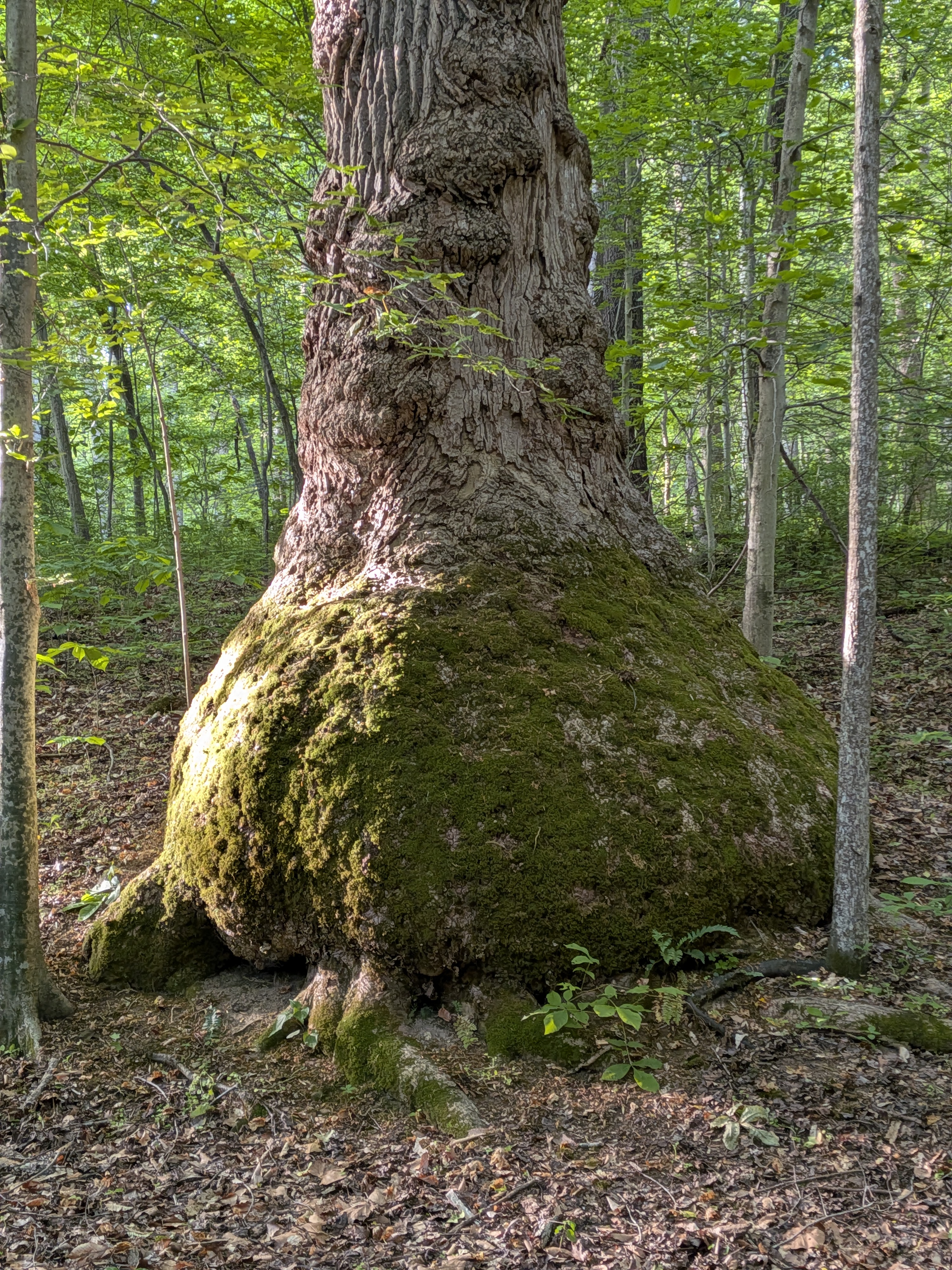
A bulbous buttress root
