= Peter Shaw Ashton =

British botanist (born 1934)

- Born: June 7, 1934 (age 92); Boscombe, Bournemouth, England
- Education: University of Cambridge
- Scientific career
- Fields: Botany
- Workplaces: Harvard University
- Author abbrev. (botany): P.S.Ashton

Peter Shaw Ashton (born 27 June 1934) is a British botanist and forest ecologist. He worked as the Charles Bullard Professor of Forestry at Harvard University from 1991 to 2005 and served as director of the Arnold Arboretum from 1978 to 1987.

== Life and career ==
Born in Boscombe, Bournemouth, England, Ashton received his B.A. in Biology (1956), M.A. in Biology (1960) and Ph.D. in Botany (1962) from the University of Cambridge. He has worked for many years on research projects to promote the conservation and sustainable use of tropical forests, and was instrumental in the project by the Center for Tropical Forest Science to develop a network of Forest Dynamic Plots that are surveyed regularly to sample the health of the forest. He won the Japan Prize for this in 2007.

In 1983, Ashton was elected a Fellow of the American Academy of Arts and Sciences. He was elected Honorary Fellow of the Association for Tropical Biology and Conservation (ATBC) during the ATBC Annual meeting held in Kunming, China, in 2006. In 2015 the ATBC created in his honor the Peter Ashton Prize, awarded annually to the outstanding article published in the journal Biotropica by a student. He was awarded the David Fairchild Medal for Plant Exploration in 2008.
