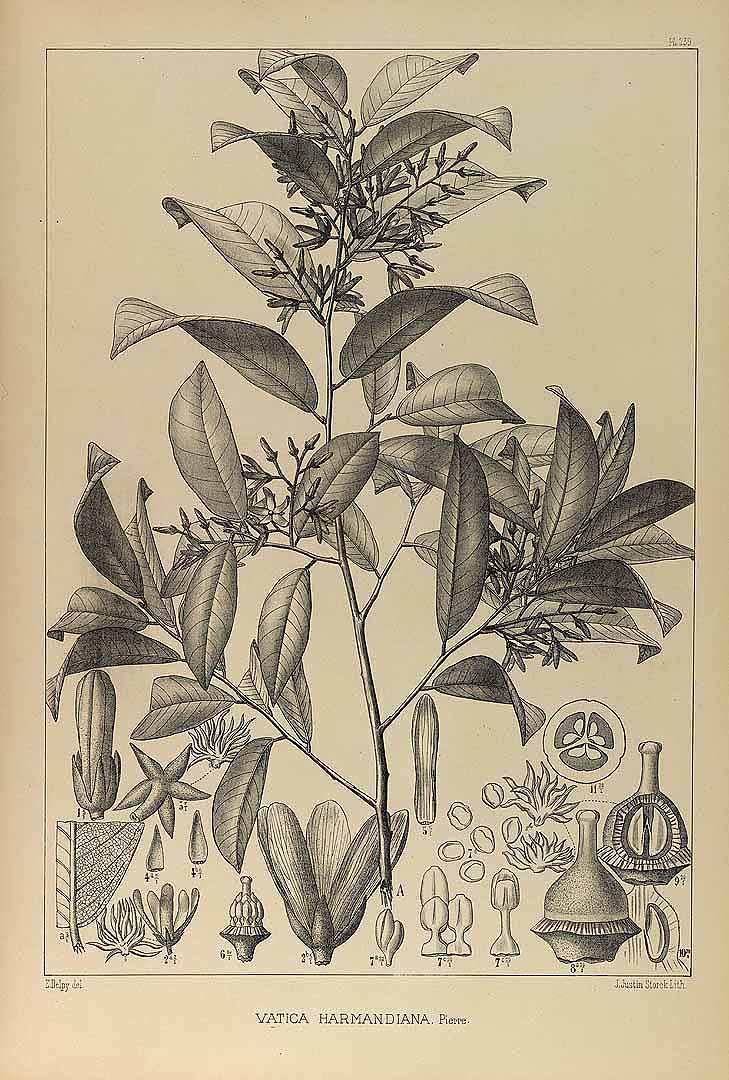

Conservation status
- Data Deficient (IUCN 3.1)

Scientific classification
- Kingdom: Plantae
- Clade: Tracheophytes
- Clade: Angiosperms
- Clade: Eudicots
- Clade: Rosids
- Order: Malvales
- Family: Dipterocarpaceae
- Genus: Vatica
- Species: V. harmandiana

Binomial name
- Vatica harmandiana Pierre

Synonyms
- Vatica cinerea King; Vatica lankaviensis Ridley; Synaptea cinerea (King) Ridley; Synaptea lancaviensis (Ridley) Ridley

= Vatica harmandiana =

Species of tree

Vatica harmandiana, also known by the synonym Vatica cinerea, is a species of plant in the family Dipterocarpaceae. It is a smallish tree native to Southeast Asia. It is the most common plant species in certain types of mature woodland habitat within its range and is furthermore common in disturbed secondary forests covering much of its range, nonetheless it was considered, along with most Dipterocarpaceae, to be endangered by the IUCN between 1998 and 2017. It is usually not commercially harvested except for local use.

== Description ==
=== Habit ===
A smallish tree up to 13 m (43 ft) high. Although it may grow into a well-shaped tree in moist and favourable conditions, in Malaysia it is more commonly known as a small tree clustering on exposed ridges, rocky cliffs near the coast, among limestone hills (karst formations) and found in abandoned agricultural scrubland. The trees are generally of less than 120 cm in girth, though 240 cm girth trees are said to occur. The trunk lacks buttresses and the bark is thin, brittle and minutely fissured (appears smooth from a short distance). The bark is light-coloured, with patches of darker and pastel colours, and falls off very old trees in irregular, roundish scales, leaving a dimpled surface. The wood is hard and fine-grained, containing scattered channels which exclude a clear, sticky resin. The sapwood is pale and termite-resistant. The young twigs are covered in a pale-coloured, puberulous layer at the tips which is shed as the twigs mature.

=== Leaves ===
The leaves are elliptic-lanceolate and narrow in width towards both ends, with a blunt apex. The leaves are about 8 cm (3.1 in) long and 4 cm (1.6 in) across with about 9 nerves, these being only slightly more prominent on the lower versus the upper surface. The petioles are usually around 1 cm in length, somewhat slender and covered with a few sparse, grey, tomentose hairs.

=== Flowers and fruit ===
The flowers are white, with petals about 2 cm long. The fruit is a winged nut; with a 5mm stalk and a globose nut surmounted by a ring of the scruffy tomentose remnants of the style, which is itself connected to the calyx. The calyx has two enlarged wings sized 4.5 x 1 cm and three, sometimes less, 1.3 cm, oblong, blunt or pointed lobes. On occasion a lobe or two may grow into a smaller 2.5 cm wing.

=== Cytology ===
The karyotype is 2n=22.

=== Similar species ===
The species has often been confused with Vatica odorata, being distinguished by leaves narrowing gradually to a blunt point (instead of being acuminate), the relatively longer petioles, and the less raised main venation. The young twigs and petioles are furthermore covered in pale-greyish scruff as opposed to reddish-brown scruff. According to King in his original 1893 description of this taxon, it is most similar to V. curtisii (now synonymised with V. odorata), especially in its fruit, but he distinguishes the taxa on the basis of this taxon having leaves with fewer and less prominent nerves.

== Taxonomy ==
Vatica harmandiana was first collected on the east bank of the Mekong river in lower Laos, then part of Siam, by Dr. François-Jules Harmand in the mid-1870s. This collection found its way to the herbarium of Jean Baptiste Louis Pierre in the botanical garden of Saigon, where Pierre first published about this tree under this name in 1886 in a book by Jean Marie Antoine de Lanessan on the economic plants of the French colonies (Siam being coerced into giving the French the region by this time). The name was bereft of a description and holotype and thus a nomen nudum, but Pierre rectified this situation in 1890, validating the species with the samples collected by Harmand as type and providing a short description of the plant and a detailed description of its wood in French. In 1891 he provided a detailed description of the pattern of vascular bundles in a cross-section of the petiole, believed to be a defining character among the dipterocarps at the time. According to Pierre, these trees were to be found growing in the lands stretching from the great lake of Tonlé Sap east to the banks of the Mekong.

In 1893, plants from northwestern peninsular Malaysia were described by George King as V. cinerea. The epithet cinerea was chosen by King to refer to the dull grey colour of the dried leaves of this plant in the herbarium specimens he studied and used to define the taxon (cinerea means 'ashy').

Up until 1982 Peter S. Ashton believed that the occurrence of the taxon V. cinerea was restricted to the regions first collated by Symington in 1943: the southern (historical) region of Tenasserim in Myanmar, peninsular Thailand and the northwestern peninsular Malaysian regions of Kedah, Perlis and the Langkawi islands. V. harmandiana was thought to occur in Thailand, Cambodia, lower Laos and southern Vietnam.

In 1990 the edition on Dipterocarpaceae in the Flore du Cambodge, du Laos et du Viêtnam V. cinerea was recognised to be a synonym of V. harmandiana. The Plant Resources of South-East Asia (PROSEA) project followed this synonymy when summarising the state of research in this species in their 1993 work on the timber resources of Southeast Asia, however, writing the species assessment for the IUCN in 1998, Ashton appears to have added the distribution of V. harmandiana to V. cinerea and omitted all mention of V. harmandiana as a synonym, independent species or otherwise. He repeated this mistake in 2004 in the revised edition of Symington's manual of peninsular Malaysian dipterocarps. Due to this taxonomic inconsistency the status of the species and its distribution has been confused. The Malaysia Plant Red List (2010), the IUCN (2017) and numerous researchers in individual papers have continued to follow Ashton's erroneous interpretation, whereas for example Pauline Dy Phon, in a 2000 dictionary of the useful plants of Cambodia, uses V. cinerea as a synonym of V. harmandiana. Plants of the World Online follows this approach and considers V. cinerea to be a synonym. Both the Checklist of the Vascular Plants of Lao by Newman et al. in 2007, and the Flora of Thailand by Poona et al. in 2017, use the name V. harmandiana exclusively. The Malaysia Biodiversity Information System includes both taxa as occurring in Malaysia, but describes the extant population under the name V. cinerea.

The names V. faginea and V. astrotricha have been misapplied in the early 20th century to plants of this species growing in Myanmar, Thailand and elsewhere, both epithets later being synonymised with V. odorata. R. Pooma in 2002 proposed, based on herbarium vouchers from Thailand, that this taxon was actually part of a purported Vatica odorata-complex.

In his monograph on the genus Vatica in the Dutch East Indies (1927), Dirk Fok van Slooten proposes a system of subdividing the taxon into three subgenera based on the fruit characteristics. Using the scheme devised by van Slooten would place V. harmandiana with its fruit with two wings and three lobes in subgenus Synaptera. Ridley, in 1922, had already moved peninsular Malaysian Vatica subgenus Synaptera species to genus Synaptera (also sometimes (erroneously) spelled Sunaptera, i.e. in PROSEA, TPL), although his interpretation was not widely followed.

== Distribution ==
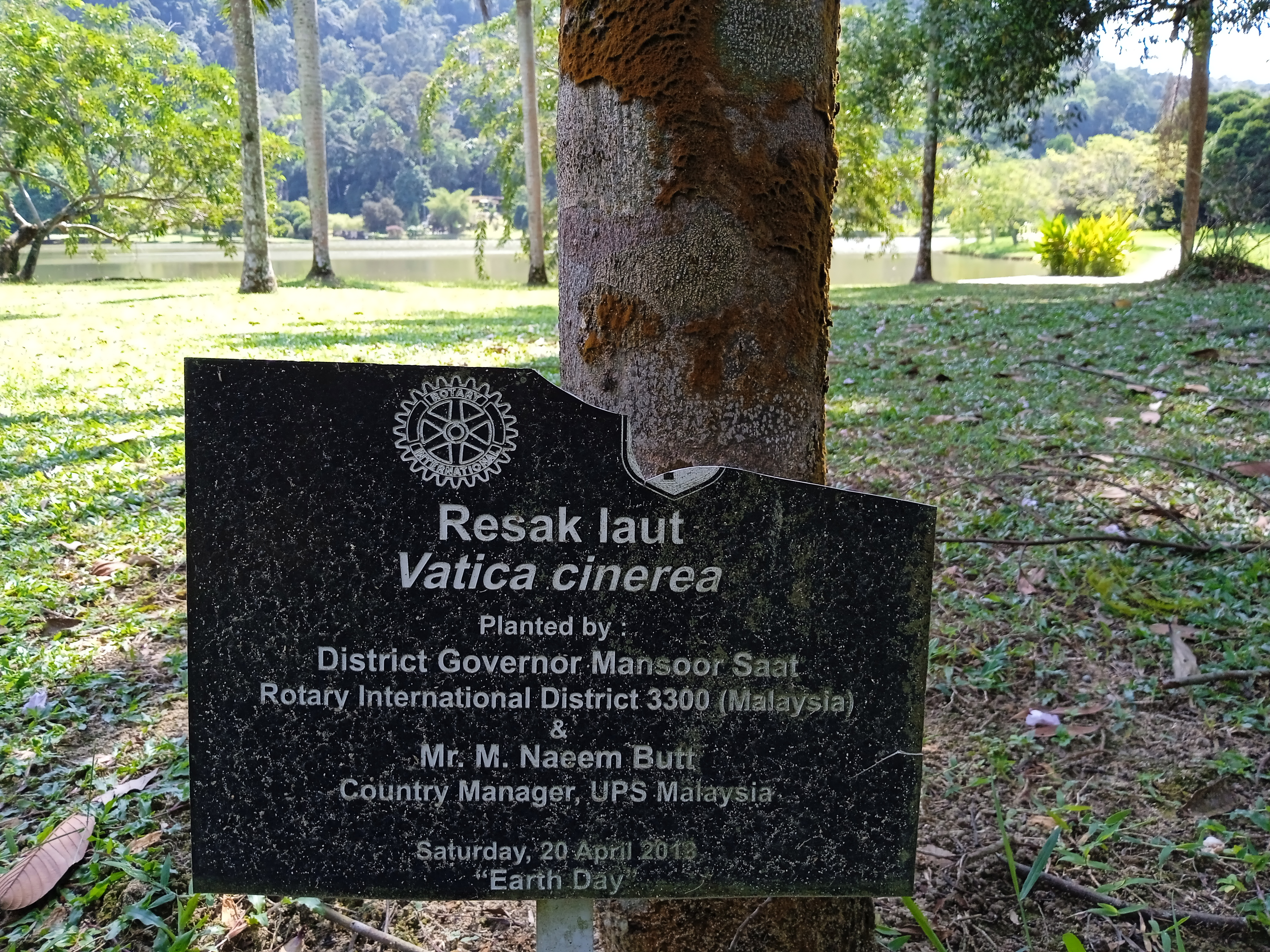
Vatica harmandiana in Malaysia.

According to the IUCN in 1998 it is found in Cambodia, Malaysia, Myanmar, Thailand, and Vietnam. Newman et al., writing for the IUCN in 2017, added Laos to its distribution.

=== Cambodia ===
Populations growing in Cambodia are considered Vatica harmandiana as of 2000.

=== Laos ===
By 2006, the Lao Tree Seed Programme had collections from the following localities: Ban Nakhangan, Parklai and Sainyabuli. It thus is known to occur in Laos in Sainyabuli Province in Parklai District and Sainyabuli District. The species was not listed in Checklist of the Vascular Plants of Lao by Newman et al. in 2007 (although the species Vatica harmandiana was), but Newman et al. considered it native to Laos in 2017.

=== Malaysia ===
The margins of its native distribution include northwesternmost parts of Malaysia: Kedah, Perlis, Langkawi island and adjacent islands. It is particularly common in much of Perlis in human-altered lands. The population on Langkawi was once known under the synonymised taxon name Vatica lankaviensis. Chua et al. (2010) add localities in Penang Island, northernmost Pahang and Perak to the Malaysian distribution, but Symington (1943) mentions that he considers southern collections such as those attributed to Perak (Kledang Saiong Forest Reserve, Teluk Sera) as "doubtful".

=== Myanmar ===
Typical of dry semi-deciduous woodlands in the southernmost regions of Myanmar in Tanintharyi Region, Mon State, Kayin State, and Taungoo District.

=== Thailand ===
Found in peninsular Thailand. Research in western Thailand in 2003 found it to be by far the most dominant component of the flora and the most common plant species in seasonal, dry, evergreen forests. Dry evergreen forests are found throughout Thailand in areas where the yearly rainfall is between 1,500–2,200mm.

=== Vietnam ===
It is believed to occur in Vietnam.

== Ecology ==
This plant flowers and then (usually, not always) fruits en masse; although flowering may be somewhat staggered among individual trees, the fruiting usually occurs together with its neighbouring conspecifics. Some years may see no flowering. Enormous amounts of flowers are grown, but only a few flowers grow into fruit in an inflorescence. Pollinators are unknown. As with other similar plants, the mass fruiting is thought to protect against predation by glutting potential seed predators, during bad years with few fruit almost no seedlings may arise. The fruit of this plant are not fleshy, but the single seed is oily. Although the fruit has wings and somewhat smaller fruit along with other Vatica species in section Synaptera, it is unable to disperse far in its path down to the forest floor. Many fruit may get caught in branches and die. The seed is recalcitrant, losing viability in a few weeks or less. Potential seed predators known from other dipterocarps are parakeets attacking the ripe fruit while still on the tree, and ants and wild hogs foraging on the fallen fruit. The seeds are parasitised by the generalist larvae of species of weevils belonging to the genera Alcydodes and Nonophyes and the scolytid beetle genus Poecileps and possibly some Lepidoptera. The percentage of seeds lost through beetle predation can be very high, despite these beetles usually having rather long lifecycles of some 18 months. Those few seeds which escape all this usually germinate directly on the forest floor, forming characteristic carpets of seedlings directly under the mother tree after a good year. Saplings have somewhat differently shaped leaves than the adult trees, and can usually stand some heavy shade, but require some flecks of sunlight a day and generally almost all saplings die off within a few years. This species is quick to exploit openings in the forest and can form clumps of similarly aged trees due to this.

=== Habitat ===
This is primarily a tree of seasonal, dry, evergreen forests of southern Myanmar eastward. In Thailand it is often a dominant subcanopy, and the most common, tree in these woodlands. It is most common here on slopes, but can also often be found in all sub-habitat types. The population structure in these mature woodlands indicate it is a climax plant species with active sapling recruitment, unlike the other, larger and more rare Dipterocarpaceae species found here, which require some disturbance to the forest to maintain recruitment. It shares this habitat with species such as Afzelia xylocarpa, Hydnocarpus spp., the dipterocarps Anisoptera costata, Dipterocarpus alatus, Hopea odorata and Vatica odorata, the bamboos Bambusa spp. and Gigantochloa spp., and the rattan Calamus.

Unlike most Vatica or other Dipterocarpaceae species this is a plant which can thrive in exposed conditions. It adapts readily to drier and more unfavourable conditions in northernmost Malaysia and is found here on exposed ridges, rocky coastal headlands and on limestone hills. It is furthermore common in degraded Schima-bamboo woodlands typically arising from constant and repeated human disturbance, to which most of the original tropical lowland evergreen rainforests in northernmost Malaysia had been converted by the 1930s, both as a relic from earlier primary forest and as a pioneer. Its presence among the exposed limestone (karst) formations of Langkawi, Perlis and northern Kedah in Malaysia is typical of species normally having a more northerly distribution in drier semi-deciduous forests, where they are adapted to seasonal droughts. Such species include the dominant tree Hopea ferrea, and other dipterocarps such as Shorea roxburghii and S. siamensis. In such limestone outcrops it grows in deep soil pockets in gullies or holes.

It appears to have better resistance to forest fires compared to other dipterocarps and will often survive slash-and-burn agricultural operations.

In Malaysia it has been collected growing from sea level to over 700m in altitude.

== Uses ==
The resinous lumber yielded by this species is of good quality but is not, or very rarely, traded internationally, as the trees are generally of small stature. Furthermore, the wood is denser than water, which sinks logs and thus makes this timber more difficult to transport. Vatica timber is in general known as (kayu) resak in Malaysia. It is used locally in areas where it is native in Malaysia for house posts and other general construction purposes, being hard, heavy, durable and resistant to termites.

== Conservation ==
In 1998 Peter S. Ashton, assessing the population of this taxon for the IUCN, changed its conservation status from "not threatened" to "endangered", making this change as Ashton believed that because the species was most likely roughly native to a lowland forest habitat and as according to him much of this habitat had been developed for human use in the previous decades it was thus endangered. In the 2004 revised edition of Symington's Foresters' Manual of Dipterocarps Ashton & S. Appanah downgrade the species to "vulnerable" status as they did not find it particularly threatened. In 2017 the population was reassessed for the IUCN and its conservation status was changed to "data deficient" as the assessors considered that there had been no credible studies to date into its population size or any changes to it.

By 2006, the Lao Tree Seed Programme (LTSP) had 21 mother trees in ex situ collections planted out on 222 hectares grown from seed collected from three localities: Ban Nakhangan, Parklai and Sainyabuli.

The distribution of this species dips just over the northern border into northernmost peninsular Malaysia, initially considered globally endangered (1998), the status of the population here was downgraded in 2010, along with most dipterocarps, to "near threatened" in the Malaysia Plant Red List - Peninsular Malaysian Dipterocarpaceae (2010), as a better methodology was applied. The population of the species is able to adapt to drier, disturbed and more open areas and may have profited from human disturbance in Malaysia. It has been collected in the following protected Forest Reserves in Malaysia: Mt. Jerai, Mt. Machincang, Mata Ayer, Bukit Tangga and Kledang Saiong. A live accession, an ex situ collection, is grown at the arboretum of the Forest Research Institute Malaysia.

It is the most common tree in parts of Thailand. It is protected within Huai Kha Khaeng Wildlife Sanctuary.

Most of the known population in Vietnam is found protected within reserves.

== Vernacular names ==
In Malaysian it is locally known as resak or resak laut: resak is a generic name for most Vatica species in Malay, laut means 'sea' in Malay and refers to the areas it is commonly found. Starting in the early 1930s the authorities at the British colonial Forestry Department at Kepong attempted to standardise the often contradictory or unspecific vernacular names of Malay trees and designated the preferred common name of resak laut. Nonetheless Vatica maritima of Borneo is also known as resak laut. The IUCN uses the name kayu resak padi, which means 'rice resak lumber/wood' in Malay.

The vernacular names táu nước, táu mật and làu táu have been recorded for Vietnamese for this plant.
