= Vatica obovata =

Conservation status
- Endangered (IUCN 3.1)

Scientific classification
- Kingdom: Plantae
- Clade: Tracheophytes
- Clade: Angiosperms
- Clade: Eudicots
- Clade: Rosids
- Order: Malvales
- Family: Dipterocarpaceae
- Genus: Vatica
- Species: V. obovata

Binomial name
- Vatica obovata Slooten

Species of tree

Vatica obovata is a species of flowering plant in the family Dipterocarpaceae. It is a tree endemic to Sumatra. It is an endangered species threatened by habitat loss.
