= Vatica acrocarpa =

Conservation status
- Least Concern (IUCN 2.3)

Scientific classification
- Kingdom: Plantae
- Clade: Tracheophytes
- Clade: Angiosperms
- Clade: Eudicots
- Clade: Rosids
- Order: Malvales
- Family: Dipterocarpaceae
- Genus: Vatica
- Species: V. acrocarpa

Binomial name
- Vatica acrocarpa Slooten

Synonyms
- Vatica umbonata subsp. acrocarpa (Slooten) P.S.Ashton

Species of flowering plant

Vatica acrocarpa is a species of flowering plant in the family Dipterocarpaceae. It is a tree native to Borneo, Peninsular Malaysia, and Peninsular Thailand.

The species was first described by Dirk Fok van Slooten in 1942.
