= Vatica granulata =

Conservation status
- Least Concern (IUCN 3.1)

Scientific classification
- Kingdom: Plantae
- Clade: Embryophytes
- Clade: Tracheophytes
- Clade: Spermatophytes
- Clade: Angiosperms
- Clade: Eudicots
- Clade: Rosids
- Order: Malvales
- Family: Dipterocarpaceae
- Genus: Vatica
- Species: V. granulata

Binomial name
- Vatica granulata Slooten

Species of tree

Vatica granulata is a tree in the family Dipterocarpaceae, native to Borneo. The specific epithet means 'like small seeds', referring to the nut surface.

== Description ==
Vatica granulata grows up to 30 metres (100 ft) tall, with a trunk diameter of up to 70 cm (30 in). Its coriaceous leaves measure up to 20 cm (8 in) long. The ovoid nuts have a coarse, granular surface and measure up to 4 cm (2 in) long. The timber is used in furniture and construction.

== Distribution and habitat ==
Vatica granulata is endemic to Borneo. Its habitat is mainly on ridges in mixed dipterocarp forest, at elevations of 500–1,700 m (1,600–5,600 ft).
