= Vatica javanica =

Conservation status
- Vulnerable (IUCN 3.1)

Scientific classification
- Kingdom: Plantae
- Clade: Embryophytes
- Clade: Tracheophytes
- Clade: Angiosperms
- Clade: Eudicots
- Clade: Rosids
- Order: Malvales
- Family: Dipterocarpaceae
- Genus: Vatica
- Species: V. javanica

Binomial name
- Vatica javanica Slooten

Subspecies
- Vatica javanica subsp. javanica; Vatica javanica subsp. scaphifolia (Kosterm.) P.S.Ashton

Synonyms
- Sunaptea javanica (Slooten) Kosterm.; synonyms of subsp. scaphifolia: Sunaptea scaphifolia (Kosterm.) Kosterm.; Vatica scaphifolia Kosterm.

Species of flowering plant

Vatica javanica is a species of dipterocarp tree native to western Java and southeastern Borneo. It is known as Kayu Tenjo in western Java. It can grow up to 46 metres tall with a trunk up to 99 cm in diameter at breast height. It is an upper canopy tree in lowland and mid-elevation mixed dipterocarp tropical rain forests, mostly on hillsides and ridges with sandy soils.

Two subspecies are accepted:

- Vatica javanica subsp. javanica – western Java
- Vatica javanica subsp. scaphifolia (Kosterm.) P.S.Ashton – southeastern Borneo

Subspecies javanica is known only from Mount Halimun in Garut Regency of western Java and Brebres in Central Java. Subspecies scaphifolia is native to Kalimantan in southeastern Borneo.

The IUCN Red List assesses the species as Vulnerable. Both subspecies are individually assessed as Critically Endangered.

The species was described by Dirk Fok van Slooten in 1940.
