= Quercus chrysotricha =

Conservation status
- Endangered (IUCN 3.1)

Scientific classification
- Kingdom: Plantae
- Clade: Embryophytes
- Clade: Tracheophytes
- Clade: Spermatophytes
- Clade: Angiosperms
- Clade: Eudicots
- Clade: Rosids
- Order: Fagales
- Family: Fagaceae
- Genus: Quercus
- Subgenus: Quercus subg. Cerris
- Section: Quercus sect. Cyclobalanopsis
- Species: Q. chrysotricha

Binomial name
- Quercus chrysotricha A.Camus

Species of plant

Quercus chrysotricha is a species of oak endemic to Borneo, where it is known only from Mount Dulit in Sarawak. It is placed in Quercus subgenus Cerris, section Cyclobalanopsis.

== Range and habitat ==
Quercus chrysotricha known from two locations on Mount Dulit, where it grows in lower montane rain forest between 1,200 and 1,300 meters elevation. Its specific habitat has been described as closed-canopy mossy forests, closed-canopy montane mixed dipterocarp forests, or open swampy mossy forests.
