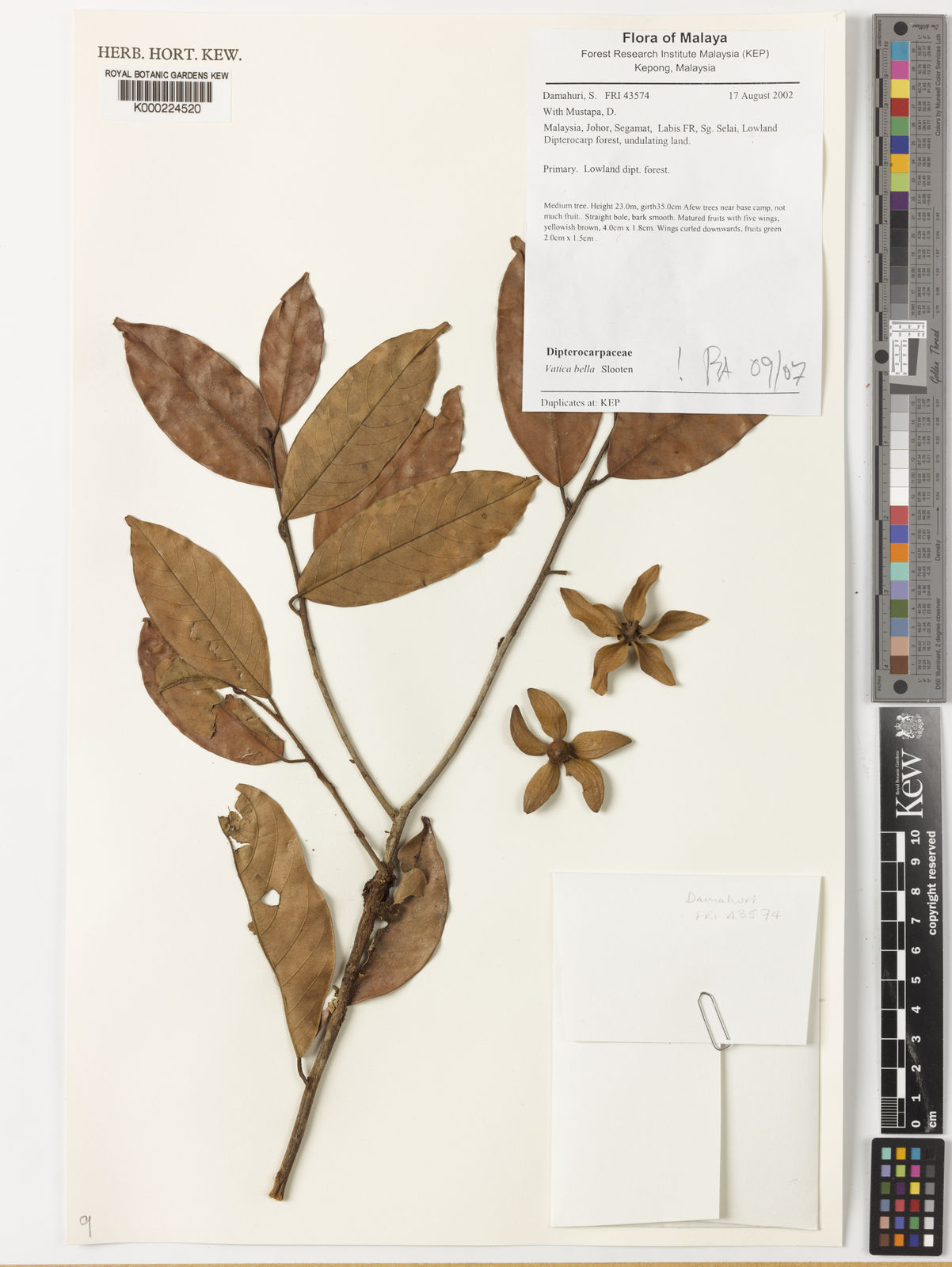

Conservation status
- Data Deficient (IUCN 3.1)

Scientific classification
- Kingdom: Plantae
- Clade: Embryophytes
- Clade: Tracheophytes
- Clade: Angiosperms
- Clade: Eudicots
- Clade: Rosids
- Order: Malvales
- Family: Dipterocarpaceae
- Genus: Vatica
- Species: V. bella

Binomial name
- Vatica bella Slooten

= Vatica bella =

Species of tree native to Malaysia

Vatica bella is a species of plant in the family Dipterocarpaceae. It is a tree endemic to Peninsular Malaysia. In 2017, it was categorized as a critically endangered species threatened by habitat loss. As of 2026, it is listed as Data Deficient.
