= Vatica albiramis =

Conservation status
- Least Concern (IUCN 3.1)

Scientific classification
- Kingdom: Plantae
- Clade: Tracheophytes
- Clade: Angiosperms
- Clade: Eudicots
- Clade: Rosids
- Order: Malvales
- Family: Dipterocarpaceae
- Genus: Vatica
- Species: V. albiramis

Binomial name
- Vatica albiramis Slooten

Species of tree native to Borneo

Vatica albiramis is a tree in the family Dipterocarpaceae, endemic to Borneo. The specific epithet means 'white twigs'.

== Description ==
Vatica albiramis grows up to 25 metres (80 ft) tall, with a trunk diameter of up to 35 cm (10 in). Its coriaceous leaves are elliptic to lanceolate and measure up to 20 cm (8 in) long. The inflorescences bear yellow flowers. The fruits are ovate and measure up to 1.2 cm (0.5 in) long.

== Distribution and habitat ==
Vatica albiramis is endemic to Borneo. Its habitat is mainly on ridges in dipterocarp forest, at elevations to 1,400 m (4,600 ft).
