= Vatica stapfiana =

Conservation status
- Vulnerable (IUCN 3.1)

Scientific classification
- Kingdom: Plantae
- Clade: Tracheophytes
- Clade: Angiosperms
- Clade: Eudicots
- Clade: Rosids
- Order: Malvales
- Family: Dipterocarpaceae
- Genus: Vatica
- Species: V. stapfiana

Binomial name
- Vatica stapfiana (King) Slooten

Synonyms
- Pachynocarpus stapfianus King; Pachynocarpus grandiflorus Ridl.

Species of tree

Vatica stapfiana is a species of flowering plant in the family Dipterocarpaceae. It is found in Sumatra, Peninsular Malaysia, and Thailand. This tree is an Vulnerable species threatened by habitat loss.
