= Vatica endertii =

Conservation status
- Endangered (IUCN 3.1)

Scientific classification
- Kingdom: Plantae
- Clade: Embryophytes
- Clade: Tracheophytes
- Clade: Spermatophytes
- Clade: Angiosperms
- Clade: Eudicots
- Clade: Rosids
- Order: Malvales
- Family: Dipterocarpaceae
- Genus: Vatica
- Species: V. endertii

Binomial name
- Vatica endertii Slooten

Synonyms
- Sunaptea endertii (Slooten) Kosterm.

Species of tree

Vatica endertii is a tree in the family Dipterocarpaceae, native to Borneo. It is named for the Dutch botanist F. H. Endert.

== Description ==
Vatica endertii grows up to 30 metres (100 ft) tall, with a trunk diameter of up to 60 cm (24 in). Its chartaceous leaves are obovate or oblong and measure up to 14 cm (6 in) long. The fruits measure up to 8 cm (3 in) long.

== Distribution and habitat ==
Vatica endertii is endemic to Borneo. Its habitat is mixed dipterocarp forest, at elevations to 1,100 m (3,600 ft).

== Conservation ==
Vatica endertii has been assessed as endangered on the IUCN Red List. It is threatened by logging for its timber, which is used for furniture and buildings. The species' habitat is threatened by conversion of land for agriculture. The species does not occur in protected areas.
