= Vatica micrantha =

Conservation status
- Least Concern (IUCN 3.1)

Scientific classification
- Kingdom: Plantae
- Clade: Embryophytes
- Clade: Tracheophytes
- Clade: Spermatophytes
- Clade: Angiosperms
- Clade: Eudicots
- Clade: Rosids
- Order: Malvales
- Family: Dipterocarpaceae
- Genus: Vatica
- Species: V. micrantha

Binomial name
- Vatica micrantha Slooten

Synonyms
- Sunaptea micrantha (Slooten) Kosterm.

Species of tree

Vatica micrantha is a tree in the family Dipterocarpaceae, native to Borneo. The specific epithet means 'small flowers'.

== Description ==
Vatica micrantha grows up to 35 metres (110 ft) tall, with a trunk diameter of up to 60 cm (24 in). Its coriaceous leaves are elliptic to lanceolate and measure up to 16 cm (6 in) long. The inflorescences bear cream-coloured flowers.

== Distribution and habitat ==
Vatica micrantha is endemic to Borneo. Its habitat is in mixed dipterocarp forest.
