= Vatica yeechongii =

Conservation status
- Critically Endangered (IUCN 3.1)

Scientific classification
- Kingdom: Plantae
- Clade: Embryophytes
- Clade: Tracheophytes
- Clade: Angiosperms
- Clade: Eudicots
- Clade: Rosids
- Order: Malvales
- Family: Dipterocarpaceae
- Genus: Vatica
- Species: V. yeechongii

Binomial name
- Vatica yeechongii Saw

Species of flowering plant

Vatica yeechongii is a species of dipterocarp tree endemic to Selangor and Negeri Sembilan states of Peninsular Malaysia. It grows up to 21 metres tall. It is known from two locations, Sungai Tekala Recreational Forest in Sungai Lalang Forest Reserve, Selangor and Setul Forest Reserve in Negeri Sembilan, where it grows in lowland dipterocarp rain forests from 70 to 200 metres elevation. Fewer than 10 mature trees were found in Selangor, and over 70 in Negeri Sembilan. The IUCN Red List assesses the species as Critically Endangered.

The species was described by Leng Guan Saw in 2002.
