= Vatica maritima =

Conservation status
- Vulnerable (IUCN 3.1)

Scientific classification
- Kingdom: Plantae
- Clade: Embryophytes
- Clade: Tracheophytes
- Clade: Spermatophytes
- Clade: Angiosperms
- Clade: Eudicots
- Clade: Rosids
- Order: Malvales
- Family: Dipterocarpaceae
- Genus: Vatica
- Species: V. maritima

Binomial name
- Vatica maritima Slooten

Synonyms
- Sunaptea maritima (Slooten) Kosterm.

Species of tree

Vatica maritima is a tree in the family Dipterocarpaceae, native to Borneo and the Philippines. The specific epithet maritima means "of the sea", referring to species' habitat.

== Description ==
Vatica maritima grows up to 25 metres (80 ft) tall, with a trunk diameter of up to 35 cm (14 in). Its coriaceous leaves are cuneate to obovate and measure up to 16 cm (6 in) long. The inflorescences bear cream flowers.

== Distribution and habitat ==
Vatica maritima is native to Borneo and the Philippines. Its habitat is on headlands near the sea.

== Conservation ==
Vatica maritima has been assessed as vulnerable on the IUCN Red List. In Borneo, it is threatened by illegal logging for its timber and by conversion of land for plantations. In the Philippines, it is threatened by changing agriculture patterns.
