= Vatica nitens =

Conservation status
- Near Threatened (IUCN 3.1)

Scientific classification
- Kingdom: Plantae
- Clade: Tracheophytes
- Clade: Angiosperms
- Clade: Eudicots
- Clade: Rosids
- Order: Malvales
- Family: Dipterocarpaceae
- Genus: Vatica
- Species: V. nitens

Binomial name
- Vatica nitens King

Synonyms
- Sunaptea nitens (King) Ridl.

Species of tree

Vatica nitens is a species of flowering plant in the family Dipterocarpaceae. It is a tree native to Peninsular Thailand, Peninsular Malaysia, Sumatra, and Borneo. It is an endangered species threatened by habitat loss.
