= Vatica chevalieri =

Conservation status
- Data Deficient (IUCN 3.1)

Scientific classification
- Kingdom: Plantae
- Clade: Tracheophytes
- Clade: Angiosperms
- Clade: Eudicots
- Clade: Rosids
- Order: Malvales
- Family: Dipterocarpaceae
- Genus: Vatica
- Species: V. chevalieri

Binomial name
- Vatica chevalieri (Gagnep.) Smitinand

Synonyms
- Brachypodandra chevalieri Gagnep.

Species of flowering plant

Vatica chevalieri is a species of flowering plant in the family Dipterocarpaceae. It is a tree endemic to northern Vietnam.

The species was first described as Brachypodandra chevalieri by François Gagnepain in 1948. In 1990 Tem Smitinand placed the species in the genus Vatica as V. chevalieri.
