= Vatica chartacea =

Conservation status
- Endangered (IUCN 3.1)

Scientific classification
- Kingdom: Plantae
- Clade: Embryophytes
- Clade: Tracheophytes
- Clade: Spermatophytes
- Clade: Angiosperms
- Clade: Eudicots
- Clade: Rosids
- Order: Malvales
- Family: Dipterocarpaceae
- Genus: Vatica
- Species: V. chartacea

Binomial name
- Vatica chartacea P.S.Ashton

Species of tree

Vatica chartacea is a tree in the family Dipterocarpaceae, native to Borneo. The specific epithet chartacea means "papery", referring to the leaves.

== Description ==
Vatica chartacea grows as a medium-sized tree. Its chartaceous leaves are oblong to obovate and measure up to 25 cm (10 in) long. The inflorescences bear cream flowers.

== Distribution and habitat ==
Vatica chartacea is endemic to Borneo. Its habitat is mixed dipterocarp forests on lowland hills, in wet areas and by rivers.

== Conservation ==
Vatica chartacea has been assessed as endangered on the IUCN Red List. It is threatened by land conversion for plantations and by logging for its timber.
