= Vatica globosa =

Conservation status
- Endangered (IUCN 3.1)

Scientific classification
- Kingdom: Plantae
- Clade: Embryophytes
- Clade: Tracheophytes
- Clade: Spermatophytes
- Clade: Angiosperms
- Clade: Eudicots
- Clade: Rosids
- Order: Malvales
- Family: Dipterocarpaceae
- Genus: Vatica
- Species: V. globosa

Binomial name
- Vatica globosa P.S.Ashton

Species of tree

Vatica globosa is a tree in the family Dipterocarpaceae, native to Borneo. The specific epithet globosa means "spherical", referring to the nuts.

== Description ==
Vatica globosa grows up to 20 metres (70 ft) tall, with a trunk diameter of up to 20 cm (8 in). Its coriaceous leaves are obovate and measure up to 18 cm (7 in) long. The inflorescences bear cream flowers. The nuts are round and measure up to 2 cm (0.8 in) in diameter.

== Distribution and habitat ==
Vatica globosa is endemic to Borneo. Its habitat is mixed dipterocarp forest, at elevations to 700 m (2,300 ft).

== Conservation ==
Vatica globosa has been assessed as endangered on the IUCN Red List. It is threatened mainly by shifting agricultural patterns and by palm oil plantations. In Kalimantan, the species is threatened by forest fires.
