= Vatica patentinervia =

Conservation status
- Critically Endangered (IUCN 3.1)

Scientific classification
- Kingdom: Plantae
- Clade: Embryophytes
- Clade: Tracheophytes
- Clade: Spermatophytes
- Clade: Angiosperms
- Clade: Eudicots
- Clade: Rosids
- Order: Malvales
- Family: Dipterocarpaceae
- Genus: Vatica
- Species: V. patentinervia

Binomial name
- Vatica patentinervia P.S.Ashton

Species of tree

Vatica patentinervia is a tree in the family Dipterocarpaceae, native to Borneo. The specific epithet patentinervia means 'widely divergent nerves', referring to the leaf veins.

== Description ==
Vatica patentinervia grows up to 35 metres (110 ft) tall, with a trunk diameter of up to 35 cm (14 in). Its coriaceous leaves are elliptic to obovate and measure up to 18 cm (7 in) long. The ellipsoid nuts have a glabrous surface and measure up to 1.2 cm (0.5 in) long.

== Distribution and habitat ==
Vatica patentinervia is endemic to Borneo. Its habitat is lowland mixed dipterocarp forest, at elevations to 400 m (1,300 ft).

== Conservation ==
Vatica patentinervia has been assessed as critically endangered on the IUCN Red List. It is threatened by conversion of land, principally for palm oil plantations. The species population is estimated at fewer than 50 trees.
