= Vatica paludosa =

Conservation status
- Endangered (IUCN 3.1)

Scientific classification
- Kingdom: Plantae
- Clade: Embryophytes
- Clade: Tracheophytes
- Clade: Angiosperms
- Clade: Eudicots
- Clade: Rosids
- Order: Malvales
- Family: Dipterocarpaceae
- Genus: Vatica
- Species: V. paludosa

Binomial name
- Vatica paludosa Kosterm.

Species of flowering plant

Vatica paludosa is a species of dipterocarp tree endemic to southwestern Sri Lanka. It grows up to 15 metres tall. It is native to lowland rain forest, where it grows in riverine areas and the edges of lowland flood plains and paddy fields. It occurs in small subpopulations which have been fragmented by land clearance for settlements and paddy fields. The IUCN Red List assesses the species as Endangered.

The species was described by André Joseph Guillaume Henri Kostermans in 1982.
