= Vatica mangachapoi =

Conservation status
- Vulnerable (IUCN 3.1)

Scientific classification
- Kingdom: Plantae
- Clade: Embryophytes
- Clade: Tracheophytes
- Clade: Spermatophytes
- Clade: Angiosperms
- Clade: Eudicots
- Clade: Rosids
- Order: Malvales
- Family: Dipterocarpaceae
- Genus: Vatica
- Species: V. mangachapoi

Binomial name
- Vatica mangachapoi Blanco

Synonyms
- List: Anisoptera mangachapoi (Blanco) DC.; Mocanera mangachapoi (Blanco) Blanco; Pteranthera sinensis Blume; Shorea mangachapoi (Blanco) Blume; Vatica apteranthera Blanco; Vatica hainanensis H.T. Chang & L.C. Wang

Species of plant

Vatica mangachapoi is a species of plant in the family Dipterocarpaceae.

It is a tree found in the Malesia and Indochina floristic regions: including Brunei, eastern China (Hainan Island), Malaysia, the Philippines, Thailand, and Vietnam.

== Further reference ==
- Yide, Li. "The Resource and Community Characteristics of Vatica mangachapoi Forest in Jianfengling National Nature Reserve, Hainan Island [J]." Scientia Silvae Sinicae 1 (2006).
- Lan, Guo-yu, Wei Chen, and Xiao-fei Zhou. "Community characteristics of Vatica mangachapoi forest of Bawangling in Hainan, South China." Acta Botanica Boreali-Occidentalia Sinica 27.9 (2007): 1861.
