= Dipterocarpus borneensis =

Conservation status
- Near Threatened (IUCN 3.1)

Scientific classification
- Kingdom: Plantae
- Clade: Tracheophytes
- Clade: Angiosperms
- Clade: Eudicots
- Clade: Rosids
- Order: Malvales
- Family: Dipterocarpaceae
- Genus: Dipterocarpus
- Species: D. borneensis

Binomial name
- Dipterocarpus borneensis Slooten

Species of tree

Dipterocarpus borneensis is a species of tree in the family Dipterocarpaceae. It is native to Borneo, Sumatra and Java.

Dipterocarpus borneensis grows as a large tree reaching up to 30 m (100 ft) in height. It primarily occurs in lowland heath forests but also in mixed swamp forests and on raised beaches and plateaus. It occurs at elevations up to 400 m (1,300 ft).
