= Vatica compressa =

Conservation status
- Vulnerable (IUCN 3.1)

Scientific classification
- Kingdom: Plantae
- Clade: Embryophytes
- Clade: Tracheophytes
- Clade: Spermatophytes
- Clade: Angiosperms
- Clade: Eudicots
- Clade: Rosids
- Order: Malvales
- Family: Dipterocarpaceae
- Genus: Vatica
- Species: V. compressa

Binomial name
- Vatica compressa P.S.Ashton

Synonyms
- Sunaptea compressa (P.S.Ashton) Kosterm.

Species of tree

Vatica compressa is a tree in the family Dipterocarpaceae, native to Borneo.

The species was described by Peter Shaw Ashton in 1967. The specific epithet compressa means "compressed", referring to the twig when young.

== Description ==
Vatica compressa grows up to 30 metres (100 ft) tall, with a trunk diameter of up to 35 cm (14 in). Its coriaceous leaves are elliptic to ovate and measure up to 19 cm (7 in) long. The inflorescences bear cream flowers.

== Distribution and habitat ==
Vatica compressa is endemic to Borneo, where it is confined to Sarawak. Its habitat is kerangas or mixed dipterocarp forest, at elevations to 870 m (2,900 ft).

== Conservation ==
Vatica compressa has been assessed as vulnerable on the IUCN Red List. It is threatened by habitat loss and logging for its timber.
