= Vatica maingayi =

Conservation status
- Vulnerable (IUCN 3.1)

Scientific classification
- Kingdom: Plantae
- Clade: Tracheophytes
- Clade: Angiosperms
- Clade: Eudicots
- Clade: Rosids
- Order: Malvales
- Family: Dipterocarpaceae
- Genus: Vatica
- Species: V. maingayi

Binomial name
- Vatica maingayi Dyer (1874)

Synonyms
- Sunaptea maingayi (Dyer) Ridl. (1922); Vatica aperta Slooten (1942); Vatica macroptera Slooten ex Thorenaar (1926)

Species of tree

Vatica maingayi is a species of flowering plant in the family Dipterocarpaceae. It is a tree native to Borneo, Peninsular Malaysia, Singapore, and Sumatra. It is a Vulnerable species threatened by habitat loss.
