= Vatica cuneata =

Scientific classification
- Kingdom: Plantae
- Clade: Tracheophytes
- Clade: Angiosperms
- Clade: Eudicots
- Clade: Rosids
- Order: Malvales
- Family: Dipterocarpaceae
- Genus: Vatica
- Species: V. cuneata

Binomial name
- Vatica cuneata El-Taguri & Latiff

Species of flowering plant

Vatica cuneata is a species of flowering plant in the family Dipterocarpaceae. It is a tree endemic to Peninsular Malaysia.

The species was described by Houssein M.A. El-Taguri and Abdul Latiff în 2012.
