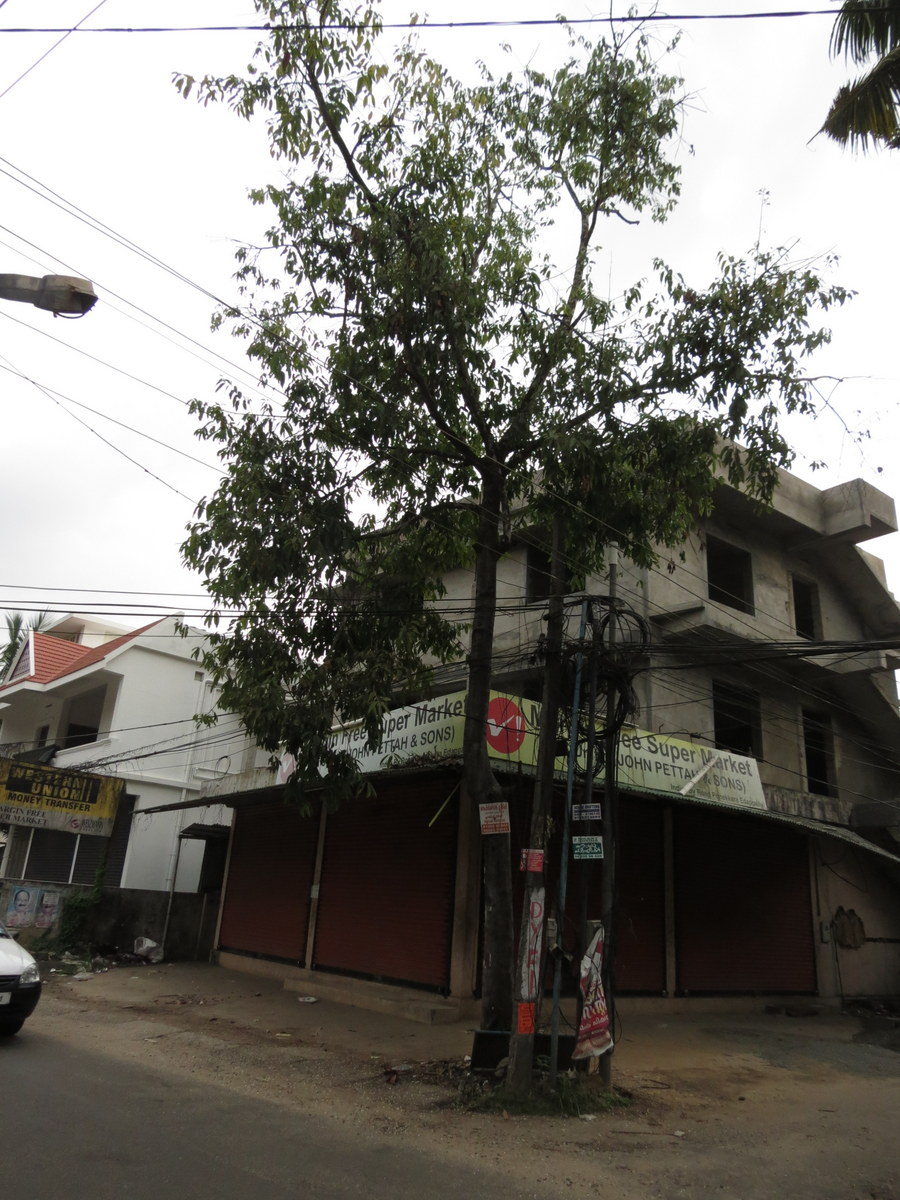
- Vatica chinensis tree in Edappally, Kochi

Conservation status
- Endangered (IUCN 3.1)

Scientific classification
- Kingdom: Plantae
- Clade: Tracheophytes
- Clade: Angiosperms
- Clade: Eudicots
- Clade: Rosids
- Order: Malvales
- Family: Dipterocarpaceae
- Genus: Vatica
- Species: V. chinensis

Binomial name
- Vatica chinensis Linn

= Vatica chinensis =

Species of tree

Vatica chinensis is a species of flowering tree in the family Dipterocarpaceae, found in South Asia.

== Distribution ==
The tree is native to the Western Ghats range in Karnataka and Kerala states of southern India; and historically to Sri Lanka, where it is either extremely rare or possibly extinct. It is an IUCN Red List Critically endangered species.

It is part of the South Western Ghats montane rain forests ecoregion flora.

== Description ==
Vatica chinensis is a tropical evergreen tree, growing to 25 metres (82 ft) in height. Its trunk bole is buttressed, pale green smooth bark. The exudation is resinous.

Leaves are simple, alternate; stipules small, fugacious; petiole 20–50 mm long, stout, glabrous; lamina 9-25 x 3–11 cm, ovate or oblong, base obtuse or broadly cuneate, apex obtusely acute, margin entire, coriaceous, glabrous; lateral nerves 10-14 pairs, parallel, prominent, intercostae scalariform, prominent.

Flowers are bisexual, white, in axillary spreading panicles; pedicels 5-ribbed; ribs alternating with sepals; calyx tube very short, adnate to the base of the ovary; lobes 5, ovoid-deltoid, acute, pubescent; petals 5, white, oblong; stamens 15 in 2 rows; filaments short, flattened at base; anthers oblong, shortly apiculate; ovary superior, covered with large shallow pits, lepidote, 3-celled, ovules 2 in each cell; style about as long as ovary, ribbed; stigmas densely papillose, obscurely 3-lobed.

Fruits are a capsule, lepidote, subglobose shortly pointed with 3 obscure, loculicidal furrows, puberulous; pericarp coriaceous; calyx persistent.

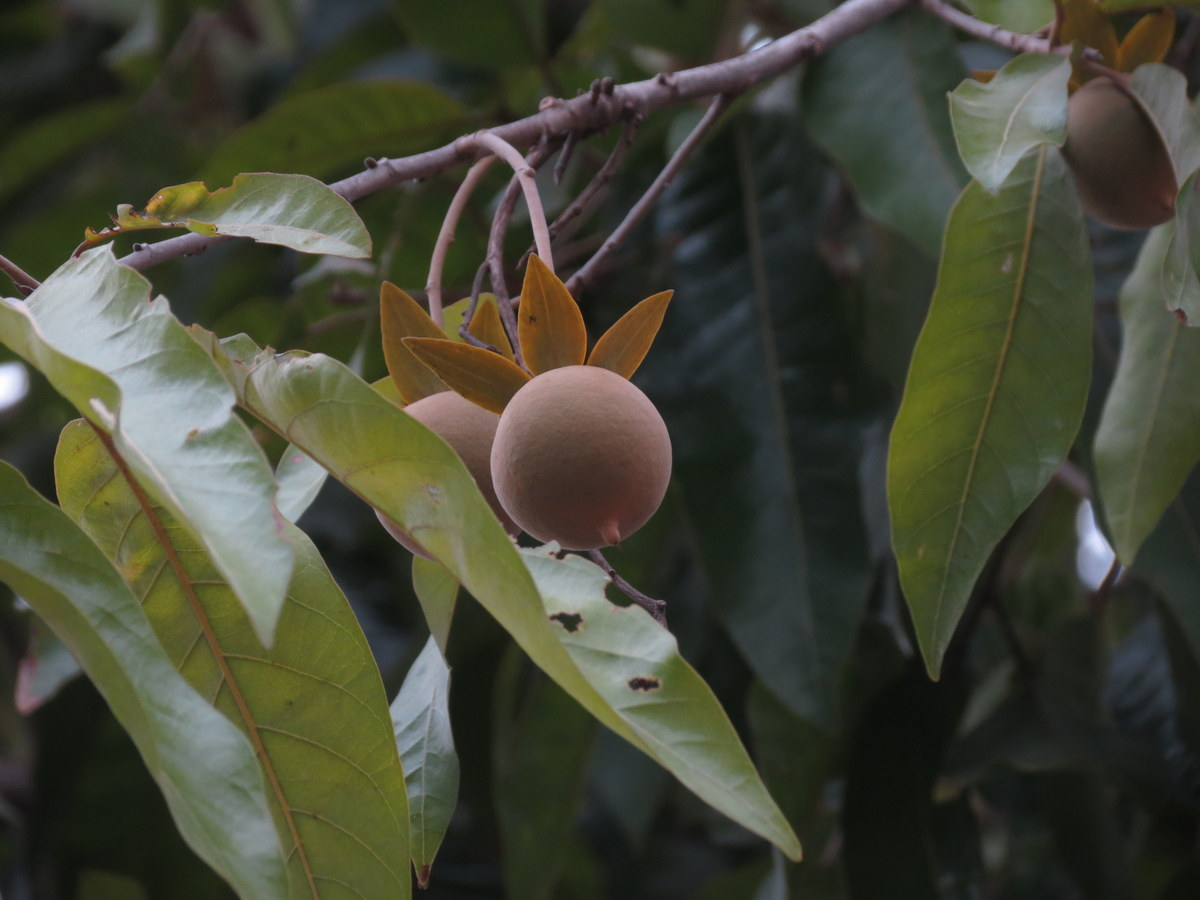
Vatica chinensis fruit

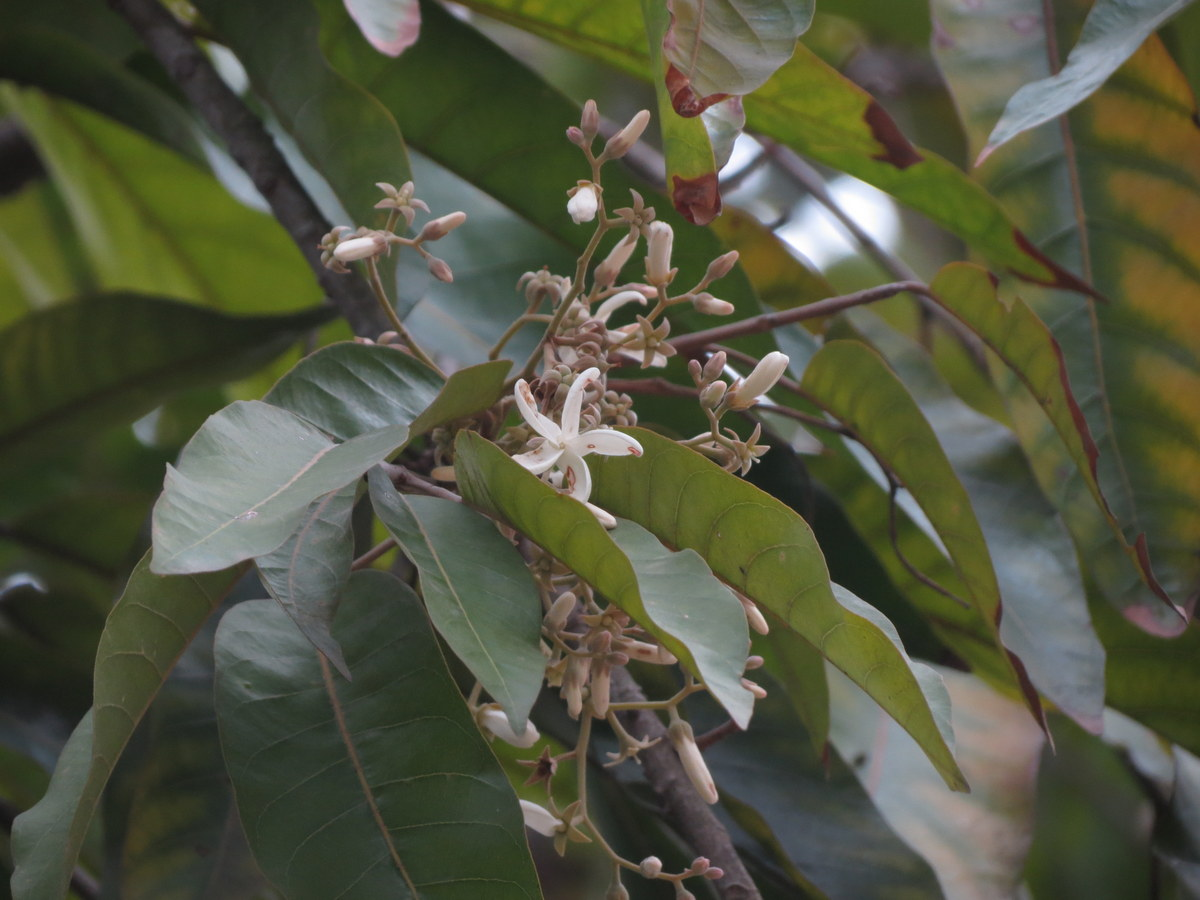
Vatica chinensis flower

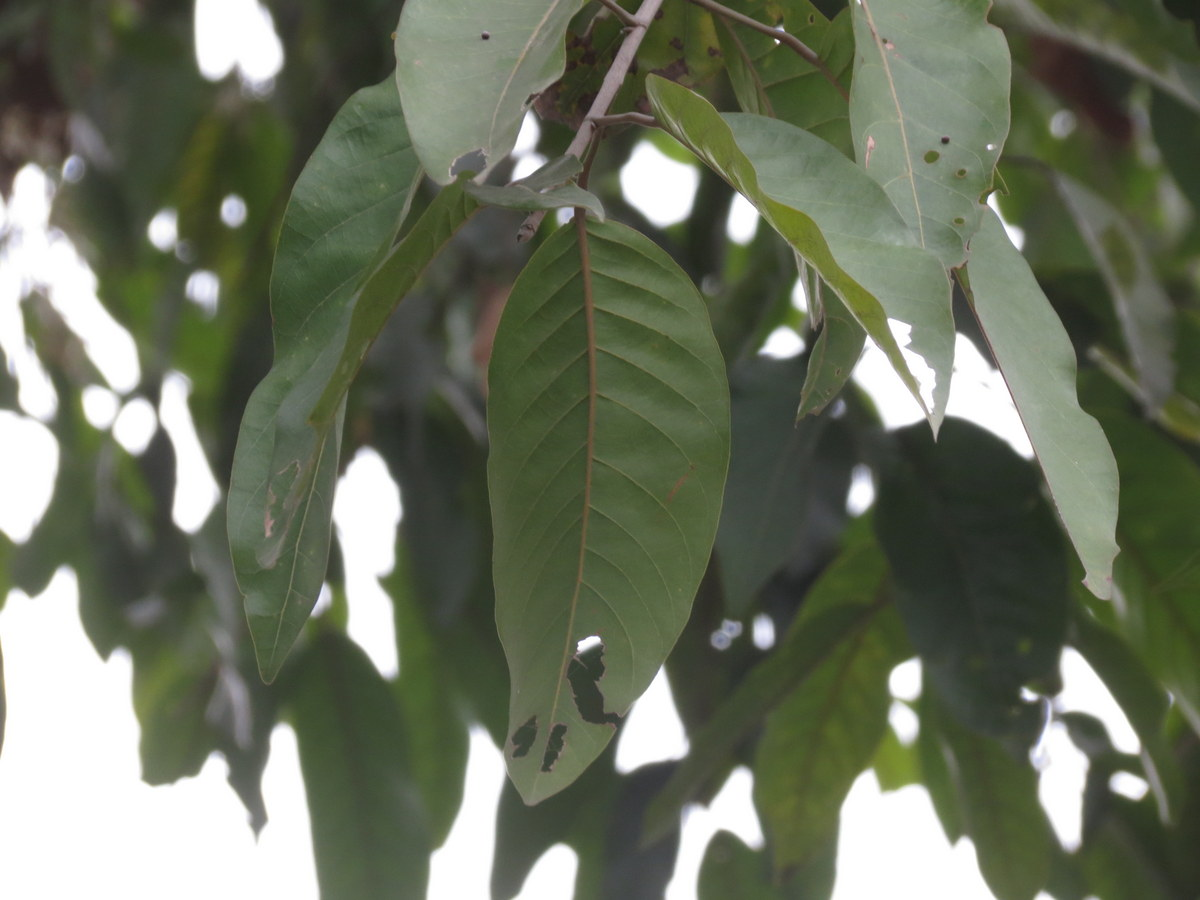
Vatica chinensis leaf
