= Vatica mendozae =

Conservation status
- Critically Endangered (IUCN 3.1)

Scientific classification
- Kingdom: Plantae
- Clade: Embryophytes
- Clade: Tracheophytes
- Clade: Angiosperms
- Clade: Eudicots
- Clade: Rosids
- Order: Malvales
- Family: Dipterocarpaceae
- Genus: Vatica
- Species: V. mendozae

Binomial name
- Vatica mendozae H.G.Gut., Rojo & Madulid

Species of flowering plant

Vatica mendozae is a species of dipterocarp tree endemic to the Philippines. It is a small tree, growing up to 15 metres tall. It is known from a single location in Kinalumbakan, Real, Quezon on the island of Luzon, where it grows in lowland rain forest. It has a small known range and population, and is threatened with habitat loss from illegal logging. The IUCN Red List assesses the species as Critically Endangered.

The species was described Hermes G. Gutiérrez, Justo P. Rojo, Domingo A. Madulid in 2010.
