= Vatica congesta =

Conservation status
- Endangered (IUCN 3.1)

Scientific classification
- Kingdom: Plantae
- Clade: Embryophytes
- Clade: Tracheophytes
- Clade: Spermatophytes
- Clade: Angiosperms
- Clade: Eudicots
- Clade: Rosids
- Order: Malvales
- Family: Dipterocarpaceae
- Genus: Vatica
- Species: V. congesta

Binomial name
- Vatica congesta P.S.Ashton

Synonyms
- Sunaptea congesta (P.S.Ashton) Kosterm.

Species of tree

Vatica congesta is a tree in the family Dipterocarpaceae, native to Borneo. The specific epithet congesta means "congested or combined", referring to the inflorescences.

== Description ==
Vatica congesta grows up to 35 metres (110 ft) tall, with a trunk diameter of up to 35 cm (14 in). Its coriaceous leaves are elliptic to obovate and measure up to 22 cm (9 in) long. The inflorescences bear cream flowers.

== Distribution and habitat ==
Vatica congesta is endemic to Borneo. Its habitat is lowland mixed dipterocarp forest, at elevations to 300 m (1,000 ft).

== Conservation ==
Vatica congesta has been assessed as endangered on the IUCN Red List. It is threatened mainly by land conversion for agriculture and plantations. It is also threatened by logging for its timber.
