= Vatica subglabra =

Conservation status
- Endangered (IUCN 3.1)

Scientific classification
- Kingdom: Plantae
- Clade: Embryophytes
- Clade: Tracheophytes
- Clade: Angiosperms
- Clade: Eudicots
- Clade: Rosids
- Order: Malvales
- Family: Dipterocarpaceae
- Genus: Vatica
- Species: V. subglabra

Binomial name
- Vatica subglabra Merr.

Species of flowering plant

Vatica subglabra is a species of dipterocarp tree endemic to northern Vietnam.

It is native to the provinces of Lai Chau, Son La, Lao Cai, Tuyen Qang, Hanoi, Ninh Binh, Thanh Hoa, and Nghe An, where it grows in lowland evergreen moist forest from 100 to 900 metres elevation, and most abundant from 300 to 600 metres. While it is locally common in protected areas, the overall population is decreasing, and populations are increasingly fragmented by deforestation. The IUCN Red List assesses the species as Endangered.

The species was described by Elmer Drew Merrill in 1942.
