= Vatica heteroptera =

Conservation status
- Near Threatened (IUCN 3.1)

Scientific classification
- Kingdom: Plantae
- Clade: Embryophytes
- Clade: Tracheophytes
- Clade: Angiosperms
- Clade: Eudicots
- Clade: Rosids
- Order: Malvales
- Family: Dipterocarpaceae
- Genus: Vatica
- Species: V. heteroptera

Binomial name
- Vatica heteroptera Symington

Species of tree

Vatica heteroptera is a species of plant in the family Dipterocarpaceae. It is a tree endemic to Peninsular Malaysia. It is native to submontane dipterocarp forests from 900 to 1,200 metres elevation, where it is commonly associated with Shorea platyclados. It has a limited range and is threatened by habitat loss, and the IUCN Red List assesses the species as Near Threatened.

The species was described by Colin Fraser Symington in 1941.
