= Vatica scortechinii =

Conservation status
- Endangered (IUCN 3.1)

Scientific classification
- Kingdom: Plantae
- Clade: Tracheophytes
- Clade: Angiosperms
- Clade: Eudicots
- Clade: Rosids
- Order: Malvales
- Family: Dipterocarpaceae
- Genus: Vatica
- Species: V. scortechinii

Binomial name
- Vatica scortechinii (King) Ridl.

Synonyms
- Retinodendron scortechinii King

Species of tree

Vatica scortechinii is a species of flowering plant in the family Dipterocarpaceae. It is a tree endemic to Peninsular Malaysia. It is an Endangered species threatened by habitat loss.
