= Vatica soepadmoi =

Conservation status
- Critically Endangered (IUCN 2.3)

Scientific classification
- Kingdom: Plantae
- Clade: Tracheophytes
- Clade: Angiosperms
- Clade: Eudicots
- Clade: Rosids
- Order: Malvales
- Family: Dipterocarpaceae
- Genus: Vatica
- Species: V. soepadmoi

Binomial name
- Vatica soepadmoi P.S.Ashton

Species of tree

Vatica soepadmoi is a species of flowering plant in the family Dipterocarpaceae. It is a tree endemic to eastern Sumatra. It is a critically endangered species threatened by habitat loss.

The species was described by Peter Shaw Ashton in 1978.
