= Vatica abdulrahmaniana =

Conservation status
- Endangered (IUCN 3.1)

Scientific classification
- Kingdom: Plantae
- Clade: Tracheophytes
- Clade: Angiosperms
- Clade: Eudicots
- Clade: Rosids
- Order: Malvales
- Family: Dipterocarpaceae
- Genus: Vatica
- Species: V. abdulrahmaniana

Binomial name
- Vatica abdulrahmaniana Chua

Species of flowering plant

Vatica abdulrahmaniana is a species of flowering plant in the family Dipterocarpaceae. It is a tree which grows up to 20 metres tall which is endemic to Peninsular Malaysia. It is known from a single population in Kledang Saiong Forest Reserve, where it grows in lowland rain forest on steep hill slopes and forest margins at about 720 metres elevation. The species' estimated population declined by over 70% over the last three generations due to habitat loss from logging. The area is now protected and the species' population, estimated at 30 trees, is thought to have stabilised. The IUCN Red List assesses the species as endangered.

The species was first described by Lillian Swee-Lian Chua in 2015.
