= Vatica brunigii =

Conservation status
- Near Threatened (IUCN 3.1)

Scientific classification
- Kingdom: Plantae
- Clade: Tracheophytes
- Clade: Angiosperms
- Clade: Eudicots
- Clade: Rosids
- Order: Malvales
- Family: Dipterocarpaceae
- Genus: Vatica
- Species: V. brunigii

Binomial name
- Vatica brunigii P.S.Ashton (1967)

Synonyms
- Sunaptea brunigii (P.S.Ashton) Kosterm.

Species of plant

Vatica brunigii is a species of flowering plant in the family Dipterocarpaceae. It is a tree native to Borneo and eastern Sumatra. In Borneo it is native to western Brunei, Sarawak, and western Kalimantan. It grows up to 30 metres tall. It grows in heath forests and on dry ridges.

It is threatened by habitat loss, and the IUCN Red List assesses the species as near threatened.

The species was described by Peter Shaw Ashton in 1967.

This tree has some medicinal properties.
