= Vatica badiifolia =

Conservation status
- Vulnerable (IUCN 3.1)

Scientific classification
- Kingdom: Plantae
- Clade: Tracheophytes
- Clade: Angiosperms
- Clade: Eudicots
- Clade: Rosids
- Order: Malvales
- Family: Dipterocarpaceae
- Genus: Vatica
- Species: V. badiifolia

Binomial name
- Vatica badiifolia P.S.Ashton

Synonyms
- Sunaptea badiifolia (P.S.Ashton) Kosterm.

Species of tree native to Borneo

Vatica badiifolia is a tree in the family Dipterocarpaceae, native to Borneo. The specific epithet badiifolia means "chestnut brown leaf", referring to the colour of the dry leaf.

== Description ==
Vatica badiifolia grows up to 40 metres (130 ft) tall, with a trunk diameter of up to 50 cm (20 in). Its coriaceous leaves are elliptic and measure up to 15 cm (6 in) long. The inflorescences bear cream flowers.

== Distribution and habitat ==
Vatica badiifolia is endemic to Borneo. Its habitat is mixed dipterocarp forest, at elevations to 700 m (2,300 ft).

== Conservation ==
Vatica badiifolia has been assessed as vulnerable on the IUCN Red List. It is threatened mainly by urban development and expansion of palm oil plantations. It is also threatened by logging for its timber.
