= Vatica hullettii =

Conservation status
- Vulnerable (IUCN 3.1)

Scientific classification
- Kingdom: Plantae
- Clade: Tracheophytes
- Clade: Angiosperms
- Clade: Eudicots
- Clade: Rosids
- Order: Malvales
- Family: Dipterocarpaceae
- Genus: Vatica
- Species: V. hullettii

Binomial name
- Vatica hullettii (Ridl.) P.S.Ashton

Synonyms
- Capura hullettii Ridl.; Otophora hullettii (Ridl.) Ridl.; Vatica stipulata Ridl.

Species of tree

Vatica hullettii is a species of plant in the family Dipterocarpaceae. It is a tree endemic to Peninsular Malaysia. It is a Vulnerable species threatened by habitat loss.

The species was first described as Capura hullettii by Henry Nicholas Ridley in 1910. In 1978 Peter Shaw Ashton placed the species in genus Vatica as V. hullettii.
