= Vatica venulosa =

Conservation status
- Critically Endangered (IUCN 3.1)

Scientific classification
- Kingdom: Plantae
- Clade: Tracheophytes
- Clade: Angiosperms
- Clade: Eudicots
- Clade: Rosids
- Order: Malvales
- Family: Dipterocarpaceae
- Genus: Vatica
- Species: V. venulosa

Binomial name
- Vatica venulosa Blume

Subspecies
- Vatica venulosa subsp. simalurensis (Slooten) P.S.Ashton; Vatica venulosa subsp. venulosa

Synonyms
- Synonyms of subsp. simalurensis: Vatica simalurensis Slooten; Synonyms of subsp. venulosa: Dryobalanops schefferi Hance; Retinodendron bancanum (Scheff.) King; Retinodendron kunstleri King; Vatica bancana Scheff.; Vatica kunstleri (King) Brandis; Vatica lutea Ridl.; Vatica schefferi (Hance) Brandis; Vatica schouteniana Scheff.

Species of tree

Vatica venulosa is a species of flowering plant in the family Dipterocarpaceae. It is a tree native to Borneo, Java, Peninsular Malaysia, and Sumatra. It grows in tropical lowland dipterocarp rain forests, on hills, valleys, and along streams on moist, well-drained, and fertile loamy soils, up to 500 metres elevation.

It is a critically endangered species threatened by habitat loss from logging and conversion of forests to agriculture and plantations.

The species was first described by Carl Ludwig Blume in 1856. Two subspecies are accepted:

- Vatica venulosa subsp. simalurensis (Slooten) P.S.Ashton – western Sumatra
- Vatica venulosa subsp. venulosa – Borneo, Java, Peninsular Malaysia, and Sumatra
