= Vatica lowii =

Conservation status
- Least Concern (IUCN 3.1)

Scientific classification
- Kingdom: Plantae
- Clade: Tracheophytes
- Clade: Angiosperms
- Clade: Eudicots
- Clade: Rosids
- Order: Malvales
- Family: Dipterocarpaceae
- Genus: Vatica
- Species: V. lowii

Binomial name
- Vatica lowii King

Synonyms
- Vatica perakensis King; Sunaptea lowii (King) Ridl.; Sunaptea perakensis (King) Ridl.

Species of tree

Vatica lowii is a species of flowering plant in the family Dipterocarpaceae.

== Distribution ==
Vatica lowii is found in Sumatra and Peninsular Malaysia. It is an endangered species threatened by habitat loss.
