= Vatica flavida =

Conservation status
- Critically Endangered (IUCN 3.1)

Scientific classification
- Kingdom: Plantae
- Clade: Tracheophytes
- Clade: Angiosperms
- Clade: Eudicots
- Clade: Rosids
- Order: Malvales
- Family: Dipterocarpaceae
- Genus: Vatica
- Species: V. flavida

Binomial name
- Vatica flavida Foxw.

Species of tree

Vatica flavida is a species of plant in the family Dipterocarpaceae. It is a tree endemic to Peninsular Malaysia. It is a critically endangered species threatened by habitat loss.
