= Vatica guangxiensis =

Conservation status
- Endangered (IUCN 3.1)

Scientific classification
- Kingdom: Plantae
- Clade: Tracheophytes
- Clade: Angiosperms
- Clade: Eudicots
- Clade: Rosids
- Order: Malvales
- Family: Dipterocarpaceae
- Genus: Vatica
- Species: V. guangxiensis

Binomial name
- Vatica guangxiensis S.L.Mo

Synonyms
- Sunaptea guangxiensis (X.L.Mo) Kosterm.; Vatica guangxiensis subsp. xishuangbannaensis (G.D.Tao & J.H.Zhang) Y.K.Yang & J.K.Wu; Vatica xishuangbannaensis G.D.Tao & J.H.Zhang

Species of tree

Vatica guangxiensis is a species of flowering plant in the family Dipterocarpaceae. It is a tree native to southern China (southern Yunnan and western Guangxi) and northern Vietnam.
