= Vatica umbonata =

Conservation status
- Least Concern (IUCN 3.1)

Scientific classification
- Kingdom: Plantae
- Clade: Tracheophytes
- Clade: Angiosperms
- Clade: Eudicots
- Clade: Rosids
- Order: Malvales
- Family: Dipterocarpaceae
- Genus: Vatica
- Species: V. umbonata

Binomial name
- Vatica umbonata (Hook.f.) Burck

Synonyms
- Pachynocarpus umbonatus Hook.f. (1860) (basionym); Pachynocarpus verrucosus (Burck) F.Heim; Vatica blancoana Elmer; Vatica cupularis Slooten; Vatica verrucosa Burck

Species of tree

Vatica umbonata is a species of flowering plant in the family Dipterocarpaceae. It is a tree native to Borneo, Peninsular Malaysia, the Philippines, Sumatra, and Thailand. It is a large tree, growing up to 30 metres tall. It grows in lowland mixed dipterocarp rain forest, predominantly along rivers, and in hill forest and lower montane dipterocarp forest. It is a gregarious species and can form dense single-species stands.

The species was first described as Pachynocarpus umbonatus by Hook in 1860. In 1887 William Burck placed the species in genus Vatica as V. umbonata.
