= Vatica havilandii =

Conservation status
- Endangered (IUCN 3.1)

Scientific classification
- Kingdom: Plantae
- Clade: Tracheophytes
- Clade: Angiosperms
- Clade: Eudicots
- Clade: Rosids
- Order: Malvales
- Family: Dipterocarpaceae
- Genus: Vatica
- Species: V. havilandii

Binomial name
- Vatica havilandii Brandis

Species of tree

Vatica havilandii is a species of flowering plant in the family Dipterocarpaceae. It is a tree native to Peninsular Malaysia and Borneo. It is a critically endangered species threatened by habitat loss.
