= Vatica pedicellata =

Conservation status
- Vulnerable (IUCN 3.1)

Scientific classification
- Kingdom: Plantae
- Clade: Embryophytes
- Clade: Tracheophytes
- Clade: Spermatophytes
- Clade: Angiosperms
- Clade: Eudicots
- Clade: Rosids
- Order: Malvales
- Family: Dipterocarpaceae
- Genus: Vatica
- Species: V. pedicellata

Binomial name
- Vatica pedicellata Brandis

Species of tree

Vatica pedicellata is a tree in the family Dipterocarpaceae, native to Borneo. The specific epithet pedicellata refers to the prominent flower stalk or pedicel.

== Description ==
Vatica pedicellata grows up to 15 metres (50 ft) tall, with a trunk diameter of up to 15 cm (6 in). Its coriaceous leaves are elliptic to lanceolate and measure up to 23 cm (9 in) long. The inflorescences bear cream flowers.

== Distribution and habitat ==
Vatica pedicellata is endemic to Borneo, where it is confined to Sarawak. Its habitat is lowland mixed dipterocarp, kerangas or swamp forest, at elevations from 100–400 m (300–1,300 ft).

== Conservation ==
Vatica pedicellata has been assessed as vulnerable on the IUCN Red List. It is threatened by development projects and land conversion for plantations.
