= Vatica rotata =

Conservation status
- Endangered (IUCN 3.1)

Scientific classification
- Kingdom: Plantae
- Clade: Embryophytes
- Clade: Tracheophytes
- Clade: Spermatophytes
- Clade: Angiosperms
- Clade: Eudicots
- Clade: Rosids
- Order: Malvales
- Family: Dipterocarpaceae
- Genus: Vatica
- Species: V. rotata

Binomial name
- Vatica rotata P.S.Ashton

Species of tree

Vatica rotata is a tree in the family Dipterocarpaceae, native to Borneo. The specific epithet rotata means "wheel-like", referring to the lobes of the fruit calyx.

== Description ==
Vatica rotata grows as a small tree, with a trunk diameter of about 10 centimetres (4 in). Its coriaceous leaves are elliptic to ovate and measure up to 10 cm (4 in) long. The inflorescences bear cream flowers.

== Distribution and habitat ==
Vatica rotata is endemic to Borneo. Its habitat is lowland heath forests and mixed dipterocarp forests, at elevations to 200 m (700 ft).

== Conservation ==
Vatica rotata has been assessed as endangered on the IUCN Red List. It is threatened mainly by agricultural encroachment on the species' habitat.
