= Vatica griffithii =

Conservation status
- Data Deficient (IUCN 3.1)

Scientific classification
- Kingdom: Plantae
- Clade: Tracheophytes
- Clade: Angiosperms
- Clade: Eudicots
- Clade: Rosids
- Order: Malvales
- Family: Dipterocarpaceae
- Genus: Vatica
- Species: V. griffithii

Binomial name
- Vatica griffithii Brandis

Species of flowering plant

Vatica griffithii is a species of flowering plant in the family Dipterocarpaceae. It is a tree endemic to Myanmar.

The species was first described by Dietrich Brandis in 1895. It was collected in Kachin and Tanintharyi over a century ago, and has not been collected since. Nothing is known of its habitat, ecology, or current population.
