= Vatica kanthanensis =

Conservation status
- Critically Endangered (IUCN 3.1)

Scientific classification
- Kingdom: Plantae
- Clade: Embryophytes
- Clade: Tracheophytes
- Clade: Angiosperms
- Clade: Eudicots
- Clade: Rosids
- Order: Malvales
- Family: Dipterocarpaceae
- Genus: Vatica
- Species: V. kanthanensis

Binomial name
- Vatica kanthanensis Saw

Species of flowering plant

Vatica kanthanensis is a species of dipterocarp tree endemic to Peninsular Malaysia. It is a medium-sized tree which can grow from 15 to 20 metres tall, with a smooth-barked unbuttressed trunk 30–35 cm in diameter. It is known from a single location, Gunung Kanthan, a limestone karst tower in Perak state. It is an emergent canopy tree in lowland rain forest on limestone-derived soils, typically where soil accumulates in gullies. A 2014 survey found fewer than 50 mature trees on the hill. The hill is not protected and is still being quarried for limestone. The mining company Lafarge Malaysia agreed to set aside about 60% of the hill as a preserve. The IUCN Red List assesses the species as Critically Endangered.

The species was described by Leng Guan Saw in 2014.
