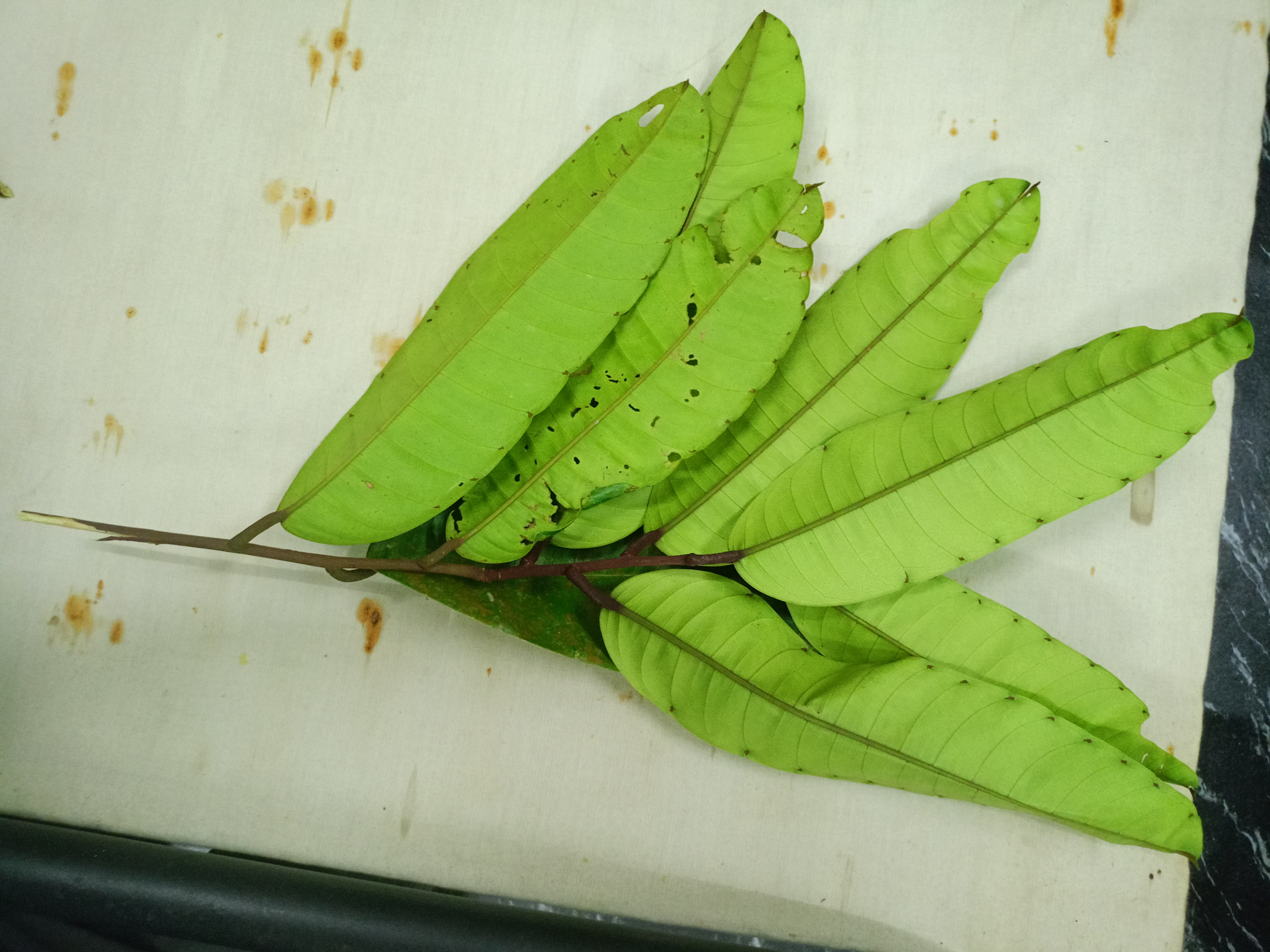

Conservation status
- Endangered (IUCN 3.1)

Scientific classification
- Kingdom: Plantae
- Clade: Embryophytes
- Clade: Tracheophytes
- Clade: Angiosperms
- Clade: Eudicots
- Clade: Rosids
- Order: Malvales
- Family: Dipterocarpaceae
- Genus: Vatica
- Species: V. mizaniana

Binomial name
- Vatica mizaniana Chua

= Vatica mizaniana =

Species of plant

Vatica mizaniana is a species of flowering plant in the family Dipterocarpaceae. It was first described by Lillian Swee-Lian Chua in 2015.

== Distribution ==
Vatica mizaniana is endemic to the state of Terengganu in Peninsular Malaysia, where it is known only from the Tembat Forest Reserve in Hulu Terengganu.

The species occurs in lowland tropical rainforest within the Tembat forest complex, part of the larger Central Forest Spine landscape of Peninsular Malaysia.

== Taxonomy ==
The species was described in 2015 together with Vatica abdulrahmaniana. It is distinguished from the related Bornean species Vatica pedicellata by differences in its leaves and fruits.

== Conservation ==
As a narrowly distributed tree endemic to Peninsular Malaysia, Vatica mizaniana may be vulnerable to habitat loss caused by forest degradation and land-use change. Further studies are needed to determine its population size and conservation status.
