= Vatica parvifolia =

Conservation status
- Vulnerable (IUCN 3.1)

Scientific classification
- Kingdom: Plantae
- Clade: Embryophytes
- Clade: Tracheophytes
- Clade: Spermatophytes
- Clade: Angiosperms
- Clade: Eudicots
- Clade: Rosids
- Order: Malvales
- Family: Dipterocarpaceae
- Genus: Vatica
- Species: V. parvifolia

Binomial name
- Vatica parvifolia P.S.Ashton

Synonyms
- Sunaptea parvifolia (P.S.Ashton) Kosterm.

Species of tree

Vatica parvifolia is a tree in the family Dipterocarpaceae, native to Borneo. The specific epithet parvifolia means "small leaf".

== Description ==
Vatica parvifolia grows up to 35 metres (110 ft) tall, with a trunk diameter of up to 35 cm (14 in). Its coriaceous leaves are lanceolate to ovate and measure up to 6 cm (2 in) long. The inflorescences bear cream flowers.

== Distribution and habitat ==
Vatica parvifolia is endemic to Borneo. Its habitat is kerangas forest, at elevations to 300 m (1,000 ft).

== Conservation ==
Vatica parvifolia has been assessed as vulnerable on the IUCN Red List. It is mainly threatened by logging for its timber. In Kalimantan, it is also threatened by land conversion for tree plantations and urban settlement.
