= Vatica oblongifolia =

Conservation status
- Least Concern (IUCN 3.1)

Scientific classification
- Kingdom: Plantae
- Clade: Embryophytes
- Clade: Tracheophytes
- Clade: Spermatophytes
- Clade: Angiosperms
- Clade: Eudicots
- Clade: Rosids
- Order: Malvales
- Family: Dipterocarpaceae
- Genus: Vatica
- Species: V. oblongifolia

Binomial name
- Vatica oblongifolia Hook.f.

Synonyms
- Vatica furfuracea Burck

Species of tree

Vatica oblongifolia is a tree in the family Dipterocarpaceae, native to Borneo. The specific epithet oblongifolia means 'rather long leaf'.

== Description ==
Vatica oblongifolia grows up to 35 metres (110 ft) tall, with a trunk diameter of up to 50 cm (20 in). Its coriaceous leaves measure up to 31 cm (12 in) long. The inflorescences bear cream-coloured flowers. The nuts are roundish and measure about 2 cm (1 in) wide. The timber is used in furniture and construction.

== Distribution and habitat ==
Vatica oblongifolia is endemic to Borneo. Its habitat is in mixed dipterocarp forest, at elevations to 1,000 m (3,300 ft).
