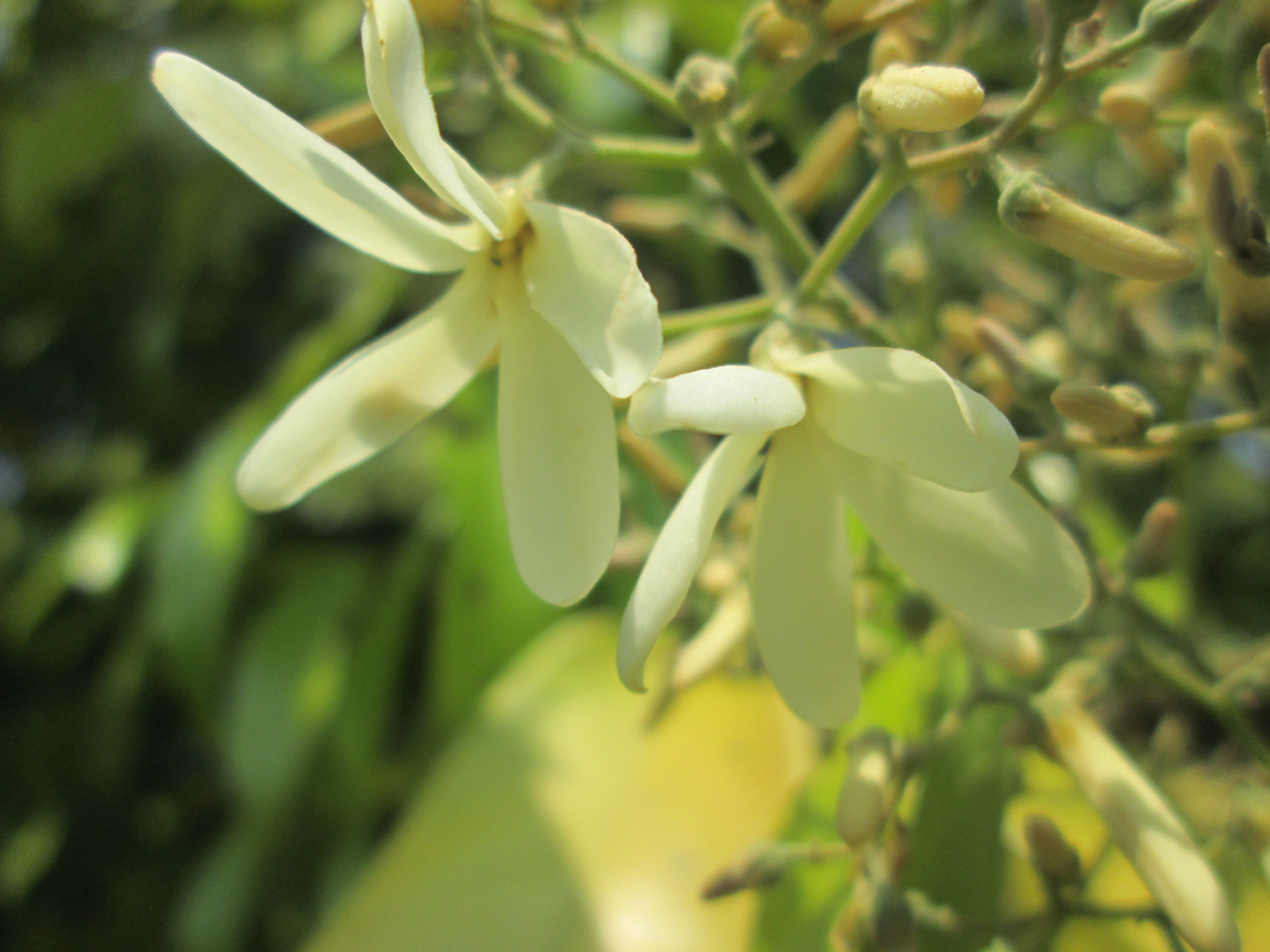
- In Kuningan Botanical Garden

Conservation status
- Vulnerable (IUCN 3.1)

Scientific classification
- Kingdom: Plantae
- Clade: Tracheophytes
- Clade: Angiosperms
- Clade: Eudicots
- Clade: Rosids
- Order: Malvales
- Family: Dipterocarpaceae
- Genus: Vatica
- Species: V. pauciflora

Binomial name
- Vatica pauciflora (Korth.) Blume

Synonyms
- Elaeogene sumatrana Miq.; Pachynocarpus ruminatus (Burck) Brandis; Pachynocarpus wallichii (Dyer) King; Retinodendron pauciflorum Korth. (1840); Vatica forbesiana Burck; Vatica kelsallii Ridl.; Vatica lamponga Burck; Vatica obtusa Burck; Vatica ovalifolia Ridl.; Vateria pauciflora (Korth.) Walp.; Vatica ruminata Burck; Vatica sumatrana (Miq.) Slooten; Vatica wallichii Dyer; Vatica zollingeriana A.DC.

= Vatica pauciflora =

Species of tree

Vatica pauciflora is a species of tree in the family Dipterocarpaceae. It is native to Peninsular Malaysia, Sumatra, Thailand and Vietnam.

The species was first described as Retinodendron pauciflorum by Pieter Willem Korthals in 1840. The specific epithet pauciflora is Latin for 'few-flowered'. In 1856 Carl Ludwig Blume placed the species in genus Vatica as V. pauciflora.

== Distribution ==
Vatica pauciflora is native to Sumatra (including Bangka Island), Peninsular Malaysia, Singapore and Thailand. Plants of the World Online says it is native to Vietnam, while the IUCN Red List says its presence there is uncertain. It is common in freshwater swamp forests and in lowland mixed dipterocarp rain forest along river banks and swamp edges.

== Threats ==
Vatica pauciflora is threatened by residential development and agricultural plantations. Also, the species is being logged for its timber. The IUCN Red List assesses the species as Vulnerable.
