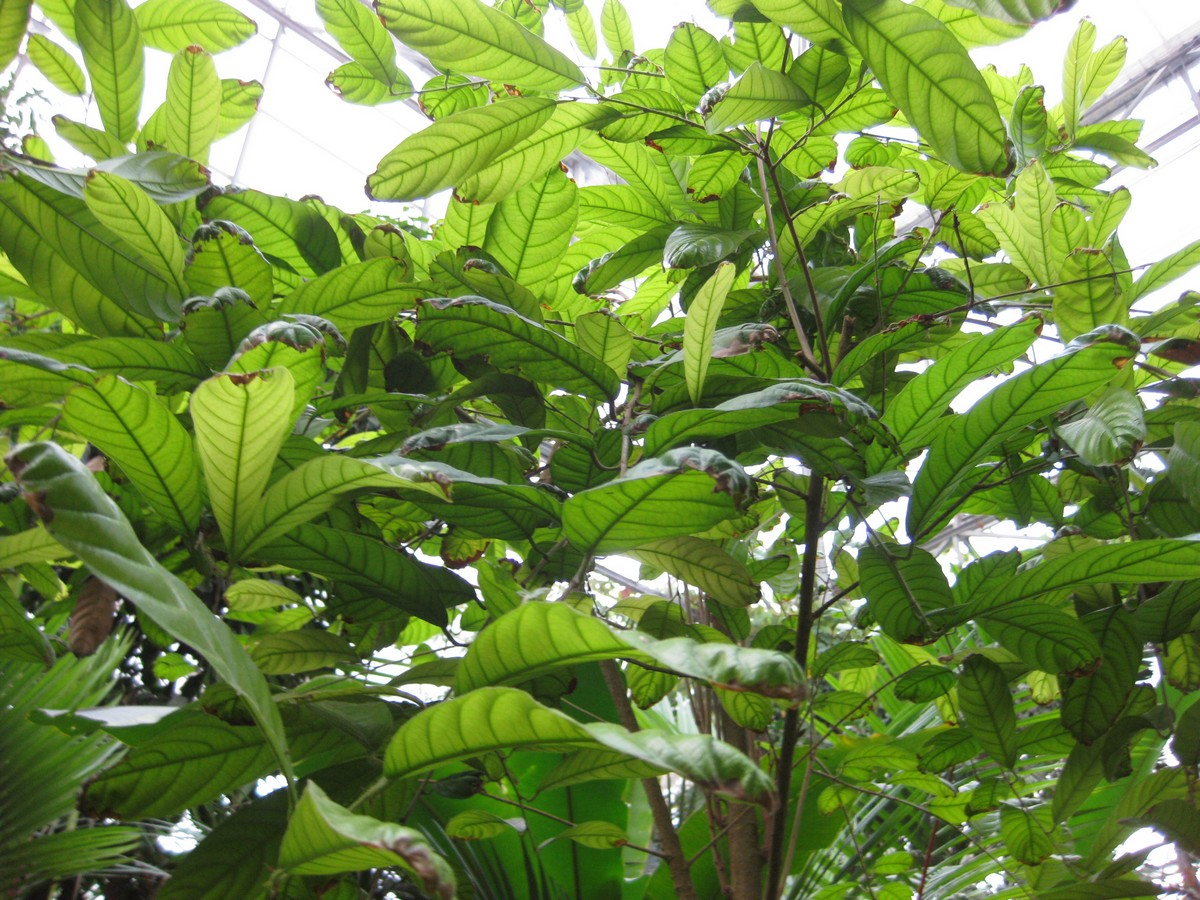

Conservation status
- Endangered (IUCN 3.1)

Scientific classification
- Kingdom: Plantae
- Clade: Tracheophytes
- Clade: Angiosperms
- Clade: Eudicots
- Clade: Rosids
- Order: Malvales
- Family: Dipterocarpaceae
- Genus: Vatica
- Species: V. diospyroides

Binomial name
- Vatica diospyroides Symington

= Vatica diospyroides =

Species of tree

Vatica diospyroides is a species of plant in the family Dipterocarpaceae. It is a tree found in Malaysia, Thailand, and Vietnam. It is a critically endangered species threatened by habitat loss.
