= Vatica vinosa =

Conservation status
- Near Threatened (IUCN 3.1)

Scientific classification
- Kingdom: Plantae
- Clade: Embryophytes
- Clade: Tracheophytes
- Clade: Spermatophytes
- Clade: Angiosperms
- Clade: Eudicots
- Clade: Rosids
- Order: Malvales
- Family: Dipterocarpaceae
- Genus: Vatica
- Species: V. vinosa

Binomial name
- Vatica vinosa P.S.Ashton

Species of tree

Vatica vinosa is a tree in the family Dipterocarpaceae, native to Borneo. The specific epithet vinosa means 'grape-coloured', referring to the hairs covering various parts of the plant.

== Description ==
Vatica vinosa grows up to 30 metres (100 ft) tall, with a trunk diameter of up to 40 cm (16 in). Its coriaceous leaves are blue-green with purple veins, are shaped elliptic to lanceolate and measure up to 15 cm (6 in) long. The inflorescences bear cream flowers.

== Distribution and habitat ==
Vatica vinosa is endemic to Borneo. Its habitat is mixed dipterocarp forest, at elevations to 300 m (1,000 ft).

== Conservation ==
Vatica vinosa has been assessed as near threatened on the IUCN Red List. It is threatened mainly by conversion of land for agriculture and plantations. It is also threatened by logging for its timber.
