= Vatica cuspidata =

Conservation status
- Near Threatened (IUCN 3.1)

Scientific classification
- Kingdom: Plantae
- Clade: Tracheophytes
- Clade: Angiosperms
- Clade: Eudicots
- Clade: Rosids
- Order: Malvales
- Family: Dipterocarpaceae
- Genus: Vatica
- Species: V. cuspidata

Binomial name
- Vatica cuspidata (Ridl.) Desch

Synonyms
- Sunaptea cuspidata Ridl.

Species of tree

Vatica cuspidata is a species of flowering plant in the family Dipterocarpaceae. It is a tree endemic to Peninsular Malaysia. It grows in lowland rain forest, on coastal hills around 150 metres elevation and inland ridges from 300 to 800 metres elevation. It is threatened by habitat loss, and the IUCN Red List assesses the species as Near Threatened.

The species was first described as Sunaptea cuspidata by Henry Nicholas Ridley in 1920. In 1934 H. E. Desch placed the species in genus Vatica as V. cuspidata.
