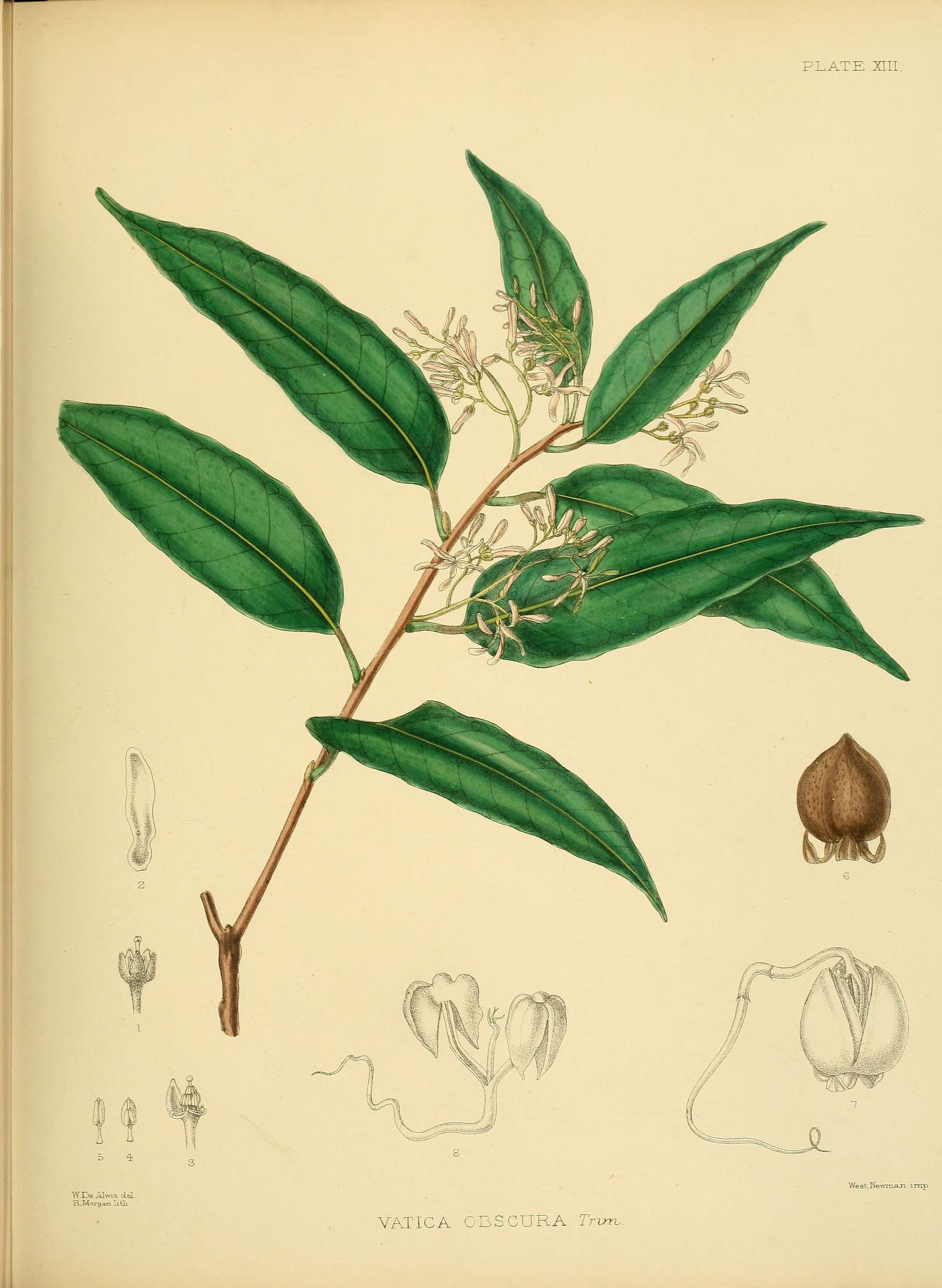

Conservation status
- Vulnerable (IUCN 3.1)

Scientific classification
- Kingdom: Plantae
- Clade: Tracheophytes
- Clade: Angiosperms
- Clade: Eudicots
- Clade: Rosids
- Order: Malvales
- Family: Dipterocarpaceae
- Genus: Vatica
- Species: V. obscura

Binomial name
- Vatica obscura Trimen

= Vatica obscura =

Species of tree

Vatica obscura is a species of plant in the family Dipterocarpaceae. It is a tree endemic to Sri Lanka. It is a Vulnerable species threatened by habitat loss.
