= Vatica ridleyana =

Conservation status
- Data Deficient (IUCN 3.1)

Scientific classification
- Kingdom: Plantae
- Clade: Tracheophytes
- Clade: Angiosperms
- Clade: Eudicots
- Clade: Rosids
- Order: Malvales
- Family: Dipterocarpaceae
- Genus: Vatica
- Species: V. ridleyana

Binomial name
- Vatica ridleyana Brandis

Synonyms
- Pachynocarpus ridleyanus (Brandis) J.W.Anderson

Species of tree

Vatica ridleyana is a species of flowering plant in the family Dipterocarpaceae. It is a tree found in Sumatra and Singapore. Little is known about the species' population or habitat, and the IUCN Red List assesses the species as Data Deficient.

The species was first described by Dietrich Brandis in 1895.
