= Vatica cauliflora =

Conservation status
- Critically Endangered (IUCN 3.1)

Scientific classification
- Kingdom: Plantae
- Clade: Tracheophytes
- Clade: Angiosperms
- Clade: Eudicots
- Clade: Rosids
- Order: Malvales
- Family: Dipterocarpaceae
- Genus: Vatica
- Species: V. cauliflora

Binomial name
- Vatica cauliflora P.S.Ashton

Species of tree

Vatica cauliflora is a species of plant in the family Dipterocarpaceae. It is a tree endemic to Kalimantan on Borneo. It grows in lowland rain forest near rivers. It has a limited range and is threatened by habitat loss, with a declining population. The IUCN Red List assesses the species as Critically Endangered.

The species was described by Peter Shaw Ashton in 1978.
