= Vatica affinis =

Conservation status
- Endangered (IUCN 3.1)

Scientific classification
- Kingdom: Plantae
- Clade: Tracheophytes
- Clade: Angiosperms
- Clade: Eudicots
- Clade: Rosids
- Order: Malvales
- Family: Dipterocarpaceae
- Genus: Vatica
- Species: V. affinis

Binomial name
- Vatica affinis Thwaites

Species of tree native to Sri Lanka

Vatica affinis is a species of flowering plant in the family Dipterocarpaceae. It is a tree endemic to southwestern Sri Lanka. It is an endangered species threatened by habitat loss.
