= Vatica philastreana =

Conservation status
- Endangered (IUCN 3.1)

Scientific classification
- Kingdom: Plantae
- Clade: Tracheophytes
- Clade: Angiosperms
- Clade: Eudicots
- Clade: Rosids
- Order: Malvales
- Family: Dipterocarpaceae
- Genus: Vatica
- Species: V. philastreana

Binomial name
- Vatica philastreana Pierre

Synonyms
- Diospyros addita H.R. Fletcher; Vatica thorelii Pierre

Species of tree

Vatica philastreana is a species of plant in the family Dipterocarpaceae. It is a tree native to Cambodia, Laos, Thailand, and Vietnam.
