= Vatica glabrata =

Conservation status
- Vulnerable (IUCN 3.1)

Scientific classification
- Kingdom: Plantae
- Clade: Embryophytes
- Clade: Tracheophytes
- Clade: Spermatophytes
- Clade: Angiosperms
- Clade: Eudicots
- Clade: Rosids
- Order: Malvales
- Family: Dipterocarpaceae
- Genus: Vatica
- Species: V. glabrata

Binomial name
- Vatica glabrata P.S.Ashton

Species of tree

Vatica glabrata is a tree in the family Dipterocarpaceae which is endemic to Borneo.

The species was described by Peter Shaw Ashton in 1982. The specific epithet means 'smooth-skinned'.

== Description ==
Vatica glabrata grows up to 20 metres (70 ft) tall, with a trunk diameter of up to 60 cm (24 in). Its coriaceous leaves measure up to 15 cm (6 in) long. The inflorescences bear cream-coloured flowers.

== Distribution and habitat ==
Vatica glabrata is endemic to Borneo. Its habitat is upper dipterocarp forest at elevations of 1,200–1,500 m (4,000–5,000 ft).

== Conservation ==
Vatica glabrata has been assessed as vulnerable on the IUCN Red List. It is threatened by logging for its timber.
