= Vatica najibiana =

Conservation status
- Endangered (IUCN 3.1)

Scientific classification
- Kingdom: Plantae
- Clade: Embryophytes
- Clade: Tracheophytes
- Clade: Angiosperms
- Clade: Eudicots
- Clade: Rosids
- Order: Malvales
- Family: Dipterocarpaceae
- Genus: Vatica
- Species: V. najibiana

Binomial name
- Vatica najibiana Ummul-Nazrah

Species of flowering plant

Vatica najibiana is a species of dipterocarp tree. It is endemic to Peninsular Malaysia, where it is known only from the summit of two karst limestone hills in Relai Forest Reserve in Kelantan and Gua Tanggang in Pahang. It grows 7 to 8 metres tall in lowland tropical rain forest, taking root in limestone rock fissures with thick leaf litter.

The Kelantan population is threatened by ongoing logging and expanding oil palm plantations, which if they continue unchecked will threaten that population with extinction. The IUCN Red List assesses the species as Endangered.

The species was described by Abdul Rahman Ummul Nazrah in 2018.
