= Vatica dulitensis =

Conservation status
- Near Threatened (IUCN 3.1)

Scientific classification
- Kingdom: Plantae
- Clade: Embryophytes
- Clade: Tracheophytes
- Clade: Spermatophytes
- Clade: Angiosperms
- Clade: Eudicots
- Clade: Rosids
- Order: Malvales
- Family: Dipterocarpaceae
- Genus: Vatica
- Species: V. dulitensis

Binomial name
- Vatica dulitensis Symington

Species of tree

Vatica dulitensis is a tree in the family Dipterocarpaceae, native to Borneo. It is named for Mount Dulit in Sarawak.

== Description ==
Vatica dulitensis grows up to 30 metres (100 ft) tall, with a trunk diameter of up to 50 cm (20 in). Its obovate to lanceolate leaves measure up to 11 cm (4 in) long. The inflorescences bear cream flowers.

== Distribution and habitat ==
Vatica dulitensis is endemic to Borneo. Its habitat is mainly in upper dipterocarp forest at elevations of 600–1,350 m (2,000–4,400 ft). It is sometimes found in lowland mixed dipterocarp forest.

== Conservation ==
Vatica dulitensis has been assessed as near threatened on the IUCN Red List. It is threatened by the conversion of land for agriculture and by the construction of logging roads. The timber is used for flooring and furniture. The species is found in protected areas, especially in Sarawak and Sabah.
