= Vatica rynchocarpa =

Conservation status
- Endangered (IUCN 3.1)

Scientific classification
- Kingdom: Plantae
- Clade: Embryophytes
- Clade: Tracheophytes
- Clade: Spermatophytes
- Clade: Angiosperms
- Clade: Eudicots
- Clade: Rosids
- Order: Malvales
- Family: Dipterocarpaceae
- Genus: Vatica
- Species: V. rynchocarpa

Binomial name
- Vatica rynchocarpa P.S.Ashton

Synonyms
- Sunaptea rynchocarpa (P.S.Ashton) Kosterm.

Species of tree

Vatica rynchocarpa is a tree in the family Dipterocarpaceae, native to Borneo. The specific epithet rynchocarpa means "snout fruit", referring to the beak-like shape of the nut.

== Description ==
Vatica rynchocarpa grows up to 30 metres (100 ft) tall, with a trunk diameter of up to 100 cm (40 in). Its coriaceous leaves are elliptic to lanceolate and measure up to 8.5 cm (3 in) long. The ovoid nuts, tapering to a sharp end, measure up to 1.8 cm (0.7 in) long.

== Distribution and habitat ==
Vatica rynchocarpa is endemic to Borneo. Its habitat is lowland mixed dipterocarp forests, at elevations to 200 m (700 ft).

== Conservation ==
Vatica rynchocarpa has been assessed as endangered on the IUCN Red List. It is threatened mainly by conversion of land for plantations and urban expansion. Logging for its timber also threatens the species.
