= Vatica coriacea =

Conservation status
- Near Threatened (IUCN 3.1)

Scientific classification
- Kingdom: Plantae
- Clade: Embryophytes
- Clade: Tracheophytes
- Clade: Spermatophytes
- Clade: Angiosperms
- Clade: Eudicots
- Clade: Rosids
- Order: Malvales
- Family: Dipterocarpaceae
- Genus: Vatica
- Species: V. coriacea

Binomial name
- Vatica coriacea P.S.Ashton

Synonyms
- Sunaptea coriacea (P.S.Ashton) Kosterm.

Species of tree

Vatica coriacea is a tree in the family Dipterocarpaceae, native to Borneo. The specific epithet coriacea means "leathery", referring to the leaves.

== Description ==
Vatica coriacea grows up to 20 metres (70 ft) tall, with a trunk diameter of up to 50 cm (20 in). Its coriaceous leaves are obovate and measure up to 15 cm (6 in) long. The inflorescences bear cream flowers.

== Distribution and habitat ==
Vatica coriacea is endemic to Borneo. Its habitat is kerangas forest.

== Conservation ==
Vatica coriacea has been assessed as near threatened on the IUCN Red List. It is threatened by land conversion for agriculture, logging for its timber and by forest fires and climate change.
