= Vatica sarawakensis =

Conservation status
- Vulnerable (IUCN 3.1)

Scientific classification
- Kingdom: Plantae
- Clade: Embryophytes
- Clade: Tracheophytes
- Clade: Spermatophytes
- Clade: Angiosperms
- Clade: Eudicots
- Clade: Rosids
- Order: Malvales
- Family: Dipterocarpaceae
- Genus: Vatica
- Species: V. sarawakensis

Binomial name
- Vatica sarawakensis F.Heim

Synonyms
- Retinodendropsis aspera F.Heim; Vatica ramiflora Slooten

Species of tree

Vatica sarawakensis is a tree in the family Dipterocarpaceae. It is named for Sarawak, part of the species' range in Borneo.

== Description ==
Vatica sarawakensis grows up to 25 metres (80 ft) tall, with a trunk diameter of up to 60 cm (24 in). Its coriaceous leaves are oblong to obovate and measure up to 35 cm (14 in) long. The inflorescences bear cream flowers.

== Distribution and habitat ==
Vatica sarawakensis is endemic to Borneo. Its habitat is mixed dipterocarp forests, to elevations of 1,400 m (5,000 ft).

== Conservation ==
Vatica sarawakensis has been assessed as vulnerable on the IUCN Red List. It is threatened mainly by logging for its timber. Land conversion for plantations, including for palm oil, also threatens the species.
