= Vatica spatulata =

Scientific classification
- Kingdom: Plantae
- Clade: Embryophytes
- Clade: Tracheophytes
- Clade: Angiosperms
- Clade: Eudicots
- Clade: Rosids
- Order: Malvales
- Family: Dipterocarpaceae
- Genus: Vatica
- Species: V. spatulata

Binomial name
- Vatica spatulata El-Taguri & Latiff

Species of flowering plant

Vatica spatulata is a species of dipterocarp tree endemic to Peninsular Malaysia.

The species was described by Houssein M.A. El-Taguri and Abdul Latiff in 2012.
