= Vatica palungensis =

Conservation status
- Data Deficient (IUCN 3.1)

Scientific classification
- Kingdom: Plantae
- Clade: Embryophytes
- Clade: Tracheophytes
- Clade: Spermatophytes
- Clade: Angiosperms
- Clade: Eudicots
- Clade: Rosids
- Order: Malvales
- Family: Dipterocarpaceae
- Genus: Vatica
- Species: V. palungensis

Binomial name
- Vatica palungensis P.S.Ashton

Species of tree

Vatica palungensis is a tree in the family Dipterocarpaceae. It is endemic to Borneo, where it is known only from West Kalimantan, Indonesia.

Vatica palungensis is recorded from a single area in Cabang Panti Research Site of Gunung Palung National Park in West Kalimantan, between 665 and 1,000 metres (2,180 and 3,280 ft) elevation.

It grows in dense, stunted kerangas forests on infertile steep sandstone slopes with exposed granite rocks.
