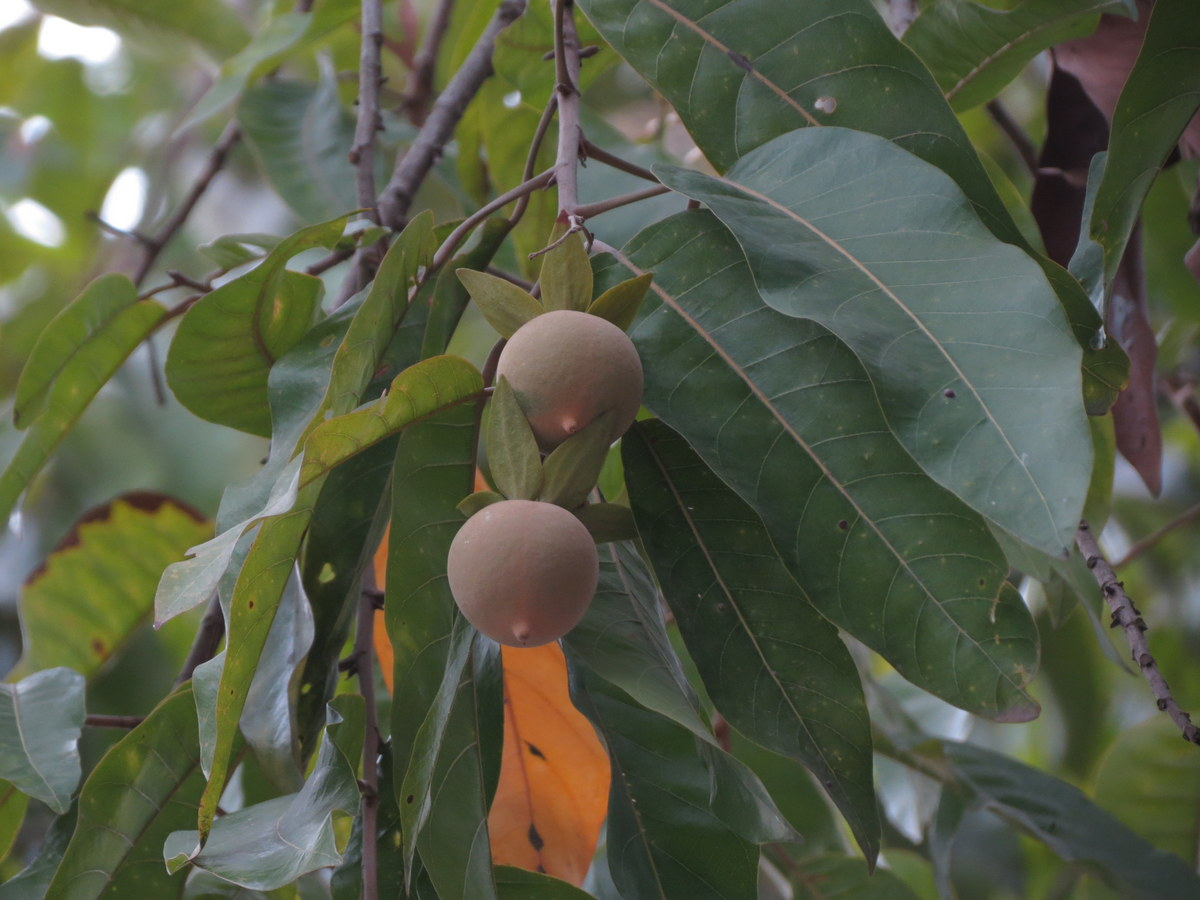
- Vatica chinensis

Scientific classification
- Kingdom: Plantae
- Clade: Tracheophytes
- Clade: Angiosperms
- Clade: Eudicots
- Clade: Rosids
- Order: Malvales
- Family: Dipterocarpaceae
- Subfamily: Dipterocarpoideae
- Genus: Vatica; L. (1771)

Synonyms
- Brachypodandra Gagnep.; Elaeogene Miq.; Isauxis (Arn.) Rchb.; Pachynocarpus Hook.f.; Perissandra Gagnep.; Pteranthera Blume; Retinodendron Korth.; Retinodendropsis F.Heim; Seidlia Kostel.; Sunaptea Griff.; Synaptea Kurz

= Vatica =

Genus of tropical trees

Vatica is a genus of plants in the family Dipterocarpaceae. Its species range from India and southern China through Sri Lanka, Indochina, Indonesia, the Philippines, and New Guinea.

== Species ==
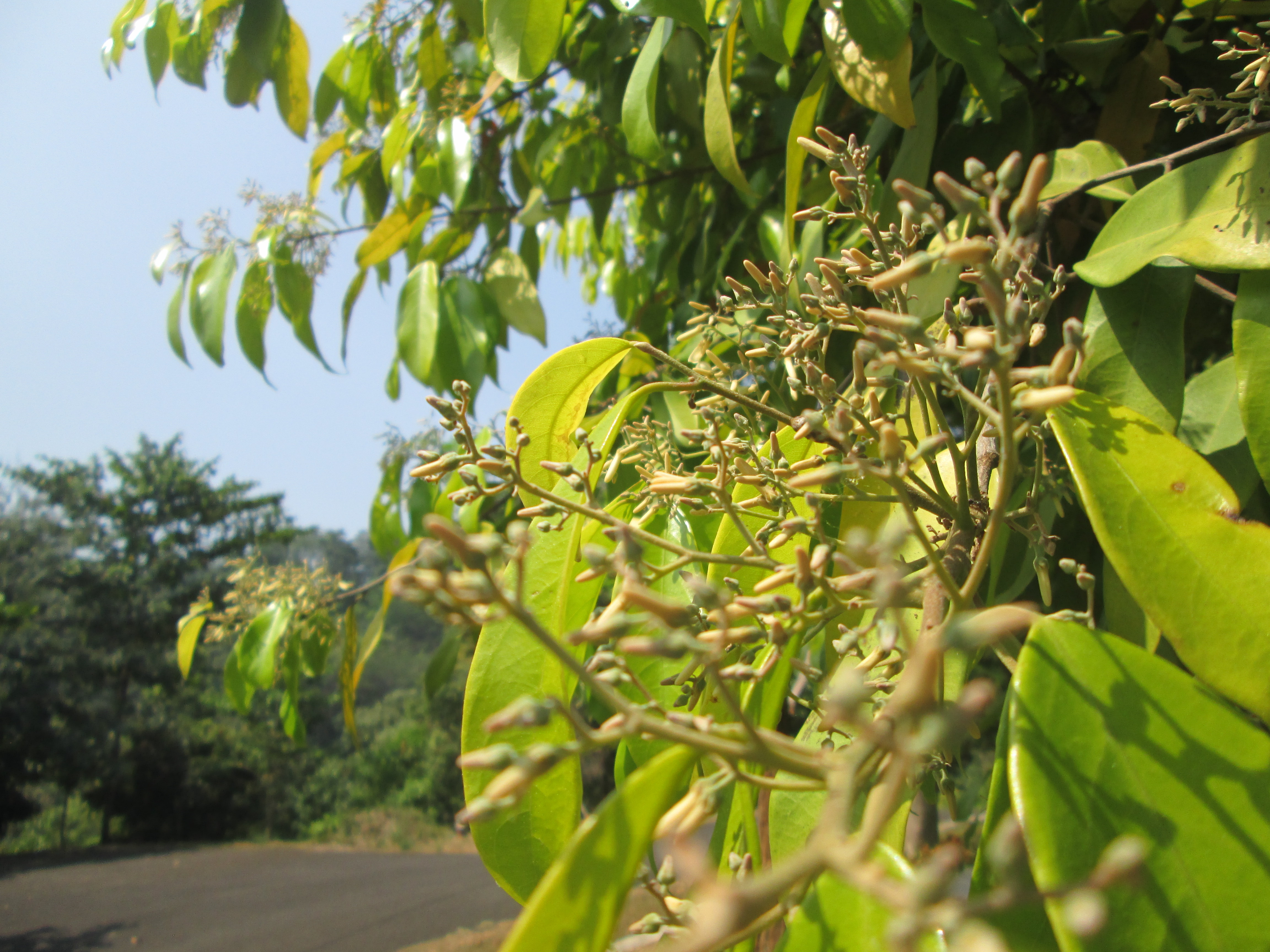
Vatica pauciflora

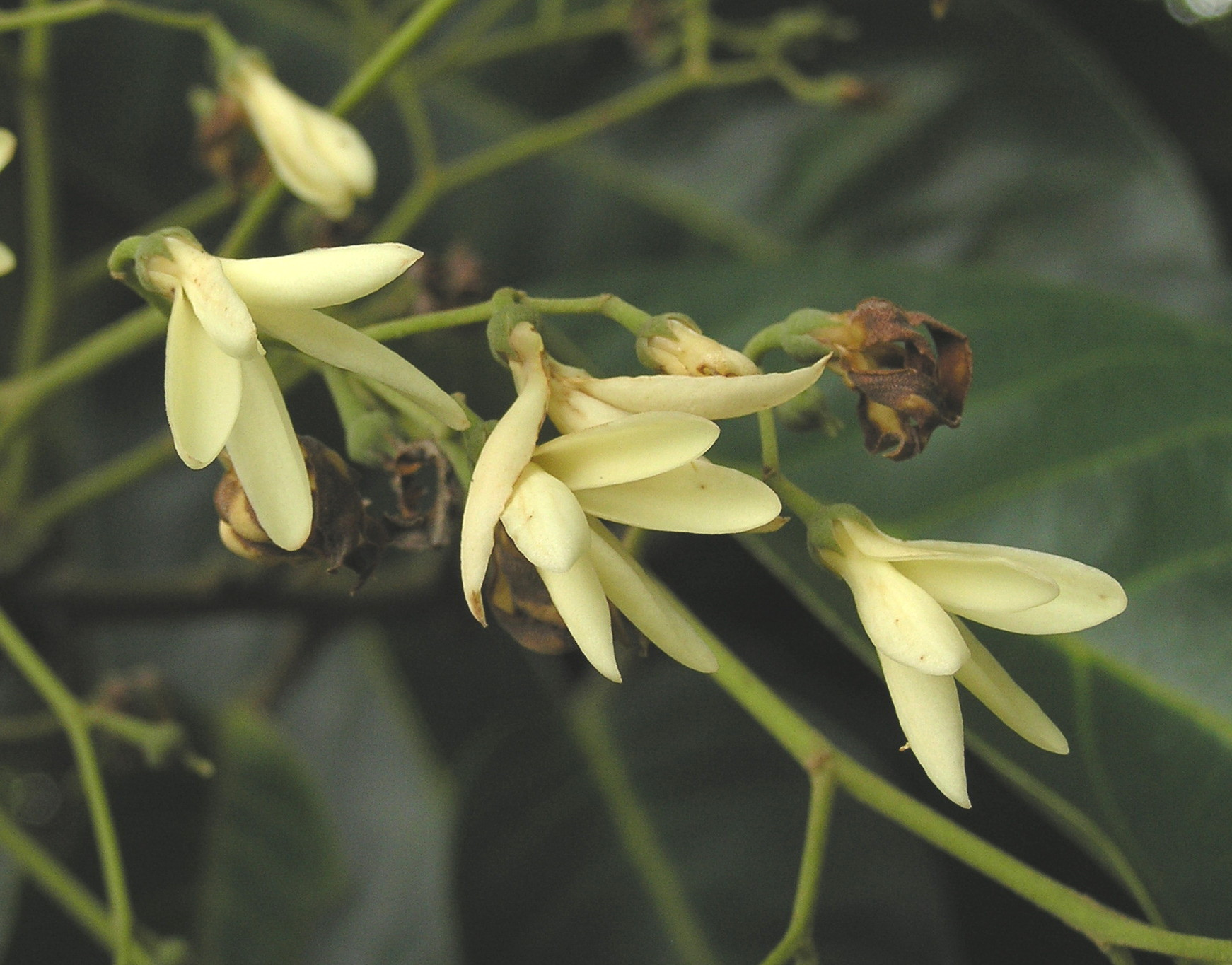
Vatica rassak

As of September 2026, Plants of the World Online accepted the following 79 species:

- Vatica abang-zoharii Meekiong, Latiff & Yahud
- Vatica abdulrahmaniana Chua
- Vatica acrocarpa Slooten
- Vatica adenanii Meekiong, Nizam, Latiff, Tawan & Yahud
- Vatica affinis Thwaites
- Vatica albiramis Slooten
- Vatica badiifolia P.S.Ashton
- Vatica bantamensis (Hassk.) Benth. & Hook.f. ex Miq.
- Vatica bella Slooten
- Vatica borneensis Burck
- Vatica brevipes P.S.Ashton
- Vatica brunigii P.S.Ashton
- Vatica cauliflora P.S.Ashton
- Vatica chartacea P.S.Ashton
- Vatica chevalieri (Gagnep.) Smitinand
- Vatica chinensis L.
- Vatica compressa P.S.Ashton
- Vatica congesta P.S.Ashton
- Vatica coriacea P.S.Ashton
- Vatica cuneata El-Taguri & Latiff
- Vatica cuspidata (Ridl.) Desch
- Vatica diospyroides Symington
- Vatica dulitensis Symington
- Vatica elliptica Foxw.
- Vatica endertii Slooten
- Vatica flavida Foxw.
- Vatica flavovirens Slooten
- Vatica glabrata P.S.Ashton
- Vatica globosa P.S.Ashton
- Vatica granulata Slooten
- Vatica griffithii Brandis
- Vatica guangxiensis X.L.Mo
- Vatica harmandiana Pierre
- Vatica havilandii Brandis
- Vatica heteroptera Symington
- Vatica hullettii (Ridl.) P.S.Ashton
- Vatica javanica Slooten
- Vatica kanthanensis Saw
- Vatica lanceifolia (Roxb.) Blume
- Vatica latiffii Meekiong
- Vatica lobata Foxw.
- Vatica lowii King
- Vatica maingayi Dyer
- Vatica mangachapoi Blanco
- Vatica maritima Slooten
- Vatica mendozae H.G.Gut., Rojo & Madulid
- Vatica micrantha Slooten
- Vatica mizaniana Chua
- Vatica najibiana Ummul-Nazrah
- Vatica nitens King
- Vatica oblongifolia Hook.f.
- Vatica obovata Slooten
- Vatica obscura Trimen
- Vatica odorata (Griff.) Symington
- Vatica pachyphylla Merr.
- Vatica pallida Dyer
- Vatica paludosa Kosterm.
- Vatica palungensis P.S.Ashton
- Vatica parvifolia P.S.Ashton
- Vatica patentinervia P.S.Ashton
- Vatica pauciflora (Korth.) Blume
- Vatica pedicellata Brandis
- Vatica pentandra P.S.Ashton
- Vatica philastreana Pierre
- Vatica rassak (Korth.) Blume
- Vatica ridleyana Brandis
- Vatica rotata P.S.Ashton
- Vatica rynchocarpa P.S.Ashton
- Vatica sarawakensis F.Heim
- Vatica scortechinii (King) Ridl.
- Vatica soepadmoi P.S.Ashton
- Vatica spatulata El-Taguri & Latiff
- Vatica stapfiana (King) Slooten
- Vatica subglabra Merr.
- Vatica teysmanniana Burck
- Vatica umbonata (Hook.f.) Burck
- Vatica venulosa Blume
- Vatica vinosa P.S.Ashton
- Vatica yeechongii Saw
