= Vatica borneensis =

Conservation status
- Near Threatened (IUCN 3.1)

Scientific classification
- Kingdom: Plantae
- Clade: Embryophytes
- Clade: Tracheophytes
- Clade: Spermatophytes
- Clade: Angiosperms
- Clade: Eudicots
- Clade: Rosids
- Order: Malvales
- Family: Dipterocarpaceae
- Genus: Vatica
- Species: V. borneensis

Binomial name
- Vatica borneensis Burck

Synonyms
- Sunaptea borneensis (Burck) F.Heim; Sunaptea urbani (F.Heim) F.Heim; Vatica urbani F.Heim

Species of tree

Vatica borneensis is a tree in the family Dipterocarpaceae, native to Borneo.

== Description ==
Vatica borneensis grows up to 35 metres (110 ft) tall, with a trunk diameter of up to 70 cm (30 in). Its coriaceous leaves are elliptic and measure up to 10 cm (4 in) long. The inflorescences are dense and bear pinkish brown flowers.

== Distribution and habitat ==
Vatica borneensis is endemic to Borneo. Its habitat is dipterocarp forests, at elevations to 900 m (3,000 ft).

== Conservation ==
Vatica borneensis has been assessed as near threatened on the IUCN Red List. It is threatened by logging for its timber, which is used for flooring and furniture. However, the species is found in protected areas.
