= Vatica latiffii =

Scientific classification
- Kingdom: Plantae
- Clade: Embryophytes
- Clade: Tracheophytes
- Clade: Angiosperms
- Clade: Eudicots
- Clade: Rosids
- Order: Malvales
- Family: Dipterocarpaceae
- Genus: Vatica
- Species: V. latiffii

Binomial name
- Vatica latiffii Meekiong

Species of flowering plant

Vatica latiffii is a species of dipterocarp tree endemic to the Malaysian state of Sarawak in northern Borneo.

The species was described by Kalu Meekiong in 2015.
