= Vatica brevipes =

Conservation status
- Near Threatened (IUCN 3.1)

Scientific classification
- Kingdom: Plantae
- Clade: Embryophytes
- Clade: Tracheophytes
- Clade: Spermatophytes
- Clade: Angiosperms
- Clade: Eudicots
- Clade: Rosids
- Order: Malvales
- Family: Dipterocarpaceae
- Genus: Vatica
- Species: V. brevipes

Binomial name
- Vatica brevipes P.S.Ashton

Synonyms
- Sunaptea brevipes (P.S.Ashton) Kosterm.

Species of tree

Vatica brevipes is a tree in the family Dipterocarpaceae, native to Borneo. The specific epithet brevipes means "short foot", referring to the petiole.

== Description ==
Vatica brevipes grows up to 25 metres (80 ft) tall, with a trunk diameter of up to 30 cm (12 in). Its chartaceous leaves are elliptic to obovate and measure up to 13 cm (5 in) long. The inflorescences bear cream flowers.

== Distribution and habitat ==
Vatica brevipes is endemic to Borneo. Its habitat is mixed dipterocarp forest, at elevations of 250–1,300 m (800–4,300 ft).

== Conservation ==
Vatica brevipes has been assessed as near threatened on the IUCN Red List. It is threatened mainly by land conversion for agriculture and palm oil plantations.
