= Vatica adenanii =

Conservation status
- Critically Endangered (IUCN 3.1)

Scientific classification
- Kingdom: Plantae
- Clade: Tracheophytes
- Clade: Angiosperms
- Clade: Eudicots
- Clade: Rosids
- Order: Malvales
- Family: Dipterocarpaceae
- Genus: Vatica
- Species: V. adenanii

Binomial name
- Vatica adenanii Meekiong, Nizam, Latiff, Tawan & Yahud

Species of tree native to Sarawak

Vatica adenanii is a tree in the family Dipterocarpaceae. It is endemic to Borneo, where it grows only in Sarawak, Malaysia.

Vatica adenanii is a small tree. It is known only from a single collection in Sampadi Forest Reserve in Sarawak. It grows in lowland kerangas forests over infertile sandy soils below 100 metres elevation.

The species is threatened by habitat loss from deforestation for logging and conversion to agriculture.
