= Vatica odorata =

Conservation status
- Least Concern (IUCN 3.1)

Scientific classification
- Kingdom: Plantae
- Clade: Tracheophytes
- Clade: Angiosperms
- Clade: Eudicots
- Clade: Rosids
- Order: Malvales
- Family: Dipterocarpaceae
- Genus: Vatica
- Species: V. odorata

Binomial name
- Vatica odorata (Griff.) Symington

Synonyms
- Anisoptera odorata (Griff.) Kurz; Sunaptea odorata Griff.

Species of tree

Vatica odorata is a tree in the family Dipterocarpaceae. The specific epithet odorata means 'scented', referring to the flowers.

== Description ==
Vatica odorata grows as a canopy tree up to 40 metres (130 ft) tall, with a trunk diameter of up to 60 cm (24 in). The twigs are often flaky. The leathery leaves are ovate to elliptic and measure up to 16 cm (6 in) long.

== Distribution and habitat ==
Vatica odorata is native to an area from northeastern India to Indochina and south to Malesia (Borneo, Peninsular Malaysia, and the Philippines). Its habitat is mixed dipterocarp forests, to elevations of 1,900 m (6,200 ft).

== Subspecies ==
Plants of the World Online recognises the following subspecies:

- Vatica odorata subsp. brevipetiolata P.H.Hô – Vietnam
- Vatica odorata subsp. mindanensis (Foxw.) P.S.Ashton – Borneo, Philippines
- Vatica odorata subsp. odorata
