= Keledang Range =

Mountain range in Malaysia

Coordinates: 4°38′30″N 101°00′00″E

The Keledang Range (Malay: Banjaran Keledang; Jawi: بنجرن كليدڠ), alternatively spelled as Kledang, is a 38-kilometre-long (24 mi), northeast–southwest oriented mountain range running between Kinta and Kuala Kangsar Districts in the state of Perak, Malaysia. It is one of the two principal mountain ranges that define the Kinta Valley, the other one being the Titiwangsa Mountains to its east.

The Keledang begins in the northeast at Sungai Siput, running along the western edge of Ipoh and terminates near Siputeh.

The Menora Tunnel of the North–South Expressway traverses through the Keledang Range, linking Ipoh with Kuala Kangsar.

Within the Keledang Range is the Kledang Saiong Forest Reserve, which was established in 1952 and is currently an IUCN la strict nature reserve. Plants species found in the reserve include Cleistanthus glandulosus, Diospyros gambleana, Haliciopsis cockburnii, Diplodiscus scortechinii, and Kopsia larutensis. The tree Vatica abdulrahmaniana is endemic to the forest reserve. Mammals found in the reserve include various primates, wild pig, civets, and yellow-throated martens.

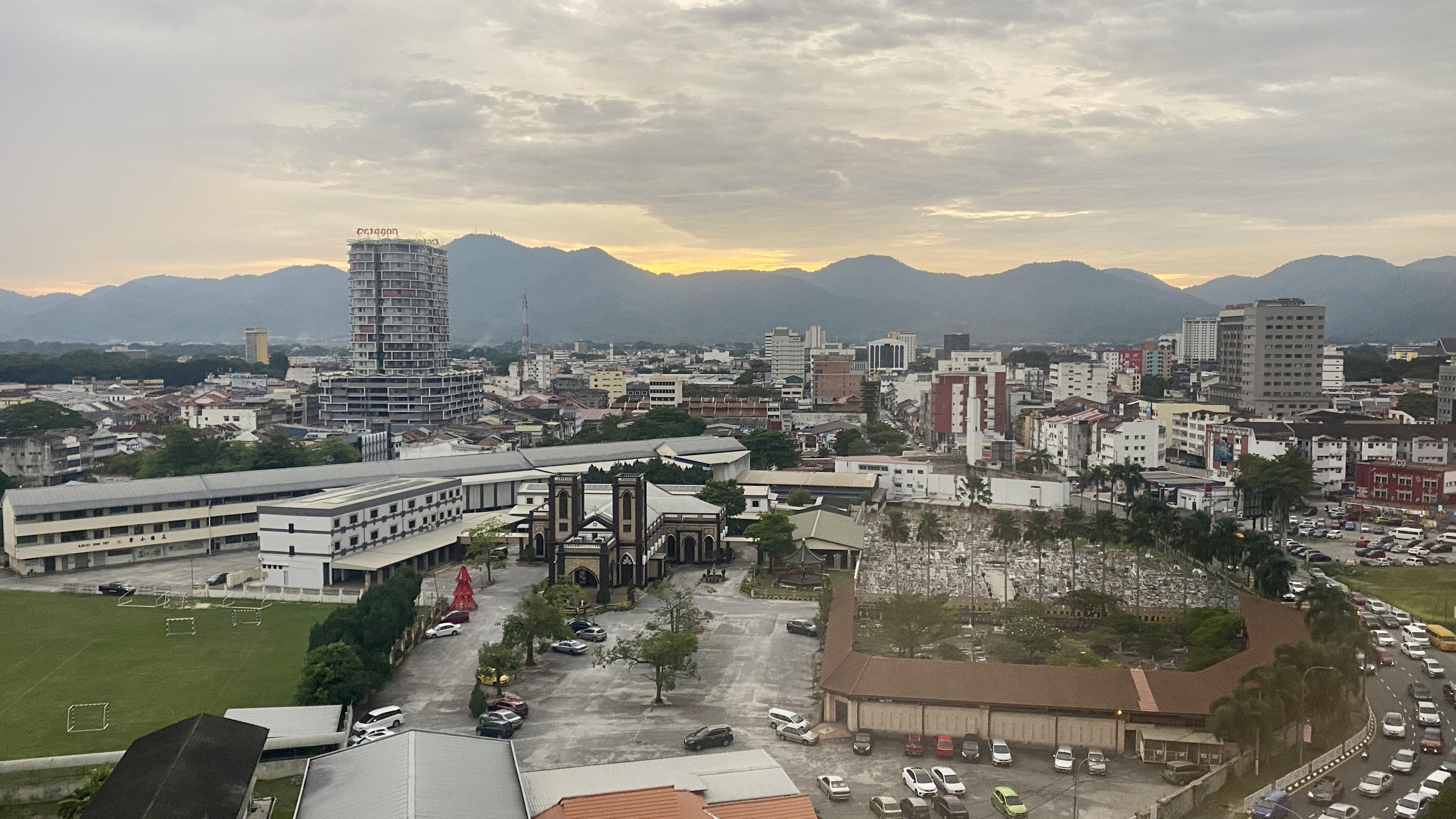
The Keledang Range dominates the skyline of Ipoh.
