= Mount Dulit =

Mountain in Borneo

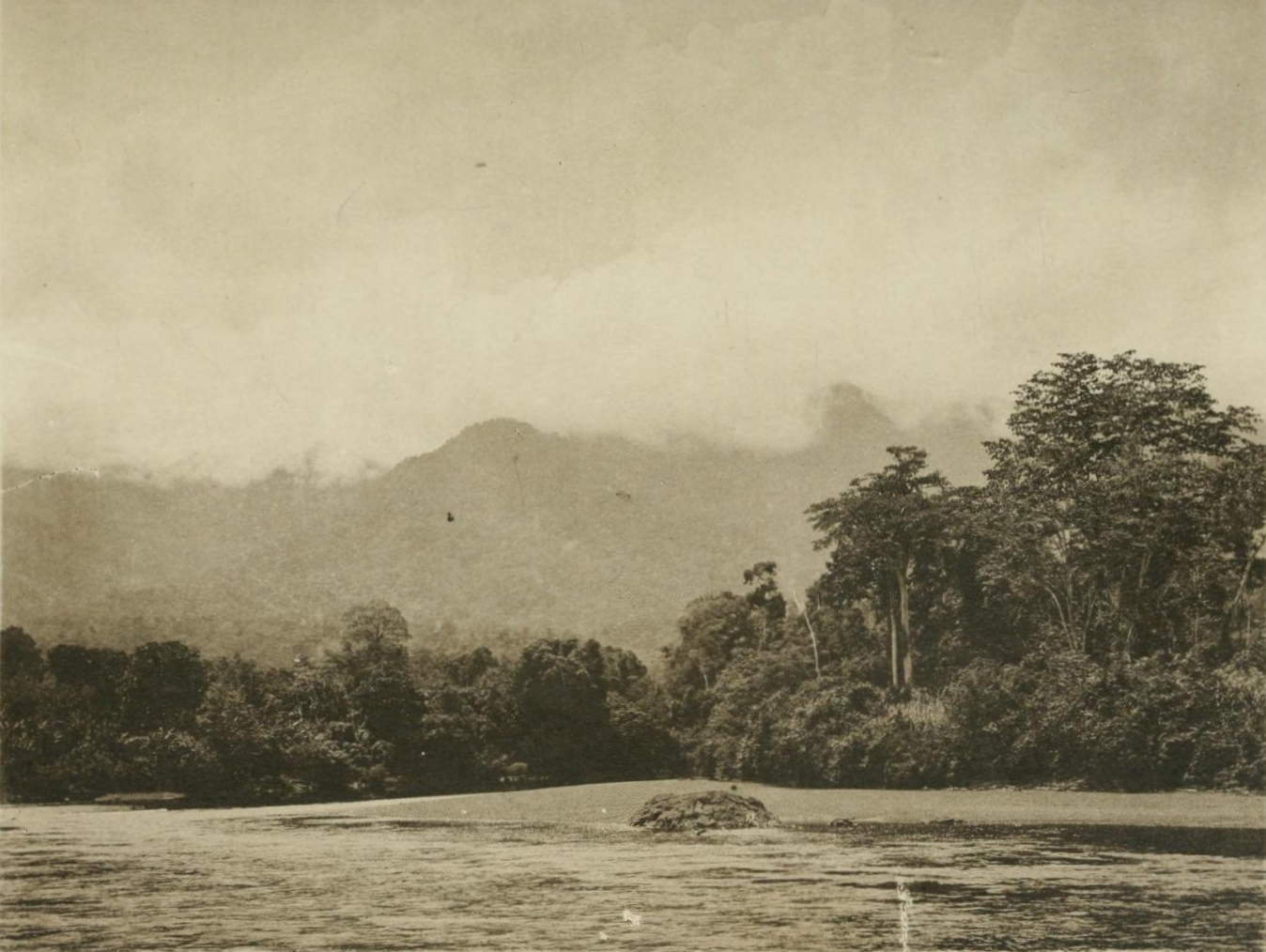
- From the Tinjar River, 1912

Highest point
- Elevation: 1,311 m (4,301 ft)
- Coordinates: 3°20′N 114°09′E

Geography
- Location: Sarawak, Borneo

Mount Dulit is a mountain in Borneo. It peaks at 1,311 metres (4,301 ft) above sea level and stands at the head of the Baram River in northern Sarawak, Malaysia. It is a western outlier of the Bornean cordillera and is largely covered with montane tropical rainforest. It has given its name to various plants and animals including the Dulit frogmouth (Batrachostomus harterti), Dulit partridge (Rhizothera dulitensis), the frog Zhangixalus dulitensis, the caecilian Ichthyophis dulitensis, the trilobite beetle genus Duliticola and the Vatica dulitensis tree. It is the site from which Charles Hose collected the holotype specimen of the rare and elusive Hose's palm civet (Diplogale hosei) in 1891.
