= Dirk Fok van Slooten =

Dutch botanist

Dirk Fok van Slooten (1891, Amersfoort, the Netherlands – 1953, Amsterdam, the Netherlands) was a Dutch botanist. He obtained a doctorate from Utrecht University in 1919. In 1948 he became acting director of the Buitenzorg Botanical Gardens (now Bogor Botanical Gardens) in Java.

Van Slooten named over 130 plant species, including species such as Dipterocarpus borneensis. The species Shorea slootenii is named for him.

== Selected bibliography ==
- The Flacourtiaceae of the Dutch East Indies, 1925
- The Dipterocarpaceae of the Dutch East Indies, 1926
- Ridley and the Flora of the Netherlands Indies, 1935
