= List of Nature Conservation Act rare flora of Queensland =

This is a list of the flora of Queensland listed as Rare under the Nature Conservation Act 1992. (The Rare category is gradually being phased out in favour of the Near Threatened category.)

== A ==
- Acacia arbiana
- Acacia acrionastes
- Acacia albizioides
- Acacia armillata
- Acacia armitii
- Acacia brunioides
- Acacia calantha
- Acacia centrinervia
- Acacia fleckeri
- Acacia gittinsii
- Acacia hockingsii
- Acacia homaloclada
- Acacia hylonoma
- Acacia islana
- Acacia jackesiana
- Acacia latisepala
- Acacia longipedunculata
- Acacia meiosperma
- Acacia ommatosperma
- Acacia orites
- Acacia pedleyi
- Acacia pennata subsp. kerrii
- Acacia polyadenia
- Acacia pubicosta
- Acacia spania
- Acacia sp. (Castletower N.Gibson TOI345)
- Acacia storyi
- Acacia strongylophylla
- Acacia tenuinervis
- Aceratium ferrugineum
- Aceratium sericoleopsis
- Acianthus amplexicaulis
- Acianthus sublestus
- Acmena mackinnoniana
- Acmenosperma pringlei
- Acomis acoma
- Acronychia acuminata
- Acronychia baeuerlenii
- Acronychia eungellensis
- Acrotriche baileyana
- Actephila sessilifolia
- Actinotus paddisonii
- Agathis microstachya
- Aglaia argentea
- Aglaia brassii
- Albizia retusa
- Albizia sp. (Windsor Tableland B.Gray 2181)
- Alectryon semicinereus
- Alectryon tropicus
- Allocasuarina filidens
- Allocasuarina rupicola
- Alloxylon pinnatum
- Alpinia hylandii
- Alyxia magnifolia
- Alyxia sharpei
- Amomum dallachyi
- Amomum queenslandicum
- Anacolosa papuana
- Angianthus brachypappus
- Antrophyum plantagineum
- Antrophyum subfalcatum
- Apatophyllum sp. (Bull Creek A.R.Bean 2225)
- Apatophyllum sp. (Expedition Range E.J.Thompson AQ440723)
- Aphyllorchis anomala
- Aphyllorchis queenslandica
- Apluda mutica
- Aponogeton elongatus
- Aponogeton queenslandicus
- Archidendron hirsutum
- Archidendron muellerianum
- Archidendropsis xanthoxylon
- Ardisia bakeri
- Ardisia fasciculata
- Arenga microcarpa
- Argophyllum cryptophlebum
- Argophyllum nullumense
- Argophyllum verae
- Argyreia queenslandica
- Argyrodendron sp. (Boonjie B.P.Hyland RFK2139)
- Argyrodendron sp. (Whyanbeel B.P.Hyland RFK1106)
- Aristida burraensis
- Aristida forsteri
- Aristida thompsonii
- Artabotrys sp. (Claudie River B.Gray 3240)
- Arthragrostis clarksoniana
- Arundinella grevillensis
- Arundinella montana
- Arytera dictyoneura
- Asplenium athertonense
- Asplenium excisum
- Asplenium normale
- Astonia australiensis
- Atalaya calcicola
- Atalaya rigida
- Atriplex fissivalvis
- Atriplex lobativalvis
- Atriplex morrisii
- Austrobuxus megacarpus
- Austrobuxus swainii
- Austromuellera trinervia
- Austromuellera valida
- Austromyrtus inophloia
- Austromyrtus lucida
- Austromyrtus sp. (Bamaga B.P.Hyland 10235)
- Austromyrtus sp. (Blackall Range P.R.Sharpe 5387)
- Austromyrtus sp. (McIlwraith Range B.P.Hyland 11148)
- Austromyrtus sp. (Mt Lewis B.Gray 831)
- Austromyrtus sp. (Upper Mudgeeraba Creek N.B.Byrnes+ 4069)

== B ==
- Babingtonia brachypoda
- Bambusa forbesii
- Banksia plagiocarpa
- Barongia lophandra
- Beilschmiedia castrisinensis
- Beilschmiedia volckii
- Berrya rotundifolia
- Bertya glandulosa
- Bertya pedicellata
- Bertya sharpeana
- Bertya sp. (Amiens L.Pedley 1488)
- Beyeria sp. (Bull Creek Gorge B.O'Keeffe 573)
- Blandfordia grandiflora
- Blechnum ambiguum
- Bonamia dietrichiana
- Boronia amabilis
- Boronia eriantha
- Boronia rivularis
- Boronia squamipetala
- Borya inopinata
- Bossiaea arenicola
- Brachychiton albidus
- Brachychiton collinus
- Brachychiton compactus
- Brachychiton grandiflorus
- Brachychiton velutinosus
- Brachychiton vitifolius
- Brachyscome ascendens
- Brachyscome eriogona
- Brachyscome tesquorum
- Brasenia schreberi
- Brownlowia argentata
- Bubbia queenslandiana
- Bubbia whiteana
- Buchanania mangoides
- Buckinghamia ferruginiflora
- Bulbophyllum argyropus
- Bulbophyllum boonjee
- Bulbophyllum globuliforme
- Bulbophyllum grandimesense
- Bulbophyllum windsorense
- Bulbophyllum wolfei

== C ==
- Cadetia collinsii
- Cadetia wariana
- Caesalpinia hymenocarpa
- Caesalpinia robusta
- Cajanus lanuginosus
- Calamus aruensis
- Callerya australis, synonym of Austrocallerya australis
- Callerya pilipes, synonym of Austrocallerya pilipes
- Callicarpa thozetii
- Callistemon chisholmii
- Callistemon flavovirens
- Callistemon formosus
- Callistemon pearsonii
- Callitris baileyi
- Callitris monticola
- Calocephalus sonderi
- Calocephalus sp. (Eulo M.E.Ballingall MEB2590)
- Calochlaena villosa
- Calotis glabrescens
- Calotis suffruticosa
- Calytrix islensis
- Capparis sp. (Gloucester Island G.N.Batianoff 920912)
- Carex breviscapa
- Carex cruciata
- Cartonema brachyantherum
- Cassia brewsteri var. marksiana
- Cassia sp. (Paluma Range G.Sankowsky+ 450)
- Cassinia collina
- Cecarria obtusifolia
- Centotheca philippinensis
- Ceratopetalum corymbosum
- Ceratopetalum macrophyllum
- Cerbera dumicola
- Chiloglottis longiclavata
- Choricarpia subargentea
- Chrysophyllum roxburghii
- Cinnamomum propinquum
- Citrus garrawayi
- Cleistanthus discolor
- Cleistanthus myrianthus
- Combretum trifoliatum
- Comesperma breviflorum
- Comesperma praecelsum
- Conospermum burgessiorum
- Corchorus hygrophilus
- Corsia sp. (Herberton Range B.Gray 3994)
- Corybas abellianus
- Corybas neocaledonicus
- Corymbia gilbertensis
- Corymbia petalophylla
- Corymbia scabrida
- Corynocarpus rupestris subsp. arborescens
- Crepidium fimbriatum
- Crepidium flavovirens
- Crepidomanes digitatum
- Crepidomanes endlicherianum
- Crepidomanes majoriae
- Crepidomanes pallidum
- Croton brachypus
- Croton densivestitus
- Croton stockeri
- Crudia papuana
- Cryptandra lanosiflora
- Cryptandra sp. (Gurulmundi G.W.Althofer 8418)
- Cryptandra sp. (Mt Mulligan J.R.Clarkson 5949)
- Cryptandra sp. (Thulimbah C.Schindler 6)
- Cryptocarya burckiana
- Cryptocarya claudiana
- Cryptocarya floydii
- Cryptocarya glaucocarpa
- Cryptolepis grayi
- Cupaniopsis newmanii
- Cyathea baileyana
- Cyathea celebica
- Cyathea cunninghamii
- Cycas brunnea
- Cycas couttsiana
- Cycas media subsp. ensata
- Cyperus rupicola

== D ==
- Dactyliophora novae-guineae
- Dallwatsonia felliana
- Dansiea elliptica
- Dansiea grandiflora
- Dendrobium fellowsii
- Dendrobium malbrownii
- Dendrobium schneiderae var. schneiderae
- Dendromyza reinwardtiana
- Derwentia arenaria
- Desmodium macrocarpum
- Dianella fruticans
- Dianella incollata
- Dichanthium setosum
- Didymoplexis pallens
- Digitaria porrecta
- Diospyros sp. (Bamaga B.P.Hyland 2517)
- Diospyros sp. (Mt Lewis L.S.Smith 10107)
- Diospyros sp. (Mt Spurgeon C.T.White 10677)
- Diploglottis harpullioides
- Diploglottis pedleyi
- Dipodium pulchellum
- Dipteris conjugata
- Discaria pubescens
- Diuris oporina
- Diuris parvipetala
- Dockrillia wassellii
- Dodonaea biloba
- Dodonaea hirsuta
- Dodonaea macrossanii
- Dodonaea oxyptera
- Dodonaea uncinata
- Dolichandrone spathacea
- Dracophyllum sayeri
- Drosera adelae
- Drummondita calida
- Dryopteris hasseltii
- Durringtonia paludosa

== E - F ==
- Eidothea zoexylocarya
- Elacholoma hornii
- Elaeocarpus coorangooloo
- Elaeocarpus johnsonii
- Elaeocarpus stellaris
- Elaeocarpus thelmae
- Elaphoglossum callifolium
- Eleocharis blakeana
- Endiandra anthropophagorum
- Endiandra bellendenkerana
- Endiandra collinsii
- Endiandra dichrophylla
- Endiandra globosa
- Endiandra grayi
- Endiandra introrsa
- Endiandra jonesii
- Endiandra microneura
- Endiandra phaeocarpa
- Endiandra sideroxylon
- Eremochloa ciliaris
- Eremophila alatisepala
- Eria dischorensis
- Eria irukandjiana
- Etlingera australasica
- Eucalyptus codonocarpa
- Eucalyptus curtisii
- Eucalyptus decolor
- Eucalyptus dunnii
- Eucalyptus howittiana
- Eucalyptus lockyeri
- Eucalyptus mensalis
- Eucalyptus michaeliana
- Eucalyptus pachycalyx subsp. pachycalyx
- Eucalyptus quadricostata
- Eucalyptus rubiginosa
- Eucalyptus sicilifolia
- Eucalyptus sphaerocarpa
- Eulophia bicallosa
- Eulophia zollingeri
- Euodia sp. (Noah Creek B.P.Hyland 5987)
- Euonymus globularis
- Euphorbia sarcostemmoides
- Euphrasia orthocheila

== F - G ==
- Fatoua pilosa
- Ficus melinocarpa var. hololampra
- Fimbristylis distincta
- Fimbristylis micans
- Fimbristylis odontocarpa
- Fimbristylis vagans
- Firmiana papuana
- Flindersia brassii
- Flindersia oppositifolia
- Frankenia scabra
- Gahnia insignis
- Garcinia brassii
- Gardenia rupicola
- Gardenia scabrella
- Garnotia stricta var. longiseta
- Gastrodia crebriflora
- Gastrodia queenslandica
- Gastrodia urceolata
- Gen.(AQ20546) sp. (Mt Hemmant L.J.Webb+ 10908)
- Gen.(AQ385424) sp. (McDowall Range J.G.Tracey 14552)
- Gen.(AQ95272) sp. (Boonjie B.P.Hyland 6589)
- Genoplesium alticola
- Genoplesium pedersonii
- Genoplesium sigmoideum
- Genoplesium validum
- Globba marantina
- Glochidion pruinosum
- Glochidion pungens
- Glossocardia orthochaeta
- Glycine argyrea
- Gompholobium virgatum var. emarginatum
- Gonocarpus effusus
- Goodenia angustifolia
- Goodenia arenicola
- Goodenia heteroptera
- Goodenia paludicola
- Goodenia stirlingii
- Goodyera grandis
- Goodyera viridiflora
- Gossypium sturtianum
- Gouania australiana
- Grammitis albosetosa
- Grammitis leonardii
- Graptophyllum excelsum
- Grevillea cyranostigma
- Grevillea singuliflora
- Grewia graniticola
- Gymnostoma australianum

== H ==
- Habenaria divaricata
- Habenaria hymenophylla
- Habenaria rumphii
- Habenaria xanthantha
- Hakea macrorhyncha
- Haplostichanthus sp. (Cooper Creek B.Gray 2433)
- Haplostichanthus sp. (Mt Finnigan L.W.Jessup 632)
- Haplostichanthus sp. (Topaz L.W.Jessup 520)
- Hardenbergia sp. (Mt Mulligan J.R.Clarkson 5775)
- Harpullia ramiflora
- Hedyotis philippensis
- Helicia ferruginea
- Helicia grayi
- Helicia lamingtoniana
- Helicia lewisensis
- Helicia recurva
- Helmholtzia glaberrima
- Hernandia bivalvis
- Heptapleurum bractescens
- Heterachne baileyi
- Hibbertia cymosa
- Hibbertia echiifolia
- Hibbertia elata
- Hibbertia hexandra
- Hibbertia monticola
- Hollandaea sayeriana
- Hollandaea riparia
- Homoranthus decasetus
- Homoranthus papillatus
- Homoranthus tropicus
- Homoranthus zeteticorum
- Hoya anulata
- Hoya macgillivrayi
- Hoya revoluta
- Huperzia phlegmaria
- Huperzia varia
- Hymenophyllum eboracense
- Hymenophyllum gracilescens
- Hymenophyllum kerianum
- Hypserpa smilacifolia

== I - L ==
- Ichnanthus pallens var. majus
- Ilex sp. (Gadgarra B.P.Hyland RFK2011)
- Indigofera baileyi
- Ipomoea antonschmidii
- Ipomoea saintronanensis
- Ipomoea stolonifera
- Isotropis foliosa
- Jagera javanica subsp. australiana
- Kohautia australiensis
- Kunzea bracteolata
- Kunzea calida
- Kunzea flavescens
- Kunzea sp. (Herbert River R.J.Cumming 11309)
- Kunzea sp. (Dicks Tableland A.R.Bean 3672)
- Labichea brassii
- Labichea buettneriana
- Lasianthus cyanocarpus
- Lastreopsis grayi
- Lastreopsis silvestris
- Lastreopsis tinarooensis
- Lastreopsis walleri
- Leionema ambiens
- Leionema gracile
- Lenbrassia australiana
- Lepidagathis royenii
- Lepiderema hirsuta
- Lepiderema largiflorens
- Lepiderema pulchella
- Leptosema chapmanii
- Leptospermum luehmannii
- Leptospermum oreophilum
- Leptospermum pallidum
- Leptospermum purpurascens
- Lepturus geminatus
- Lepturus xerophilus
- Leucopogon cicatricatus
- Leucopogon grandiflorus
- Leucopogon malayanus subsp. novoguineensis
- Lindsaea terrae–reginae
- Lindsaea walkerae
- Linospadix microcaryus
- Linospadix palmeriana
- Liparis condylobulbon
- Liparis simmondsii
- Litsea granitica
- Litsea macrophylla
- Livistona fulva
- Livistona nitida Carnarvon fan palm
- Livistona sp. (Cooktown A.K.Irvine 2178)
- Livistona sp. (Eungella A.N.Rodd 3798)
- Lobelia douglasiana
- Logania cordifolia
- Lomandra teres
- Lycopodiella limosa
- Lysiana filifolia

== M - O ==
- Macadamia grandis
- Macaranga polyadenia
- Macarthuria complanata
- Macarthuria ephedroides
- Macropteranthes fitzalanii
- Macropteranthes leiocaulis
- Macrozamia cardiacensis
- Macrozamia longispina
- Mammea touriga
- Margaritaria indica
- Marsdenia hemiptera
- Medicosma glandulosa
- Medicosma riparia
- Megahertzia amplexicaulis
- Meiogyne sp. (Henrietta Creek L.W.Jessup 512)
- Melaleuca cheelii
- Melaleuca groveana
- Melaleuca tamariscina subsp. irbyana
- Mesua larnachiana
- Microsorum membranifolium
- Mirbelia confertiflora
- Mischarytera macrobotrys
- Mischocarpus albescens
- Mitrantia bilocularis
- Momordica cochinchinensis
- Muellerina myrtifolia
- Mukia sp. (Little Annan River B.Gray 101)
- Musa jackeyi
- Myriophyllum implicatum
- Neosepicaea viticoides
- Neostrearia fleckeri
- Nervilia crociformis
- Notelaea pungens
- Nothoalsomitra suberosa
- Oberonia carnosa
- Oeceoclades pulchra
- Oenanthe javanica
- Oenotrichia dissecta
- Oldenlandia polyclada
- Olearia gravis
- Olearia heterocarpa
- Omphalea papuana
- Operculina brownii
- Oreodendron biflorum
- Ozothamnus whitei

== P ==
- Pachystoma pubescens
- Pandanus gemmifer
- Pandanus zea
- Panicum chillagoanum
- Pandorea baileyana
- Papillilabium beckleri
- Paramapania parvibractea
- Pararistolochia laheyana, synonym of Aristolochia laheyana
- Pararistolochia praevenosa, synonym of Aristolochia praevenosa
- Parsonsia blakeana
- Parsonsia largiflorens
- Parsonsia lenticellata
- Parsonsia tenuis
- Parsonsia wildensis
- Paspalidium scabrifolium
- Paspalidium spartellum
- Paspalum multinodum
- Peperomia bellendenkerensis
- Peripentadenia mearsii
- Peripentadenia phelpsii
- Peripleura scabra
- Peripleura sericea
- Peristylus banfieldii
- Persoonia amaliae
- Persoonia daphnoides
- Persoonia volcanica
- Phylacium bracteosum
- Phyllanthus brassii
- Phyllanthus disticha
- Phyllanthus sauropodoides
- Phyllanthus sp. (Bulburin P.I.Forster+ PIF16034)
- Phyllodium pulchellum var. pulchellum
- Picris conyzoides
- Pimelea leptospermoides
- Pimelea umbratica
- Pimelodendron amboinicum
- Piper mestonii
- Pittosporum oreillyanum
- Pouteria xylocarpa
- Plectranthus alloplectus native coleus
- Plectranthus arenicola
- Plectranthus blakei
- Plectranthus graniticola
- Plectranthus minutus
- Plectranthus spectabilis
- Pneumatopteris costata
- Pneumatopteris pennigera
- Podolepis monticola
- Polyalthia sp. (Wyvuri B.P.Hyland RFK2632)
- Polygala pycnophylla
- Polyosma rigidiuscula
- Polyscias bellendenkerensis
- Pomaderris notata
- Pothos brassii
- Prasophyllum campestre
- Prasophyllum exilis
- Prasophyllum incompositum
- Pratia podenzanae
- Prostanthera atroviolacea
- Prostanthera sp. (Mt Mulligan J.R.Clarkson 5838)
- Prostanthera sp. (Wallangarra T.D.Stanley 7876)
- Prumnopitys ladei
- Pseudanthus sp. (Tylerville P.I.Forster+ PIF11510)
- Pseuduvaria froggattii
- Pseuduvaria hylandii
- Pseuduvaria mulgraveana
- Pseuduvaria villosa
- Psychotria lorentzii
- Pteridoblechnum acuminatum
- Pterocarpus sp. (Archer River B.P.Hyland 3078)
- Pterostylis longicurva
- Pterostylis nigricans
- Pterostylis setifera
- Pterostylis sp. (Gundiah W.W.Abell AQ72188)
- Pterostylis woollsii
- Ptilotus blakeanus
- Ptilotus brachyanthus
- Ptilotus extenuatus
- Ptilotus humifusus
- Ptilotus maconochiei
- Ptilotus pseudohelipteroides
- Ptilotus remotiflorus
- Pultenaea pycnocephala
- Pultenaea whiteana
- Pycnarrhena ozantha

== Q - S ==
- Quassia baileyana
- Randia audasii
- Remusatia vivipara
- Revwattsia fragilis
- Rhamphicarpa australiensis
- Rhizanthella slateri
- Rhodamnia glabrescens
- Rhodamnia maideniana
- Rhodamnia pauciovulata
- Rhodanthe rufescens
- Rhodomyrtus effusa
- Ristantia gouldii
- Ristantia waterhousei
- Robiquetia wassellii
- Rourea brachyandra
- Rulingia hermanniifolia
- Rulingia salviifolia
- Rutidosis crispata
- Rutidosis glandulosa
- Ryparosa javanica
- Ryticaryum longifolium
- Sarcolobus vittatus
- Sarcopteryx acuminata
- Sarcopteryx montana
- Sarcotoechia heterophylla
- Sarcotoechia villosa
- Sauropus macranthus
- Schizomeria whitei
- Schoenorchis sarcophylla
- Schoenus scabripes
- Sclerolaena blackiana
- Sclerolaena everistiana
- Scrotochloa tararaensis
- Scrotochloa urceolata
- Secamone auriculata
- Senna acclinis
- Sesbania erubescens
- Solanum callium
- Solanum dimorphispinum
- Solanum hamulosum
- Solanum multiglochidiatum
- Solanum sporadotrichum
- Spathoglottis paulinae
- Sphaerantia chartacea
- Sphaerantia discolor
- Sporobolus partimpatens
- Stackhousia tryonii
- Steganthera australiana
- Stenocarpus cryptocarpus
- Stenocarpus davallioides
- Sterculia shillinglawii subsp. shillinglawii
- Sticherus milnei
- Strongylodon lucidus
- Stylidium trichopodum
- Symplocos ampulliformis
- Symplocos crassiramifera
- Symplocos graniticola
- Symplocos harroldii
- Symplocos sp. (Mt Finnigan L.J.Brass 20129)
- Symplocos stawellii var. montana
- Syzygium aqueum
- Syzygium argyropedicum
- Syzygium buettnerianum
- Syzygium macilwraithianum
- Syzygium malaccense
- Syzygium pseudofastigiatum
- Syzygium rubrimolle

== T - Z ==
- Taeniophyllum confertum
- Taeniophyllum lobatum
- Tecomanthe hillii
- Tectaria siifolia
- Tephrosia baueri
- Tephrosia savannicola
- Tetramolopium sp. (Mt Bowen D.G.Fell+ DGF1224)
- Tetramolopium vagans
- Tetrasynandra sp. (Mt Lewis B.P.Hyland 1053)
- Thaleropia queenslandica
- Thelionema grande
- Thelasis carinata
- Thismia rodwayi
- Thryptomene hexandra
- Tiliacora australiana
- Tinospora angusta
- Torenia polygonoides
- Torrenticola queenslandica
- Trachymene geraniifolia
- Trachymene glandulosa
- Trianthema rhynchocalyptra
- Trichomanes mindorense
- Tristellateia australasiae
- Tristiropsis canarioides
- Uncaria cordata var. cordata
- Uromyrtus sp. (McPherson Range G.P.Guymer 2000)
- Vallisneria nana
- Vittadinia decora
- Wahlenbergia glabra
- Wahlenbergia islensis
- Wahlenbergia scopulicola
- Waterhousea mulgraveana
- Wendlandia basistaminea
- Wendlandia connata
- Westringia amabilis
- Westringia blakeana
- Westringia grandifolia
- Westringia sericea
- Whyanbeelia terrae-reginae
- Wilkiea wardellii
- Wilkiea sp. (Mt Lewis L.J.Webb+ 10501)
- Xanthophyllum fragrans
- Xanthostemon arenarius
- Xanthostemon verticillatus
- Xanthostemon graniticus
- Xanthostemon youngii
- Xanthostemon xerophilus
- Xylosma ovatum
- Xylosma sp. (Mt Lewis G.Sankowsky+ 1108)
- Zieria granulata var. adenodonta
- Zornia pallida
- Zornia pedunculata
