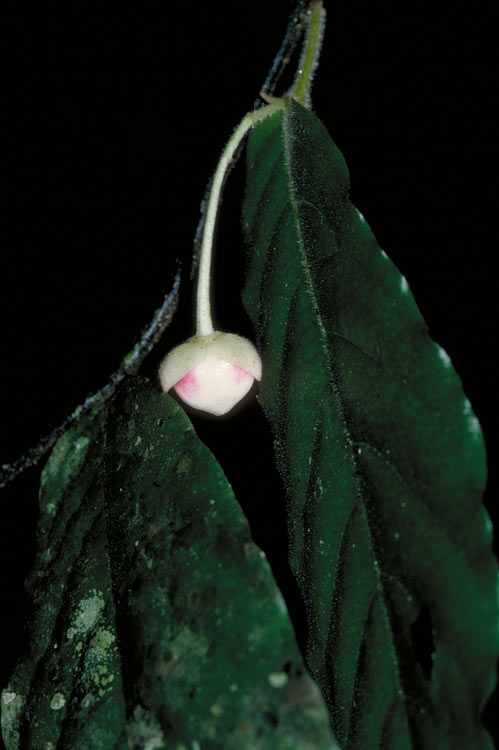

Scientific classification
- Kingdom: Plantae
- Clade: Tracheophytes
- Clade: Angiosperms
- Clade: Magnoliids
- Order: Magnoliales
- Family: Annonaceae
- Genus: Pseuduvaria
- Species: P. villosa

Binomial name
- Pseuduvaria villosa Jessup

= Pseuduvaria villosa =

Species of plant in the soursop family

Pseuduvaria villosa is a species of plant in the family Annonaceae. It is endemic to Australia. L.W. Jessup, the botanist who first formally described the species, named it after its leaves and branchlets which are shaggy with long soft hairs (villosus in Latin).

== Description ==
It is a small tree reaching 6 meters (20 ft) in height. The young, yellow-brown branches are sparsely to densely covered with long soft hairs. Its branches have sparse lenticels. Its egg-shaped to elliptical, papery leaves are 11–20 cm (4.3–7.9 in) by 5–9 cm (2.0–3.5 in). The leaves have rounded to heart-shaped bases and tapering tips, with the tapering portion 2–24 millimeters long. The leaves are nearly hairless on their upper surface covered with long soft hairs on their lower surface. The leaves have 8–14 pairs of secondary veins emanating from their midribs. Its very densely hairy petioles are 3–5 by 1.5–2.5 millimeters with a broad groove on their upper side. Its solitary Inflorescences occur on branches, and are organized on very densely hairy peduncles that are 4 by 0.6 millimeters. Each inflorescence has 1–2 flowers. Each flower is on a very densely hairy pedicel that is 31–40 by 0.7 millimeters. The pedicels are organized on a rachis up to 5 millimeters long that have up to 2 bracts. The pedicels have a medial, very densely hairy bract that is up to 1 millimeter long. Its flowers are unisexual. Its flowers have 3 free, triangular sepals, that are 2.5–3.5 by 2–3 millimeters. The sepals are hairless on their upper surface, densely hairy on their lower surface, and hairy at their margins. Its 6 petals are arranged in two rows of 3. The oval, outer petals are 6–7 by 5.5–6.5 millimeters with hairless upper and very densely hairy lower surfaces. The oval inner petals have a 1–1.5 millimeter long claw at their base and a 7.5–9 by 7-9 millimeter blade. The inner petals have flat bases and pointed tips. The inner petals are hairless on their upper surface except at the margins of the apex, and very densely hairy on their lower surfaces. The male flowers have up to 153 stamens that are 1.3-1.6-0.8 by 1-1.2 millimeters. Female flowers have up to 40 carpels. Each carpel has up to 1–2 ovules. The fruit occur in clusters of up to 3 and are organized on densely hairy peduncles that are 5 by 2 millimeters. The fruit are attached by densely hairy pedicles that are 38–40 by 1 millimeters. The orange, oval to elliptical fruit are 12–15 by 10 millimeters. The fruit are smooth, and very densely hairy. Each fruit typically has 1 spherical, wrinkly seed that is 7.5 by 7 by 1.1 millimeters. Each seed has a 1.2 by 0.3 millimeter elliptical hilum.

=== Reproductive biology ===
The pollen of P. villosa is shed as permanent tetrads.

== Habitat and distribution ==
It has been observed growing in loam, clay-loam and basalt-derived soils in dense vine forests at elevations of 80–700 meters (260–2,300 ft).

== Uses ==
Extracts from its leaves have been reported to contain bioactive compounds including caryophyllene and copaene.
