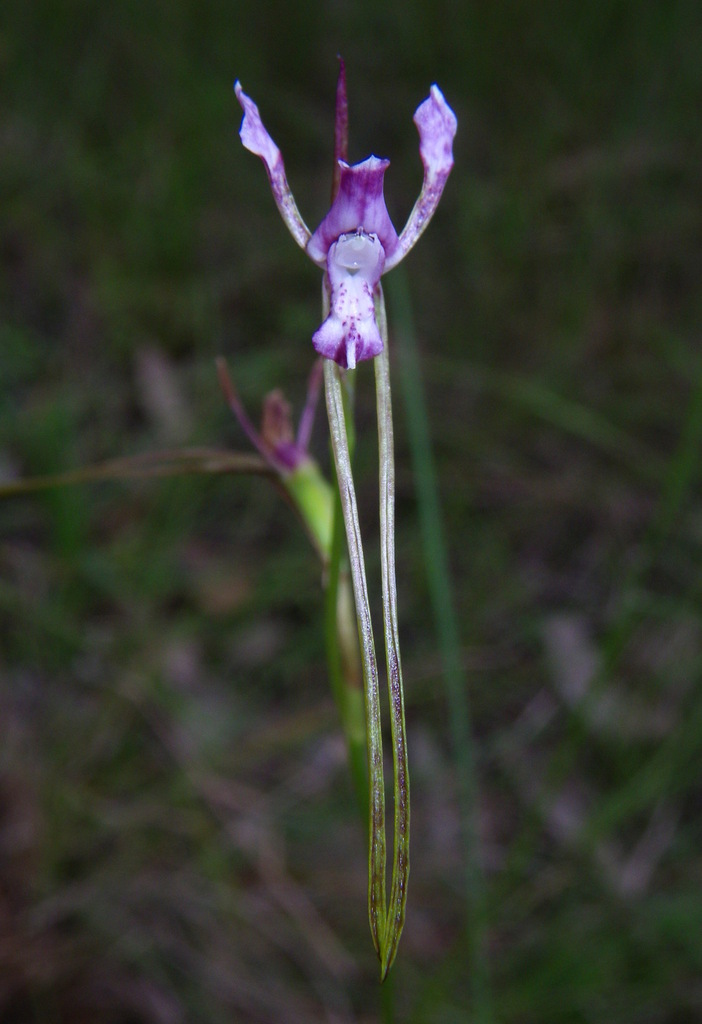
- On the Northern Tablelands of New South Wales

Scientific classification
- Kingdom: Plantae
- Clade: Embryophytes
- Clade: Tracheophytes
- Clade: Angiosperms
- Clade: Monocots
- Order: Asparagales
- Family: Orchidaceae
- Subfamily: Orchidoideae
- Tribe: Diurideae
- Genus: Diuris
- Species: D. parvipetala

Binomial name
- Diuris parvipetala (Dockrill)D.L.Jones & M.A.Clem.

= Diuris parvipetala =

Slender purple donkey orchid

Species of orchid

Diuris parvipetala, commonly known as slender purple donkey orchid, is a species of orchid that is endemic to eastern Australia. It usually has two leaves at its base and up to nine relatively small, whitish to mauve flowers with purple markings. It is an uncommon species found in northern New South Wales and southern Queensland.

== Description ==
Diuris parvipetala is a tuberous, perennial herb with two linear leaves 200–300 mm (8–10 in) long, 3–4 mm (0.1–0.2 in) wide and folded lengthwise. Up to nine whitish to mauve flowers with purple markings and 17–22 mm (0.7–0.9 in) wide are borne on a flowering stem 200–450 mm (8–20 in) tall. The dorsal sepal is angled upwards, 6–8 mm (0.2–0.3 in) long and about 5 mm (0.2 in) wide. The lateral sepals are 30–45 mm (1–2 in) long, about 1 mm (0.04 in) wide and turned downwards. The petals are oblong, 3–4 mm (0.1–0.2 in) long, 1–2 mm (0.04–0.08 in) wide and spread apart from each other on a purple-brown stalk 6–8.5 mm (0.2–0.3 in) long. The labellum is 5–6.5 mm (0.2–0.3 in) long and has three lobes. The centre lobe is spade-shaped, about 5 mm (0.2 in) long and 4–5 mm (0.16–0.20 in) wide with its tip turned downwards. The side lobes are about 2 mm (0.08 in) long and 1 mm (0.04 in) wide. There are between two thick, ridge-like calli 3–4 mm (0.1–0.2 in) long in the mid-line of the labellum. Flowering occurs from August to October.

== Taxonomy and naming ==
The slender purple donkey orchid was first formally described in 1964 by Alick Dockrill who gave it the name Diuris punctata var. parvipetala. The description was published in The Victorian Naturalist from a specimen collected near Brigooda. In 1987 David Jones and Mark Clements raised it to species status as Diuris parvipetalum. The specific epithet (parvipetala) is derived from the Latin words parvus meaning "small" and petalum meaning "leaf".

== Distribution and habitat ==
Diuris parvipetala grows with grasses and between rocks from about Mount Moffatt in Queensland to Emmaville in New South Wales.

== Conservation ==
Diuris ochroma is classed as "vulnerable" under the Queensland Government Nature Conservation Act 1992.
