= Acacia meiosperma =

Scientific classification
- Kingdom: Plantae
- Clade: Tracheophytes
- Clade: Angiosperms
- Clade: Eudicots
- Clade: Rosids
- Order: Fabales
- Family: Fabaceae
- Subfamily: Caesalpinioideae
- Clade: Mimosoid clade
- Genus: Acacia
- Species: A. meiosperma

Binomial name
- Acacia meiosperma Pedley
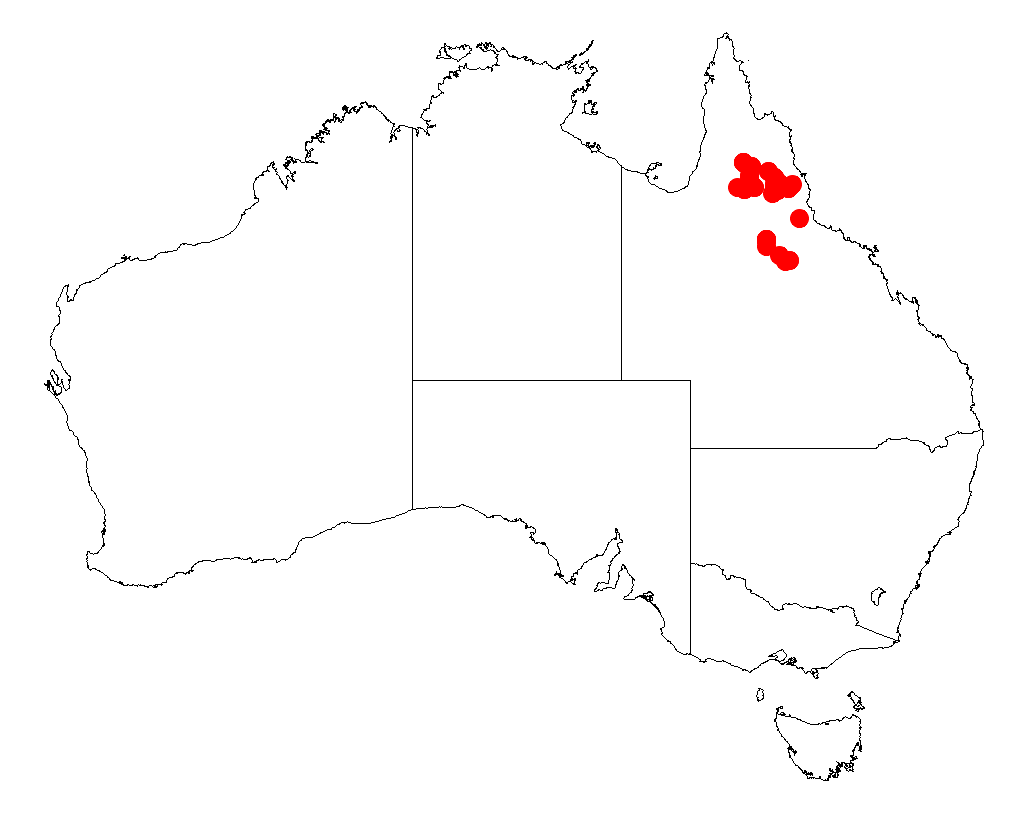
- Occurrence data from AVH

Synonyms
- Acacia sp. 'Lappa, Sandy Tate River' (L.J.Brass 1745); Racosperma meiospermum Pedley

Species of legume

Acacia meiosperma is a species of flowering plant in the family Fabaceae and is endemic to North Queensland, Australia. It is a shrub or tree, usually with glabrous branchlets, narrowly elliptic phyllodes, spikes of golden yellow flowers, and flattened, linear pods.

== Description ==
Acacia meiosperma is shrub or tree that typically grows to a height of up to 2–3 m (6 ft 7 in – 9 ft 10 in) and is covered with soft hairs when young. Its branchlets are usually glabrous, angular and resinous at the end. The phyllodes are narrowly elliptic, straight or slightly sickle-shaped, 65–125 mm (2.6–4.9 in) long, 20–30 mm (0.79–1.18 in) wide and usually glabrous with many close, parallel veins, three to five more prominent than the rest. The flowers are golden yellow and borne in up to four spikes in axils in short racemes 0.5–10 mm (0.020–0.394 in) long on peduncles 3–5 mm (0.12–0.20 in) long, the spikes 15–35 mm (0.59–1.38 in) long. Flowering has been recorded in September, October , from January to April and in June. The pods are flattened linear, up to 80 mm (3.1 in) long, 3 mm (0.12 in) wide, leathery and glabrous. The seeds are oblong, 3–4 mm (0.12–0.16 in) long and glossy dark brown but with a yellow centre and a folded, creamy white axil.

== Taxonomy ==
In 1987, Leslie Pedley described Racosperma meiospermum in the journal Austrobaileya from specimens collected by Leonard John Brass near the Sandy Tate River in 1928, but in 1990, transferred the species to Acacia as A. meiosperma.

== Distribution and habitat ==
This species of wattle is restricted to a small area area in north Queensland about 40 km (25 mi) south east of Chillagoe where it is found in pure stands, growing on plains and slopes in shallow stony soils.

== Conservation status ==
Acacia meiosperma is listed as 'least concern' under the Queensland Government Nature Conservation Act 1992.

== See also ==
- List of Acacia species
