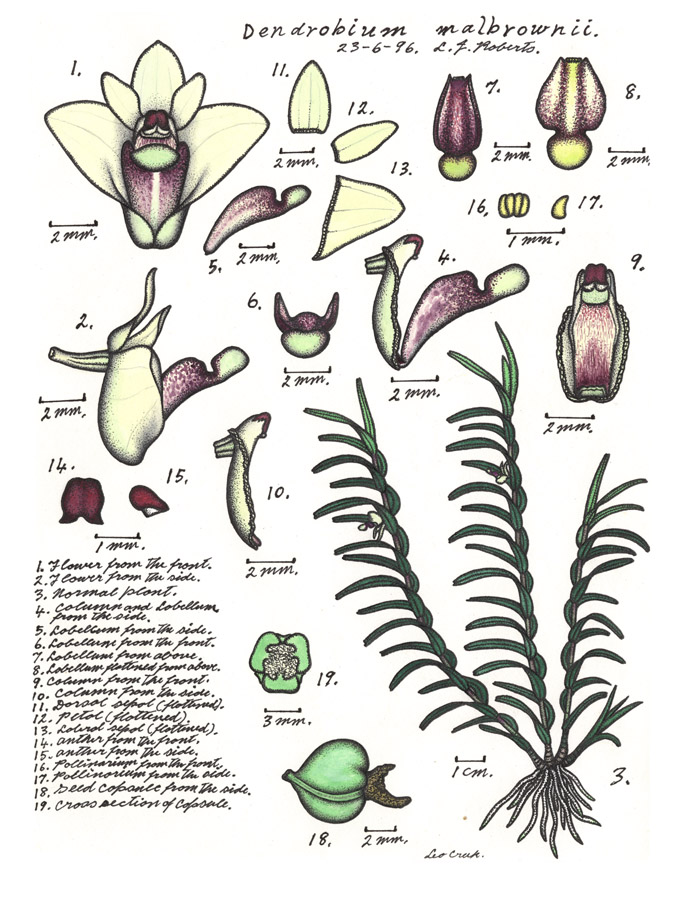
- Illustration by Lewis Roberts

Scientific classification
- Kingdom: Plantae
- Clade: Tracheophytes
- Clade: Angiosperms
- Clade: Monocots
- Order: Asparagales
- Family: Orchidaceae
- Subfamily: Epidendroideae
- Genus: Dendrobium
- Species: D. malbrownii

Binomial name
- Dendrobium malbrownii Dockrill

Synonyms
- Monanthos malbrownii (Dockrill) Rauschert

= Dendrobium malbrownii =

McIlwraith hermit orchid

Species of orchid

Dendrobium malbrownii, commonly known as McIlwraith hermit orchid, is an epiphytic or lithophytic orchid in the family Orchidaceae and is endemic to tropical North Queensland, Australia. It has thin, wiry, crowded stems each with narrow, dark green leaves and a single shiny, cream-coloured flower with a purple labellum. It grows on trees, fallen logs and rocks in rainforest on the McIlwraith Range.

== Description ==
Dendrobium malbrownii is an epiphytic or lithophytic herb with crowded, wiry stems 100–300 mm (4–10 in) long and about 1 mm (0.04 in) wide. The leaves are linear, 30–60 mm (1.2–2.4 in) long, about 4 mm (0.16 in) wide and arranged in two rows along the stems. Each stem has a single cream-coloured flower 6–7 mm (0.24–0.28 in) long and 7–8 mm (0.28–0.31 in) wide. The dorsal sepal is about 3.5 mm (0.14 in) long and 2 mm (0.079 in) wide, the lateral sepals are a similar length but twice as wide and the petals a similar length but only about 1 mm (0.04 in) wide. The labellum is purple and yellow, about 4 mm (0.16 in) long and 2.5 mm (0.098 in) wide with small, rounded side lobes and a middle lobe with two faint ridges. Flowering occurs between December and April.

== Taxonomy and naming ==
Dendrobium malbrownii was first formally described in 1967 by Alick Dockrill in Australian Plants. The specific epithet (malbrownii) honours Malcolm Brown, the collector of the type specimen.

== Distribution and habitat ==
McIlwraith hermit orchid grows on small rocks, logs and trees in rainforest in the McIlwraith Range in tropical North Queensland.
