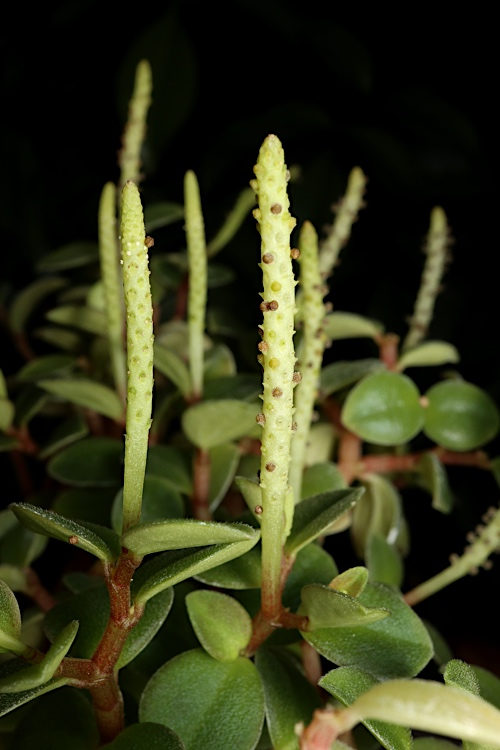
- Flower spikes

Conservation status
- Least Concern (NCA)

Scientific classification
- Kingdom: Plantae
- Clade: Tracheophytes
- Clade: Angiosperms
- Clade: Magnoliids
- Order: Piperales
- Family: Piperaceae
- Genus: Peperomia
- Species: P. bellendenkerensis

Binomial name
- Peperomia bellendenkerensis Domin

= Peperomia bellendenkerensis =

Species of flowering plant

Peperomia bellendenkerensis is a plant in the pepper family Piperaceae found only in the Wet Tropics bioregion of Queensland, Australia.

== Description ==
Peperomia bellendenkerensis is a small succulent herb growing up to 15 cm (5.9 in) tall, and the stems may be erect or decumbent. The leaves are alternate, glabrous, three-veined, and measure up to 35 mm (1.4 in) long and 22 mm (0.87 in) wide.

== Taxonomy ==
This species was described and published by the Czech botanist Karel Domin in 1921, based on material collected by himself in 1909 from the area around Mount Bellenden Ker.

== Conservation ==
This species is listed by the Queensland Government's Department of Environment, Science and Innovation as least concern. As of 13 April 2024, it has not been assessed by the International Union for Conservation of Nature (IUCN).

== Gallery ==
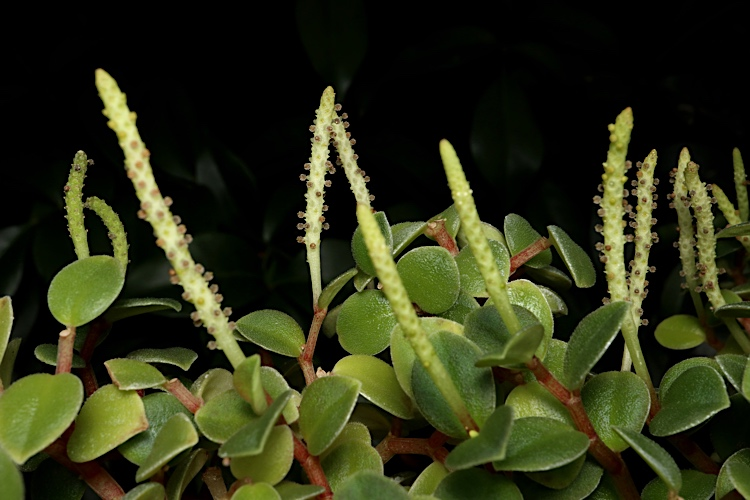

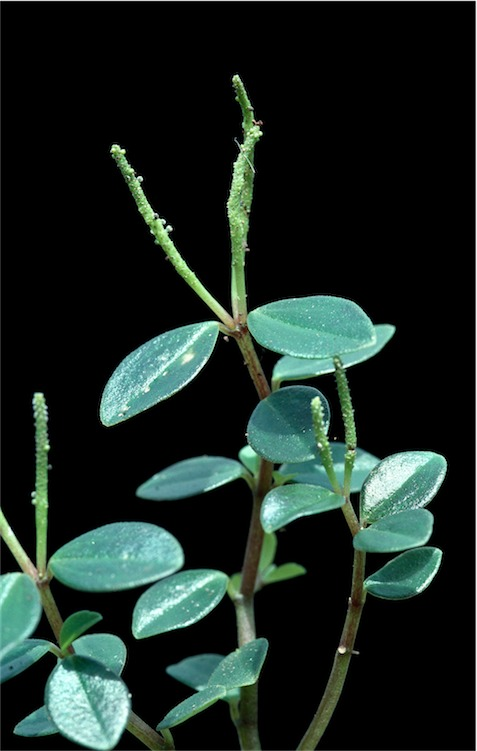

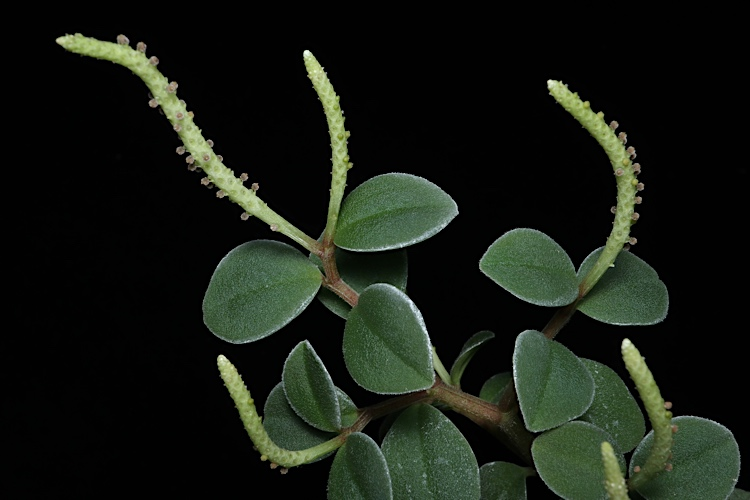

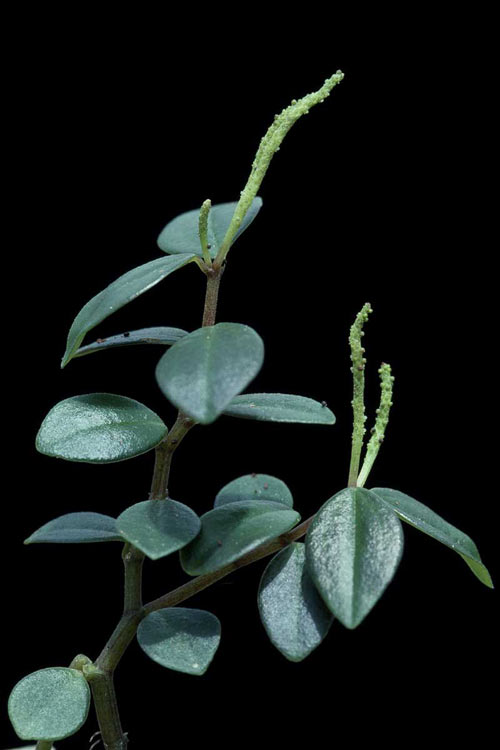
