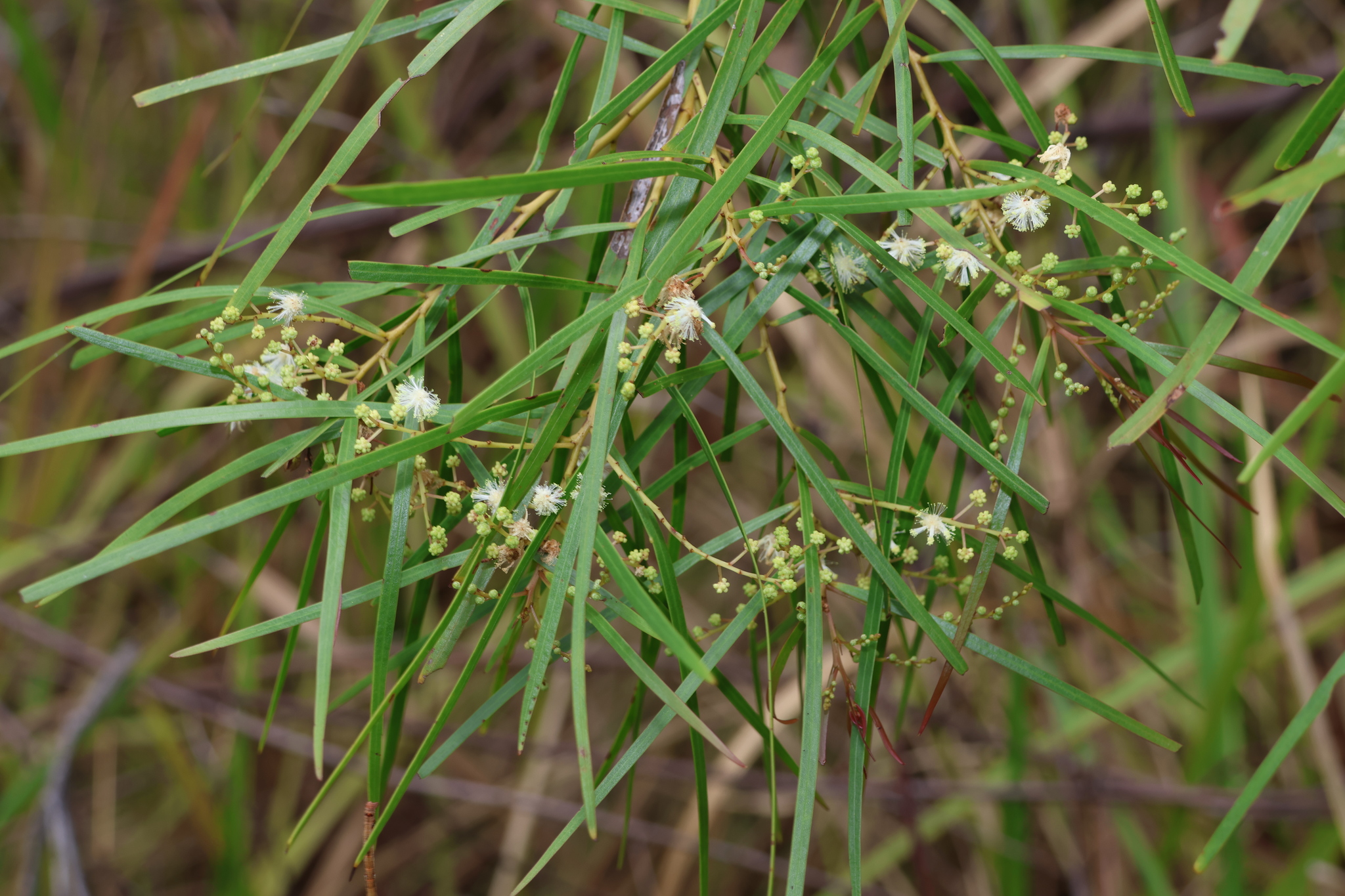
- Near Palen Creek

Conservation status
- Near Threatened (NCA)

Scientific classification
- Kingdom: Plantae
- Clade: Tracheophytes
- Clade: Angiosperms
- Clade: Eudicots
- Clade: Rosids
- Order: Fabales
- Family: Fabaceae
- Subfamily: Caesalpinioideae
- Clade: Mimosoid clade
- Genus: Acacia
- Species: A. acrionastes

Binomial name
- Acacia acrionastes Pedley
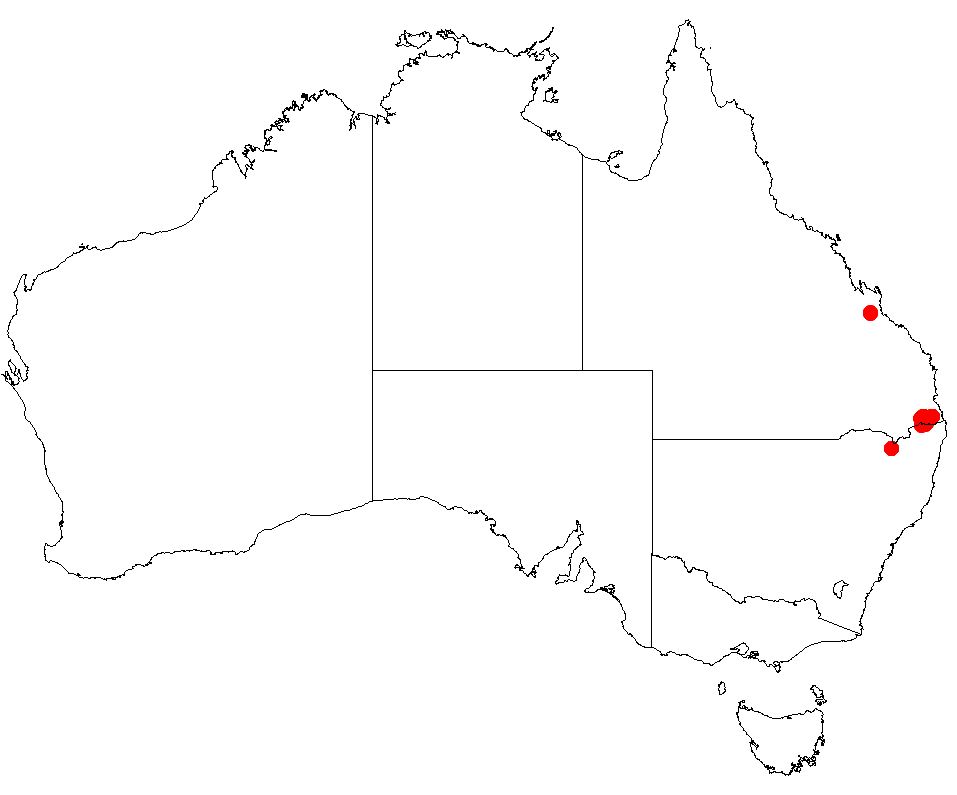
- Occurrence data from AVH

Synonyms
- Racosperma acrionastes (Pedley) Pedley; Acacia adunca auct. non A.Cunn. ex G.Don: Pedley, L.

= Acacia acrionastes =

Species of legume

Acacia acrionastes is a species of flowering plant in the family Fabaceae and is endemic to eastern Australia. It is a spindly, glabrous shrub or tree with linear phyllodes, flowers arranged in a racemes with 10 to 15 spherical heads of flowers, each with 12 to 16 creamy yellow flowers, and leathery pods up to 10 mm (0.39 in) long.

== Description ==
Acacia acrionastes is a spindly, glabrous shrub or tree that typically grows to a height of 2–8 m (6 ft 7 in – 26 ft 3 in). It has linear phyllodes that are 60–190 mm (2.4–7.5 in) long and 2–5 mm (0.079–0.197 in) wide and often narrower towards the tip. The flowers are arranged in a raceme 20–45 mm (0.79–1.77 in) long with 10 to 16 heads on a peduncle 3–6 mm (0.12–0.24 in) long, each head with 12 to 16 creamy yellow flowers. Flowering mainly occurs between July and August and the fruit is a leathery pod up to 100 mm (3.9 in) long and 8–10 mm (0.31–0.39 in) wide, containing up to nine seeds with a shiny black, club-shaped aril.

== Taxonomy ==
The species was first formally described by the botanist Leslie Pedley in 1990 in the journal Austrobaileya from specimens collected on the lower slopes of Mount Maroon in 1986. The specific epithet (acrionastes) means "hilltop-occupant".

== Distribution and habitat ==
Acacia acrionastes grows in shallow, rocky soils and among rocks on mountain peaks and is found in north western New South Wales where it is considered rare and Queensland where it is more common.

== Conservation status ==
Acacia acrionastes is listed as "near threatened" under the Queensland Nature Conservation Act 1992. It is not listed under the Australian Environment Protection and Biodiversity Conservation Act 1999.

== See also ==
- List of Acacia species
