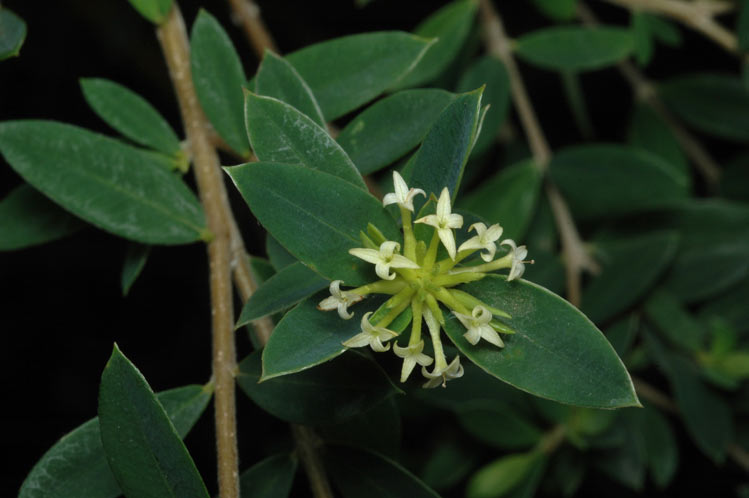
- In Main Range National Park

Scientific classification
- Kingdom: Plantae
- Clade: Tracheophytes
- Clade: Angiosperms
- Clade: Eudicots
- Clade: Rosids
- Order: Malvales
- Family: Thymelaeaceae
- Genus: Pimelea
- Species: P. umbratica

Binomial name
- Pimelea umbratica A.Cunn. ex Meisn.

= Pimelea umbratica =

Species of plant

Pimelea umbratica, is a species of flowering plant in the family Thymelaeaceae and is endemic to eastern Australia. It is a shrub with densely hairy young stems, narrowly elliptic or more or less oblong leaves, and white flowers arranged singly, or in small groups, in leaf axils.

== Description ==
Pimelea umbratica is a shrub that typically grows to a height of 0.6–1.5 m (2 ft 0 in – 4 ft 11 in), is densely branched, and has its young stems densely covered with soft, brownish hairs. The leaves are usually arranged alternately along the stems, narrowly elliptic or more or less oblong, 3–26 mm (0.12–1.02 in) long and 1.5–8 mm (0.059–0.315 in) wide on a short petiole. The flowers are white, 12–14 mm (0.47–0.55 in) long, arranged singly or in small groups on the ends of branches or in leaf axils, and are bisexual or female. The floral tube is 5.0–7.5 mm (0.20–0.30 in) long, the sepals 2.0–2.5 mm (0.079–0.098 in) long. Flowering mainly occurs from April to July and the fruit is about 3 mm (0.12 in) long.

== Taxonomy and naming ==
Pimelea umbratica was first formally described in 1857 by Carl Meissner in de Candolle's Prodromus Systematis Naturalis Regni Vegetabilis from an unpublished description by Allan Cunningham of plants he collected near Moreton Bay. The specific epithet (umbratica) means "living in shade".

== Distribution and habitat ==
This pimelea grows in shrubland above rainforest on rocky slopes or ridges, from the ranges north-east of Warwick in south-eastern Queensland to the Tweed Range in north-eastern New South Wales.
