= Syzygium macilwraithianum =

Conservation status
- Vulnerable (NCA)

Scientific classification
- Kingdom: Plantae
- Clade: Tracheophytes
- Clade: Angiosperms
- Clade: Eudicots
- Clade: Rosids
- Order: Myrtales
- Family: Myrtaceae
- Genus: Syzygium
- Species: S. macilwraithianum

Binomial name
- Syzygium macilwraithianum B.Hyland, 1983

Species of flowering plant

Syzygium macilwraithianum, known commonly as the Macilwraith satinash or Macilwraith Range bark in the wood, is a species of flowering plant in the family Myrtaceae that is endemic to Queensland in Australia.

== Habitat & distribution ==
The species is endemic to seasonal rainforests within Macilwraith Range, located in the Cape York Peninsula in North Queensland. It is restricted to an area within a 45 kilometre radius situated northeast of the town of Coen.

== Description ==
This species grows as a tree to a height of 30 metres. The species has a perennial life cycle and is hermaphroditic. The flowering time of this species is from July to September and the fruiting time is from September to December. The fruit is fleshy, indehiscent, baccate and/or drupaceous. The leaves are 105 millimetres long and 45 millimetres wide. The species is evergreen.

== Conservation ==
Under the Nature Conservation Act 1992 in Queensland it has been classified as vulnerable.
