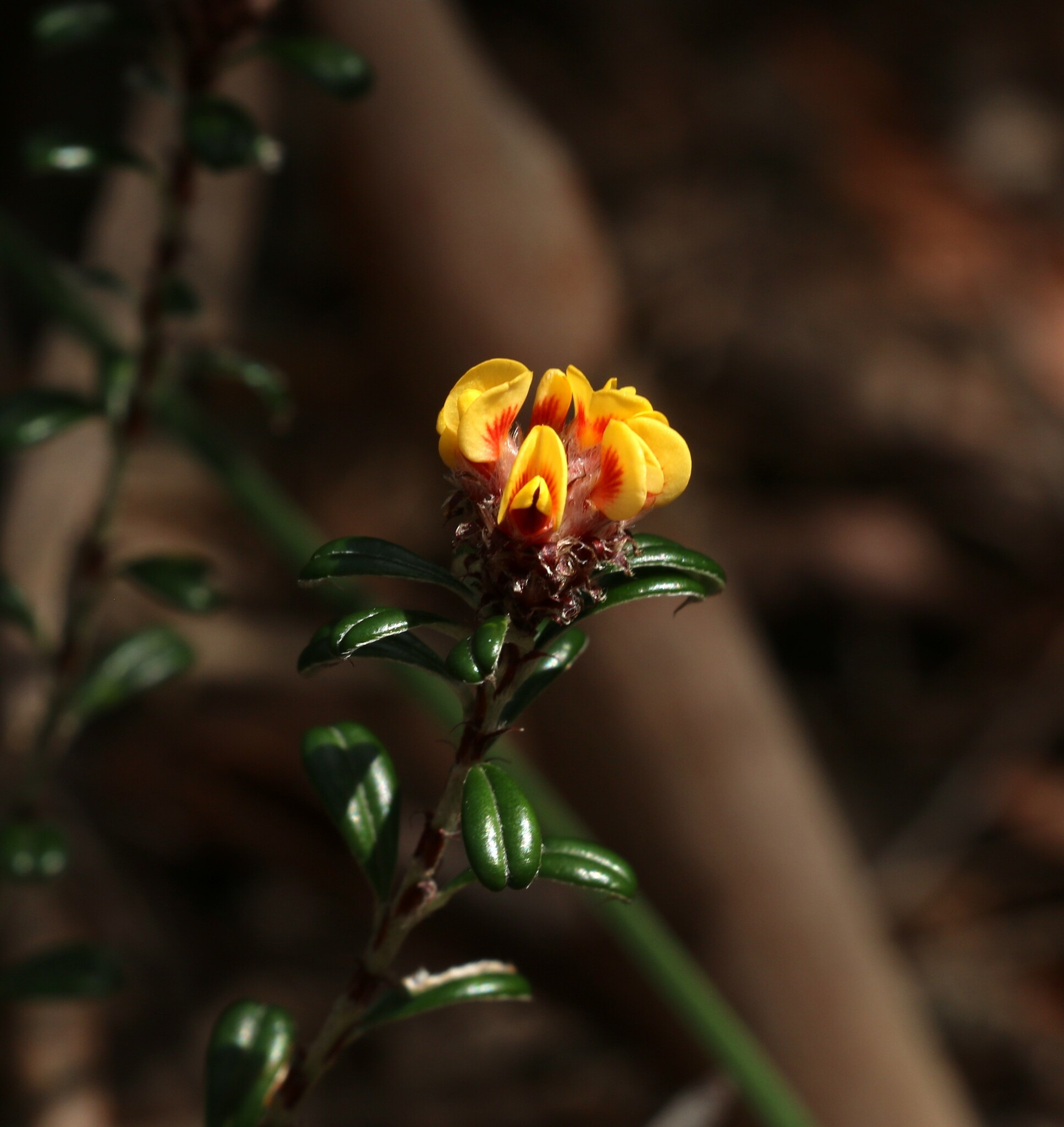

Scientific classification
- Kingdom: Plantae
- Clade: Tracheophytes
- Clade: Angiosperms
- Clade: Eudicots
- Clade: Rosids
- Order: Fabales
- Family: Fabaceae
- Subfamily: Faboideae
- Genus: Pultenaea
- Species: P. pycnocephala

Binomial name
- Pultenaea pycnocephala F.Muell. ex Benth.

= Pultenaea pycnocephala =

Dense-head bush-pea

Species of legume

Pultenaea pycnocephala, commonly known as dense-head bush-pea, is a species of flowering plant in the family Fabaceae and is endemic to eastern Australia. It is an erect shrub with hairy branches, egg-shaped leaves with the narrower end towards the base and yellow to red and purple, pea-like flowers.

== Description ==
Pultenaea pycnocephala is an erect shrub that typically grows to a height of 0.2–1 m (7.9 in – 3 ft 3.4 in) and has branchlets densely covered with hairs pressed against the surface. The leaves are arranged alternately, egg-shaped with the narrower end towards the base, mostly 6.2–15.8 mm (0.24–0.62 in) long, 3.0–6.5 mm (0.12–0.26 in) wide with stipules 3–6 mm (0.12–0.24 in) long at the base. The flowers are arranged in dense clusters, surrounded by velvety, three-lobed bracts 3–8 mm (0.12–0.31 in) long at the base. The flowers are about 10 mm (0.39 in) long and the sepals are about 7 mm (0.28 in) long, joined at the base, with boat-shaped bracteoles 5.5–6.8 mm (0.22–0.27 in) long attached at the base of the sepal tube. The standard petal is yellow to red and 7.2–9.5 mm (0.28–0.37 in) long, the wings are yellow to orange 7.5–8.2 mm (0.30–0.32 in) long, and the keel is red to purple and 6.5–8.0 mm (0.26–0.31 in) long. Flowering mainly occurs in October and the fruit is a flattened pod 6–7 mm (0.24–0.28 in) long.

== Taxonomy ==
Pultenaea pycnocephala was first formally described in 1864 by George Bentham in Flora Australiensis from an unpublished description by Ferdinand von Mueller. The specific epithet (pycnocephala) means "dense-headed".

== Distribution and habitat ==
Dense-headed bush-pea grows in forest, woodland and swampy places and is found south from Moreton Bay in south-east Queensland to the Gibraltar Range and Werrikimbe National Parks in northern New South Wales.
