= Goodenia stirlingii =

Scientific classification
- Kingdom: Plantae
- Clade: Tracheophytes
- Clade: Angiosperms
- Clade: Eudicots
- Clade: Asterids
- Order: Asterales
- Family: Goodeniaceae
- Genus: Goodenia
- Species: G. stirlingii

Binomial name
- Goodenia stirlingii F.M.Bailey

Species of plant

Goodenia stephensonii is a species of flowering plant in the family Goodeniaceae and is endemic to north-eastern Queensland. It is an erect undershrub with narrow elliptic leaves and racemes of yellow flowers.

== Description ==
Goodenia stirlingii is an erect undershrub that typically grows to a height of up to 30 cm (12 in) and has glabrous foliage. The leaves are sessile, narrow elliptic, 20–40 mm (0.79–1.57 in) long and 5–15 mm (0.20–0.59 in) wide, with toothed edges. The flowers are arranged in racemes up to 100 mm (3.9 in) long on a peduncle up to 5 mm (0.20 in) long with leaf-like bracts and linear bracteoles about 5 mm (0.20 in) long. The sepals are lance-shaped, 7–8 mm (0.28–0.31 in) long, the corolla yellow and about 22 mm (0.87 in) long. The lower lobes of the corolla are 6–8 mm (0.24–0.31 in) long with wings 1–1.5 mm (0.039–0.059 in) wide. Flowering mainly occurs from March to July.

== Taxonomy and naming ==
Goodenia stirlingii was first formally described in 1904 by Frederick Manson Bailey in the Queensland Agricultural Journal from specimens collected by Dr. James Stirling near Herberton.

== Distribution ==
This goodenia occurs in north-eastern Queensland.
