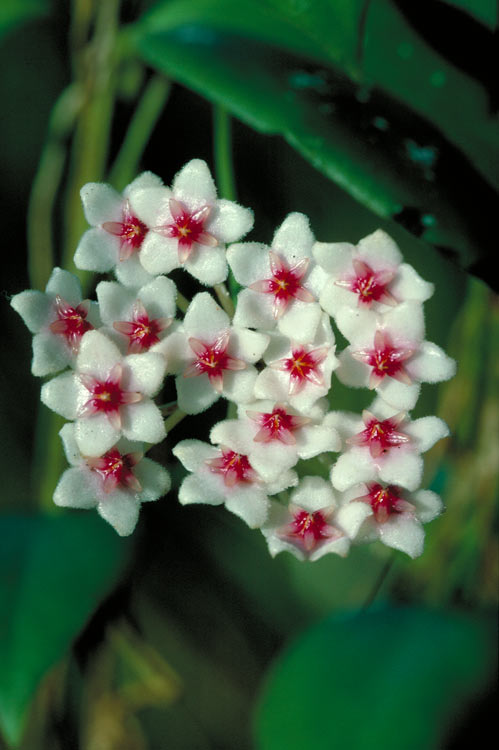

Conservation status
- Near Threatened (NCA)

Scientific classification
- Kingdom: Plantae
- Clade: Tracheophytes
- Clade: Angiosperms
- Clade: Eudicots
- Clade: Asterids
- Order: Gentianales
- Family: Apocynaceae
- Genus: Hoya
- Species: H. anulata

Binomial name
- Hoya anulata Schltr.

Synonyms
- Hoya alata K.D.Hill; Hoya pseudolittoralis C.Norman; Hoya gracilipes auct. non Schltr.: Jones, D.L. & Gray, B. (1988); Hoya gracilipes auct. non Schltr.: Thomas, M.B. & McDonald, W.J.F. (1989)

= Hoya anulata =

Species of plant

Hoya anulata is a species of flowering plant in the Apocynaceae or dogbane family and is endemic to Cape York and parts of Southeast Asia. It is a epiphytic or lithophytic vine with fleshy, egg-shaped leaves, fleshy pale pink and white flowers, and spindle-shaped follicles.

== Description ==
Hoya anulata is a vine that reaches up to 3 m (9.8 ft) long and has fleshy, egg-shaped leaves, sometimes with the narrower end towards the base, 30–95 mm (1.2–3.7 in) long and 20–50 mm (0.79–1.97 in) wide, on a petiole 2–12 mm (0.079–0.472 in) long. The flowers are arranged in umbels 12–13 mm (0.47–0.51 in) in diameter of about 14 flowers on a peduncle about 70 mm (2.8 in) long, each flower on a pedicel 16–18 mm (0.63–0.71 in) long. The petals are wheel shaped, fleshy pale pink to white with triangular lobes 4–5 mm (0.16–0.20 in) long and about 5 mm (0.20 in) wide. The corona is pale pink and oblong with lobes about 3 mm (0.12 in) long and 1.0–1.5 mm (0.039–0.059 in) wide. Flowering has been observed in February, April and July, and the fruit is a spindle-shaped follicle 14 mm (0.55 in) long and 70–140 mm (2.8–5.5 in) long.

== Taxonomy ==
Hoya anulata was first formally described in 1905 by Rudolf Schlechter in the Journal of the Linnean Society, Botany, from specimens he collected in 1902 on the upper Nuru River at altitudes of about 400 m (1,300 ft) .

== Distribution and habitat ==
This species of Hoya grows as an epiphyte or lithophyte in rainforest and vine forest on Cape York, in Papuasia and on the Maluku Islands in Indonesia.

== Conservation status ==
Hoya anulata is listed as "near threatened" under the Queensland Government Nature Conservation Act 1992.
