= Calytrix islensis =

Conservation status
- Vulnerable (NCA)

Scientific classification
- Kingdom: Plantae
- Clade: Tracheophytes
- Clade: Angiosperms
- Clade: Eudicots
- Clade: Rosids
- Order: Myrtales
- Family: Myrtaceae
- Genus: Calytrix
- Species: C. islensis

Binomial name
- Calytrix islensis Craven

Species of flowering plant

Calytrix islensis is a species of flowering plant in the myrtle family Myrtaceae and is endemic to a restricted area of Queensland. It is a mostly glabrous shrub with elliptic to egg-shaped leaves with the narrower end towards the base, white flowers with a yellow base, and about 65 to 70 yellow stamens in several rows.

== Description ==
Calytrix islensis is a mostly glabrous shrub that typically grows to a height of up to 2 m (6 ft 7 in). Its leaves are elliptic to egg-shaped with the narrower end towards the base, 2.0–3.5 mm (0.079–0.138 in) long, 1.0–1.2 mm (0.039–0.047 in) wide and sessile or on a petiole up to 0.5 mm (0.020 in) long. There are stipules up to 0.2 mm (0.0079 in) long at the base of the petiole. The flowers are borne in clusters on a peduncle 8–9 mm (0.31–0.35 in) long with egg-shaped lobes 6–7 mm (0.24–0.28 in) long. The floral tube is mostly free from the style, 8–10 mm (0.31–0.39 in) and has 10 ribs. The sepals are fused at the base, with more or less round lobes 2.5–3.0 mm (0.098–0.118 in) long and 2.8–3.5 mm (0.11–0.14 in) long, with an awn long up to 11 mm (0.43 in) long. The petals are white with a yellow base, elliptic to lance-shaped, 6.5–8 mm (0.26–0.31 in) long and 3–4 mm (0.12–0.16 in) wide, and there are about 65 to 70 yellow stamens in two or three rows. Flowering occurs in September and October.

== Taxonomy ==
Calytrix islensis was first formally described in 1987 by Lyndley Craven in the journal Brunonia from specimens collected in Isla Gorge in 1968.

== Distribution and habitat ==
This species of Calytrix grows in woodland on sandstone plateaux, ridges and outcrops in the Expedition, Isla Gorge, and Precipice National Parks in Queensland.

== Conservation status ==
Calytrix islensis is listed as "vulnerable" under the Queensland Government Nature Conservation Act 1992.
