= Acacia armillata =

Conservation status
- Least Concern (IUCN 3.1)

Scientific classification
- Kingdom: Plantae
- Clade: Embryophytes
- Clade: Tracheophytes
- Clade: Spermatophytes
- Clade: Angiosperms
- Clade: Eudicots
- Clade: Rosids
- Order: Fabales
- Family: Fabaceae
- Subfamily: Caesalpinioideae
- Clade: Mimosoid clade
- Genus: Acacia
- Species: A. armillata

Binomial name
- Acacia armillata Pedley
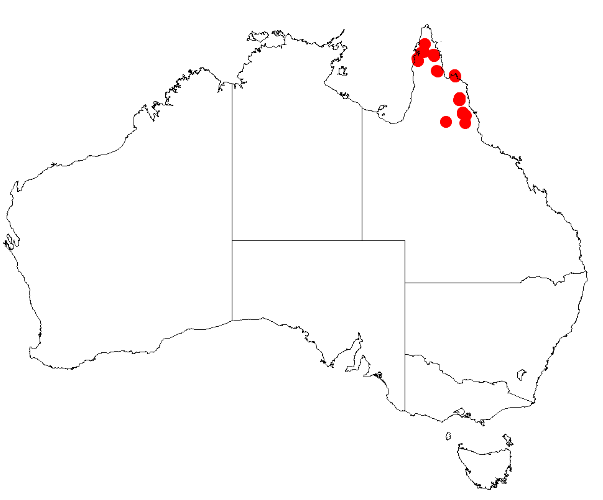
- Occurrence data from AVH

Synonyms
- Acacia sp. 'Lakeland Downs' (J.R.Clarkson 6291); Racosperma armillatum Pedley

Species of legume

Acacia armillata is a species of flowering plant in the family Fabaceae and is endemic to north Queensland. It is a tree with rough bark at the base of the trunk, narrowly elliptic to lance-shaped phyllodes, pale yellow flowers arranged in head of 20 to 30, and thin, leathery pods up to 100 mm (3.9 in) long.

== Description ==
Acacia armillata is a tree that typically grows to a height of up to 8 m (26 ft) and has pendulous branches. It has rough grey bark at the base of the trunk, smooth and more mottled above. Its phyllodes are mostly narrowly elliptic to lance-shaped, straight to slightly curved, mostly 75–150 mm (3.0–5.9 in) long and 5–20 mm (0.20–0.79 in) wide. The phyllodes are thinly leathery, glabrous with a gland 1–2 mm (0.039–0.079 in) from the base. The flowers are borne in one or two spherical heads in axils on peduncles 3–12 mm (0.12–0.47 in) long. The heads are spherical, 3.5–4.0 mm (0.14–0.16 in) long with 20 to 30 pale yellow flowers. Flowering occurs from about December to March and the pods are up to 100 mm (3.9 in) long and 6–11 mm (0.24–0.43 in) wide and constricted between the seeds. The seeds are oblong, dark brown, about 5 mm (0.20 in) long and 3 mm (0.12 in) wide.

== Taxonomy ==
This species was first formally described in 1987 by Leslie Pedley who gave it the name Racosperma armillatum in the journal Austrobaileya from specimens collected near Mount Janet, about 11.5 km (7.1 mi) south-west of Lakeland Downs in 1986. In 1990, Pedley transferred to species to Acacia as A. armillata in a later edition of Austrobaileya.

== Distribution and habitat ==
This species of Acacia has a disjunct distribution throughout far north Queensland and is found in three localities separated by great distances from each other on or near the Great Dividing Range on Cape York Peninsula. These are the area around Iron Range Mining, the area around Mount Janet and surrounding the junction of Walsh River and Price Creek where it is usually found as a part of Eucalyptus normantonensis or Eucalyptus cullenii woodland communities.

== Conservation status ==
Acacia armillata is listed as of "least concern" under the Queensland Government Nature Conservation Act 1992.

== See also ==
- List of Acacia species
