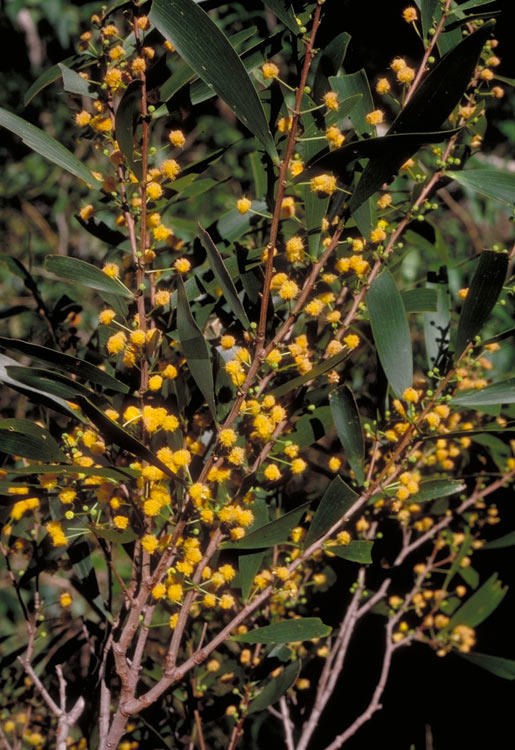

Conservation status
- Vulnerable (NCA)

Scientific classification
- Kingdom: Plantae
- Clade: Embryophytes
- Clade: Tracheophytes
- Clade: Spermatophytes
- Clade: Angiosperms
- Clade: Eudicots
- Clade: Rosids
- Order: Fabales
- Family: Fabaceae
- Subfamily: Caesalpinioideae
- Clade: Mimosoid clade
- Genus: Acacia
- Species: A. hylonoma

Binomial name
- Acacia hylonoma Pedley
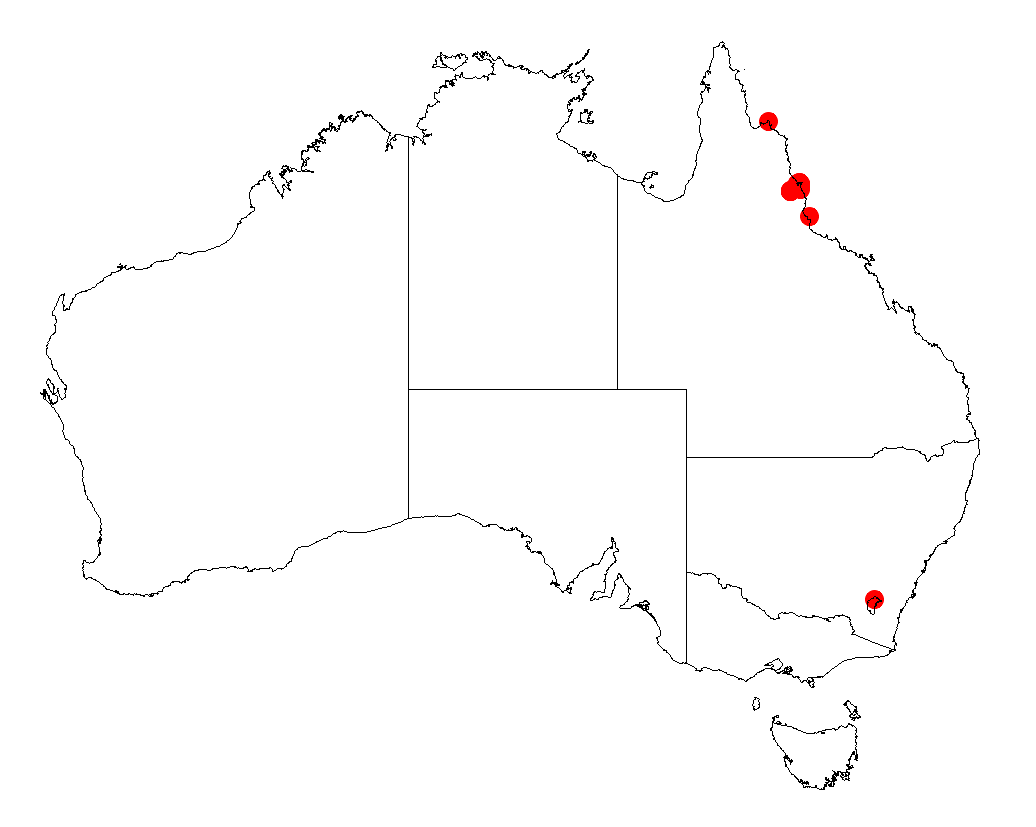
- Occurrence data from AVH

Synonyms
- Racosperma hylonomum (Pedley) Pedley

= Acacia hylonoma =

Species of legume

Acacia hylonoma, commonly known as Yarrabah wattle, is a species of flowering plant in the family Fabaceae and is endemic to north Queensland, Australia. It is a rainforest tree with narrowly elliptic phyllodes, spherical heads of golden yellow flowers and linear, leathery pods raised over the seeds.

== Description ==
Acacia hylonoma is a tree that typically grows to a height of up to 15 m (49 ft), the trunk with a dbh up to 20 cm (7.9 in), its branchlets glabrous and lenticellate. The phyllodes are narrowly elliptic, straight to slightly curved, 80–145 mm (3.1–5.7 in) long, 7–16 mm (0.28–0.63 in) wide, with six to eleven main veins and a gland 3–15 mm (0.12–0.59 in) above the pulvinus. The flowers are borne in up to eight spherical heads in racemes on peduncles 5–15 mm (0.20–0.59 in) long, each head 5.5–6.0 mm (0.22–0.24 in) wide with 25 to 35 golden yellow flowers. The pods are linear, up to 90 mm (3.5 in) long, 12 mm (0.47 in) wide and leathery, raised over, and not, or scarcely constricted between the seeds. The seeds are more or less round, 4.5–5.0 mm (0.18–0.20 in) long and 3.5–4.0 mm (0.14–0.16 in) wide and dull brown with a narrowly club-shaped aril.

== Taxonomy ==
Acacia hylonoma was first formally described in 1978 by Leslie Pedley in the journal Austrobaileya from specimens collected at Yarrabah in 1972.

=== Etymology ===
The first use of hylonoma as a specific epithet was in 1916 for Salix hylonoma, where the epithet is described as being derived from the Greek, hylonomos, and means "living in woods".

== Distribution and habitat ==
Yarrabah wattle grows in rainforest and is restricted to the area near where the type specimens were collected in northern Queensland, just south east of Cairns, at altitudes up to 400 m (1,300 ft).

== Conservation status ==
Acacia hylonoma is listed as "vulnerable" under the Queensland Government Nature Conservation Act 1992.

== See also ==
- List of Acacia species
