= Hibbertia cymosa =

Conservation status
- Vulnerable (NCA)

Scientific classification
- Kingdom: Plantae
- Clade: Tracheophytes
- Clade: Angiosperms
- Clade: Eudicots
- Order: Dilleniales
- Family: Dilleniaceae
- Genus: Hibbertia
- Species: H. cymosa

Binomial name
- Hibbertia cymosa S.T.Reynolds

Species of flowering plant

Hibbertia cymosa is a species of flowering plant in the family Dilleniaceae and is endemic to a restricted area of Queensland. It is a shrub with densely hairy foliage, elliptic leaves, and yellow flowers, each with fifty to eighty stamens arranged in bundles around three carpels.

== Description ==
Hibbertia cymosa is a shrub that typically grows to a height of up to 1.4 m (4 ft 7 in), its branches and leaves densely covered with star-shaped and long white hairs. The leaves are elliptic, 40–53 mm (1.6–2.1 in) long and 12–15 mm (0.47–0.59 in) wide on a petiole 1.6–2.8 mm (0.063–0.110 in) long. The flowers are borne singly, in pairs or threes in leaf axils on a thin peduncle 6.5–2.5 mm (0.256–0.098 in) long, with egg-shaped bracts 1.5–2 mm (0.059–0.079 in) long. The two outer sepal lobes are 2.6–3.8 mm (0.10–0.15 in) long and the three inner ones are 4.7–5.6 mm (0.19–0.22 in) long. The five petals are egg-shaped with the narrower end towards the base, yellow, 7–8 mm (0.28–0.31 in) long and there are fifty to eighty stamens arranged around the three carpels, each carpel with two ovules. Flowering occurs around June.

== Taxonomy ==
Hibbertia cymosa was first formally described in 1991 by Sally T. Reynolds in the journal Austrobaileya from specimens collected by Anthony Bean near Jowalbinna (near Laura) in 1990. The specific epithet (cymosa) refers to the cymose arrangement of the flowers.

== Distribution and habitat ==
This hibbertia is only known from the type location where the species grows near a creek.

== Conservation status ==
Goodenia cymosa is classified as "vulnerable" under the Queensland Government Nature Conservation Act 1992.

== See also ==
- List of Hibbertia species
