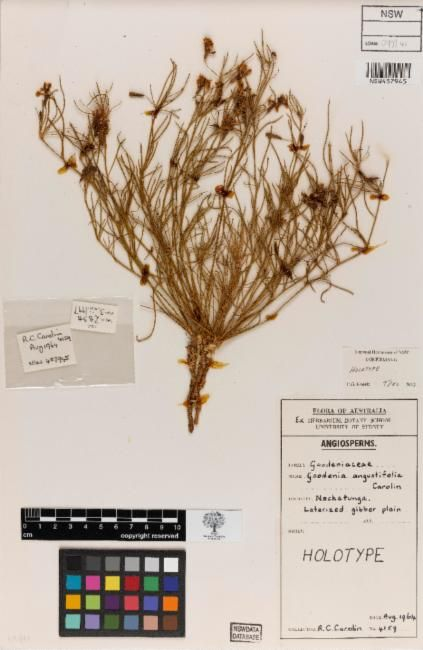
- specimen NSW457945, collected Nockatunga, QLD (image from National Herbarium of New South Wales)

Scientific classification
- Kingdom: Plantae
- Clade: Tracheophytes
- Clade: Angiosperms
- Clade: Eudicots
- Clade: Asterids
- Order: Asterales
- Family: Goodeniaceae
- Genus: Goodenia
- Species: G. angustifolia

Binomial name
- Goodenia angustifolia Carolin

= Goodenia angustifolia =

Species of plant

Goodenia angustifolia is a species of flowering plant in the family Goodeniaceae and is endemic to northern Australia. It is a prostrate or ascending herb with linear, channelled, needle-shaped leaves, and racemes of bright yellow flowers with leaf-like bracteoles at the base.

== Description ==
Goodenia angustifolia is a prostrate or ascending herb with glabrous, glaucous foliage. The leaves are needle-shaped but channelled, 50–80 mm (2.0–3.1 in) long and about 0.5 mm (0.020 in) wide, those on the stem sometimes clustered. The flowers are arranged in racemes up to 100 mm (3.9 in) long on a peduncle 5–10 mm (0.20–0.39 in) long, each flower on a pedicel about 1 mm (0.039 in) long with leaf-like, linear to triangular bracteoles at the base. The sepals are lance-shaped, 2.5–3 mm (0.098–0.118 in) long and the corolla is bright yellow, 10–12 mm (0.39–0.47 in) long and hairy inside. The lower lobes of the corolla are about 6–7 mm (0.24–0.28 in) long with wings about 2 mm (0.079 in) wide. Flowering has been observed in August.

== Taxonomy and naming ==
Goodenia angustifolia was first formally described in 1980 by Roger Charles Carolin in the journal Telopea from material he collected near Nockatunga in 1964. The specific epithet (angustifolia) means "narrow-leaved".

== Distribution and habitat ==
This goodenia grows on stony downs near the type location in Queensland, but has also been recorded along roadsides and in other arid areas of the Northern Territory.
