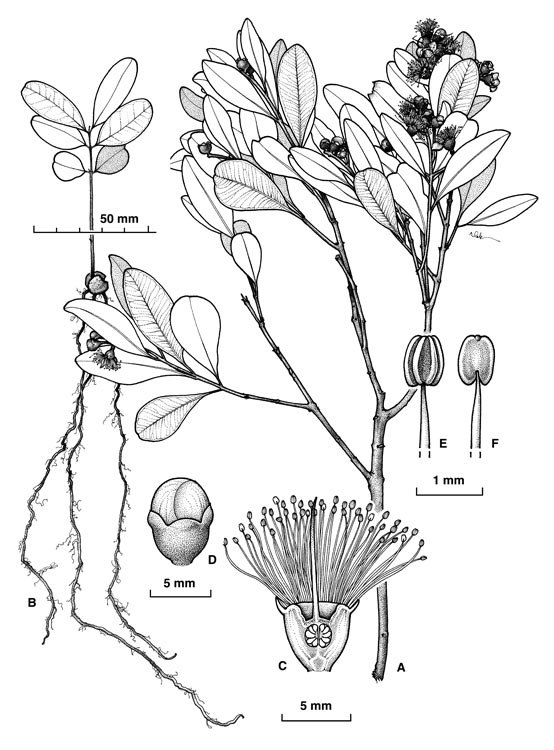
- Botanical sketch

Conservation status
- Least Concern (NCA)

Scientific classification
- Kingdom: Plantae
- Clade: Tracheophytes
- Clade: Angiosperms
- Clade: Eudicots
- Clade: Rosids
- Order: Myrtales
- Family: Myrtaceae
- Genus: Syzygium
- Species: S. argyropedicum

Binomial name
- Syzygium argyropedicum B.Hyland
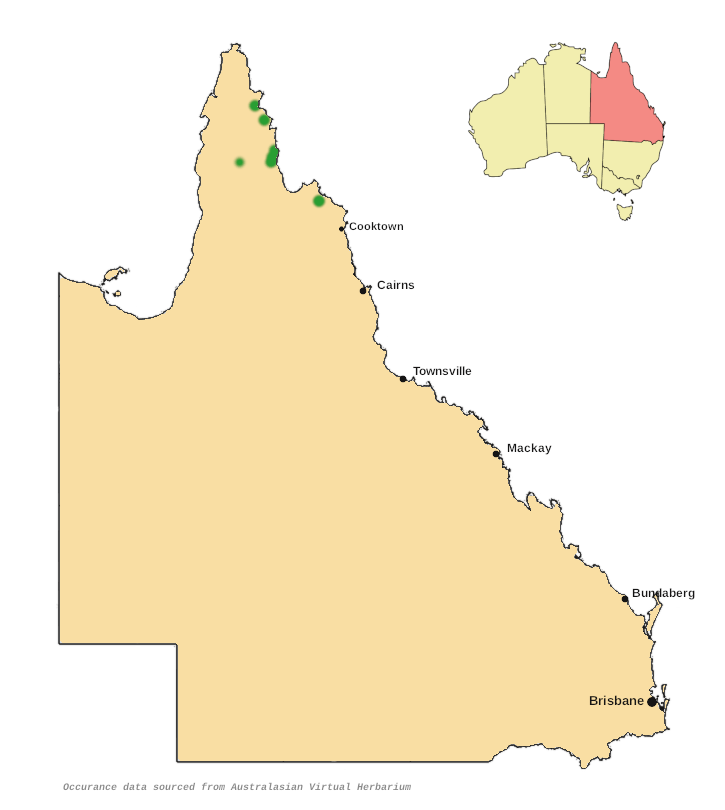

= Syzygium argyropedicum =

Species of flowering plant

Syzygium argyropedicum is a species of tree in the family Myrtaceae. It is endemic to Queensland, Australia.

== Description ==
It grows as a perennial, and can reach heights of up to 24 metres. It flowers in November and December and fruits from January to March. It has bacciferous and/or drupaceous fruit.

== Distribution ==
It is restricted to the east coast of Cape York Peninsula, ranging from Bolt Head in Temple Bay, about 12.2° S, to the Howick River in Cape Melville National Park, about 14.7° S.

== Conservation ==
Under Queensland's Nature Conservation Act it is regarded as least concern.
