= Amomum dallachyi =

Scientific classification
- Kingdom: Plantae
- Clade: Tracheophytes
- Clade: Angiosperms
- Clade: Monocots
- Clade: Commelinids
- Order: Zingiberales
- Family: Zingiberaceae
- Genus: Amomum
- Species: A. dallachyi

Binomial name
- Amomum dallachyi F.Muell.

Species of flowering plant

Amomum dallachyi, commonly known as a green ginger, is a plant in the ginger family that is native to Queensland, Australia.
