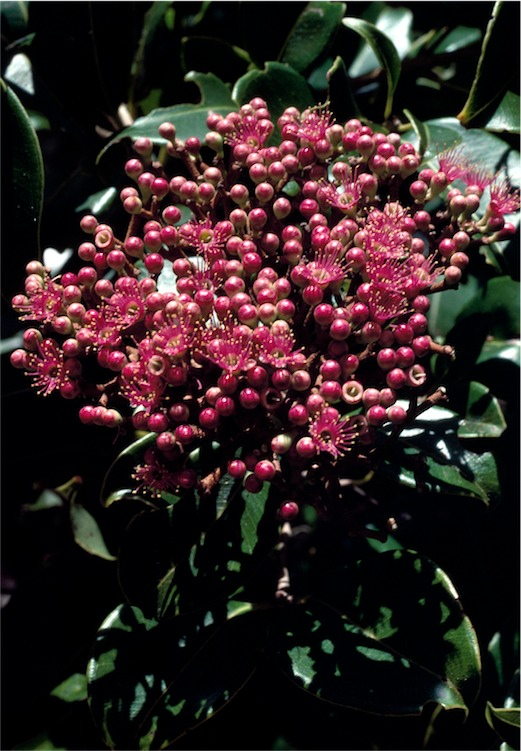
- Flowers of Syzygium buettnerianum

Conservation status
- Least Concern (IUCN 3.1)
- Near Threatened (NCA)

Scientific classification
- Kingdom: Plantae
- Clade: Tracheophytes
- Clade: Angiosperms
- Clade: Eudicots
- Clade: Rosids
- Order: Myrtales
- Family: Myrtaceae
- Genus: Syzygium
- Species: S. buettnerianum

Binomial name
- Syzygium buettnerianum (K.Schum.) Nied.

Synonyms
- Eugenia buettneriana K.Schum.

= Syzygium buettnerianum =

Species of flowering plant

Syzygium buettnerianum, also known as the Cape York satinash or New Guinea satinash, is a species of tree in the myrtle family Myrtaceae. It is native to New Guinea, the Solomon Islands and Santa Cruz Islands, and Vanuatu, as well as in the Torres Strait Islands and Cape York Peninsula of northern Queensland, Australia.

== Description ==
It can grow to be up to 25 metres in height. It flowers from June to December and fruits in February and March. It has fleshy, indehiscent bacciferous and/or drupaceous fruit with simple leaf compoundness.

== Conservation ==
It has been assessed as Near Threatened by the Queensland Government under the Nature Conservation Act 1992.
