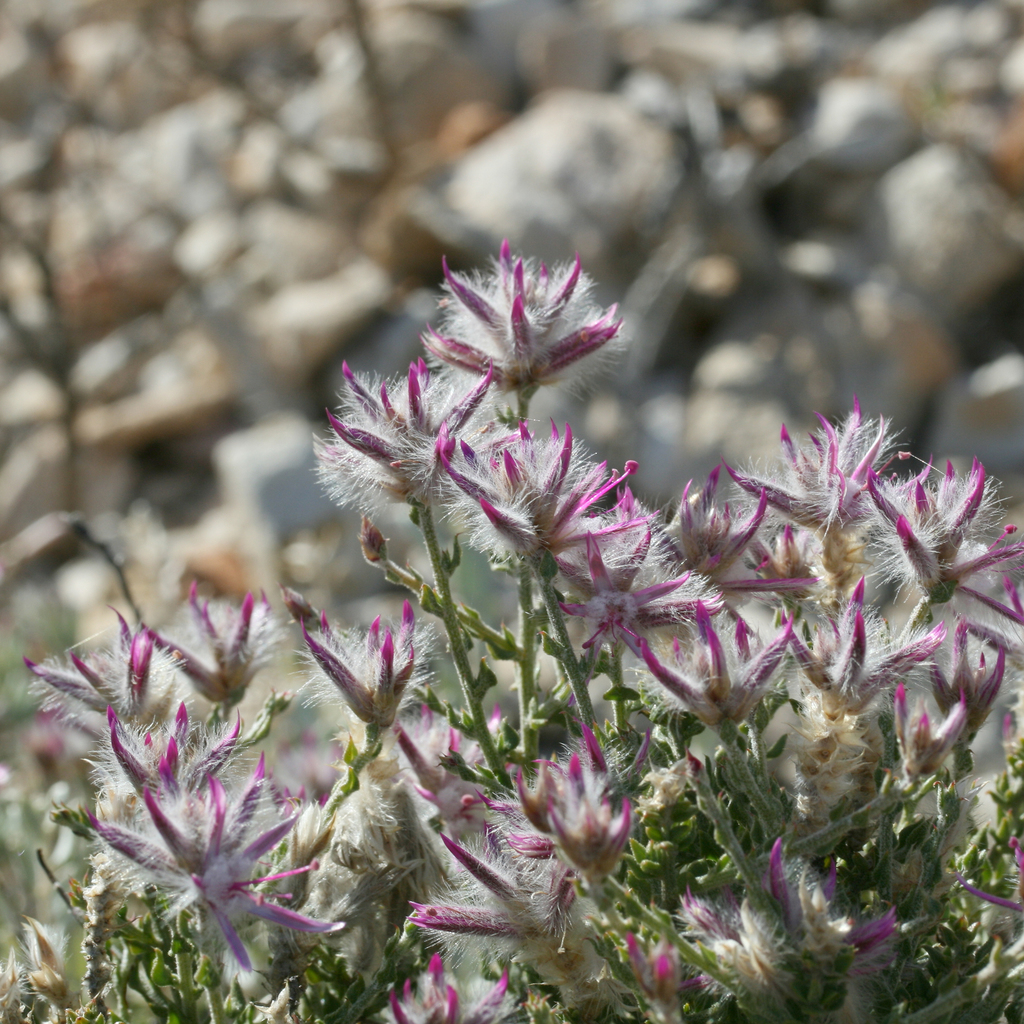
- In Sturt National Park

Conservation status
- Priority One — Poorly Known Taxa (DEC)

Scientific classification
- Kingdom: Plantae
- Clade: Tracheophytes
- Clade: Angiosperms
- Clade: Eudicots
- Order: Caryophyllales
- Family: Amaranthaceae
- Genus: Ptilotus
- Species: P. remotiflorus

Binomial name
- Ptilotus remotiflorus Benl

= Ptilotus remotiflorus =

Species of plant

Ptilotus remotiflorus, commonly known as Cordillo Downs pussy-tail, is a species of flowering plant of the family Amaranthaceae and is endemic to inland Australia. It is an erect, widely branching perennial shrub with egg-shaped or lance-shaped stem leaves and purple to deep pink flowers.

== Description ==
Ptilotus remotiflorus is an erect, widely branching perennial shrub that typically grows to a height of up to about 1 m (3 ft 3 in) with stems covered with soft hairs when young, later glabrous. There egg-shaped or lance-shaped stem leaves up to 18 mm (0.71 in) long and 5 mm (0.20 in) wide. The flowers are borne in hemispherical or short-cylindrical spikes up to 30 mm (1.2 in) long with up to 20 purple to deep pink flowers on the ends of branches. The bracts and bracteoles are 3.0–4.5 mm (0.12–0.18 in) long and glabrous. The perianth segments are 9–11 mm (0.35–0.43 in) long, hairy on the outer surface and glabrous above. There are two stamens and three staminodes, the style is 6–7.5 mm (0.24–0.30 in) long, the ovary is more or less sessile, glabrous and laterally compressed. Flowering mainly occurs from June to November, and the seeds are borne in oval heads.

== Taxonomy ==
Ptilotus remotiflorus was first formally described in 1976 by Gerhard Benl in the journal Mitteilungen der Botanischen Staatssammlung Munchen from specimens collected 62 mi (100 km) west of Winton on the Boulia road in a roadside cutting in 1972. The specific epithet (remotiflorus) means 'remote-flowered'.

== Distribution and habitat ==
This species of Ptilotus grows on loam or clay in hillslpoes, rocky screes and gullies on plains, tablelands and semi-desert areas in the far north-east of South Australia, Queensland and the far north-western plains of New South Wales.

== Conservation status ==
Ptilotus remotiflorus is rare in South Australia, uncommon in New South Wales, but is common in Queensland, where it is listed as of "least concern" under the Queensland Government Nature Conservation Act 1992.
