= Acacia ommatosperma =

Conservation status
- Near Threatened (NCA)

Scientific classification
- Kingdom: Plantae
- Clade: Tracheophytes
- Clade: Angiosperms
- Clade: Eudicots
- Clade: Rosids
- Order: Fabales
- Family: Fabaceae
- Subfamily: Caesalpinioideae
- Clade: Mimosoid clade
- Genus: Acacia
- Species: A. ommatosperma

Binomial name
- Acacia ommatosperma (Pedley) Pedley
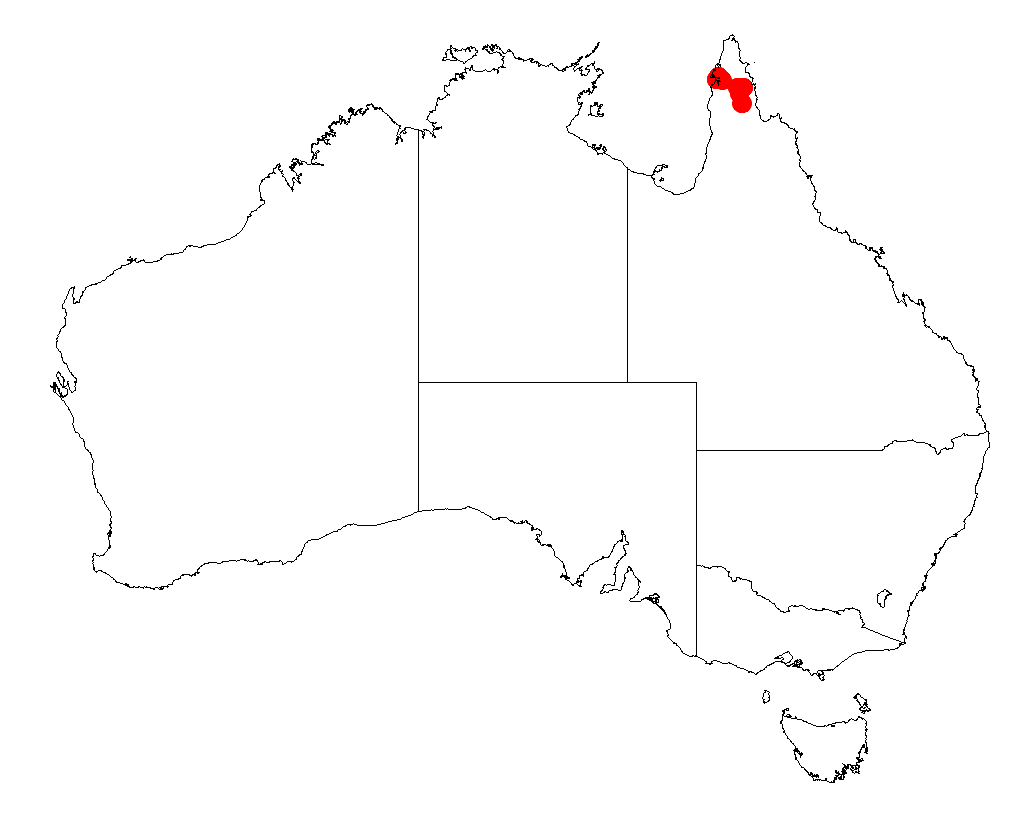
- Occurrence data from AVH

Synonyms
- Acacia sp. 'Weipa' (K.A.Williams 78088); Racosperma ommatospermum Pedley

Species of legume

Acacia ommatosperma is a species of flowering plant in the family Fabaceae, and is endemic to Cape York Peninsula in Queensland, Australia. It is a shrub or small tree with pendulous branches, angular glabrous branchlets that are angular at the end, narrowly oblong, leathery, curved phyllodes, spherical heads of yellow flowers and linear, thinly leathery pods.

== Description ==
Acacia ommatosperma is a shrub or small tree with pendulous branches and glabrous branchlets that are angular near the end. Its phyllodes are narrowly oblong, curved, 95–125 mm (3.7–4.9 in) long, 7–14 mm (0.28–0.55 in) wide, glabrous and leathery with three to five main veins and two or three glands along the upper margin, the lowermost gland up to 2 mm (0.079 in) above the pulvinus. The flowers are borne in one or two spherical heads on peduncles 3–8 mm (0.12–0.31 in) long, one head maturing before the other, each head with 25 to 30 flowers. The pods are linear, up to 100 mm (3.9 in) long, 6–8 mm (0.24–0.31 in) wide, thinly leathery and glabrous, alternately raised over the seeds and scarsely constricted between them. The seeds are almost circular, about 3.5 mm (0.14 in) long and dull dark brown with a narrowly club-shaped aril.

== Taxonomy ==
In 1987, Leslie Pedley described Racosperma ommatospermum in the journal Austrobaileya from specimens collected by Keith Albert Walter Williams, (1916–2003) in the Andoom–Weipa area. In a later edition (1990) of the same journal, Pedley transferred the species to Acacia, as A. ommatospermum.

== Distribution and habitat ==
Acacia ommatosperma shrub has a limited range on the Cape York Peninsula around Weipa where it grows in gravelly ironstone soils.

== Conservation status ==
Acacia ommatosperma is listed as 'near threatened' under the Queensland Nature Conservation Act 1992.

== See also ==
- List of Acacia species
