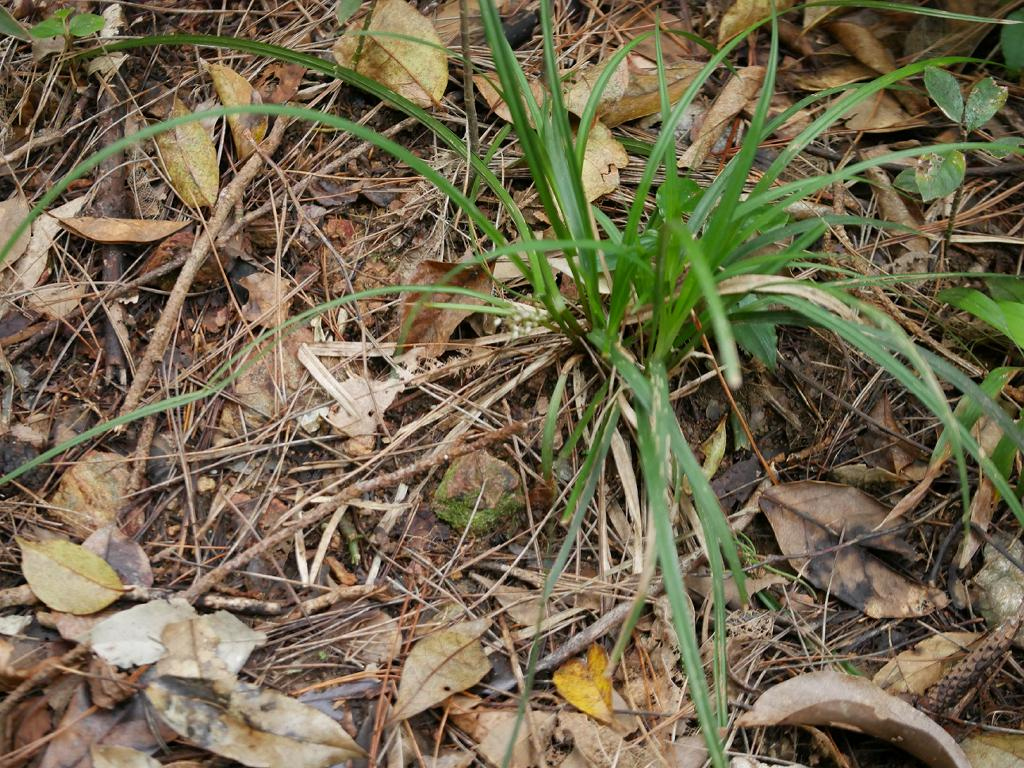

Scientific classification
- Kingdom: Plantae
- Clade: Tracheophytes
- Clade: Angiosperms
- Clade: Monocots
- Clade: Commelinids
- Order: Poales
- Family: Cyperaceae
- Genus: Carex
- Species: C. breviscapa

Binomial name
- Carex breviscapa C.B.Clarke, 1894

= Carex breviscapa =

Species of sedge

Carex breviscapa is a tussock-forming perennial in the family Cyperaceae. It is native to eastern parts of the south east Asia and north eastern Australia

== Description ==
The sedge has a short rhizome and culms that reach a height of 10 to 20 cm (3.9 to 7.9 in). It has dark brown coloured basal sheaths that eventually split down into fibers. The flat, leathery and smooth dark green coloured leaves are usually have a greater length that the culms Leaves longer than culm and have a width of 4 to 7 mm (0.16 to 0.28 in). It has modified leaflets that grow at the base of the inflorescence that are much longer than the inflorescence itself. Each inflorescence has three to five nodes with three to five spikes at each node. The mal spikes are located at the end of the culm and have a linear shape with a length of 17 to 45 mm (0.67 to 1.77 in) and a width of 1 to 1.5 mm (0.039 to 0.059 in). the female spikes are located laterally and have a narrow cylindrical shape that are 4 to 4.5 cm (1.6 to 1.8 in) in length and about 3 m (9.8 ft) wide.

== Taxonomy ==
The species was first described by the botanist Charles Baron Clarke in 1894 as a part of the Joseph Dalton Hooker work The Flora of British India. It has four synonyms; Carex curtisii, Carex laxisquamata, Carex lutchuensis and Carex obtusobracteata.

== Distribution ==
The sedge is often found in forested areas at an elevation of 400 to 1,000 m (1,300 to 3,300 ft). The range extends from China in the north west to Japan in the north east. It is also found as far west as Sri Lanka and then south of China in Thailand, Vietnam and Malaysia then through the islands of Borneo, Philippines, Indonesia and New Guinea and as far south east as Queensland in north east of Australia.

== See also ==
- List of Carex species
