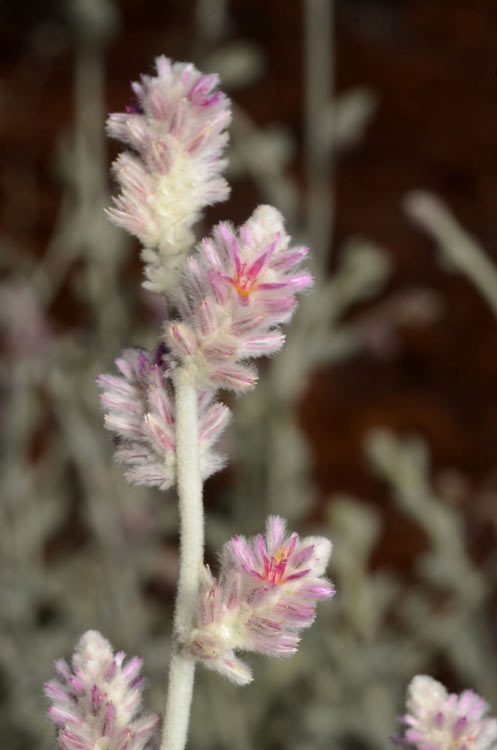

Scientific classification
- Kingdom: Plantae
- Clade: Tracheophytes
- Clade: Angiosperms
- Clade: Eudicots
- Order: Caryophyllales
- Family: Amaranthaceae
- Genus: Ptilotus
- Species: P. maconochiei

Binomial name
- Ptilotus maconochiei Benl

= Ptilotus maconochiei =

Species of plant

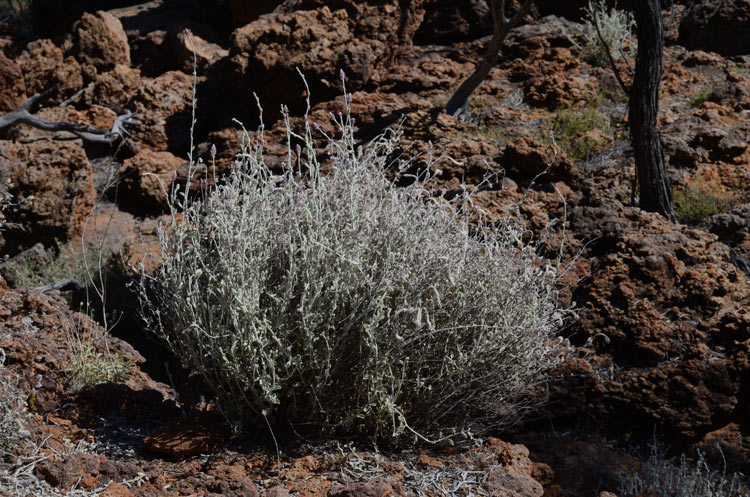
Habit in Idalia National Park

Ptilotus maconochiei is a species of flowering plant in the family Amaranthaceae and is endemic to inland Queensland in Australia. It is a tufted shrub with spatula-shaped or broadly elliptic leaves and compact spikes of dull pink flowers.

== Description ==
Ptilotus maconochiei is a tufted shrub that typically grows to about 80 cm (31 in) high and wide with woolly hairs on the stems and leaves. Its leaves are spatula-shaped or boradly elliptic, 8–20 mm (0.31–0.79 in) long, 10–15 mm (0.39–0.59 in) wide, thick and fleshy. The uppermost leaves grade into bracts. The flowers are purplish, turning pink and arranged in compact cone-shaped or egg-shaped spikes 7–12 mm (0.28–0.47 in) long and 8–11 mm (0.31–0.43 in) wide, each flower with perianth segments 4.5–5 mm (0.18–0.20 in) long.

== Taxonomy ==
Ptilotus maconochiei was first formally described in 1979 by Gerard Benl in the Journal of the Adelaide Botanic Gardens from specimens collected at the Mount Isa City Lookout in 1978. The specific epithet (maconochiei) honours "John R. Maconochie, senior botanist in the herbarium of the Northern Territory".

== Distribution and habitat ==
This species of foxtail grows on stony hills and is moderately widespread but sporadic between Mount Isa and Windorah in Queensland.

== Conservation status ==
Ptilotus maconochiei is listed as of "near threatened" under the Queensland Government Nature Conservation Act 1992.
