= Acacia homaloclada =

Conservation status
- Vulnerable (NCA)

Scientific classification
- Kingdom: Plantae
- Clade: Tracheophytes
- Clade: Angiosperms
- Clade: Eudicots
- Clade: Rosids
- Order: Fabales
- Family: Fabaceae
- Subfamily: Caesalpinioideae
- Clade: Mimosoid clade
- Genus: Acacia
- Species: A. homaloclada

Binomial name
- Acacia homaloclada F.Muell.
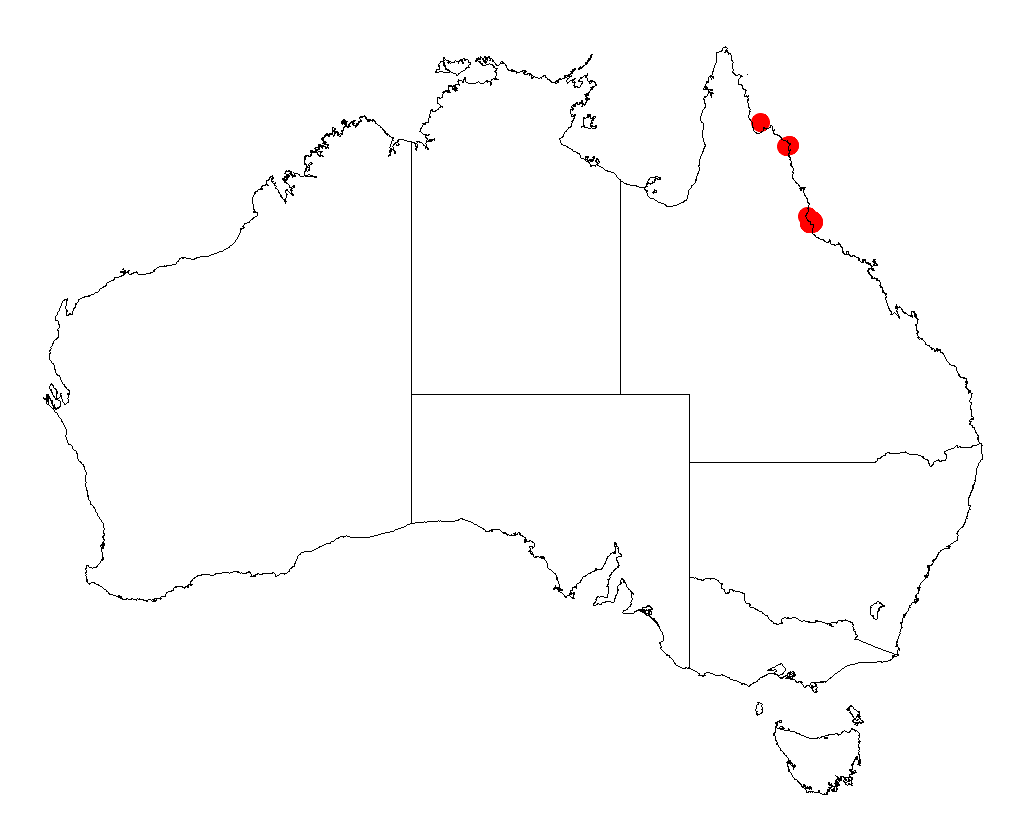
- Occurrence data from AVH

Synonyms
- Racosperma homalocladum (F.Muell.) Pedley

Species of legume

Acacia homaloclada is a species of flowering plant in the family Fabaceae and is endemic to coastal areas of north Queensland, Australia. It is a spindly, glabrous shrub with lance-shaped to narrowly elliptic phyllodes, spherical heads of golden yellow flowers, and flat, leathery pods

== Description ==
Acacia homaloclada' is a spindly, glabrous shrub that typically grows to a height of up to 5 m (16 ft) and has a pink new shoots and branchlets that are flattened towards the ends. Its phyllodes are lance-shaped to narrowly elliptic, 60–100 mm (2.4–3.9 in) long and 9–15 mm (0.35–0.59 in) wide with three prominent longitudinal veins and a gland 2–6 mm (0.079–0.236 in) above the base. The flowers are borne in two to five spherical heads in axils on peduncles 8–15 mm (0.31–0.59 in) long with 20 to 30 golden yellow flowers. Flowering occurs in November and December and the pods are flat, leathery, covered with a powdery bloom, up to 100 mm (3.9 in) long and 8–10 mm (0.31–0.39 in) wide, alternately rounded over the seeds and scarcely constricted between them. The seeds are more or less circular, flat, 4–5 mm (0.16–0.20 in) long, dull black with dark coloured aril.

== Taxonomy ==
Acacia homaloclada was first formally described in 1878 by Ferdinand von Mueller in his Fragmenta Phytographiae Australiae from specimens collected on Hinchinbrook Island by John Dallachy.

== Distribution and habitat ==
This species of wattle has a limited range in north Queensland from around Ingham including Hinchinbrook Island, where it is not common. It is usually found along watercourses in open Eucalypt woodland communities, growing in sandy soils.

== Conservation status ==
Acacia homaloclada is listed as "vulnerable" under the Queensland Nature Conservation Act 1992.

== See also ==
- List of Acacia species
