= Acacia polyadenia =

Scientific classification
- Kingdom: Plantae
- Clade: Tracheophytes
- Clade: Angiosperms
- Clade: Eudicots
- Clade: Rosids
- Order: Fabales
- Family: Fabaceae
- Subfamily: Caesalpinioideae
- Clade: Mimosoid clade
- Genus: Acacia
- Species: A. polyadenia

Binomial name
- Acacia polyadenia Pedley

Species of plant

Acacia polyadenia is a shrub or small tree belonging to the genus Acacia and the subgenus Juliflorae that is native to north eastern Australia.

== Description ==
The prostrate shrub or small tree has glabrous slender branchlets slender that are a red-brown colour and resinous when immature. Like most species of Acacia it has phyllodes rather than true leaves. The evergreen phyllodes have a linear-elliptic shape and can be shallowly recurved. The phyllodes have a length of 4 to 8.5 cm (1.6 to 3.3 in) and a width of 3 to 5 cm (1.2 to 2.0 in) and are resinous with young and are acute with a callus tip with 7 to 14 veins per face with a prominent midrib. When it blooms it produces simple inflorescences that occur singly or in pairs in the axils. The cylindrical flower-spikes are 10 to 20 mm (0.39 to 0.79 in) with yellow flowers that occur in bands. The woody seed pods that form after flowering have a narrowly oblong to oblanceolate shape and are narrowed toward the base. The resinous pods are around 4.5 cm (1.8 in) ling and have barely discernible longitudinal veins resinous with thick margins.

== Taxonomy ==
The species was first formally described in 1987 as Racosperma polyadenium by the botanist Leslie Pedley as part of the work Notes on Racosperma Martius (Leguminosae: Mimosoideae) as published in the journal Austrobaileya. It was transferred to genus Acacia in 1990. The species is commonly confused with Acacia drepanocarpa.

== Distribution ==
It is endemic to the a few islands off Central Queensland including Shaw Island in the Lindeman Group, Palm Island and Whitsunday Island where it is found on hillsides in heathland communities close to the beach growing in sandy soils.

== See also ==
- List of Acacia species
