= Acacia arbiana =

Conservation status
- Near Threatened (NCA)

Scientific classification
- Kingdom: Plantae
- Clade: Tracheophytes
- Clade: Angiosperms
- Clade: Eudicots
- Clade: Rosids
- Order: Fabales
- Family: Fabaceae
- Subfamily: Caesalpinioideae
- Clade: Mimosoid clade
- Genus: Acacia
- Species: A. arbiana

Binomial name
- Acacia arbiana Pedley

Synonyms
- Acacia sp. (Ropers Peak P.I.Forster PIF7209); Acacia sp. 16 (Roper Peak; A.Bean 630); Acacia sp. Roper Peak (A.Bean 630); Racosperma arbianum (Pedley) Pedley

Species of legume

Acacia arbiana, commonly known as Tony's wattle, is a species of flowering plant in the family Fabaceae and is endemic to a restricted area of central-eastern Queensland. It is a spreading shrub with crowded, linear phyllodes, and single heads of golden yellow flowers, and linear, papery pods up to 450 mm (18 in) long.

== Description ==
Acacia arbiana is a spreading shrub that typically grows to height of up to 1.5 m (4 ft 11 in). It has ribbed branchlets with a few scattered hairs pressed against the surface. Its phyllodes are green, linear and straight, 8–16 mm (0.31–0.63 in) long and 0.6–0.8 mm (0.024–0.031 in) wide, with a curved mucro 0.6 mm (0.024 in) long on the end. The phyllodes have long hairs more or less pressed against the surface, and a gland near its base. The flowers are arranged in a solitary heads in axils on a peduncle 8–10 mm (0.31–0.39 in) long, each head with 24 to 30 golden yellow flowers. Flowering occurs between July and August and the pods are papery, 450 mm (18 in) long and 10–14 mm (0.39–0.55 in) wide.

== Taxonomy ==
Acacia arbiana was first formally described by the botanist Leslie Pedley in 1999 in the journal Austrobaileya from specimens collected by Paul Irwin Forster in 1990. The specific epithet (arbiana) is derived from the initials of Anthony Russell Bean, "whose flowering specimens collected in 1987 clearly indicated the species to be undescribed."

== Distribution ==
This species of wattle is found in only a small area of eastern central Queensland to the east of Clermont where it is only found in the Peak Range around the summits of Ropers and Scotts Peak. It is found among heath-like vegetation communities growing in rocky soils.

== Conservation status ==
Acacia arbiana is listed as "near threatened" under the Queensland Government Nature Conservation Act 1992.

== See also ==
- List of Acacia species
