= Solanum hamulosum =

Conservation status
- Vulnerable (NCA)

Scientific classification
- Kingdom: Plantae
- Clade: Tracheophytes
- Clade: Angiosperms
- Clade: Eudicots
- Clade: Asterids
- Order: Solanales
- Family: Solanaceae
- Genus: Solanum
- Species: S. hamulosum

Binomial name
- Solanum hamulosum C.T.White

Species of shrub

Solanum hamulosum is a herb shrub which is endemic to tropical Northern Queensland near Cairns, Queensland.

== Distribution and habitat ==
This species endemic to North East Queensland near Cairns at an altitude of 650–1500 m occurring in disturbed areas in rainforests.

== Conservation status ==
Solanum hamulosum is listed as "vulnerable" under the Queensland Nature Conservation Act 1992. It is not listed under the Australian Government Environment Protection and Biodiversity Conservation Act 1999.
