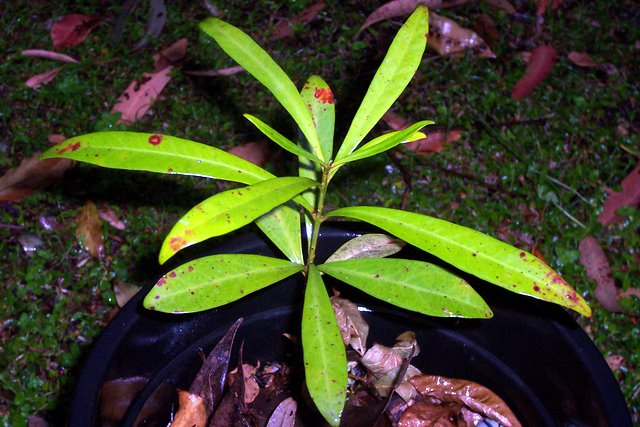
- Claudie satinash - seedling

Scientific classification
- Kingdom: Plantae
- Clade: Tracheophytes
- Clade: Angiosperms
- Clade: Eudicots
- Clade: Rosids
- Order: Myrtales
- Family: Myrtaceae
- Genus: Syzygium
- Species: S. pseudofastigiatum

Binomial name
- Syzygium pseudofastigiatum B.Hyland

= Syzygium pseudofastigiatum =

Claudie satinash

Species of tree

Syzygium pseudofastigiatum, known as the Claudie satinash is a rare rainforest tree of tropical Queensland, Australia. It can grow to 35 metres tall.
