= Pterostylis nigricans =

Dark greenhood

Scientific classification
- Kingdom: Plantae
- Clade: Tracheophytes
- Clade: Angiosperms
- Clade: Monocots
- Order: Asparagales
- Family: Orchidaceae
- Subfamily: Orchidoideae
- Tribe: Cranichideae
- Genus: Pterostylis
- Species: P. nigricans

Binomial name
- Pterostylis nigricans D.L.Jones & M.A.Clem.

Synonyms
- Speculantha nigricans (D.L.Jones & M.A.Clem.) D.L.Jones & M.A.Clem.

Species of orchid

Pterostylis nigricans, commonly known as the dark greenhood, is a species of orchid endemic to eastern Australia. As with similar orchids, the flowering plants differ from those which are not flowering. The non-flowering plants have a rosette of leaves but the flowering plants lack a rosette at the base but have up to six tiny green, white and brown flowers which have a rough texture.

== Description ==
Pterostylis nigricans is a terrestrial, perennial, deciduous, herb with an underground tuber and when not flowering, a rosette of three to eleven egg-shaped to heart-shaped leaves. Each leaf is 5–30 mm (0.2–1 in) long and 4–10 mm (0.2–0.4 in) wide on a petiole 3–5 mm (0.1–0.2 in) long. Flowering plants have up to six well-spaced flowers 9–10 mm (0.35–0.39 in) long and 4–5 mm (0.16–0.20 in) wide on a flowering stem 100–350 mm (4–10 in) tall. Up to three leaf rosettes are arranged on separate stems at the base of the flowering spike. The flowers are green and white with a dark chocolate-brown tip and have a rough surface texture. The dorsal sepal and petals are fused, forming a hood or "galea" over the column. The dorsal sepal curves forward and has a short point. The lateral sepals are erect, held closely against the galea with thread-like tips about 3 mm (0.1 in) long that do not project above the galea. The sinus between the bases of the lateral sepals almost closes off the front of the flower and has a small notch in the centre. The labellum is about 4 mm (0.2 in) long and 1 mm (0.04 in) wide and is not visible from outside the intact flower. Flowering occurs from March to May.

== Taxonomy and naming ==
Pterostylis nigricans was first formally described in 1988 by David Jones and Mark Clements from a specimen collected on Stradbroke Island and the description was published in the Austrobaileya. The specific epithet (nigricans) is a Latin word meaning "blackish", referring to the dark colour of the flowers.

== Distribution and habitat ==
The dark greenhood grows in forest, scrub and heath in coastal and near-coastal areas of south-eastern Queensland and in New South Wales north of Evans Head.
