= Styphelia grandiflora =

Scientific classification
- Kingdom: Plantae
- Clade: Tracheophytes
- Clade: Angiosperms
- Clade: Eudicots
- Clade: Asterids
- Order: Ericales
- Family: Ericaceae
- Genus: Styphelia
- Species: S. grandiflora

Binomial name
- Styphelia grandiflora (Pedley) Hislop, Crayn & Puente-Lel.
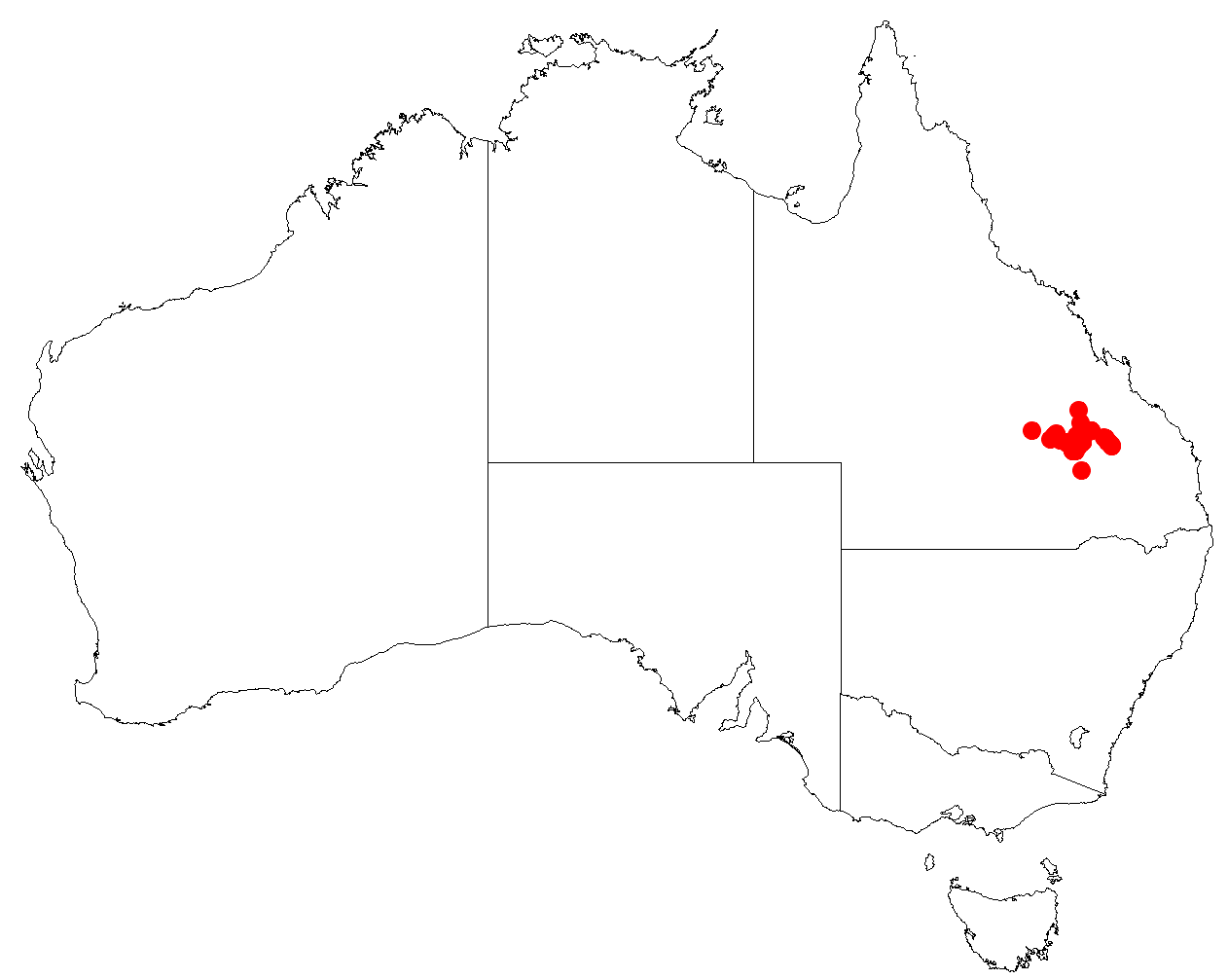
- Occurrence data from AVH

Synonyms
- Leucopogon grandiflorus Pedley

Species of shrub

Styphelia grandiflora is a species of flowering plant in the heath family Ericaceae and is endemic to Carnarvon National Park in south-eastern Queensland. It is a shrub with softly-hairy branchlets, oblong leaves and white flowers.

== Description ==
Styphelia grandiflora is a shrub with softly-hairy branchlets, that typically grows to a height of up to 2 m (6 ft 7 in). Its leaves are oblong, 8–10 mm (0.31–0.39 in) long and about 1.3 mm (0.051 in) wide with the edges rolled under. The flowers are arranged singly in upper leaf axils with bracts about 1 mm (0.039 in) long and bracteoles about 2 mm (0.079 in) long. The sepals are egg-shaped, about 4.5 mm (0.18 in) long and the petals are white, 12–15 mm (0.47–0.59 in) long and form a tube 8–9 mm (0.31–0.35 in) long with narrowly triangular lobes. The fruit is a more or less spherical drupe about 5 mm (0.20 in) long.

== Taxonomy ==
This species was first formally described in 1990 by Leslie Pedley who gave it the name Leucopogon grandiflorus in the journal Austrobaileya from specimens collected by Clifford Gittins in 1961. In 2020, Michael Hislop, Darren Crayn and Caroline Puente-Lelievre transferred the species to Styphelia as S. grandiflora in Australian Systematic Botany. The specific epithet (grandiflora) means "large-flowered", alluding to the flowers being probably the largest in the genus.

== Distribution and habitat ==
This styphelia grows on shallow sandy soil over sandstone in and near Carnarvon National Park.
