= List of Cryptocarya species =

Cryptocarya is a genus of plants in the family Lauraceae, native to east Africa, Asia, Australia, the Pacific and South America.

As of September 2026, Plants of the World Online accepts the following 365 species:

== A-B ==
- Cryptocarya acuminata Merr.
- Cryptocarya acutifolia H.W.Li
- Cryptocarya adpressa Munzinger & McPherson
- Cryptocarya agathophylla van der Werff
- Cryptocarya ainikinii Kosterm.
- Cryptocarya alba (Molina) Looser
- Cryptocarya albifrons Kosterm.
- Cryptocarya alleniana C.T.White
- Cryptocarya alseodaphnifolia Kosterm.
- Cryptocarya alticola Kosterm.
- Cryptocarya ambrensis van der Werff
- Cryptocarya ampla Merr.
- Cryptocarya amygdalina Nees
- Cryptocarya anamalayana Gamble
- Cryptocarya andamanica Hook.f.
- Cryptocarya angica Kaneh. & Hatus.
- Cryptocarya angulata C.T.White
- Cryptocarya angustifolia E.Mey. ex Meisn.
- Cryptocarya apamifolia Gamble
- Cryptocarya archboldiana C.K.Allen
- Cryptocarya arfakensis Kaneh. & Hatus.
- Cryptocarya argyrophylla C.K.Allen
- Cryptocarya aristata Kosterm.
- Cryptocarya aschersoniana Mez
- Cryptocarya atra Kosterm.
- Cryptocarya aurea (Kosterm.) Kosterm.
- Cryptocarya aureobrunnea C.K.Allen
- Cryptocarya aureosericea Kosterm.
- Cryptocarya austrokweichouensis X.H.Song
- Cryptocarya azurea Ezedin
- Cryptocarya balakrishnanii M.Gangop. & Chakrab.
- Cryptocarya bamagana B.Hyland
- Cryptocarya barbellata A.C.Sm.
- Cryptocarya barrabeae Munzinger & McPherson
- Cryptocarya beddomei Gamble
- Cryptocarya beilschmiediifolia Kosterm.
- Cryptocarya bellendenkerana B.Hyland
- Cryptocarya bernhardiensis C.K.Allen
- Cryptocarya bhutanica D.G.Long
- Cryptocarya bidwillii Meisn.
- Cryptocarya biswasii M.Gangop.
- Cryptocarya bitriplinervia Kosterm.
- Cryptocarya boemiensis Kaneh. & Hatus.
- Cryptocarya botelhensis P.L.R.Moraes
- Cryptocarya brachythyrsa H.W.Li
- Cryptocarya bracteolata Gamble
- Cryptocarya brassii C.K.Allen
- Cryptocarya brevipes C.K.Allen
- Cryptocarya bullata Kosterm.
- Cryptocarya burckiana Warb.

== C-D ==
- Cryptocarya caesia Blume
- Cryptocarya cagayanensis Merr.
- Cryptocarya calandoi Kosterm.
- Cryptocarya calcicola H.W.Li
- Cryptocarya calderi M.Gangop.
- Cryptocarya calelanensis Elmer
- Cryptocarya caloneura (Scheff.) Kosterm.
- Cryptocarya canaliculata van der Werff
- Cryptocarya capuronii Kosterm.
- Cryptocarya carrii Kosterm.
- Cryptocarya caryoptera Kosterm.
- Cryptocarya cavei M.Gangop. & Chakrab.
- Cryptocarya celebica (Koord.) Kosterm.
- Cryptocarya ceramica Kosterm.
- Cryptocarya cercophylla W.E.Cooper
- Cryptocarya chanthaburiensis Kosterm.
- Cryptocarya chartacea Kosterm.
- Cryptocarya chinensis (Hance) Hemsl.
- Cryptocarya chingii W.C.Cheng
- Cryptocarya chrysea Munzinger & McPherson
- Cryptocarya citriformis (Vell.) P.L.R.Moraes
- Cryptocarya clarksoniana B.Hyland
- Cryptocarya claudiana B.Hyland
- Cryptocarya cocosoides B.Hyland
- Cryptocarya concinna Hance
- Cryptocarya conduplicata Munzinger & McPherson
- Cryptocarya constricta C.K.Allen
- Cryptocarya cordata C.K.Allen
- Cryptocarya cordifolia Kosterm.
- Cryptocarya coriacea (Kosterm.) van der Werff
- Cryptocarya corrugata C.T.White & W.D.Francis
- Cryptocarya costata Blume
- Cryptocarya crassifolia Baker
- Cryptocarya crassinerviopsis Kosterm.
- Cryptocarya cunninghamii Meisn.
- Cryptocarya cuprea Kosterm.
- Cryptocarya darusensis Kosterm.
- Cryptocarya dealbata Baker
- Cryptocarya dekae M.Gangop.
- Cryptocarya densiflora Blume
- Cryptocarya depauperata H.W.Li
- Cryptocarya depressa Warb.
- Cryptocarya dipterocarpifolia Kosterm.
- Cryptocarya diversifolia Blume
- Cryptocarya dorrigoensis Frodin ex B.Hyland & Floyd
- Cryptocarya durifolia Kosterm.

== E-H ==
- Cryptocarya edanoi Merr.
- Cryptocarya elegans (Reinecke) A.C.Sm.
- Cryptocarya elliptica Schltr.
- Cryptocarya elliptifolia Merr.
- Cryptocarya elongata Kosterm.
- Cryptocarya endiandrifolia Kosterm.
- Cryptocarya enervis Hook.f.
- Cryptocarya engleriana Teschner
- Cryptocarya erythroxylon Maiden & Betche
- Cryptocarya euphlebia Merr.
- Cryptocarya everettii Merr.
- Cryptocarya exfoliata C.K.Allen
- Cryptocarya fagifolia Gamble
- Cryptocarya ferrarsi King ex Hook.f.
- Cryptocarya ferrea Blume
- Cryptocarya filicifolia (Kosterm.) Kosterm.
- Cryptocarya flavescens (Kosterm.) van der Werff
- Cryptocarya flavisperma Kosterm.
- Cryptocarya floydii Kosterm.
- Cryptocarya fluminensis Kosterm.
- Cryptocarya foetida R.T.Baker
- Cryptocarya forbesii Gamble
- Cryptocarya foveolata C.T.White & W.D.Francis
- Cryptocarya foxworthyi Elmer
- Cryptocarya fulva Kosterm.
- Cryptocarya fusca Gillespie
- Cryptocarya fuscopilosa Teschner
- Cryptocarya gigantocarpa Kosterm.
- Cryptocarya glabriflora van der Werff
- Cryptocarya glauca Merr.
- Cryptocarya glaucescens R.Br.
- Cryptocarya glauciphylla Elmer
- Cryptocarya glaucocarpa B.Hyland
- Cryptocarya globosa C.K.Allen
- Cryptocarya globularia Kosterm. ex de Kok
- Cryptocarya gonioclada Kaneh. & Hatus.
- Cryptocarya gracilis Schltr.
- Cryptocarya graehneriana Teschner
- Cryptocarya grandis B.Hyland
- Cryptocarya gregsonii Maiden
- Cryptocarya griffithiana Wight
- Cryptocarya guianensis Meisn.
- Cryptocarya guillauminii Kosterm.
- Cryptocarya hainanensis Merr.
- Cryptocarya hartleyi Kosterm.
- Cryptocarya helicina Kosterm.
- Cryptocarya hornei Gillespie
- Cryptocarya hydrantha Ezedin
- Cryptocarya hypospodia F.Muell.

== I-M ==
- Cryptocarya idenburgensis C.K.Allen
- Cryptocarya ilocana S.Vidal
- Cryptocarya impressa Miq.
- Cryptocarya impressivena Kaneh. & Hatus.
- Cryptocarya insularis Vasudeva Rao & Chakrab.
- Cryptocarya intermedia Elmer
- Cryptocarya invasiorum Kosterm.
- Cryptocarya iridescens Kosterm.
- Cryptocarya jacarepaguensis Vattimo-Gil
- Cryptocarya kaengkrachanensis M.Z.Zhang, Yahara & Tagane
- Cryptocarya kajewskii C.K.Allen
- Cryptocarya kamahar Teschner
- Cryptocarya krameri van der Werff
- Cryptocarya kurzii Hook.f.
- Cryptocarya kwangtungensis H.T.Chang
- Cryptocarya laevigata Blume
- Cryptocarya lanceolata Merr.
- Cryptocarya lancifolia A.C.Sm.
- Cryptocarya lancilimba Kosterm.
- Cryptocarya lanuginosa (Teschner) Kosterm.
- Cryptocarya laotica (Gagnep.) Kosterm.
- Cryptocarya latifolia Sond.
- Cryptocarya lauriflora (Blanco) Merr.
- Cryptocarya lawsonii Gamble
- Cryptocarya ledermannii Teschner
- Cryptocarya leiana C.K.Allen
- Cryptocarya leptospermoides Kosterm.
- Cryptocarya leucophylla B.Hyland
- Cryptocarya liebertiana Engl.
- Cryptocarya lifuensis Guillaumin
- Cryptocarya litoralis van der Werff
- Cryptocarya lividula B.Hyland
- Cryptocarya loheri Merr.
- Cryptocarya longepetiolata Kosterm.
- Cryptocarya longifolia Kosterm.
- Cryptocarya loureirii Nees
- Cryptocarya louvelii Danguy
- Cryptocarya lucida Blume
- Cryptocarya lyoniifolia S.Lee & F.N.Wei
- Cryptocarya macdonaldii B.Hyland
- Cryptocarya mackeei Kosterm.
- Cryptocarya mackinnoniana F.Muell.
- Cryptocarya maclurei Merr.
- Cryptocarya macrocarpa Guillaumin
- Cryptocarya macrodesme Schltr.
- Cryptocarya macrophylla Gamble
- Cryptocarya maculata H.W.Li
- Cryptocarya magnifolia Teschner
- Cryptocarya malayana de Kok
- Cryptocarya mandioccana Meisn.
- Cryptocarya mannii Hillebr.
- Cryptocarya massoy (Oken) Kosterm.
- Cryptocarya medicinalis C.T.White
- Cryptocarya megaphylla Kosterm.
- Cryptocarya meisneriana Frodin
- Cryptocarya melanocarpa B.Hyland
- Cryptocarya membranacea Thwaites
- Cryptocarya metcalfiana C.K.Allen
- Cryptocarya micrantha Meisn.
- Cryptocarya microcos Kosterm.
- Cryptocarya microneura Meisn.
- Cryptocarya mindanaensis Elmer
- Cryptocarya minutifolia C.K.Allen
- Cryptocarya montana (Kosterm.) van der Werff
- Cryptocarya moschata Nees & Mart.
- Cryptocarya multiflora van der Werff
- Cryptocarya multinervis Teschner
- Cryptocarya multipaniculata Teschner
- Cryptocarya murrayi F.Muell.
- Cryptocarya muthuvariana R.Jagad., P.Suresh Kumar, Gangapr. & S.P.Mathew
- Cryptocarya myrcioides S.Moore
- Cryptocarya myristicoides Baker
- Cryptocarya myrtifolia Stapf

== N-P ==
- Cryptocarya nana Kosterm.
- Cryptocarya natalensis (J.H.Ross) Kosterm.
- Cryptocarya nigra Kosterm.
- Cryptocarya nitens (Blume) Koord. & Valeton
- Cryptocarya nothofagetorum Kosterm.
- Cryptocarya nova-anglica B.Hyland & Floyd
- Cryptocarya oblata F.M.Bailey
- Cryptocarya obliqua Blume
- Cryptocarya oblonga (Kosterm.) van der Werff
- Cryptocarya oblongata Merr.
- Cryptocarya obovata R.Br.
- Cryptocarya occidentalis van der Werff
- Cryptocarya ocoteifolia Kosterm.
- Cryptocarya odorata Guillaumin
- Cryptocarya oligocarpa Merr.
- Cryptocarya oligophlebia Merr.
- Cryptocarya onoprienkoana B.Hyland
- Cryptocarya oubatchensis Schltr.
- Cryptocarya ovalifolia (Danguy) van der Werff
- Cryptocarya ovata Teschner
- Cryptocarya ovatocaudata Kosterm.
- Cryptocarya ovoidea Munzinger & McPherson
- Cryptocarya pachyphylla Kosterm.
- Cryptocarya palawanensis Merr.
- Cryptocarya pallens Kosterm.
- Cryptocarya pallida Merr.
- Cryptocarya pallidifolia Kosterm.
- Cryptocarya palmerensis C.K.Allen
- Cryptocarya panamensis P.L.R.Moraes & van der Werff
- Cryptocarya papuana Kamik.
- Cryptocarya parallelinervia Kosterm.
- Cryptocarya parinarifolia Kosterm.
- Cryptocarya parinarioides A.C.Sm.
- Cryptocarya parvifolia Merr.
- Cryptocarya pauciflora Baker
- Cryptocarya perareolata (Kosterm.) van der Werff
- Cryptocarya pergamentacea C.K.Allen
- Cryptocarya pergracilis Kosterm.
- Cryptocarya perlucida C.K.Allen
- Cryptocarya pervillei Baill.
- Cryptocarya petelotii Kosterm. ex H.H.Pham
- Cryptocarya petiolata van der Werff
- Cryptocarya phyllostemon Kosterm.
- Cryptocarya pleurosperma C.T.White & W.D.Francis
- Cryptocarya pluricostata Kosterm.
- Cryptocarya polyneura (Kosterm.) van der Werff
- Cryptocarya praetervisa M.Gangop., Chakrab. & A.S.Chauhan
- Cryptocarya procera Talbot
- Cryptocarya pulchella Teschner
- Cryptocarya pulchrinervia Kosterm.
- Cryptocarya pullenii Kosterm.
- Cryptocarya pusilla Teschner
- Cryptocarya pustulata Kosterm.
- Cryptocarya putida B.Hyland

== R-S ==
- Cryptocarya ramosii Merr.
- Cryptocarya rarinervia S.Moore
- Cryptocarya renicarpa Kosterm.
- Cryptocarya resinosa Kosterm.
- Cryptocarya reticulata Blume
- Cryptocarya retusa (Willd. ex Nees) van der Werff
- Cryptocarya revoluta van der Werff
- Cryptocarya rhizophoretum Kosterm.
- Cryptocarya rhodosperma B.Hyland
- Cryptocarya riedeliana P.L.R.Moraes
- Cryptocarya rifaii Kosterm.
- Cryptocarya rigida Meisn.
- Cryptocarya rigidifolia van der Werff
- Cryptocarya robynsiana Kosterm.
- Cryptocarya roemeri Lauterb.
- Cryptocarya rotundifolia Kosterm.
- Cryptocarya rubiginosa Griff.
- Cryptocarya rubra Blume
- Cryptocarya rugulosa Hook.f.
- Cryptocarya ruruvaiensis Kosterm.
- Cryptocarya saccharata B.Hyland
- Cryptocarya saligna Mez
- Cryptocarya samarensis Merr.
- Cryptocarya samoensis Christoph.
- Cryptocarya schlechteri Teschner
- Cryptocarya schmidii Kosterm.
- Cryptocarya schoddei Kosterm.
- Cryptocarya sclerophylla B.Hyland
- Cryptocarya sellowiana P.L.R.Moraes
- Cryptocarya septentrionalis van der Werff
- Cryptocarya sericeotriplinervia Kosterm.
- Cryptocarya simonsii Kosterm.
- Cryptocarya sleumeri Kosterm.
- Cryptocarya smaragdina B.Hyland
- Cryptocarya spathulata Kosterm.
- Cryptocarya splendens Kosterm.
- Cryptocarya stenophylla van der Werff
- Cryptocarya stocksii Meisn.
- Cryptocarya strictifolia Kosterm.
- Cryptocarya subbullata Kosterm.
- Cryptocarya subfalcata C.K.Allen
- Cryptocarya sublanuginosa Kosterm.
- Cryptocarya subtrinervis Kaneh. & Hatus.
- Cryptocarya subtriplinervia (Kosterm.) van der Werff
- Cryptocarya subvelutina Elmer
- Cryptocarya sulavesiana Kosterm.
- Cryptocarya sulcata C.K.Allen
- Cryptocarya sumatrana Kosterm.
- Cryptocarya sumbawaensis Kosterm.

== T-Z ==
- Cryptocarya tannaensis Guillaumin
- Cryptocarya tawaensis Merr.
- Cryptocarya tebaensis Teschner
- Cryptocarya tesselata Kosterm.
- Cryptocarya tetragona C.K.Allen
- Cryptocarya teysmanniana Miq.
- Cryptocarya thouvenotii (Danguy) Kosterm.
- Cryptocarya todayensis Elmer
- Cryptocarya transvaalensis Burtt Davy
- Cryptocarya transversa Kosterm.
- Cryptocarya triplinervis R.Br.
- Cryptocarya tsangii Nakai
- Cryptocarya tuanku-bujangii Kosterm.
- Cryptocarya turbinata Gillespie
- Cryptocarya turrilliana A.C.Sm.
- Cryptocarya umbonata C.K.Allen
- Cryptocarya vacciniifolia Stapf
- Cryptocarya vanderwerffii Kottaim.
- Cryptocarya velloziana P.L.R.Moraes
- Cryptocarya velutina Kosterm.
- Cryptocarya velutinosa Kosterm.
- Cryptocarya verrucosa Teschner
- Cryptocarya vidalii (Elmer) Merr.
- Cryptocarya villarii S.Vidal
- Cryptocarya viridiflora Kosterm.
- Cryptocarya vulgaris B.Hyland
- Cryptocarya weinlandii K.Schum.
- Cryptocarya whiffiniana Le Cussan & B.Hyland
- Cryptocarya whiteana C.K.Allen
- Cryptocarya wiedensis P.L.R.Moraes
- Cryptocarya wightiana Thwaites
- Cryptocarya wilderiana Christoph.
- Cryptocarya williwilliana B.Hyland & Floyd
- Cryptocarya wilsonii Guillaumin
- Cryptocarya womersleyi Kosterm.
- Cryptocarya woodii Engl.
- Cryptocarya wrayi Gamble
- Cryptocarya wyliei Stapf
- Cryptocarya xylophylla Kosterm.
- Cryptocarya yaanica N.Chao
- Cryptocarya yasuniensis P.L.R.Moraes & van der Werff
- Cryptocarya yunnanensis H.W.Li
- Cryptocarya zamboangensis Merr.
- Cryptocarya zollingeriana Miq.
