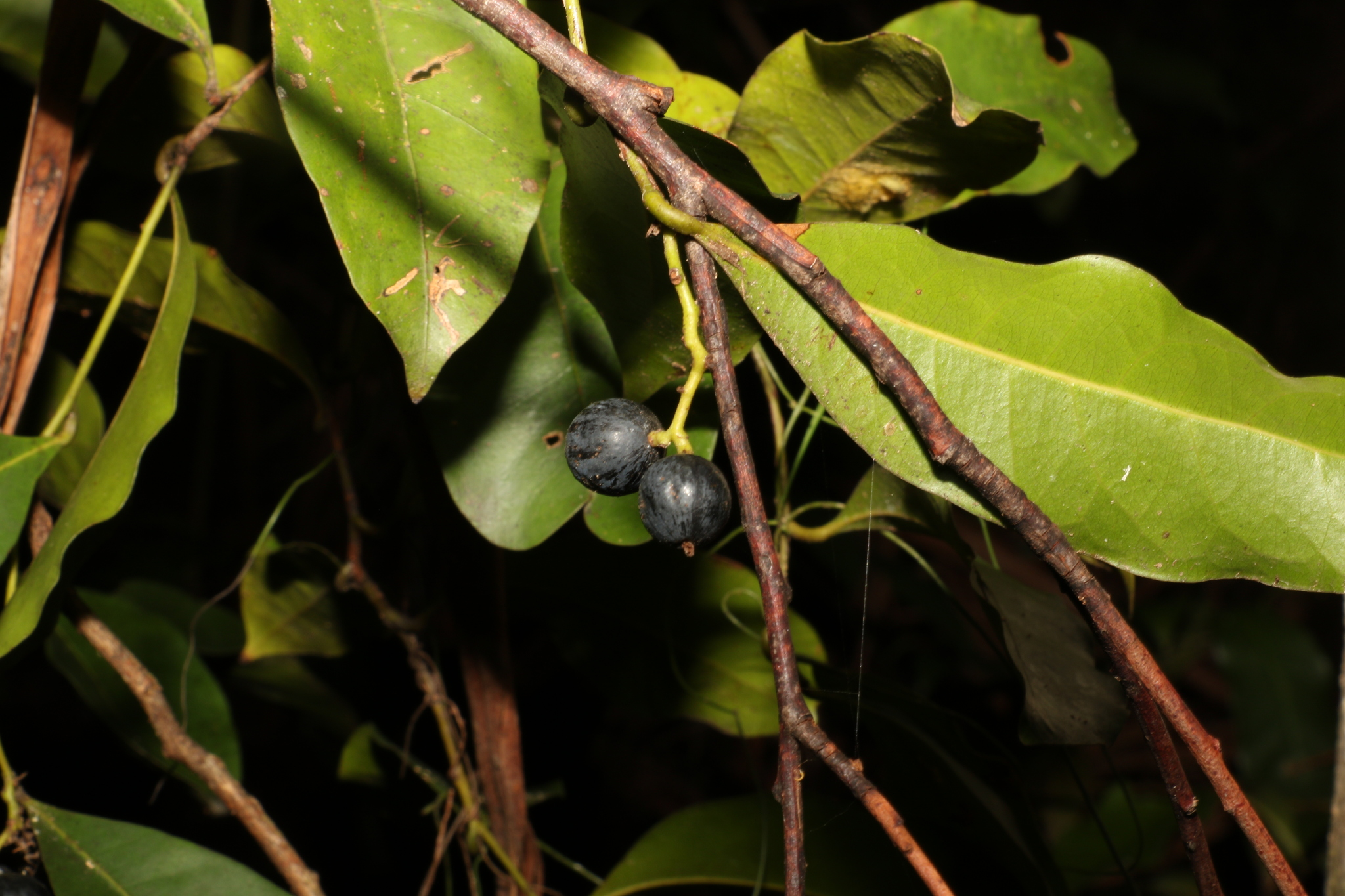
- Fruit of Cryptocarya sclerophylla

Conservation status
- Least Concern (IUCN 3.1)

Scientific classification
- Kingdom: Plantae
- Clade: Tracheophytes
- Clade: Angiosperms
- Clade: Magnoliids
- Order: Laurales
- Family: Lauraceae
- Genus: Cryptocarya
- Species: C. sclerophylla

Binomial name
- Cryptocarya sclerophylla B.Hyland

= Cryptocarya sclerophylla =

Species of tree

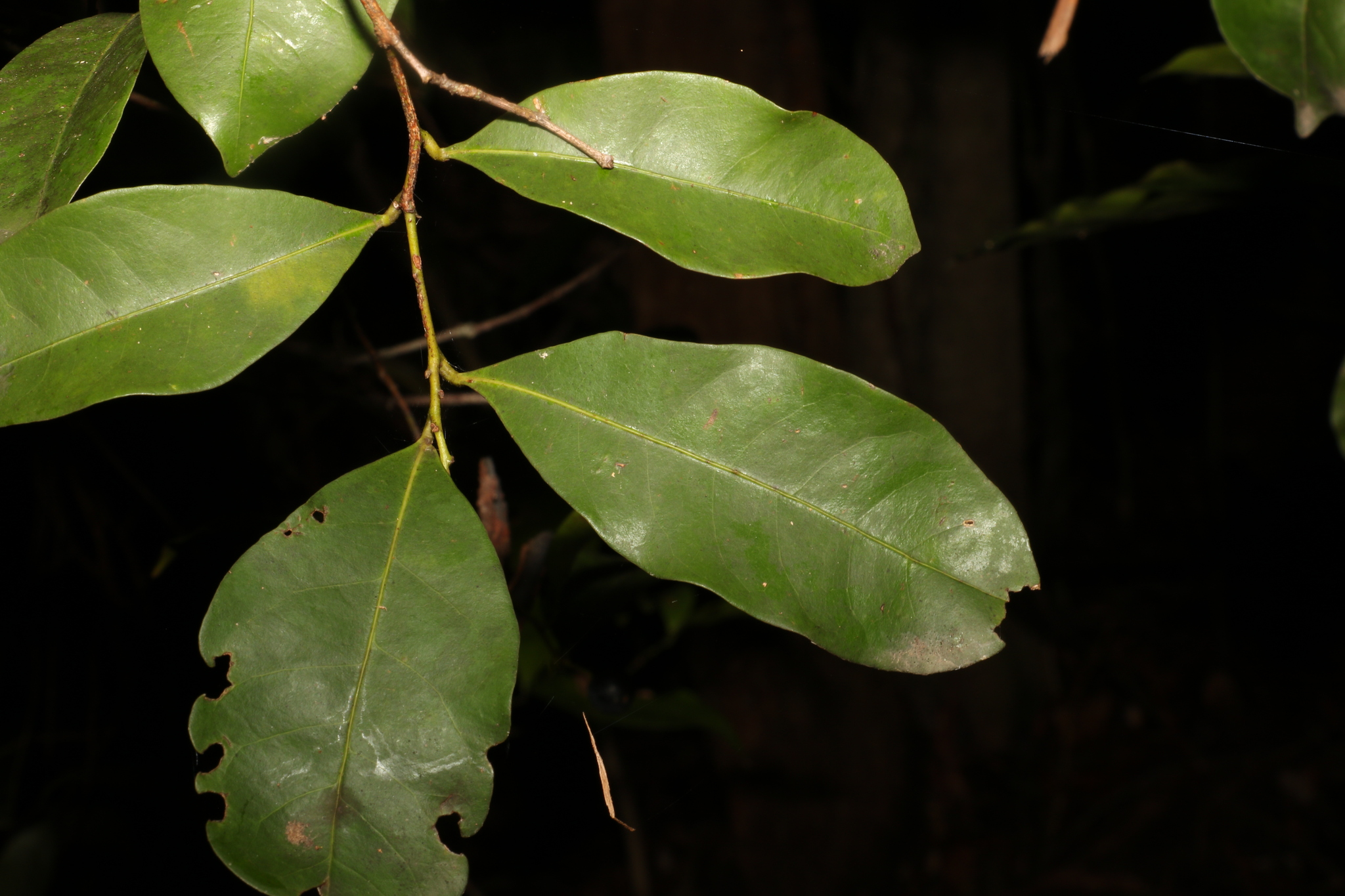
Leaves

Cryptocarya sclerophylla, commonly known as totempole, is a species of flowering plant in the family Lauraceae and is endemic to eastern Australia. It is a tree or shrub with elliptic leaves, creamy green, perfumed flowers, and spherical or elliptic black drupes.

== Description ==
Cryptocarya sclerophylla is a tree that typically grows to a height of up to 10 m (33 ft), its stems not buttressed. Its leaves are elliptic, 65–120 mm (2.6–4.7 in) long and 20–45 mm (0.8–1.8 in) wide, on a petiole 4–6 mm (0.16–0.24 in) long. The flowers are creamy green, perfumed, and arranged in panicles about the same length as the leaves. The perianth tube is 1.5–1.6 mm (0.059–0.063 in) long and 1.3–1.5 mm (0.051–0.059 in) wide, the outer anthers 0.7–0.8 mm (0.028–0.031 in) long and 0.5–0.6 mm (0.020–0.024 in) wide, the inner anthers 0.6–0.8 mm (0.024–0.031 in) long and 0.5 mm (0.020 in) wide. Flowering occurs from September to November, and the fruit is a spherical or elliptic black drupe, 14–16 mm (0.55–0.63 in) long and 11–12 mm (0.43–0.47 in) wide with cream-coloured cotyledons.

== Taxonomy ==
Cryptocarya sclerophylla was first formally described in 1989 by Bernard Hyland in Australian Systematic Botany from specimens he collected near Currumbin Creek in 1982. The specific epithet (sclerophylla) means 'hard-leaved'.

== Distribution and habitat ==
This species of Cryptocarya grows in rainforest between 50 and 200 m (160 and 660 ft) elevation, often in places where there are long periods of water stress, from Gympie in south-east Queensland to the far north coast of New South Wales.

== Conservation status ==
This species of Cryptocarya is listed as "of least concern" under the Queensland Government Nature Conservation Act 1992.
