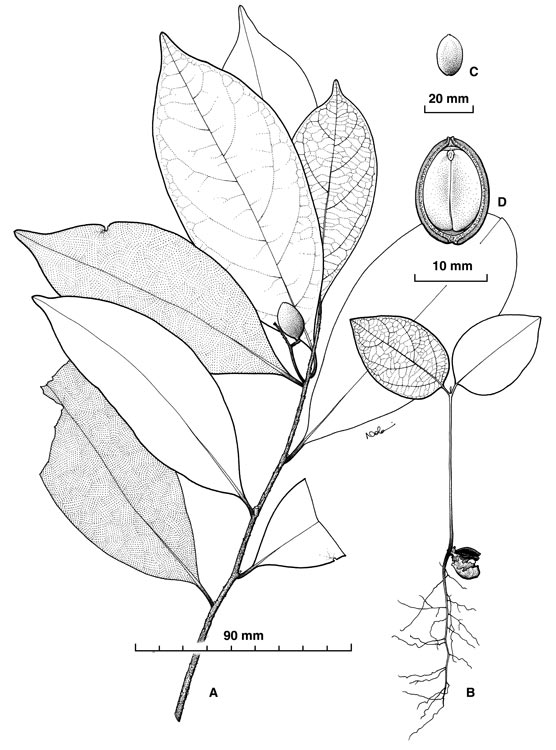

Scientific classification
- Kingdom: Plantae
- Clade: Tracheophytes
- Clade: Angiosperms
- Clade: Magnoliids
- Order: Laurales
- Family: Lauraceae
- Genus: Cryptocarya
- Species: C. glaucocarpa

Binomial name
- Cryptocarya glaucocarpa B.Hyland

= Cryptocarya glaucocarpa =

Species of tree

Cryptocarya glaucocarpa is a tree in the laurel family and is endemic to Cape York Peninsula in Queensland. It is a tree with lance-shaped to elliptic leaves, flowers in panicles shorter than the leaves, black to bluish-black and glaucous drupes.

== Description ==
Cryptocarya glaucocarpa is a tree that typically grows to a height of 10 m (33 ft), its stems usually buttressed. Its leaves are lance-shaped to elliptic, 90–160 mm (3.5–6.3 in) long and 30–65 mm (1.2–2.6 in) wide on a petiole 7–9 mm (0.28–0.35 in) long. The flowers are arranged in panicles that are shorter than the leaves. Flowering has been observed in December, and the fruit is an elliptic black or bluish-black drupe 13–17 mm (0.51–0.67 in) long and 10–12 mm (0.39–0.47 in) wide, but the colour is often hidden by a glaucous bloom.

== Taxonomy ==
Cryptocarya glaucocarpa was first formally described in 1989 by Bernard Hyland in Australian Systematic Botany from specimens collected near the Claudie River.

== Distribution and habitat ==
This species of Cryptocarya grows in rainforest on soils derived from granite and metamorphic rocks at altitudes up to 500 m (1,600 ft) on the Claudie River plain on Cape York Peninsula.
