= Cryptocarya cercophylla =

Scientific classification
- Kingdom: Plantae
- Clade: Tracheophytes
- Clade: Angiosperms
- Clade: Magnoliids
- Order: Laurales
- Family: Lauraceae
- Genus: Cryptocarya
- Species: C. cercophylla

Binomial name
- Cryptocarya cercophylla W.E.Cooper

Species of tree

Cryptocarya cercophylla is a species of flowering plant in the laurel family and is endemic to Wooroonooran National Park in north Queensland. It is a poorly-formed tree with egg-shaped to elliptic leaves, the flowers creamy-green or cream-coloured and tube-shaped, and the fruit an elliptic, red to shiny black drupe.

== Description ==
Cryptocarya cercophylla is a small, poorly-formed tree that typically grows to a height of 10 m (33 ft), sometimes with coppice shoots at the base, its stems not buttressed. Its leaves are egg-shaped to elliptic, 53–100 mm (2.1–3.9 in) long and 22–45 mm (0.87–1.77 in) wide on a petiole 7–13 mm (0.28–0.51 in) long. The flowers are usually arranged in racemes of 4 to 7, 10–28 mm (0.39–1.10 in) long and are not fragrant. The tepals are creamy-green or cream-coloured, the outer tepals 1.2–1.7 mm (0.047–0.067 in) long and 1.2–1.5 mm (0.047–0.059 in) wide, the inner tepals 1.7 mm (0.067 in) long and 1.6 mm (0.063 in) wide. Flowering has been observed in July and from October to December, and the fruit is a red to shiny black, elliptic or egg-shaped drupe 16.5–20 mm (0.65–0.79 in) long and 10–14.5 mm (0.39–0.57 in) wide.

== Taxonomy ==
Cryptocarya cercophylla was first formally described in 2013 by Wendy Elizabeth Cooper in the journal Austrobaileya from specimens collected near Mount Bartle Frere. The specific epithet (cercophylla) means 'tail-leaf', referring to the tail-like tip of the leaf.

== Distribution and habitat ==
This species of Cryptocarya grows as an understorey tree in high rainfall rainforest in Wooroonooran National Park in the Wet Tropics bioregion or north-eastern Queensland.
