= Cryptocarya caesia =

Conservation status
- Vulnerable (IUCN 3.1)

Scientific classification
- Kingdom: Plantae
- Clade: Tracheophytes
- Clade: Angiosperms
- Clade: Magnoliids
- Order: Laurales
- Family: Lauraceae
- Genus: Cryptocarya
- Species: C. caesia

Binomial name
- Cryptocarya caesia Blume

Species of tree

Cryptocarya caesia is a species of flowering plant in the family Lauraceae. It is a tree native to Java; according to Plants of the World Online it is also native to Peninsular Malaysia and Vietnam, while according to the IUCN Red List it is native to Java and Sumatra and possibly the Andaman Islands.

The species was originally described by Carl Ludwig Blume in 1851 from a specimen collected in Java. Later, in 1884, George King located this tree in Port Blair in the Andaman Islands and collected some herbarium specimens.

These specimens mostly agree with Blume's collections from Java except for having a glabrous midrib underneath. King annotated the herbarium sheet with "the Andaman specimen may be Cryptocaria caesia Blume or a new species" because he could not complete the identification of the Andaman specimen due to lack of fruits in Blume's specimen.

Later, C. E. Parkinson reported this species from Long Island of the North Andaman group in 1916. There were no further records of this species from the Andaman Islands until 1990. Mathew in 1990 located this species from the Mount Harriet National Park (South Andaman).

It is ~20-meter-tall evergreen tree found in the evergreen forests of Mount Harriet near the rock Kala Pather at an approximate elevation of 400 meters. Young parts of the branchlets are rusty pubescent. Inflorescences are rusty tomentose. Fruits are globose and about 6 millimeters in diameter.
