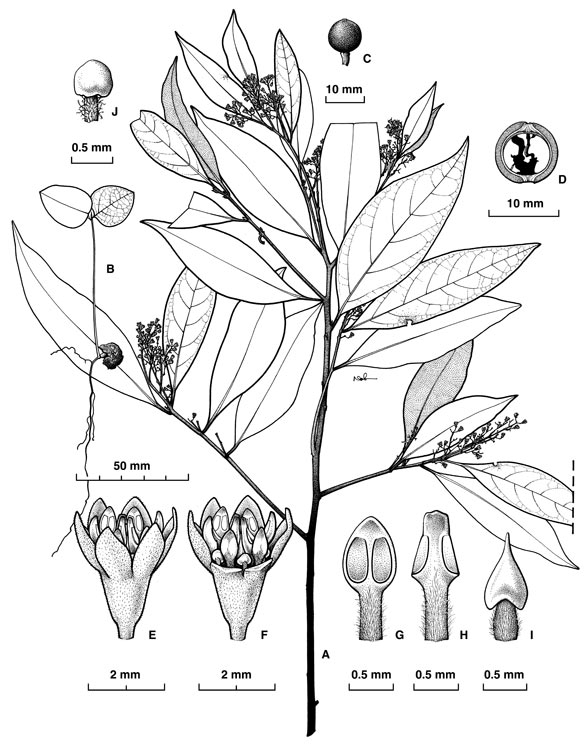

Conservation status
- Least Concern (IUCN 3.1)

Scientific classification
- Kingdom: Plantae
- Clade: Tracheophytes
- Clade: Angiosperms
- Clade: Magnoliids
- Order: Laurales
- Family: Lauraceae
- Genus: Cryptocarya
- Species: C. bamagana

Binomial name
- Cryptocarya bamagana B.Hyland

= Cryptocarya bamagana =

Bamaga walnut

Species of tree

Cryptocarya bamagana, commonly known as Bamaga walnut, is a tree in the laurel family and is endemic to Cape York Peninsula. Its leaves are lance-shaped to elliptic or egg-shaped, the flowers cream-coloured and tube-shaped, and the fruit a spherical black drupe.

== Description ==
Cryptocarya bamagana is a rainforest tree that typically grows to a height of 15 m (49 ft), its stem sometimes buttressed. Its leaves are lance-shaped to elliptic, 80–140 mm (3.1–5.5 in) long and 30–50 mm (1.2–2.0 in) wide on a petiole 7–12 mm (0.28–0.47 in) long. The flowers are arranged in clusters shorter than the leaves and sometimes have an unpleasant odour. The tepals are 1.6–1.7 mm (0.063–0.067 in) long, the outer anthers 0.8 mm (0.031 in) long and 0.6 mm (0.024 in) wide, the inner anthers 0.7 mm (0.028 in) long and 5 mm (0.20 in) wide. Flowering occurs from November to December, and the fruit is a spherical black drupe 9–10 mm (0.35–0.39 in) long and 9.5–10 mm (0.37–0.39 in) wide.

== Taxonomy ==
Cryptocarya bamagana was first formally described in 1989 by Bernard Hyland in Australian Systematic Botany, from specimens collected by Hyland collected near Bamaga in 1982.

== Distribution and habitat ==
Bamaga walnut grows near creeks in rainforest at elevations from 20–100 m (66–328 ft) above sea level on Cape York Peninsula in Queensland.
