= Cryptocarya whiffiniana =

Scientific classification
- Kingdom: Plantae
- Clade: Tracheophytes
- Clade: Angiosperms
- Clade: Magnoliids
- Order: Laurales
- Family: Lauraceae
- Genus: Cryptocarya
- Species: C. whiffiniana

Binomial name
- Cryptocarya whiffiniana Le Cussan & B.Hyland

Species of flowering plant

Cryptocarya whiffiniana is a species of flowering plant in the family Lauraceae and is endemic to north Queensland. It is a tree with oblong, lance-shaped or narrowly elliptic leaves, creamy green flowers, and elliptic glaucous or black drupes.

== Description ==
Cryptocarya whiffiniana is a tree that typically grows to a height of up to 20 m (66 ft), its stems buttressed. Its leaves are oblong, lance-shaped or narrowly elliptic, 70–110 mm (2.8–4.3 in) long and 20–40 mm (0.8–1.6 in) wide, on a petiole 5–8 mm (0.20–0.31 in) long. The flowers are creamy green but not perfumed, and arranged in panicles shorter than the leaves. The perianth tube is 1.5–1.6 mm (0.059–0.063 in) long and about 0.6 mm (0.024 in) wide, the outer tepals 1.9–2.1 mm (0.075–0.083 in) long and 0.9–1.1 mm (0.035–0.043 in) wide, the inner tepals 1.8–2.1 mm (0.071–0.083 in) long and about 1.2 mm (0.047 in) wide. The outer anthers are 0.4–0.8 mm (0.016–0.031 in) long and 0.5–0.6 mm (0.020–0.024 in) wide, the inner anthers 0.7–0.9 mm (0.028–0.035 in) long and 0.4–0.5 mm (0.016–0.020 in) wide. Flowering has been recorded in August and November, and the fruit is an elliptic glaucous or black drupe, 10–13 mm (0.39–0.51 in) long and 8–9 mm (0.31–0.35 in) wide with cream-coloured cotyledons.

== Taxonomy ==
Cryptocarya whiffiniana was first formally described in 2007 by J. Le Cussan and Bernard Hyland in the appendix to the Flora of Australia from specimens collected near Gadgarra in 1988. The specific epithet (whiffiniana) honours "Dr. Trevor Whiffin...who has a long-standing interest in rainforest species".

== Distribution and habitat ==
This species of Cryptocarya grows in rainforest at altitudes from 520 to 720 m (1,710 to 2,360 ft) from the Lamb Range to the Gadgarra area in north Queensland.

== Conservation status ==
This species of Cryptocarya is listed as "of least concern" under the Queensland Government Nature Conservation Act 1992.
