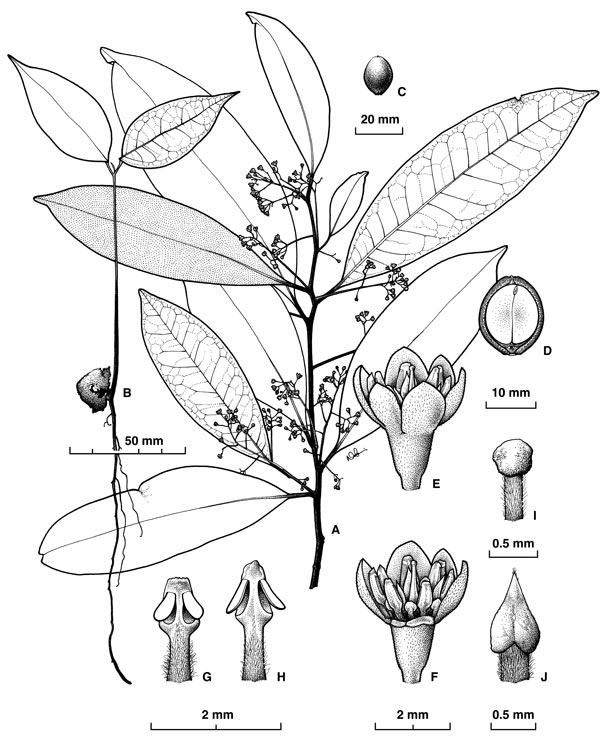

Conservation status
- Least Concern (IUCN 3.1)

Scientific classification
- Kingdom: Plantae
- Clade: Tracheophytes
- Clade: Angiosperms
- Clade: Magnoliids
- Order: Laurales
- Family: Lauraceae
- Genus: Cryptocarya
- Species: C. claudiana

Binomial name
- Cryptocarya claudiana B.Hyland

= Cryptocarya claudiana =

Species of tree

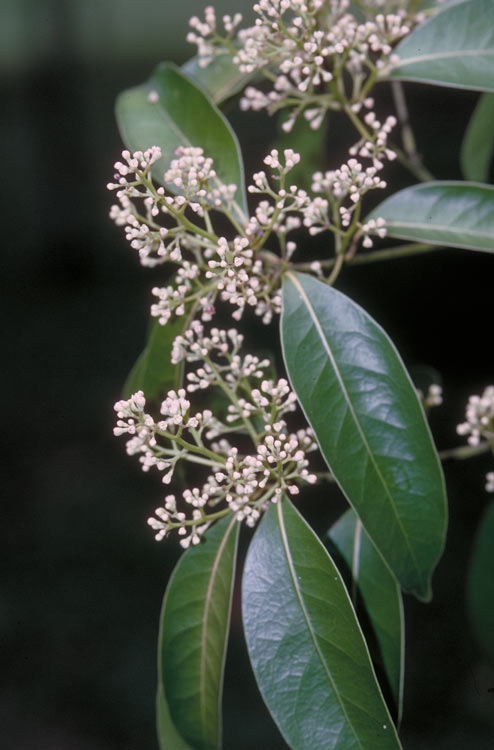
Leaves and panicles

Cryptocarya claudiana, commonly known as Claudie laurel, is a tree in the laurel family and is endemic to Cape York Peninsula in Queensland. Its leaves are oblong to elliptic, the flowers creamy-green, perfumed and tube-shaped, and the fruit an elliptic or spherical black drupe.

== Description ==
Cryptocarya claudiana is a tree that typically grows to a height of 10 m (33 ft), its stems not buttressed. Its leaves are oblong to elliptic, 85–160 mm (3.3–6.3 in) long and 30–65 mm (1.2–2.6 in) wide on a petiole 5–13 mm (0.20–0.51 in) long. The flowers are arranged in panicles that are shorter than the leaves and are perfumed, the perianth 1.2–1.3 mm (0.047–0.051 in) long an 1.3–1.5 mm (0.051–0.059 in) wide and hairy inside. The tepals are 1.6–1.8 mm (0.063–0.071 in) long and 1.2–1.4 mm (0.047–0.055 in) wide, the outer anthers about 0.7 mm (0.028 in) long and 0.5–0.6 mm (0.020–0.024 in) wide, the inner anthers 0.7–0.8 mm (0.028–0.031 in) long and about 0.5 mm (0.020 in) wide. Flowering occurs in January, and the fruit is an elliptic or spherical black drupe 14–16 mm (0.55–0.63 in) long and 11–13 mm (0.43–0.51 in) wide.

== Taxonomy ==
Cryptocarya claudiana was first formally described in 1989 by Bernard Hyland in Australian Systematic Botany from specimens collected near the Claudie River.

== Distribution and habitat ==
This species of Cryptocarya grows in rainforest on soils derived from granite and metamorphic rocks at elevations up to 500 m (1,600 ft) between the Claudie River and Rocky River, east of Coen on Cape York Peninsula.
