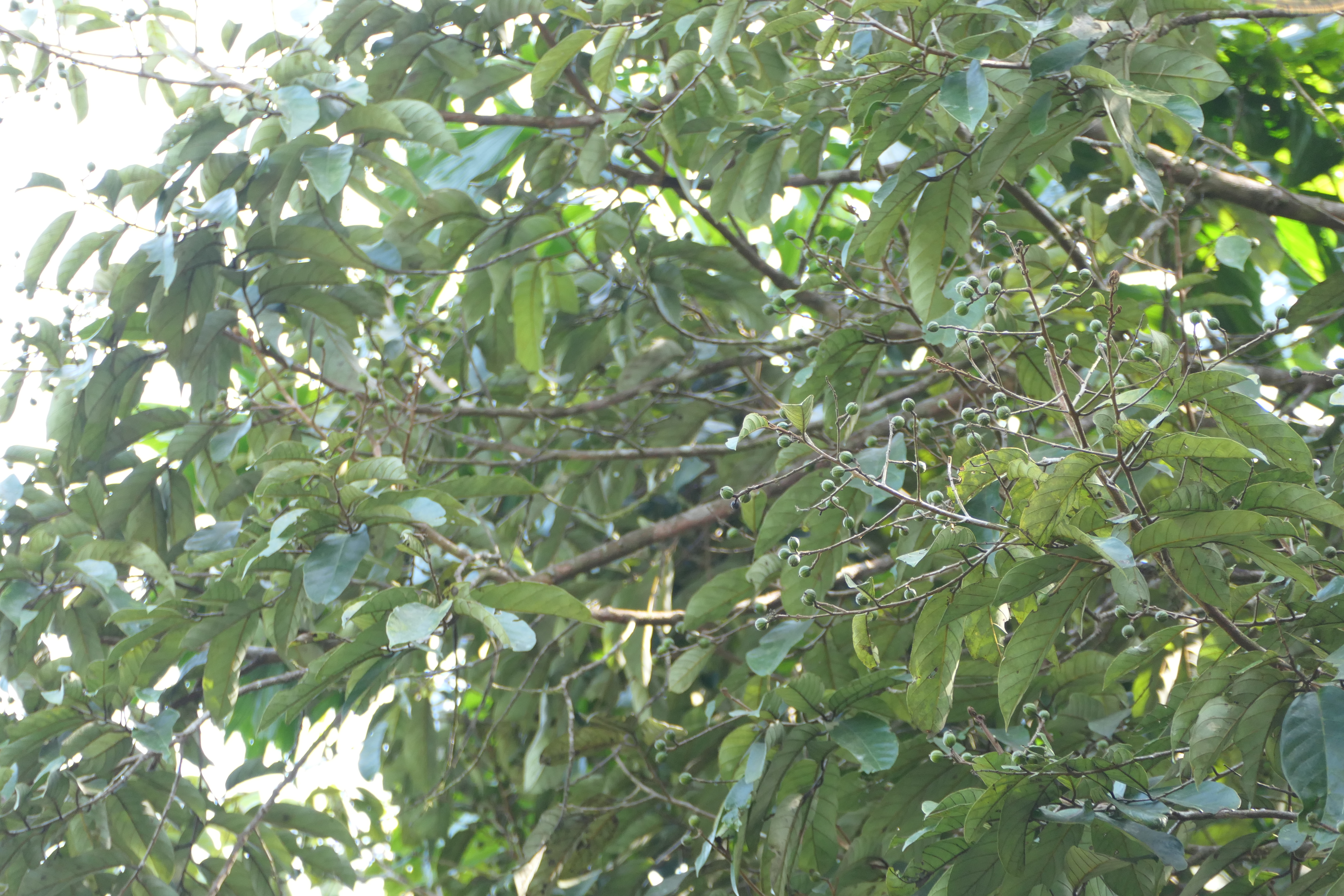

Conservation status
- Least Concern (IUCN 3.1)

Scientific classification
- Kingdom: Plantae
- Clade: Tracheophytes
- Clade: Angiosperms
- Clade: Magnoliids
- Order: Laurales
- Family: Lauraceae
- Genus: Cryptocarya
- Species: C. wightiana

Binomial name
- Cryptocarya wightiana Thwaites

Synonyms
- Cryptocarya bourdillonii Gamble.; Cryptocarya floribunda Wight, nom. illeg. homonym. post.; Cryptocarya wightiana var. lanceolata Meisn.; Cryptocarya wightiana var. parvifolia Meisn.

= Cryptocarya wightiana =

Species of flowering plant

Cryptocarya wightiana is a species of flowering plant in the family Lauraceae. It is a small tree or shrub native to southern India, Sri Lanka, the southern Andaman Islands, and Myanmar.

The species was described by George Henry Kendrick Thwaites in 1861.

== Fruits ==
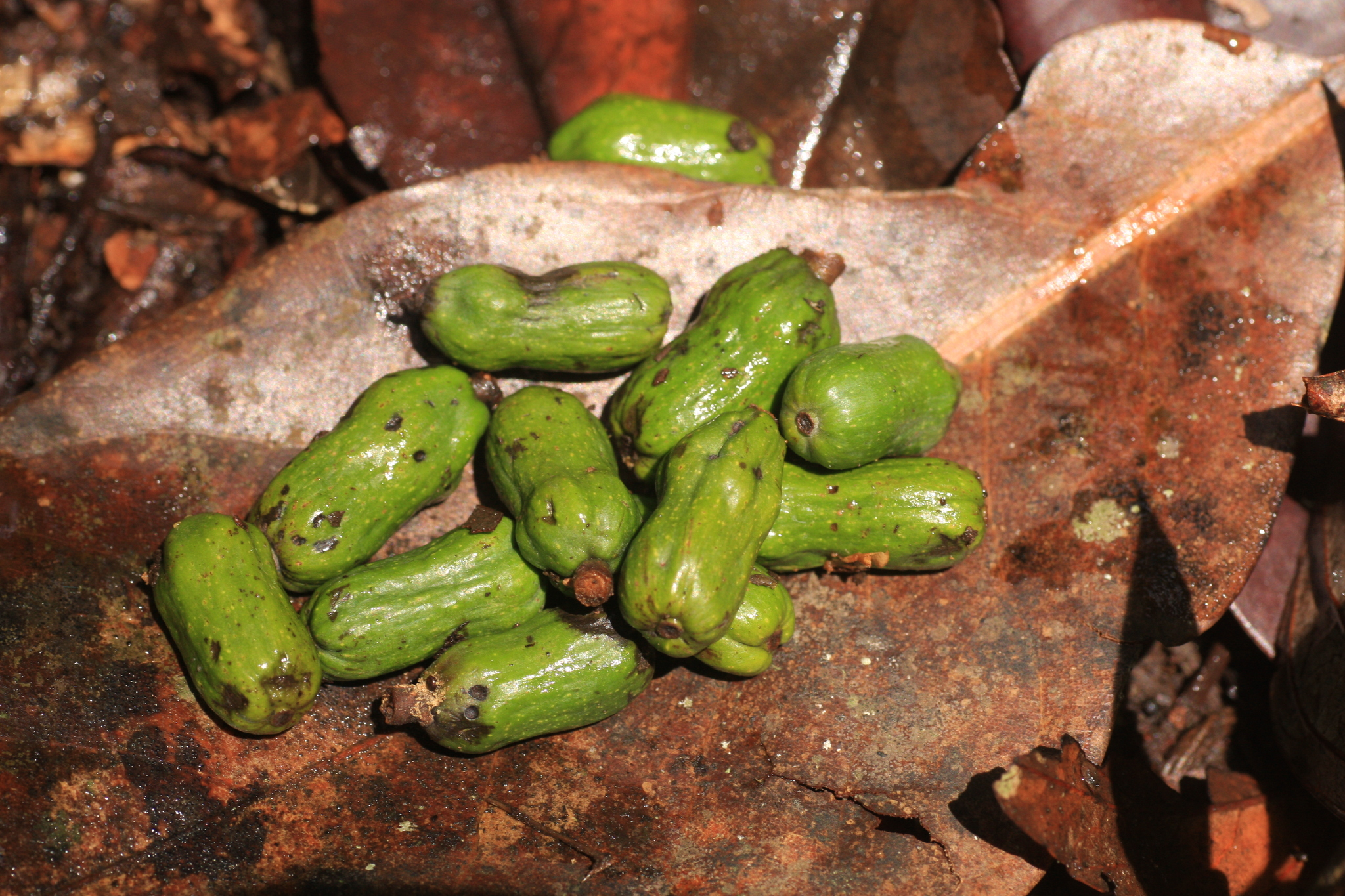
Cryptocarya wightiana drupes

Purplish black, globosa, smooth, shining drupe.

== Ecology ==
Rain forest subcanopy.

== Uses ==
Wood - rafters, construction.

== Culture ==
Known as "gulu mora" ( ගුලු මොර ) in Sinhala.
