= Cryptocarya elegans =

Conservation status
- Endangered (IUCN 3.1)

Scientific classification
- Kingdom: Plantae
- Clade: Tracheophytes
- Clade: Angiosperms
- Clade: Magnoliids
- Order: Laurales
- Family: Lauraceae
- Genus: Cryptocarya
- Species: C. elegans

Binomial name
- Cryptocarya elegans (Reinecke) A.C.Sm.

Synonyms
- Cinnamomum elegans Reinecke

Species of flowering plant

Cryptocarya elegans is a species of trees in the family Lauraceae. The species native range is the Samoa. This evergreen species can grow up to 20 meters tall, thriving in wet tropical forests at elevations reaching 700 meters. Its conservation status is endangered, primarily due to habitat loss.

== Morphology ==
- Leaves: Elliptical, 5–10 cm long, leathery with a slightly hairy underside. The base is acute to rounded, with an elongated apex. Petioles, also hairy, are 5–15 mm long.
- Flowers: Small (around 2 mm), arranged in dense panicles of 3–16 cm. The perianth varies from white to pink.
- Fruits: Nearly spherical, measuring 8–11 mm.

== Habitat and Distribution ==
Endemic to Samoa, this species is found in tropical wet forests, typically at altitudes below 700 meters.

== Taxonomy ==
Once classified as Cinnamomum elegans by Franz Reinecke, it was reclassified to its current name, Cryptocarya elegans by Albert Charles Smith in 1951.
