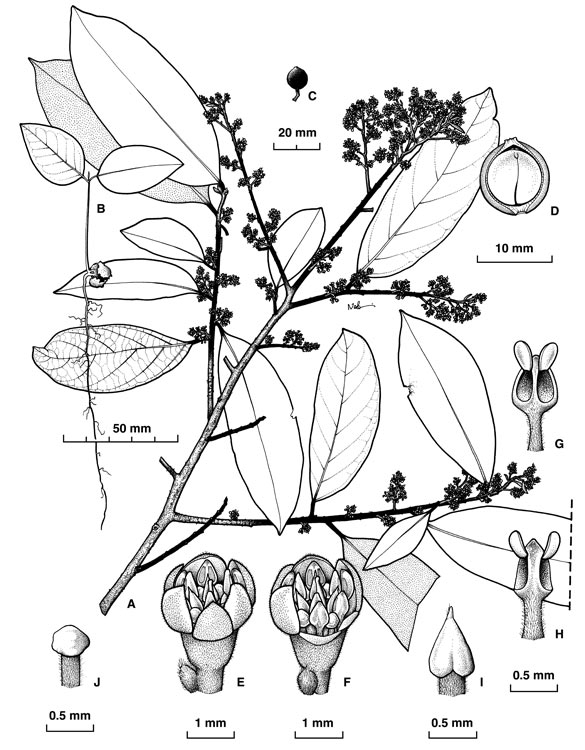

Conservation status
- Least Concern (IUCN 3.1)

Scientific classification
- Kingdom: Plantae
- Clade: Tracheophytes
- Clade: Angiosperms
- Clade: Magnoliids
- Order: Laurales
- Family: Lauraceae
- Genus: Cryptocarya
- Species: C. endiandrifolia

Binomial name
- Cryptocarya endiandrifolia Kosterm.

= Cryptocarya endiandrifolia =

Narrow-leaved walnut

Species of plant in the laurel family

Cryptocarya endiandrifolia, commonly known as narrow-leaved walnut, is a species of flowering plant in the family Lauraceae family and is native to Cape York Peninsula and New Guinea. Its leaves are elliptic to oblong or lance-shaped, the flowers cream-coloured or pale green and unpleasantly perfumed, and the fruit is a spherical to elliptic black drupe.

== Description ==
Cryptocarya endiandrifolia is a tree that typically grows to a height of 13 m (43 ft), its stems usually buttressed and its young growth softly hairy. Its leaves are elliptic to oblong or lance-shaped, 95–160 mm (3.7–6.3 in) long and 35–55 mm (1.4–2.2 in) wide on a petiole 7–13 mm (0.28–0.51 in) long. The flowers are cream-coloured or pale green and unpleasantly perfumed, usually arranged in a panicle longer than the leaves, the perianth tube 0.9–1.0 mm (0.035–0.039 in) long and 0.9–1.4 mm (0.035–0.055 in) wide and hairy near the tip. The tepals are 1.0–1.5 mm (0.039–0.059 in) long and 0.8–1.2 mm (0.031–0.047 in) wide, the outer anthers 0.5–0.6 mm (0.020–0.024 in) long and about 0.5 mm (0.020 in) wide, the inner anthers 0.5–0.7 mm (0.020–0.028 in) long and about 0.4 mm (0.016 in) wide. Flowering occurs in November and December, and the fruit is a black, spherical to elliptic drupe 10–13 mm (0.39–0.51 in) long and 8–11 mm (0.31–0.43 in) wide.

== Taxonomy ==
Cryptocarya endiandrifolia was first formally described in 1968 by André Joseph Guillaume Henri Kostermans in the journal Reinwardtia from specimens collected by Ruurd Dirk Hoogland near the foothills of the Finisterre Range.

== Distribution and habitat ==
Narrow-leaved walnut grows as an understorey tree in dry rainforest from near Bamaga to the McIlwraith Range on Cape York Peninsula and in New Guinea, at elevations from sea level to 150 m (490 ft).
