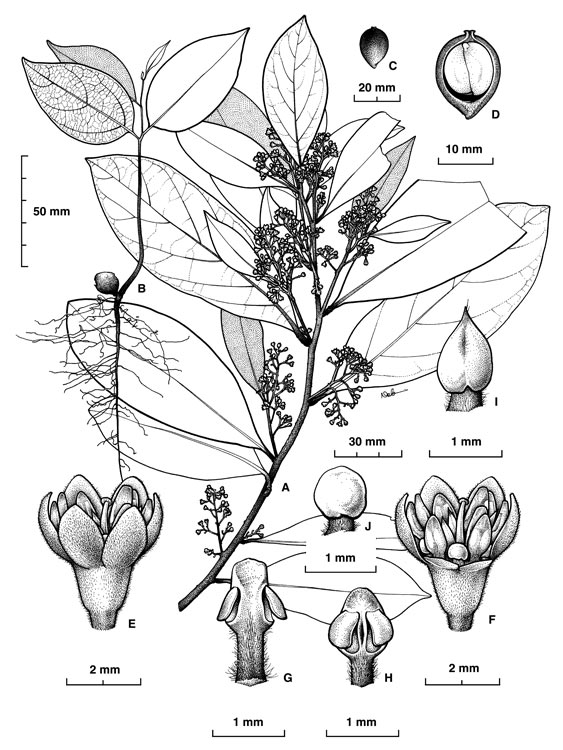

Conservation status
- Least Concern (IUCN 3.1)

Scientific classification
- Kingdom: Plantae
- Clade: Tracheophytes
- Clade: Angiosperms
- Clade: Magnoliids
- Order: Laurales
- Family: Lauraceae
- Genus: Cryptocarya
- Species: C. lividula

Binomial name
- Cryptocarya lividula B.Hyland

= Cryptocarya lividula =

Species of tree

Cryptocarya lividula, commonly known as blue laurel, is a species of flowering plant in the family Lauraceae and is endemic to north Queensland. It is a tree with lance-shaped to egg-shaped leaves, creamy green, unpleasantly perfumed flowers, and more or less spherical, purplish-black drupes.

== Description ==
Cryptocarya lividula is a tree that typically grows to a height of up to 25 m (82 ft), its stems usually buttressed. Its leaves are lance-shaped to egg-shaped, 60–93 mm (2.4–3.7 in) long and 19–40 mm (0.7–1.6 in) wide with a conspicuous, bluish sheen, on a petiole 4–8 mm (0.16–0.31 in) long. The flowers are arranged in panicles in leaf axils shorter than the leaves. They are creamy green and unpleasantly perfumed. The perianth tube is 0.8–1.6 mm (0.03–0.06 in) long, 1.4–1.9 mm (0.06–0.07 in) wide. The outer anthers are 0.7–1.0 mm (0.03–0.04 in) long and 0.6–0.7 mm (0.02–0.03 in) wide, the inner anthers 0.8–1.0 mm (0.03–0.04 in) long and 0.5–0.6 mm (0.02–0.02 in) wide. Flowering occurs from November to January, and the fruit is a purplish-black, more or less spherical drupe, 11.5–14 mm (0.5–0.6 in) long and wide with cream-coloured cotyledons.

== Taxonomy ==
Cryptocarya lividula was first formally described in 1989 by Bernard Hyland in Australian Systematic Botany from specimens collected in 1980. The specific epithet (lividula) means 'a dull, bluish grey'.

== Distribution and habitat ==
Cryptocarya lividula grows in rainforest between 180 and 1,000 m (590 and 3,280 ft) elevation, from Cooktown to Koombooloomba in north Queensland.

== Conservation status ==
This Cryptocarya is listed as of "least concern" under the Queensland Government Nature Conservation Act 1992.
