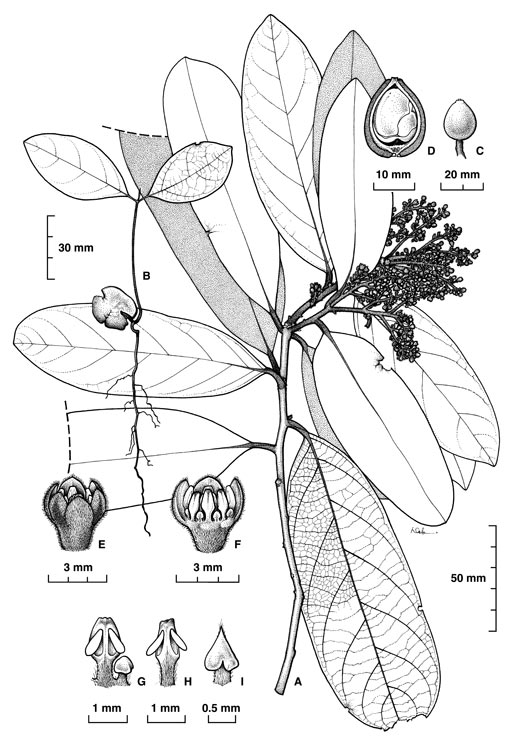
- Diagram of Cryptocarya putida

Conservation status
- Least Concern (IUCN 3.1)

Scientific classification
- Kingdom: Plantae
- Clade: Tracheophytes
- Clade: Angiosperms
- Clade: Magnoliids
- Order: Laurales
- Family: Lauraceae
- Genus: Cryptocarya
- Species: C. putida

Binomial name
- Cryptocarya putida B.Hyland

= Cryptocarya putida =

Species of tree

Cryptocarya putida is a species of flowering plant in the family Lauraceae and is endemic to Queensland. It is a tree with oblong to elliptic or narrowly egg-shaped leaves, brownish, creamy green, unpleasantly perfumed flowers, and oval, black to purplish drupes.

== Description ==
Cryptocarya pleurosperma is a tree that typically grows to a height of up to 30 m (98 ft), its stems usually buttressed. Its leaves are oblong to elliptic, to narrowly egg-shaped with the narrower end towards the base, 60–210 mm (2.4–8.3 in) long and 20–80 mm (0.8–3.1 in) wide, on a petiole 7–14 mm (0.28–0.55 in) long. The flowers are brownish, creamy green and unpleasantly perfumed, arranged in panicles about the same length as the leaves. The perianth tube is 1.1–1.6 mm (0.04–0.06 in) long and 1.4–1.8 mm (0.055–0.071 in) wide, the tepals 1.6–2.1 mm (0.063–0.083 in) long and 1.3–1.6 mm (0.051–0.063 in) wide. The outer anthers are 0.7–1.0 mm (0.03–0.04 in) long and 0.7–0.8 mm (0.028–0.031 in) wide, the inner anthers 0.8–1.2 mm (0.03–0.05 in) long and 0.5–0.7 mm (0.020–0.028 in) wide. Flowering occurs in November and December, and the fruit is an oval, black to purplish drupe, 14–20 mm (0.6–0.8 in) long and 12–15 mm (0.47–0.59 in) wide with yellowish cotyledons.

== Taxonomy ==
Cryptocarya putida was first formally described in 1989 by Bernard Hyland in Australian Systematic Botany from specimens collected in 1978.

== Distribution and habitat ==
This species of Cryptocarya grows as an understorey tree in rainforest from 600 to 1,100 m (2,000 to 3,600 ft) elevation, from the Clohesy River to near Townsville in north-east and central-eastern Queensland.

== Conservation status ==
This species of Cryptocarya is listed as "of least concern" under the Queensland Government Nature Conservation Act 1992.
