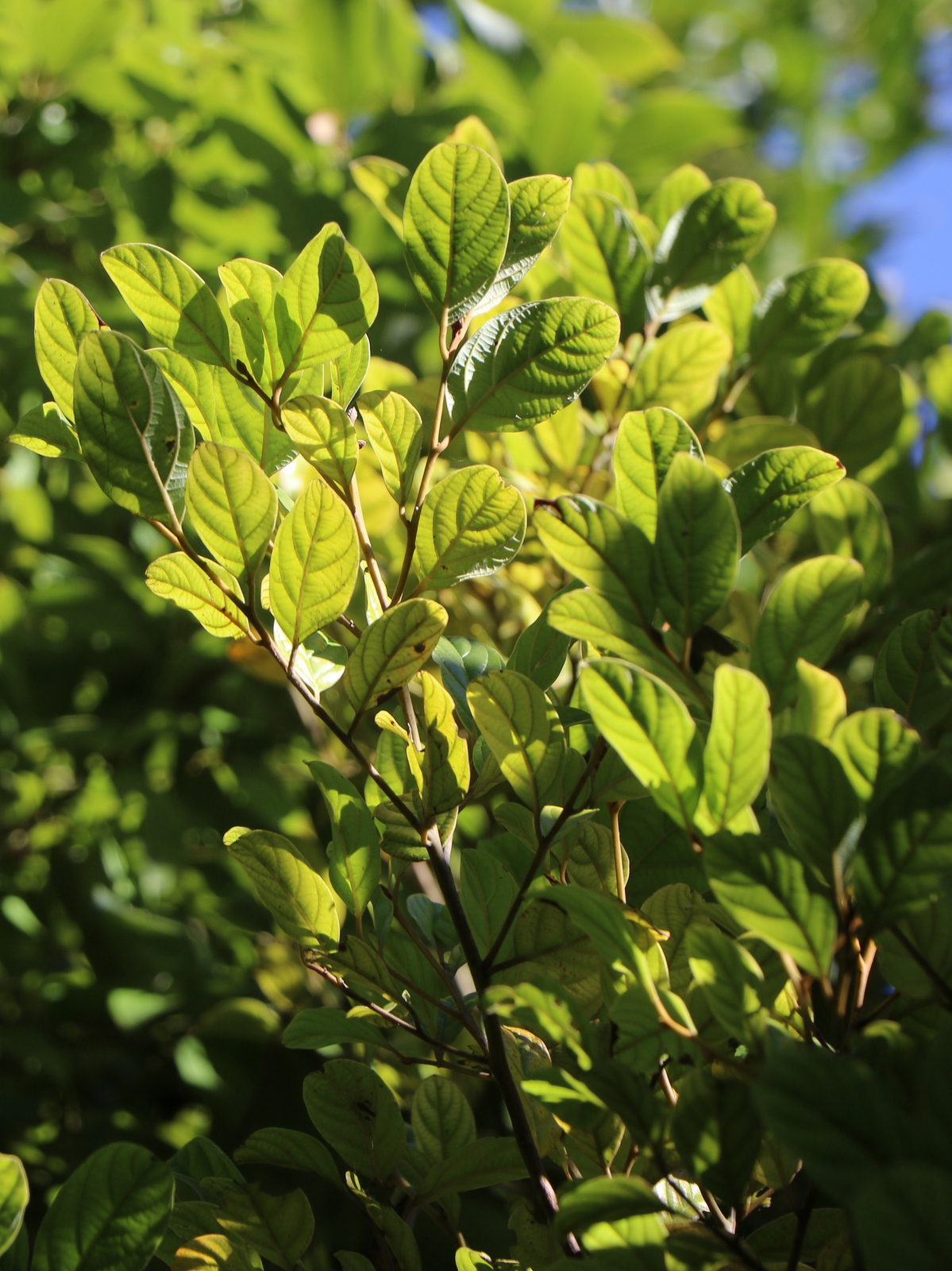

Conservation status
- Least Concern (IUCN 3.1)
- Least Concern (NCA)

Scientific classification
- Kingdom: Plantae
- Clade: Tracheophytes
- Clade: Angiosperms
- Clade: Magnoliids
- Order: Laurales
- Family: Lauraceae
- Genus: Cryptocarya
- Species: C. corrugata

Binomial name
- Cryptocarya corrugata C.T.White & W.D.Francis

= Cryptocarya corrugata =

Corduroy laurel

Species of plant in the laurel family

Cryptocarya corrugata, commonly known as corduroy laurel, oak walnut, acidwood or bull's breath, is a species of flowering plant in the laurel family and is endemic to north Queensland. It is a tree with egg-shaped to elliptic leaves, the flowers creamy-green, slightly perfumed and tube-shaped, and the fruit a spherical black to bluish-black drupe.

== Description ==
Cryptocarya corrugata is a tree that typically grows to a height of 35 m (115 ft), its stems sometimes buttressed, and its twigs more or less fluted and densely covered with twisted brown hairs. Its leaves are egg-shaped to elliptic, 35–110 mm (1.4–4.3 in) long and 20–55 mm (0.79–2.17 in) wide on a petiole 6–18 mm (0.24–0.71 in) long. The flowers are arranged in panicles usually shorter than the leaves, greenish-cream and more or less perfumed, the perianth tube 0.8–1.4 mm (0.031–0.055 in) long and 1.3–1.7 mm (0.051–0.067 in) wide. The tepals are 1.4–2.4 mm (0.055–0.094 in) long and 0.8–1.4 mm (0.031–0.055 in) wide. The outer anthers are 0.6–0.8 mm (0.024–0.031 in) long and 0.5–0.7 mm (0.020–0.028 in) wide, the inner anthers 0.6–0.9 mm (0.024–0.035 in) long and 0.4–0.5 mm (0.016–0.020 in) wide and hairy. Flowering occurs from November to January, and the fruit is a black to bluish-black drupe 15–22 mm (0.59–0.87 in) long and 22–34 mm (0.87–1.34 in) wide.

== Taxonomy ==
Cryptocarya corrugata was first described in 1926 by Cyril Tenison White and William Douglas Francis in the Proceedings of the Royal Society of Queensland from specimens collected by Francis in the Eungella Range in 1922.

== Distribution and habitat ==
Corduroy laurel grows in mountain rainforests at elevations from 350 to 1,200 m (1,150 to 3,940 ft) from Cooktown to Eungella in north-east and central-eastern Queensland.

== Ecology ==
The fruit is eaten by cassowaries and fruit pigeons.
