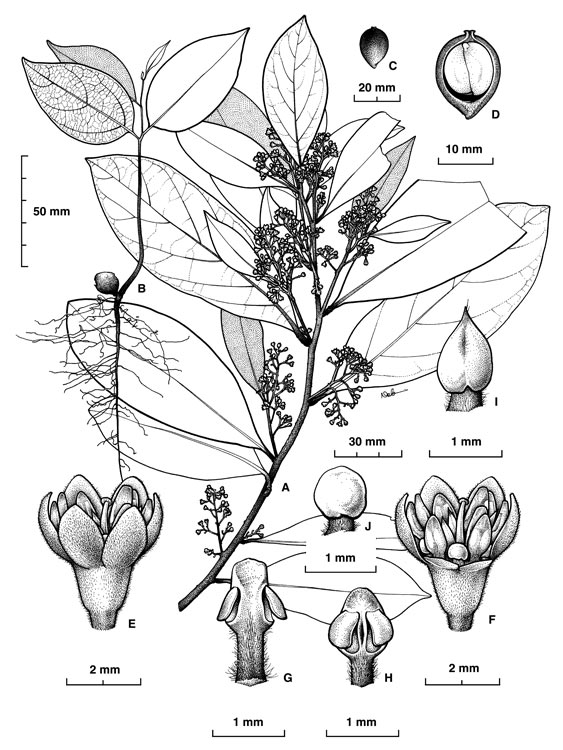

Conservation status
- Least Concern (IUCN 3.1)

Scientific classification
- Kingdom: Plantae
- Clade: Tracheophytes
- Clade: Angiosperms
- Clade: Magnoliids
- Order: Laurales
- Family: Lauraceae
- Genus: Cryptocarya
- Species: C. leucophylla

Binomial name
- Cryptocarya leucophylla B.Hyland

= Cryptocarya leucophylla =

Species of tree

Cryptocarya leucophylla, commonly known as northern laurel, is a species of flowering plant in the family Lauraceae and is endemic to Queensland. It is a tree with elliptic to egg-shaped leaves, creamy green, unpleasantly perfumed flowers, and elliptic to more or less spherical, black drupes.

== Description ==
Cryptocarya leucophylla is a tree that typically grows to a height of up to 25 m (82 ft), its stems buttressed. Its leaves are elliptic to egg-shaped, sometimes with the narrower end towards the base, 68–133 mm (2.7–5.2 in) long and 30–50 mm (1.2–2.0 in) wide on a petiole 6–12 mm (0.24–0.47 in) long. The flowers are arranged in panicles in leaf axils shorter or only slightly longer than the leaves. They are creamy green and unpleasantly perfumed. The perianth tube is 0.9–1.3 mm (0.04–0.05 in) long, 1.2–1.5 mm (0.05–0.06 in) wide. The outer anthers are 0.7–0.9 mm (0.03–0.04 in) long and 0.6–0.7 mm (0.02–0.03 in) wide, the inner anthers 0.8–0.9 mm (0.03–0.04 in) long and about 0.5 mm (0.02 in) wide. Flowering occurs from January to March, and the fruit is an elliptic to more or less spherical, black drupe, 13–18 mm (0.5–0.7 in) long and 12–13 mm (0.5–0.5 in) wide with yellowish cotyledons.

== Taxonomy ==
Cryptocarya leucophylla was first formally described in 1989 by Bernard Hyland in Australian Systematic Botany from specimens collected in 1985. The specific epithet (leucophylla) means 'white leaved'.

== Distribution and habitat ==
Cryptocarya leucophylla grows in mountain rainforest between 800 and 1,300 m (2,600 and 4,300 ft) elevation.

== Conservation status ==
This Cryptocarya is listed as of "least concern" under the Queensland Government Nature Conservation Act 1992.
