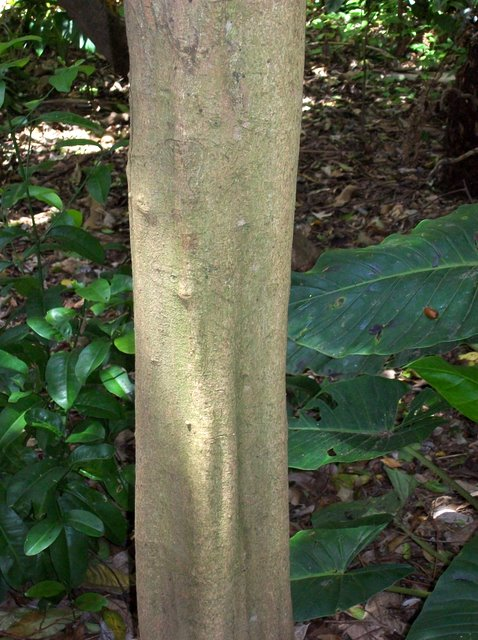
- Flanged trunk

Conservation status
- Least Concern (IUCN 3.1)

Scientific classification
- Kingdom: Plantae
- Clade: Tracheophytes
- Clade: Angiosperms
- Clade: Magnoliids
- Order: Laurales
- Family: Lauraceae
- Genus: Cryptocarya
- Species: C. bidwillii

Binomial name
- Cryptocarya bidwillii Meisn.

= Cryptocarya bidwillii =

Yellow laurel

Species of tree

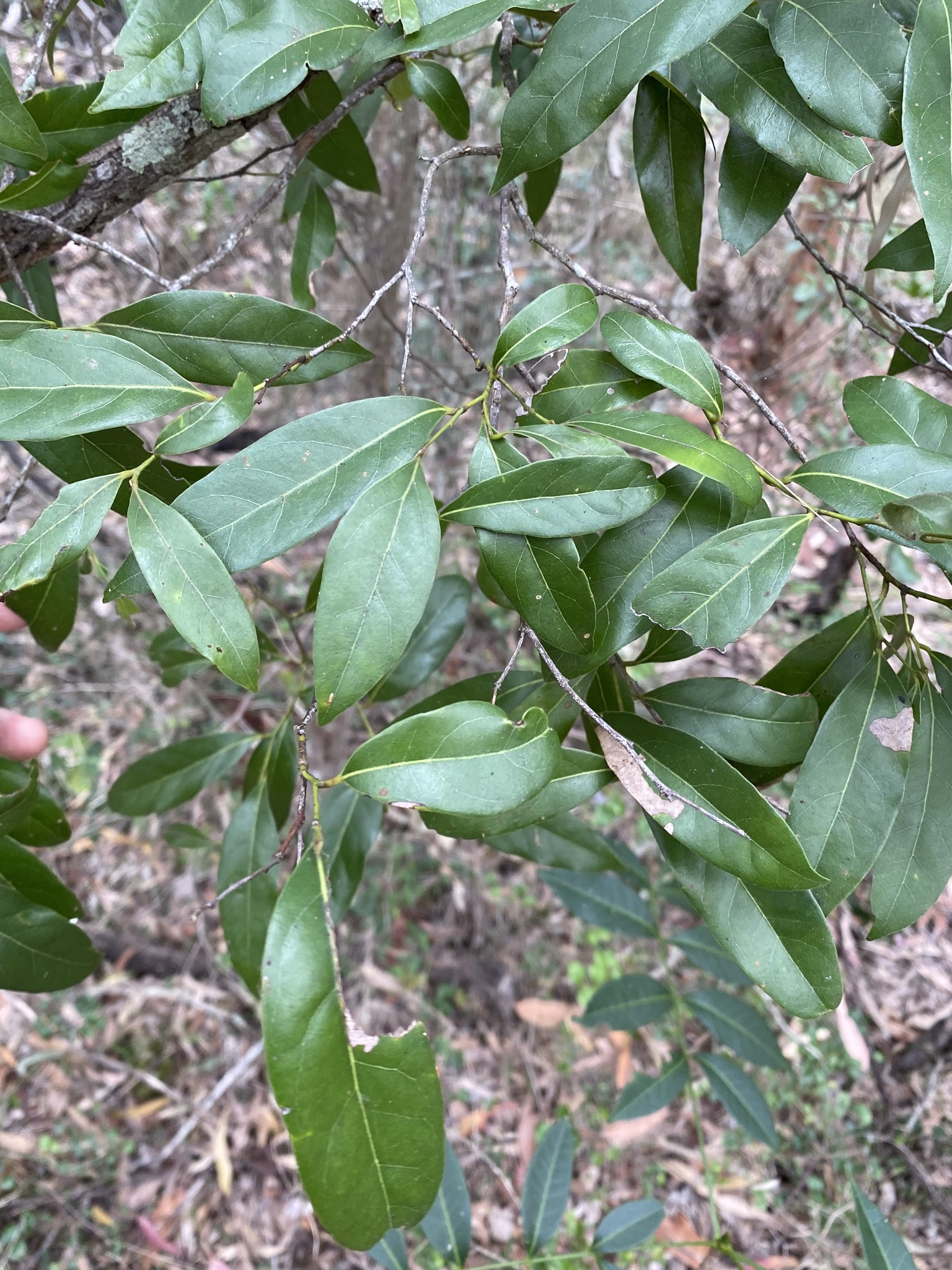
Leaves

Cryptocarya bidwillii, commonly known as yellow laurel, is a species of flowering plant in the laurel family and is endemic to eastern Australia. Its leaves are lance-shaped to elliptic, the flowers creamy-white and tube-shaped, and the fruit an elliptic black drupe.

== Description ==
Cryptocarya bidwillii is a tree that typically grows to a height of 20 m (66 ft), its stem usually not buttressed. Its leaves are lance-shaped to elliptic, 60–130 mm (2.4–5.1 in) long and 10–50 mm (0.39–1.97 in) wide on a petiole 3–10 mm (0.12–0.39 in) long. The leaves are glabrous, the upper surface green and shiny but the lower surface is paler. The flowers are creamy-white and arranged in panicles almost as long as the leaves. The tepals are 1.2–1.7 mm (0.047–0.067 in) long, the outer anthers 0.5–0.7 mm (0.020–0.028 in) long and 0.5–0.6 mm (0.020–0.024 in) wide, the inner anthers 0.7–0.8 mm (0.028–0.031 in) long and 0.4–0.5 mm (0.016–0.020 in) wide. Flowering occurs in December, and the fruit is an elliptic black drupe 11–16 mm (0.43–0.63 in) long and 8–12.5 mm (0.31–0.49 in) wide.

== Taxonomy ==
Cryptocarya bidwillii was first formally described in 1864 by Carl Meissner in de Candolle's Prodromus Systematis Naturalis Regni Vegetabilis from specimens collected by John Carne Bidwill near Wide Bay.

== Distribution and habitat ==
Yellow laurel grows in seasonal rainforest at elevations up to 1,100 m (3,600 ft), between near Mackay in north Queensland and near Grafton in New South Wales.
