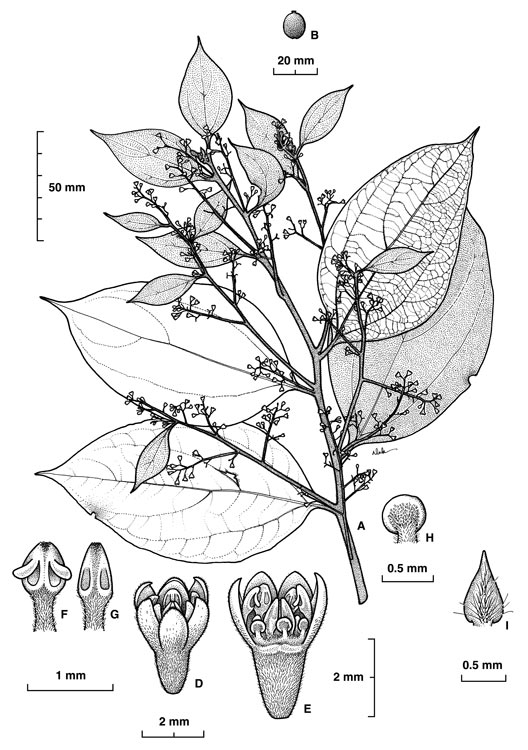

Scientific classification
- Kingdom: Plantae
- Clade: Tracheophytes
- Clade: Angiosperms
- Clade: Magnoliids
- Order: Laurales
- Family: Lauraceae
- Genus: Cryptocarya
- Species: C. burckiana

Binomial name
- Cryptocarya burckiana Warb.

= Cryptocarya burckiana =

Species of tree

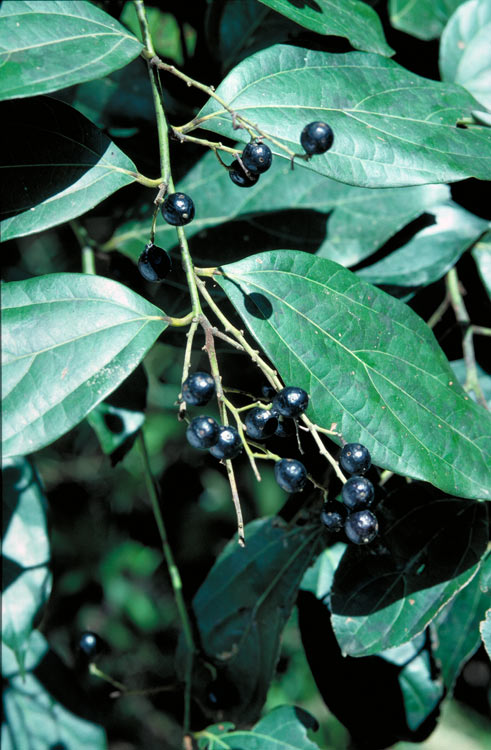
Drupes

Cryptocarya burckiana is a tree in the laurel family and is native to Cape York Peninsula in Queensland and to Malesia. Its leaves are lance-shaped to elliptic, the flowers cream-coloured and tube-shaped, and the fruit a spherical black drupe.

== Description ==
Cryptocarya burckiana is a tree that typically grows to a height of 10 m (33 ft), its stems sometimes buttressed. Its leaves are lance-shaped to elliptic, 105–165 mm (4.1–6.5 in) long and 45–80 mm (1.8–3.1 in) wide on a petiole 6–13 mm (0.24–0.51 in) long. The flowers are usually arranged in panicles and are not perfumed. The tepals are 1.1–1.9 mm (0.043–0.075 in) long and 0.8–1.3 mm (0.031–0.051 in) wide, the outer anthers 0.5–0.6 mm (0.020–0.024 in) long and wide, the inner anthers 0.5–0.7 mm (0.020–0.028 in) long and 0.4–0.5 mm (0.016–0.020 in) wide. Flowering occurs from November to January, and the fruit is a spherical black drupe 13–15 mm (0.51–0.59 in) long and 11–13 mm (0.43–0.51 in) wide.

== Taxonomy ==
Cryptocarya burckiana was first formally described in 1891 by Otto Warburg in Botanische Jahrbücher für Systematik, Pflanzengeschichte und Pflanzengeographie. The specific epithet (burckiana) honours William Burck.

== Distribution and habitat ==
This species of Cryptocarya grows in lowland rainforest and gallery forest at altitudes up to 100 m (330 ft) and is found on Cape York Peninsula in far north Queensland and in the Kai islands in Indonesia.
