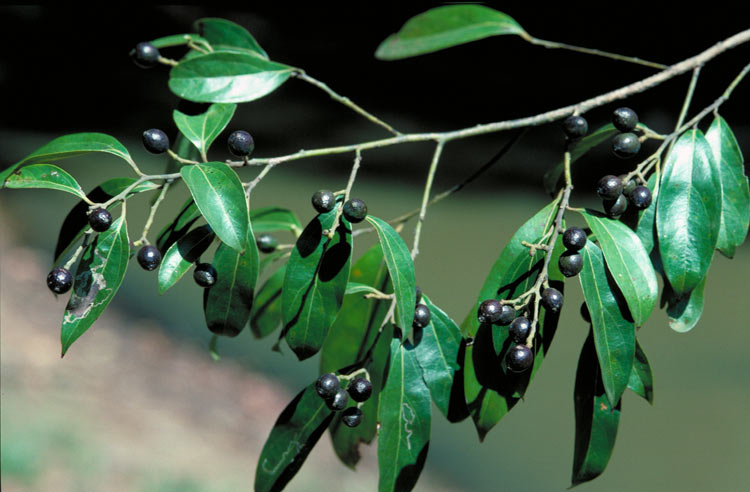

Conservation status
- Least Concern (IUCN 3.1)

Scientific classification
- Kingdom: Plantae
- Clade: Tracheophytes
- Clade: Angiosperms
- Clade: Magnoliids
- Order: Laurales
- Family: Lauraceae
- Genus: Cryptocarya
- Species: C. exfoliata

Binomial name
- Cryptocarya exfoliata C.K.Allen

= Cryptocarya exfoliata =

Species of plant in the laurel family

Cryptocarya exfoliata is a species of flowering plant in the family Lauraceae. It is a tree native to Cape York Peninsula of Queensland, the Northern Territory, and New Guinea. Its leaves are lance-shaped, the flowers creamy-green and slightly perfumed, and the fruit is a spherical to elliptic black drupe.

== Description ==
Cryptocarya exfoliata is a tree that typically grows to a height of up to 20 m (66 ft), its stems sometimes buttressed and its young growth softly hairy. Its leaves are lance-shaped, 950–130 mm (37.4–5.1 in) long and 15–55 mm (0.59–2.17 in) wide on a petiole 3–11 mm (0.12–0.43 in) long. The flowers are creamy-green and slightly perfumed, usually arranged in a panicle more or less the same length as the leaves, the perianth tube 1.0–1.4 mm (0.039–0.055 in) long, 1.3–1.5 mm (0.051–0.059 in) wide and hairy. The tepals are 1.7–2.1 mm (0.067–0.083 in) long and 1.2–1.5 mm (0.047–0.059 in) wide, the outer anthers 0.7–0.9 mm (0.028–0.035 in) long and 0.5–0.6 mm (0.020–0.024 in) wide, the inner anthers 0.9–1.0 mm (0.035–0.039 in) long and 0.4–0.5 mm (0.016–0.020 in) wide. Flowering occurs from January to March, and the fruit is a black, spherical to elliptic drupe 10–13 mm (0.39–0.51 in) long and 9–11 mm (0.35–0.43 in) wide.

== Taxonomy ==
Cryptocarya exfoliata was first formally described in 1942 by Caroline Kathryn Allen in the Journal of the Arnold Arboretum from specimens collected by Leonard John Brass near the Middle Fly River in New Guinea.

== Distribution and habitat ==
This species of Cryptocarya grows in rainforest in New Guinea, Arnhem Land, the Torres Strait Islands, and from Cape York Peninsula to Cairns in Queensland, at elevations from sea level to 450 m (1,480 ft).
