= Cryptocarya depressa =

Conservation status
- Least Concern (IUCN 3.1)

Scientific classification
- Kingdom: Plantae
- Clade: Tracheophytes
- Clade: Angiosperms
- Clade: Magnoliids
- Order: Laurales
- Family: Lauraceae
- Genus: Cryptocarya
- Species: C. depressa

Binomial name
- Cryptocarya depressa Warb.

Species of plant in the laurel family

Cryptocarya depressa, is a tree in the laurel family. It is native to the Bismarck Archipelago of Papua New Guinea and the Solomon Islands.
