= Cryptocarya nitens =

Conservation status
- Least Concern (IUCN 3.1)

Scientific classification
- Kingdom: Plantae
- Clade: Tracheophytes
- Clade: Angiosperms
- Clade: Magnoliids
- Order: Laurales
- Family: Lauraceae
- Genus: Cryptocarya
- Species: C. nitens

Binomial name
- Cryptocarya nitens (Blume) Koord. & Valeton

Synonyms
- Cryptocarya nativitatis Rendle; Tetranthera nitens Blume

Species of flowering plant

Cryptocarya nitens is a species of flowering plant in the family Lauraceae and is endemic to Southeast Asia. It is a tree with elliptic to lance-shaped or egg-shaped leaves, greenish-white flowers, and shining purplish-black drupes.

== Description ==
Cryptocarya nitens is a tree that typically grows to a height of 8–30 m (26–98 ft) and a dbh of 15–30 cm (5.9–11.8 in), its branchlets covered with soft, rust-coloured hairs. Its leaves are arranged alternately, leathery, elliptic to oblong or egg-shaped, mostly 75–230 mm (3.0–9.1 in) long, 35–105 mm (1.4–4.1 in) wide on a petiole 10–30 mm (0.39–1.18 in) long. Both surfaces of the leaves are glabrous, sometimes with hairs on the larger veins. The flowers are arranged in panicles in leaf axils and on the ends of branchlets. They are sessile and greenish-white and covered with soft, rust-coloured hairs. The floral tube is bell-shaped, about 2 mm (0.08 in) long, the perianth segments elliptic to lance-shaped and 1.3–1.8 mm (0.051–0.071 in) long but fall off early. The stamen are 1.2–1.6 mm (0.05–0.06 in) long, hairy with a bright yellow anther. Flowering occurs from March to October, and the fruit is a spherical, shining black drupe, 8–16 mm (0.3–0.6 in) in diameter containing a single seed.

== Taxonomy ==
This species was first formally described in 1851 by Carl Ludwig Blume whio gave it the name Tetranthera nitens in his Museum Botanicum Lugduno-Batavum sive stirpium Exoticarum, Novarum vel Minus Cognitarum ex Vivis aut Siccis Brevis Expositio et Descriptio. In 1904, Sijfert Hendrik Koorders and Theodoric Valeton transferred the species to Cryptocarya as C. nitens in the journal Mededeelingen Uit's Lands Platentuin. The specific epithet (nitens) means "to shine", referring to the glossy green leaves of this species.

== Distribution and habitat ==
This species of Cryptocarya grows on riversides on open hill to lowland forest up to 250 m (820 ft) elevation in Southern Thailand, Peninsular Malaysia, Singapore, Sumatra, Java and Christmas Island in Australia.

== Ecology ==
Cryptocarya nitens is an important food for pigeons.
