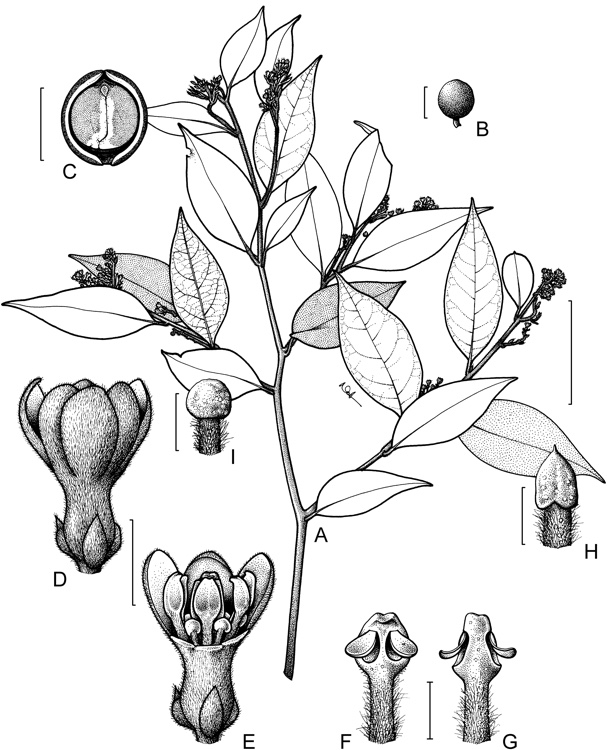

Scientific classification
- Kingdom: Plantae
- Clade: Tracheophytes
- Clade: Angiosperms
- Clade: Magnoliids
- Order: Laurales
- Family: Lauraceae
- Genus: Cryptocarya
- Species: C. dorrigoensis

Binomial name
- Cryptocarya dorrigoensis Frodin ex B.Hyland & A.G.Floyd

= Cryptocarya dorrigoensis =

Dorrigo laurel

Species of plant in the laurel family

Cryptocarya dorrigoensis, commonly known as Dorrigo laurel, is a species of flowering plant in the laurel family and is native to northern New South Wales. It is a tree with lance-shaped leaves, the flowers greenish-cream to creamy-yellow but not perfumed, and the fruit is a spherical to elliptic, black to bluish-black drupe.

== Description ==
Cryptocarya dorrigoensis is a tree that typically grows to a height of 20 m (66 ft), its stems not buttressed but its young growth densely hairy. Its leaves are lance-shaped, egg-shaped to elliptic, 36–59 mm (1.4–2.3 in) long and 17–20 mm (0.67–0.79 in) wide on a petiole 4–5 mm (0.16–0.20 in) long. The flowers are greenish-cream to creamy-yellow, usually arranged in a raceme less than the leaves but not perfumed, the perianth tube 2.5 mm (0.098 in) long and 1.4 mm (0.055 in) wide and hairy inside. The tepals are 1.6–1.8 mm (0.063–0.071 in) long and 1.3–1.4 mm (0.051–0.055 in) wide, the outer anthers 0.6 mm (0.024 in) long and about 0.4 mm (0.016 in) wide, the inner anthers 0.8 mm (0.031 in) long and about 0.5 mm (0.020 in) wide. Flowering occurs from May to November, and the fruit is a black to bluish-black, spherical to elliptic drupe 16 mm (0.63 in) long and 14–14.5 mm (0.55–0.57 in) wide.

== Taxonomy ==
Cryptocarya dorrigoensis was first formally described in 1989 by Bernard Patrick Matthew Hyland in Australian Systematic Botany from specimens collected by Cyril Tenison White near Dorrigo in 1930.

== Distribution and habitat ==
Dorrigo laurel grows in mountain rainforest from near Coffs Harbour to Point Lookout at altitudes of 600–1,000 m (2,000–3,300 ft).
