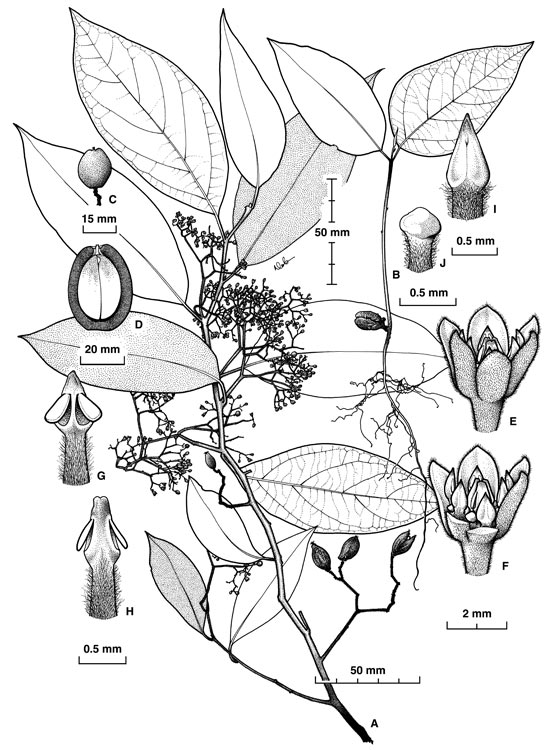
- Diagram of Cryptocarya rhodosperma

Conservation status
- Least Concern (IUCN 3.1)

Scientific classification
- Kingdom: Plantae
- Clade: Tracheophytes
- Clade: Angiosperms
- Clade: Magnoliids
- Order: Laurales
- Family: Lauraceae
- Genus: Cryptocarya
- Species: C. rhodosperma

Binomial name
- Cryptocarya rhodosperma B.Hyland

= Cryptocarya rhodosperma =

Species of tree

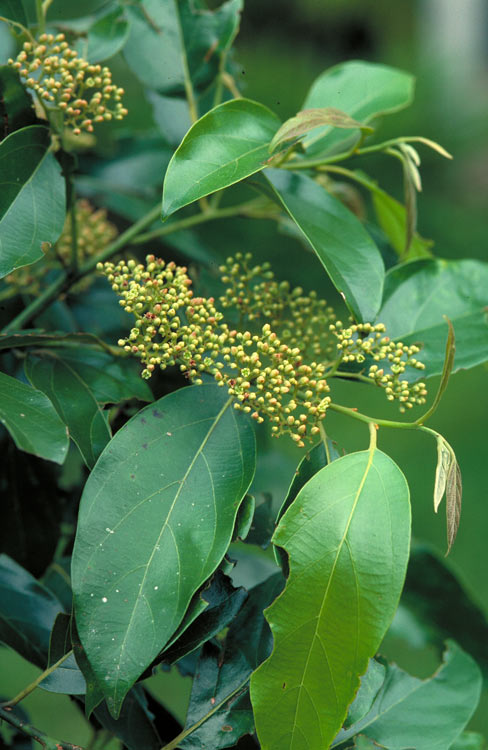
Foliage and flowers

Cryptocarya rhodosperma is a species of flowering plant in the family Lauraceae and is endemic to Queensland. It is a tree with lance-shaped to elliptic leaves, greenish, perfumed flowers, and elliptic, black drupes.

== Description ==
Cryptocarya rhodosperma is a tree that typically grows to a height of up to 25 m (82 ft), its stems usually buttressed. Its leaves are lance-shaped to elliptic, 80–145 mm (3.1–5.7 in) long and 30–80 mm (1.2–3.1 in) wide, on a petiole 8–16 mm (0.31–0.63 in) long. The flowers are greenish, faintly and possibly unpleasantly perfumed, arranged in panicles about the same length or slightly longer than the leaves. The perianth tube is 0.8–1.1 mm (0.03–0.04 in) long and 1.2–1.9 mm (0.047–0.075 in) wide, the tepals 1.5–2.1 mm (0.059–0.083 in) long and 1.0–1.2 mm (0.039–0.047 in) wide. The outer anthers are 0.6–0.8 mm (0.02–0.03 in) long and 0.4–0.6 mm (0.016–0.024 in) wide, the inner anthers 0.7–0.8 mm (0.03–0.03 in) long and 0.4–0.5 mm (0.016–0.020 in) wide. Flowering occurs from January to May, and the fruit is an elliptic, black drupe, 16–27 mm (0.6–1.1 in) long and 9.5–16.5 mm (0.37–0.65 in) wide with pink cotyledons.

== Taxonomy ==
Cryptocarya rhodosperma was first formally described in 1989 by Bernard Hyland in Australian Systematic Botany from specimens collected in 1983.

== Distribution and habitat ==
This species of Cryptocarya grows as an understorey tree in rainforest from 40 and 120 m (130 and 390 ft) elevation, from Lockerbie to Goldsborough in north-east Queensland and Cape York Peninsula.

== Conservation status ==
This species of Cryptocarya is listed as "of least concern" under the Queensland Government Nature Conservation Act 1992.
