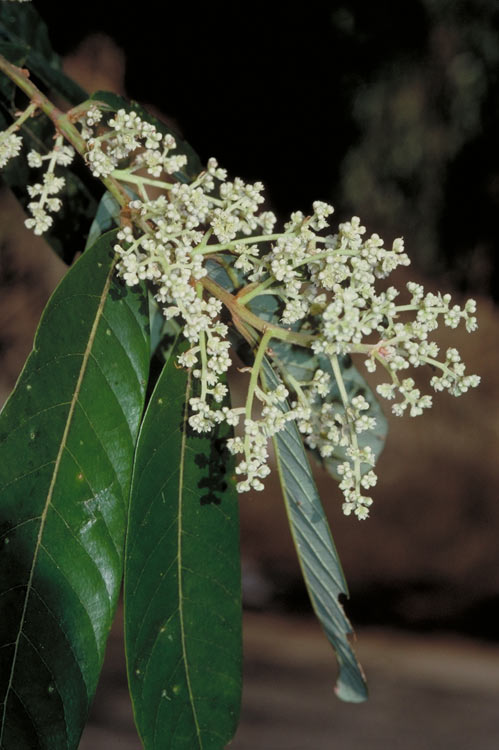
- Leaves and flowers

Conservation status
- Least Concern (IUCN 3.1)

Scientific classification
- Kingdom: Plantae
- Clade: Tracheophytes
- Clade: Angiosperms
- Clade: Magnoliids
- Order: Laurales
- Family: Lauraceae
- Genus: Cryptocarya
- Species: C. murrayi

Binomial name
- Cryptocarya murrayi F.Muell.

= Cryptocarya murrayi =

Species of flowering plant

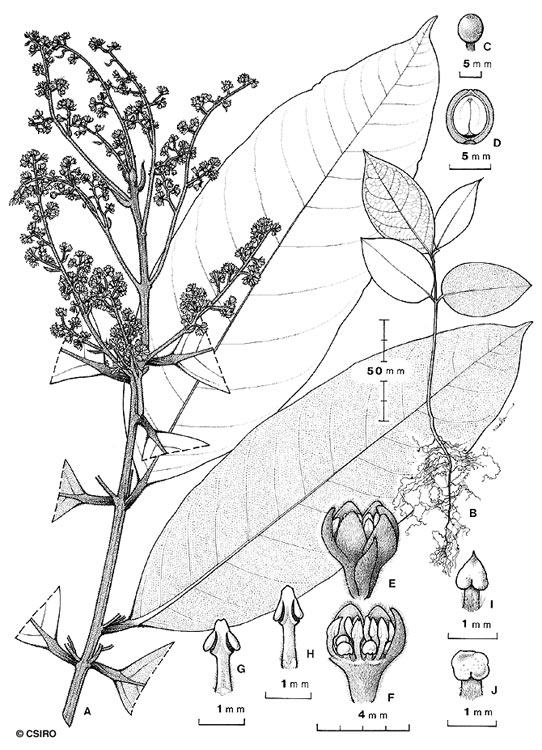
Illustration

Cryptocarya murrayi commonly known as Murray's laurel, is a species of flowering plant in the family Lauraceae and is endemic to north Queensland. It is a tree with elliptic to oval to oblong leaves, cream-coloured, unpleasantly perfumed flowers, and elliptic to spherical black drupes.

== Description ==
Cryptocarya murrayi is a tree that typically grows to a height of up to 30 m (98 ft), its stems buttressed and twigs hairy. Its leaves are elliptic to oval to oblong 115–300 mm (4.5–11.8 in) long, 45–105 mm (1.8–4.1 in) wide and glaucous on the lower surface, on a petiole 8–19 mm (0.31–0.75 in) long. The flowers are arranged in panicles in leaf axils and are longer than the leaves. They are cream-coloured and unpleasantly perfumed. The perianth tube is 0.8–1.9 mm (0.03–0.07 in) long, 1.5–2.1 mm (0.06–0.08 in) wide. The outer anthers are 0.6–0.8 mm (0.02–0.03 in) long and 0.5–0.7 mm (0.02–0.03 in) wide, the inner anthers 0.6–0.9 mm (0.02–0.04 in) long and 0.5–0.7 mm (0.02–0.03 in) wide. Flowering occurs from December to July, and the fruit is an elliptical to spherical black drupe, 13–18 mm (0.5–0.7 in) long and 12–15 mm (0.47–0.59 in) wide with creamy cotyledons.

== Taxonomy ==
Cryptocarya murrayi was first formally described in 1866 by Ferdinand von Mueller in his Fragmenta phytographiae Australiae from specimens collected near Rockingham Bay by John Dallachy.

== Distribution and habitat ==
This species of Cryptocarya grows in rainforest from sea level to 750 m (2,460 ft) altitude between Cooktown in north-east Queensland and Mackay in central-eastern Queensland.

== Conservation status ==
Cryptocarya murrayi is listed as "least concern" by the Queensland Government Department of Education and Science.
