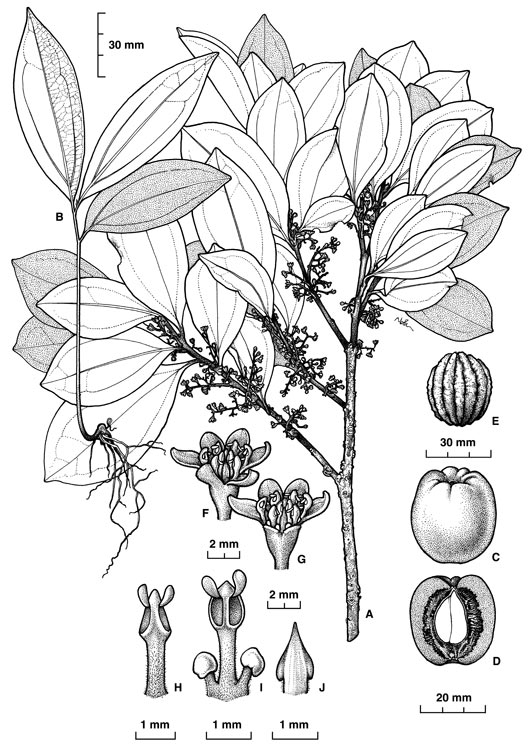
- Diagram of Cryptocarya pleurosperma

Conservation status
- Least Concern (IUCN 3.1)

Scientific classification
- Kingdom: Plantae
- Clade: Tracheophytes
- Clade: Angiosperms
- Clade: Magnoliids
- Order: Laurales
- Family: Lauraceae
- Genus: Cryptocarya
- Species: C. pleurosperma

Binomial name
- Cryptocarya pleurosperma C.T.White & W.D.Francis

= Cryptocarya pleurosperma =

Species of tree

Cryptocarya pleurosperma, commonly known as poison walnut or poison laurel, is a species of flowering plant in the family Lauraceae and is endemic to north-east Queensland. It is a tree with oblong to elliptic leaves, cream coloured, perfumed flowers, and usually spherical, ribbed, red drupes.

== Description ==
Cryptocarya pleurosperma is a tree that typically grows to a height of up to 30 m (98 ft), its stems sometimes buttressed. Its leaves are oblong to elliptic, 72–160 mm (2.8–6.3 in) long and 35–70 mm (1.4–2.8 in) wide, on a petiole 5–11 mm (0.20–0.43 in) long. The flowers cream-coloured and perfumed, arranged in panicles or reduced to a raceme in leaf axils shorter than the leaves. The perianth tube is 1.2–1.6 mm (0.05–0.06 in) long and 1.0–1.6 mm (0.039–0.063 in) wide, the tepals 1.7–2.9 mm (0.067–0.114 in) long and 1.0–1.6 mm (0.039–0.063 in) wide. The outer anthers are 0.6–0.8 mm (0.02–0.03 in) long and wide, the inner anthers glabrous, 0.8–0.9 mm (0.03–0.04 in) long and 0.5–0.6 mm (0.020–0.024 in) wide. Flowering occurs from January to March, and the fruit is usually a spherical, ribbed, red drupe, 41–62 mm (1.6–2.4 in) long and 27–49 mm (1.1–1.9 in) wide with cream-coloured cotyledons.

== Taxonomy ==
Cryptocarya pleurosperma was first formally described in 1924 by Cyril Tenison White and William Douglas Francis in Proceedings of the Royal Society of Queensland from specimens collected by White on Mount Bellenden Ker.

== Distribution and habitat ==
Poison walnut grows in rainforest from sea level to 700 m (2,300 ft) elevation, from near the Bloomfield River to near Palmerston in north-east Queensland.

== Conservation status ==
This species of Cryptocarya is listed as "of least concern" under the Queensland Government Nature Conservation Act 1992.
