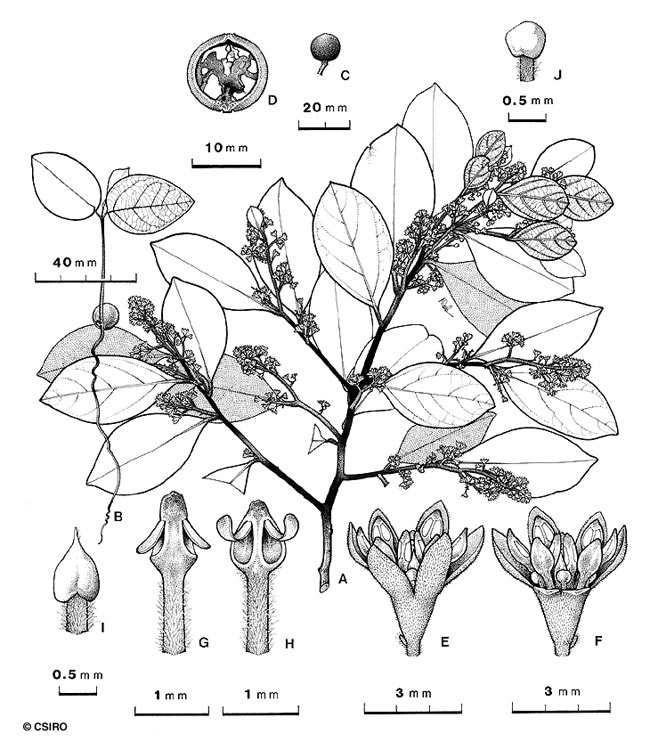

Conservation status
- Least Concern (IUCN 3.1)

Scientific classification
- Kingdom: Plantae
- Clade: Tracheophytes
- Clade: Angiosperms
- Clade: Magnoliids
- Order: Laurales
- Family: Lauraceae
- Genus: Cryptocarya
- Species: C. bellendenkerana

Binomial name
- Cryptocarya bellendenkerana B.Hyland

= Cryptocarya bellendenkerana =

Species of tree

Cryptocarya bellendenkerana is a tree in the laurel family and is endemic to North Queensland. Its leaves are lance-shaped to egg-shaped, the flowers creamy-green and tube-shaped, and the fruit a spherical black drupe.

== Description ==
Cryptocarya bellendenkerana is a rainforest tree that typically grows to a height of 25 m (82 ft), its stems sometimes buttressed. Its leaves are lance-shaped to egg-shaped, 25–54 mm (0.98–2.13 in) long and 16–32 mm (0.63–1.26 in) wide on a petiole 4–7 mm (0.16–0.28 in) long. The flowers are arranged in panicles shorter than the leaves and sometimes have an unpleasant odour. The tepals are 1.7–2.2 mm (0.067–0.087 in) long, the outer anthers 0.7–0.8 mm (0.028–0.031 in) long and 1.1–1.6 mm (0.043–0.063 in) wide, the inner anthers 0.7–0.9 mm (0.028–0.035 in) long and 0.5–0.6 mm (0.020–0.024 in) wide. Flowering mostly occurs from September to January, and the fruit is a spherical black drupe 10–11 mm (0.39–0.43 in) long and 11–12.5 mm (0.43–0.49 in) wide.

== Taxonomy ==
Cryptocarya bellendenkerana was first formally described in 1989 by Bernard Hyland in Australian Systematic Botany, from specimens collected by Hyland collected in 1982.

== Distribution and habitat ==
This species of Cryptocarya grows in mountain rainforest from south of Cooktown to Mount Bartle Frere in north Queensland, at elevations between 1,100 and 1,500 m (3,600 and 4,900 ft).
