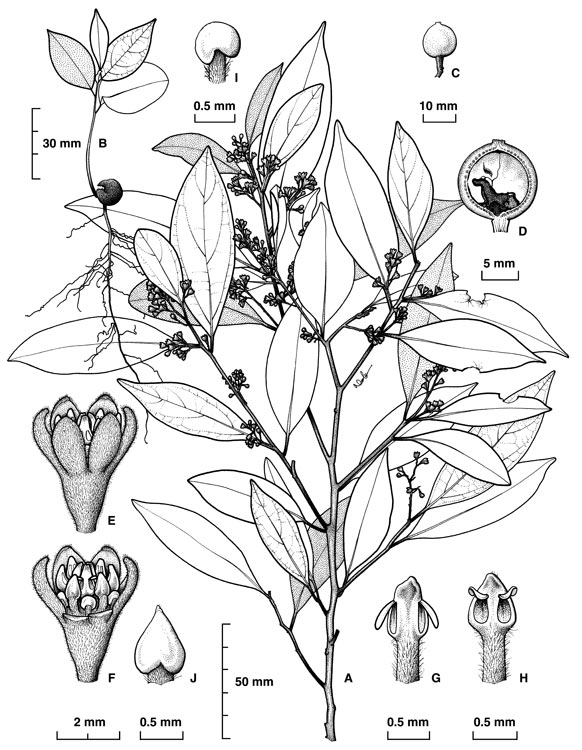
- Diagram of Cryptocarya smaragdina

Conservation status
- Least Concern (IUCN 3.1)

Scientific classification
- Kingdom: Plantae
- Clade: Tracheophytes
- Clade: Angiosperms
- Clade: Magnoliids
- Order: Laurales
- Family: Lauraceae
- Genus: Cryptocarya
- Species: C. smaragdina

Binomial name
- Cryptocarya smaragdina B.Hyland

= Cryptocarya smaragdina =

Species of tree

Cryptocarya smaragdina, commonly known as Dina's laurel, is a species of flowering plant in the family Lauraceae and is endemic to north Queensland. It is a shrub with lance-shaped leaves, creamy green, unpleasantly perfumed flowers, and spherical black drupes.

== Description ==
Cryptocarya smaragdina is a tree that typically grows to a height of up to 25 m (82 ft) and a dbh of up to 40 cm (16 in), its stems buttressed. Its leaves are lance-shaped, 50–85 mm (2.0–3.3 in) long and 15–25 mm (0.6–1.0 in) wide, on a petiole 5–10 mm (0.20–0.39 in) long. The flowers are creamy green and unpleasantly perfumed, and arranged in panicles shorter than the leaves. The perianth tube is 1.2–1.5 mm (0.047–0.059 in) long and 1.5–1.6 mm (0.059–0.063 in) wide, the outer tepals 1.5–2 mm (0.059–0.079 in) long and 0.9–1.2 mm (0.035–0.047 in) wide, the inner tepals 1.5–2.3 mm (0.059–0.091 in) long and 0.9–1.3 mm (0.035–0.051 in) wide. The outer anthers are 0.7–0.8 mm (0.028–0.031 in) long and 0.6 mm (0.024 in) wide, the inner anthers 0.8–0.9 mm (0.031–0.035 in) long and 0.4–0.5 mm (0.016–0.020 in) wide. Flowering occurs from September to November, and the fruit is a spherical black drupe, 9.0–11.5 mm (0.35–0.45 in) long and 10–11 mm (0.39–0.43 in) wide with creamy white cotyledons.

== Taxonomy ==
Cryptocarya smaragdina was first formally described in 1989 by Bernard Hyland in Australian Systematic Botany from specimens collected in State Forest Reserve 607 in 1982. The specific epithet (smaragdina) means 'emerald green'.

== Distribution and habitat ==
This species of Cryptocarya is restricted to the Atherton Tableland in north-east Queensland, between the Tinaroo Hills, the Lamb Range and Koombooloomba, where grows in rainforest between 50 and 1,200 m (160 and 3,940 ft) elevation.

== Conservation status ==
This species of Cryptocarya is listed as "of least concern" under the Queensland Government Nature Conservation Act 1992.
