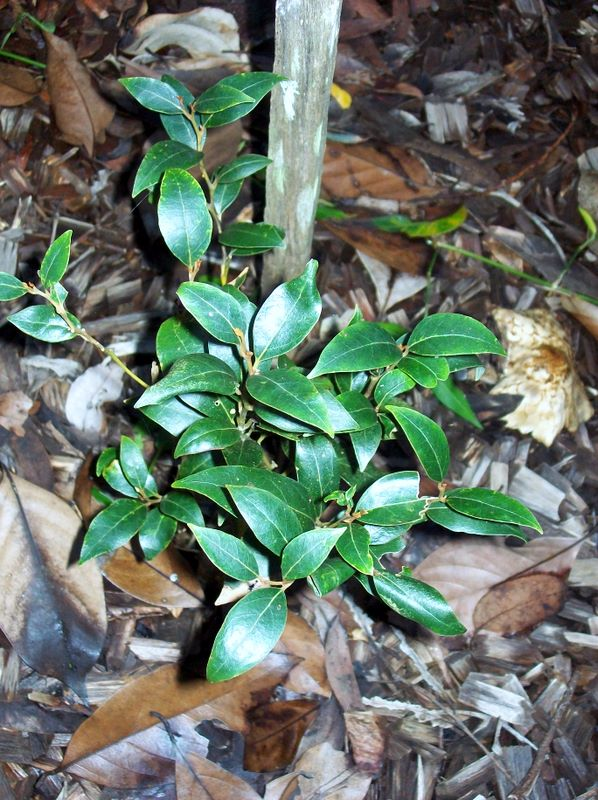
- Young specimen

Conservation status
- Vulnerable (IUCN 3.1)

Scientific classification
- Kingdom: Plantae
- Clade: Tracheophytes
- Clade: Angiosperms
- Clade: Magnoliids
- Order: Laurales
- Family: Lauraceae
- Genus: Cryptocarya
- Species: C. nova-anglica

Binomial name
- Cryptocarya nova-anglica A.G.Floyd & B.Hyland

= Cryptocarya nova-anglica =

Mountain laurel

Species of tree

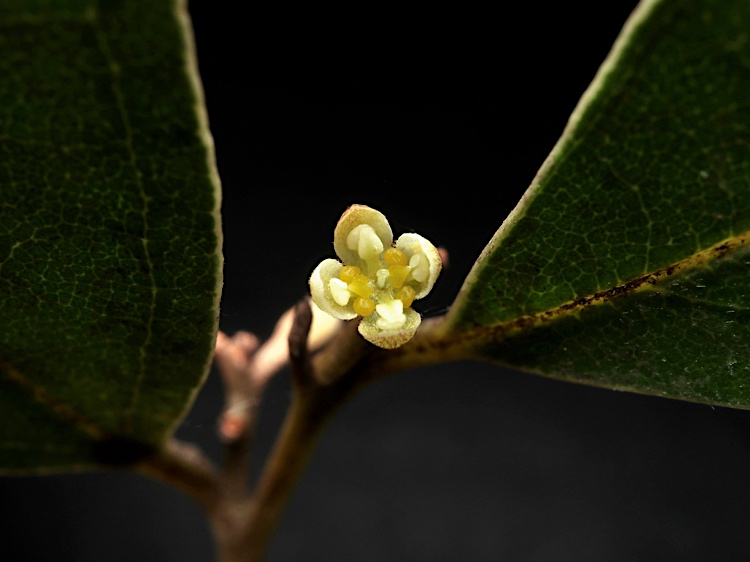
Flower

Cryptocarya nova-anglica, commonly known as mountain laurel, is a species of flowering plant in the family Lauraceae and is endemic to New South Wales. It is a tree with lance-shaped leaves, creamy green flowers, and elliptic to spherical to pear-shaped black drupes.

== Description ==
Cryptocarya nova-anglica is a tree that typically grows to a height of up to 20 m (66 ft) with a dbh of 45 cm (18 in), its stems not buttressed, but often with coppice shoots at the base. Its new growth has fawn-coloured hairs pressed against the stem, but is later glabrous. Its leaves are egg-shaped, lance-shaped or elliptic, 30–70 mm (1.2–2.8 in) long and 16–35 mm (0.6–1.4 in) wide on a petiole 5–8 mm (0.20–0.31 in) long, glossy green on the upper surface and glaucous below. The flowers are arranged in racemes barely longer than the petioles, and mostly in leaf axils. They are creamy-green, the perianth tube about 2 mm (0.08 in) long and 1.5 mm (0.06 in) wide. The outer anthers are 0.9 mm (0.04 in) long and 0.6 mm (0.02 in) wide, the inner anthers about 0.9 mm (0.04 in) long and 0.5 mm (0.02 in) wide. Flowering occurs from December to January, and the fruit is a spherical to pear-shaped black drupe, 12.5–15 mm (0.5–0.6 in) long and 13.0–13.5 mm (0.51–0.53 in) wide with creamy cotyledons.

== Taxonomy ==
Cryptocarya nova-anglica was first formally described in 1989 by Bernard Hyland and Alexander Floyd in Australian Systematic Botany from specimens collected at Point Lookout in the New England National Park.

== Distribution and habitat ==
This species of Cryptocarya grows in montane rainforest, often with Nothofagus moorei, at elevations between 1,100 and 1,350 m (3,610 and 4,430 ft), and is found in northern New South Wales between Mount Nothofagus in the McPherson Range and Mount Boss near Wauchope.
