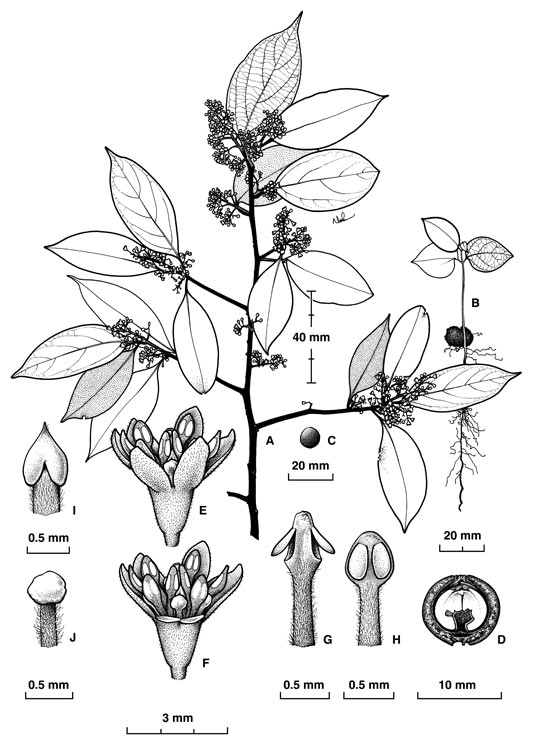

Conservation status
- Least Concern (IUCN 3.1)

Scientific classification
- Kingdom: Plantae
- Clade: Tracheophytes
- Clade: Angiosperms
- Clade: Magnoliids
- Order: Laurales
- Family: Lauraceae
- Genus: Cryptocarya
- Species: C. melanocarpa

Binomial name
- Cryptocarya melanocarpa B.Hyland

= Cryptocarya melanocarpa =

Species of flowering plant

Cryptocarya melanocarpa is a species of flowering plant in the family Lauraceae and is endemic to north Queensland. It is a tree with elliptic to oblong to lance-shaped leaves, creamy green, unpleasantly perfumed flowers, and spherical black drupes.

== Description ==
Cryptocarya melanocarpa is a tree that typically grows to a height of up to 20 m (66 ft), its stems sometimes buttressed. Its leaves are hairy, glaucous, elliptic to oblong to lance-shaped, 65–135 mm (2.6–5.3 in) long and 20–55 mm (0.8–2.2 in) wide, on a petiole 8–16 mm (0.31–0.63 in) long. The flowers are arranged in panicles mainly in leaf axils or on the ends of branches and are usually shorter than the leaves. They are creamy-green and unpleasantly perfumed. The perianth tube is 1.0–1.1 mm (0.04–0.04 in) long and 1.0–1.4 mm (0.039–0.055 in) wide. The outer anthers are 0.5–0.7 mm (0.02–0.03 in) long, 0.4–0.5 mm (0.016–0.020 in) wide and glabrous, the inner anthers 0.5–0.8 mm (0.02–0.03 in) long and about 0.4 mm (0.02 in) wide. Flowering occurs from January to March, and the fruit is a spherical or flattened spherical, black drupe, about 8–10 mm (0.3–0.4 in) long and 9.0–10.5 mm (0.35–0.41 in) wide with white or sometimes cream coloured cotyledons.

== Taxonomy ==
Cryptocarya melanocarpa was first formally described in 1989 by Bernard Hyland in Australian Systematic Botany from specimens he collected near the Gillies Highway in 1983. The specific epithet (melanocarpa) means 'black-fruited'.

== Distribution and habitat ==
Cryptocarya melanocarpa grows in rainforest from 700 to 1,100 m (2,300 to 3,600 ft) elevation between the Windsor Tableland and Millaa Millaa in north Queensland.

== Conservation status ==
This Cryptocarya species is listed as of "least concern" under the Queensland Government Nature Conservation Act 1992.
