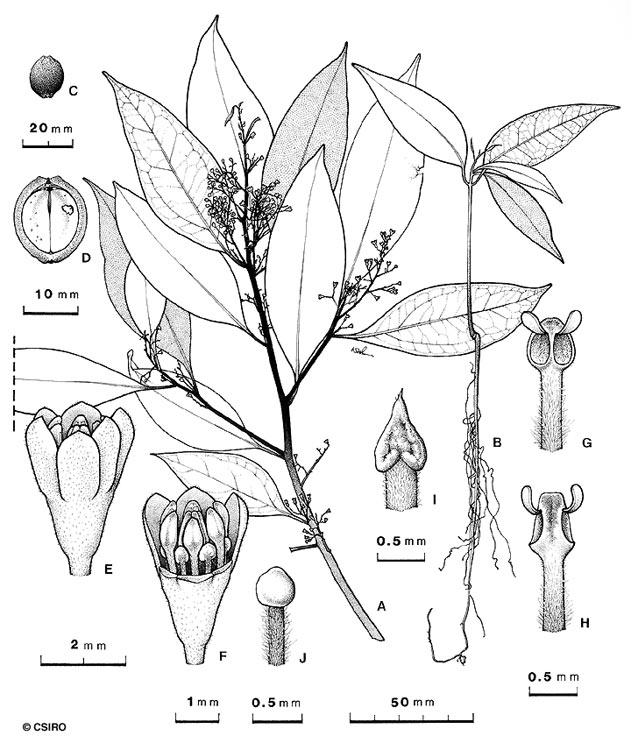

Conservation status
- Least Concern (IUCN 3.1)

Scientific classification
- Kingdom: Plantae
- Clade: Tracheophytes
- Clade: Angiosperms
- Clade: Magnoliids
- Order: Laurales
- Family: Lauraceae
- Genus: Cryptocarya
- Species: C. clarksoniana

Binomial name
- Cryptocarya clarksoniana B.Hyland

= Cryptocarya clarksoniana =

Species of tree

Cryptocarya clarksoniana, commonly known as Clarkson's laurel, is a tree in the laurel family and is endemic to north Queensland. Its leaves are lance-shaped to elliptic, the flowers creamy-green and tube-shaped, and the fruit a spherical black drupe.

== Description ==
Cryptocarya clarksoniana is a tree that typically grows to a height of 19 m (62 ft), its stems not buttressed. Its leaves are lance-shaped to elliptic, 55–150 mm (2.2–5.9 in) long and 20–50 mm (0.79–1.97 in) wide on a petiole 5–10 mm (0.20–0.39 in) long. The flowers are usually arranged in panicles shorter than the leaves and are perfumed. The tepals are 1.1–1.5 mm (0.043–0.059 in) long and 1.1–1.4 mm (0.043–0.055 in) wide, the outer anthers 0.5–0.6 mm (0.020–0.024 in) long and wide, the inner anthers 0.6–0.7 mm (0.024–0.028 in) long and 0.4–0.5 mm (0.016–0.020 in) wide. Flowering occurs from December to March, and the fruit is a spherical or elliptic black drupe 14–15 mm (0.55–0.59 in) long and 11–13 mm (0.43–0.51 in) wide.

== Taxonomy ==
Cryptocarya clarksoniana was first formally described in 1989 by Bernard Hyland in Australian Systematic Botany.

== Distribution and habitat ==
This species of Cryptocarya grows in rainforest rich in Agathis robusta in soils derived from granite, at elevations from sea level to 1,100 m (3,600 ft). It is found from the Big Tableland south of Cooktown to Goldsborough in north-eastern Queensland.
