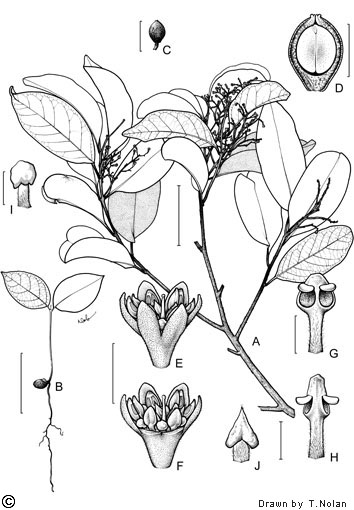

Conservation status
- Least Concern (IUCN 3.1)

Scientific classification
- Kingdom: Plantae
- Clade: Tracheophytes
- Clade: Angiosperms
- Clade: Magnoliids
- Order: Laurales
- Family: Lauraceae
- Genus: Cryptocarya
- Species: C. macdonaldii

Binomial name
- Cryptocarya macdonaldii B.Hyland

= Cryptocarya macdonaldii =

Species of tree

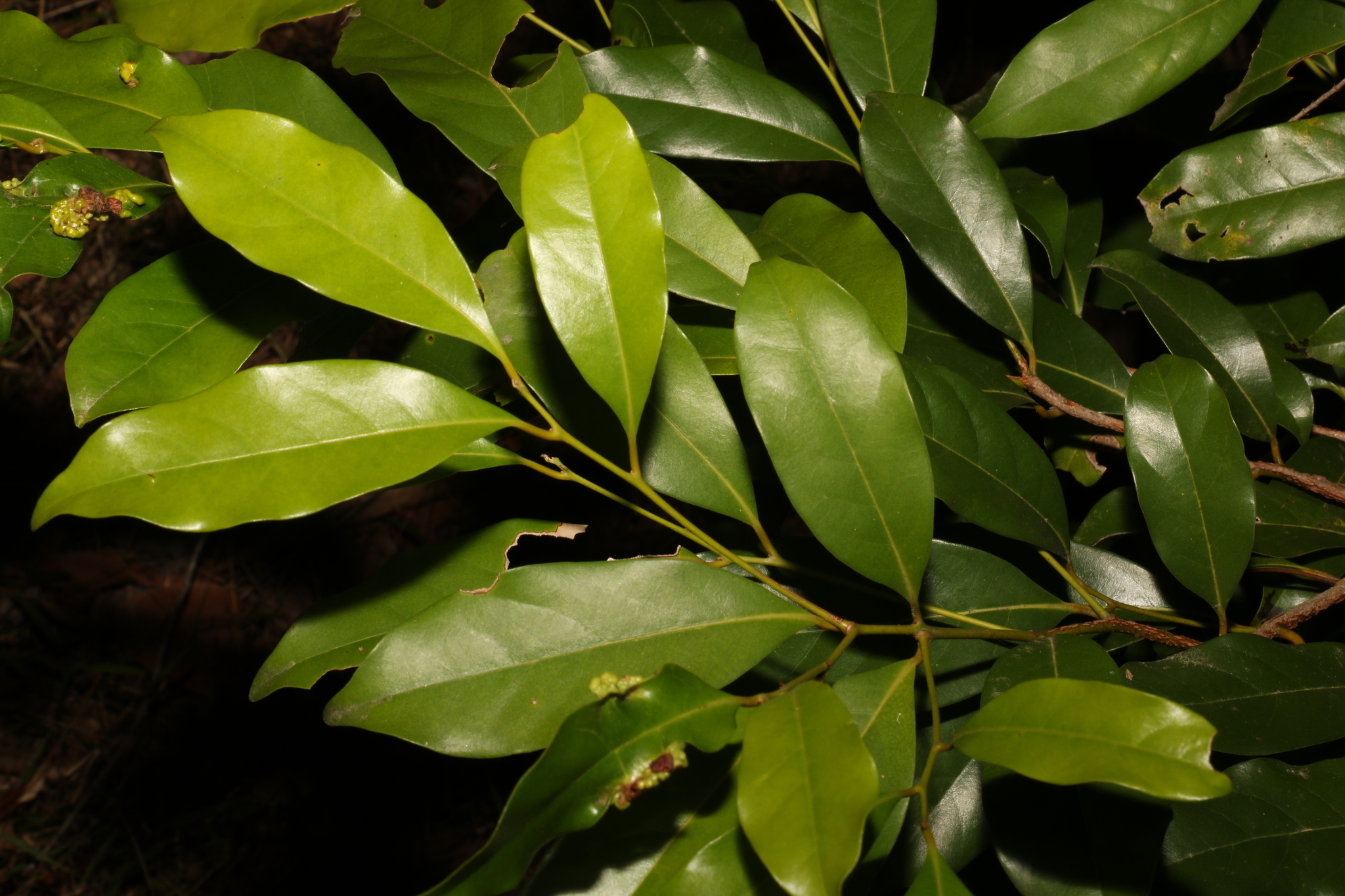
Leaves near Sheldon

Cryptocarya macdonaldii, commonly known as McDonald's laurel, McDonald's cryptocarya or Cooloola laurel, is a species of flowering plant in the family Lauraceae and is endemic to Central Queensland. It is a tree with elliptic to egg-shaped to oblong leaves, cream-coloured, unpleasantly perfumed flowers, and elliptical black drupes.

== Description ==
Cryptocarya macdonaldii is a tree that typically grows to a height of up to 30 m (98 ft), its stems sometimes buttressed. Its leaves are elliptic to egg-shaped to oblong, 90–130 mm (3.5–5.1 in) long and 30–50 mm (1.2–2.0 in) wide, on a petiole 6–14 mm (0.24–0.55 in) long. The flowers are arranged in panicles in leaf axils or on the ends of branches and are usually longer than the leaves. They are cream-coloured and unpleasantly perfumed. The perianth tube is 1.1–1.3 mm (0.04–0.05 in) long and wide. The outer anthers are 0.5–0.6 mm (0.02–0.02 in) long and wide, the inner anthers 0.6–0.7 mm (0.02–0.03 in) long and 0.4–0.5 mm (0.02–0.02 in) wide. Flowering occurs in January and February, and the fruit is an elliptical, black drupe, about 15 mm (0.6 in) long and 11 mm (0.43 in) wide with creamy-yellow cotyledons.

== Taxonomy ==
Cryptocarya macdonaldii was first formally described in 1989 by Bernard Hyland in Australian Systematic Botany from specimens he collected near the Bonogin Creek Road in 1983.

== Distribution and habitat ==
Cryptocarya macdonaldii grows in rainforest from sea level to 1,000 m (3,300 ft) elevation between Proserpine and Eungella and from Miriam Vale to south of Brisbane in Central Queensland.

== Conservation status ==
This Cryptocarya is listed as of "least concern" under the Queensland Government Nature Conservation Act 1992.
