= Cryptocarya ferrarsi =

Conservation status
- Vulnerable (IUCN 3.1)

Scientific classification
- Kingdom: Plantae
- Clade: Tracheophytes
- Clade: Angiosperms
- Clade: Magnoliids
- Order: Laurales
- Family: Lauraceae
- Genus: Cryptocarya
- Species: C. ferrarsi

Binomial name
- Cryptocarya ferrarsi King ex Hook.f.

Varieties
- Cryptocarya ferrarsi var. ferrarsi; Cryptocarya ferrarsi var. macrocarpa M.G.Gangop. & Chakrab.

Synonyms
- synonym of var. ferrarsi: Cryptocarya floribunda var. angustifolia Meisn.

Species of flowering plant

Cryptocarya ferrarsi is a species of small forest tree in the family Lauraceae. It is a tree native to Assam, Bangladesh, Myanmar, and the southern Andaman Islands.

Two varieties are accepted:

- Cryptocarya ferrarsi var. ferrarsi – Assam, Bangladesh, southern Andaman Islands
- Cryptocarya ferrarsi var. macrocarpa M.G.Gangop. & Chakrab. – Myanmar
