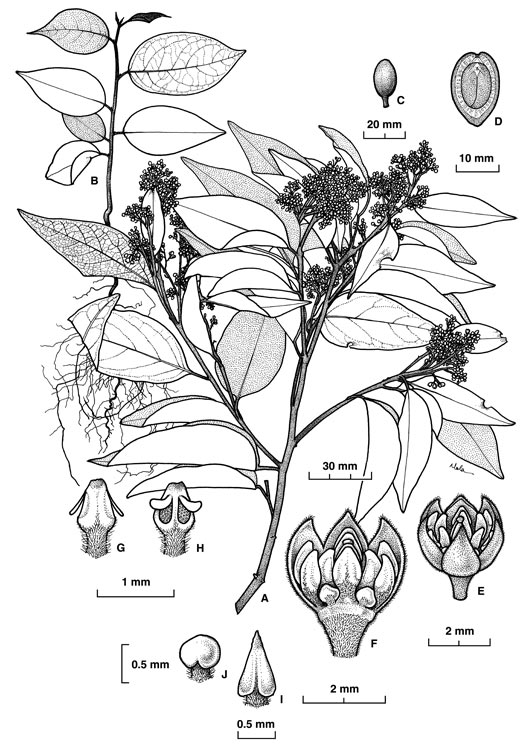
- Illustration of Cryptocarya saccharata

Conservation status
- Least Concern (IUCN 3.1)

Scientific classification
- Kingdom: Plantae
- Clade: Tracheophytes
- Clade: Angiosperms
- Clade: Magnoliids
- Order: Laurales
- Family: Lauraceae
- Genus: Cryptocarya
- Species: C. saccharata

Binomial name
- Cryptocarya saccharata B.Hyland

= Cryptocarya saccharata =

Species of tree

Cryptocarya saccharata, commonly known as sugar cane laurel, or corduroy laurel, is a species of flowering plant in the family Lauraceae and is endemic to Queensland. It is a tree with lance-shaped leaves, creamy green, perfumed flowers, and elliptic or pear-shaped black to bluish-black drupes.

== Description ==
Cryptocarya saccharata is a tree that typically grows to a height of up to 35 m (115 ft), its stems sometimes buttressed. Its leaves are lance-shaped, 55–120 mm (2.2–4.7 in) long and 20–50 mm (0.8–2.0 in) wide, on a petiole 5–11 mm (0.20–0.43 in) long and glaucous on the lower surface. The flowers are creamy green, perfumed, and arranged in panicles shorter than the leaves. The perianth tube is 0.7–1.1 mm (0.03–0.04 in) long and 1.2–1.6 mm (0.047–0.063 in) wide, the outer tepals 1.3–1.6 mm (0.051–0.063 in) long and 0.9–1.1 mm (0.035–0.043 in) wide, the outer tepals 0.5–0.6 mm (0.020–0.024 in) long and wide. The outer anthers are 0.5–0.6 mm (0.02–0.02 in) long and wide, the inner anthers 0.6–0.7 mm (0.02–0.03 in) long and 0.4–0.6 mm (0.016–0.024 in) wide. Flowering occurs in November and December, and the fruit is an elliptic or pear-shaped, black or bluish-black drupe, 17–24 mm (0.7–0.9 in) long and 11–15 mm (0.43–0.59 in) wide with yellowish cotyledons.

== Taxonomy ==
Cryptocarya saccharata was first formally described in 1989 by Bernard Hyland in Australian Systematic Botany from specimens collected in 1976. The specific epithet (saccharata) means 'sugary' or 'looking as if sprinkled with sugar'.

== Distribution and habitat ==
This species of Cryptocarya grows in rainforest from 650 to 1,150 m (2,130 to 3,770 ft) elevation, often in soils derived from granite, from the Windsor Tableland to near Townsville in north-east Queensland.

== Conservation status ==
This species of Cryptocarya is listed as "of least concern" under the Queensland Government Nature Conservation Act 1992.
