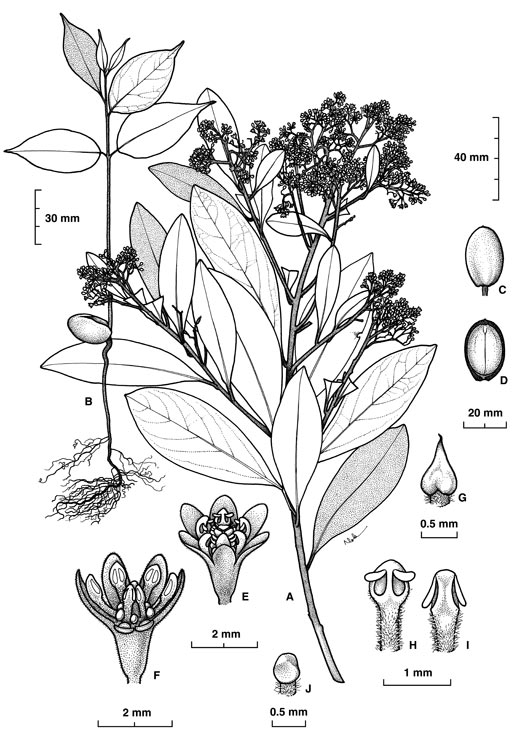

Conservation status
- Least Concern (IUCN 3.1)

Scientific classification
- Kingdom: Plantae
- Clade: Tracheophytes
- Clade: Angiosperms
- Clade: Magnoliids
- Order: Laurales
- Family: Lauraceae
- Genus: Cryptocarya
- Species: C. angulata

Binomial name
- Cryptocarya angulata C.T.White

= Cryptocarya angulata =

Ivory laurel

Species of tree

Cryptocarya angulata, commonly known as ivory laurel, ivory walnut, bull's breath or acidwood, is a tree in the laurel family and is endemic to north Queensland, Australia. Its leaves are lance-shaped to elliptic or egg-shaped, the flowers tube-shaped and creamy-green and the fruit a bluish or black drupe.

== Description ==
Cryptocarya angulata is a rainforest tree that typically grows to a height of 30 m (98 ft), but its stem is not usually buttressed. Its leaves are lance-shaped to elliptic or egg-shaped, 47–142 mm (1.9–5.6 in) long and 25–60 mm (0.98–2.36 in) wide on a petiole 4–13 mm (0.16–0.51 in) long. The flowers are borne in panicles that are shorter than the leaves, the flowers sometimes with an unpleasant odour. The tepals are 1.3–1.7 mm (0.051–0.067 in) long, the outer anthers 0.5–0.7 mm (0.020–0.028 in) long and the inner anthers 0.6–0.7 mm (0.024–0.028 in) long. Flowering occurs from November to January, and the fruit is an elliptic, blue-black to black drupe 24–30 mm (0.94–1.18 in) long and 14–20 mm (0.55–0.79 in) wide.

== Taxonomy ==
Cryptocarya angulata was first formally described in 1933 by Cyril Tenison White in Contributions from the Arnold Arboretum of Harvard University, from specimens collected from Gadgarra on the Atherton Tableland at an elevation of about 800 m (2,600 ft).

== Distribution and habitat ==
Ivory laurel grows in rainforest at elevations up to 1,250 m (4,100 ft) above sea level, between Cooktown and Eungella in north Queensland.
