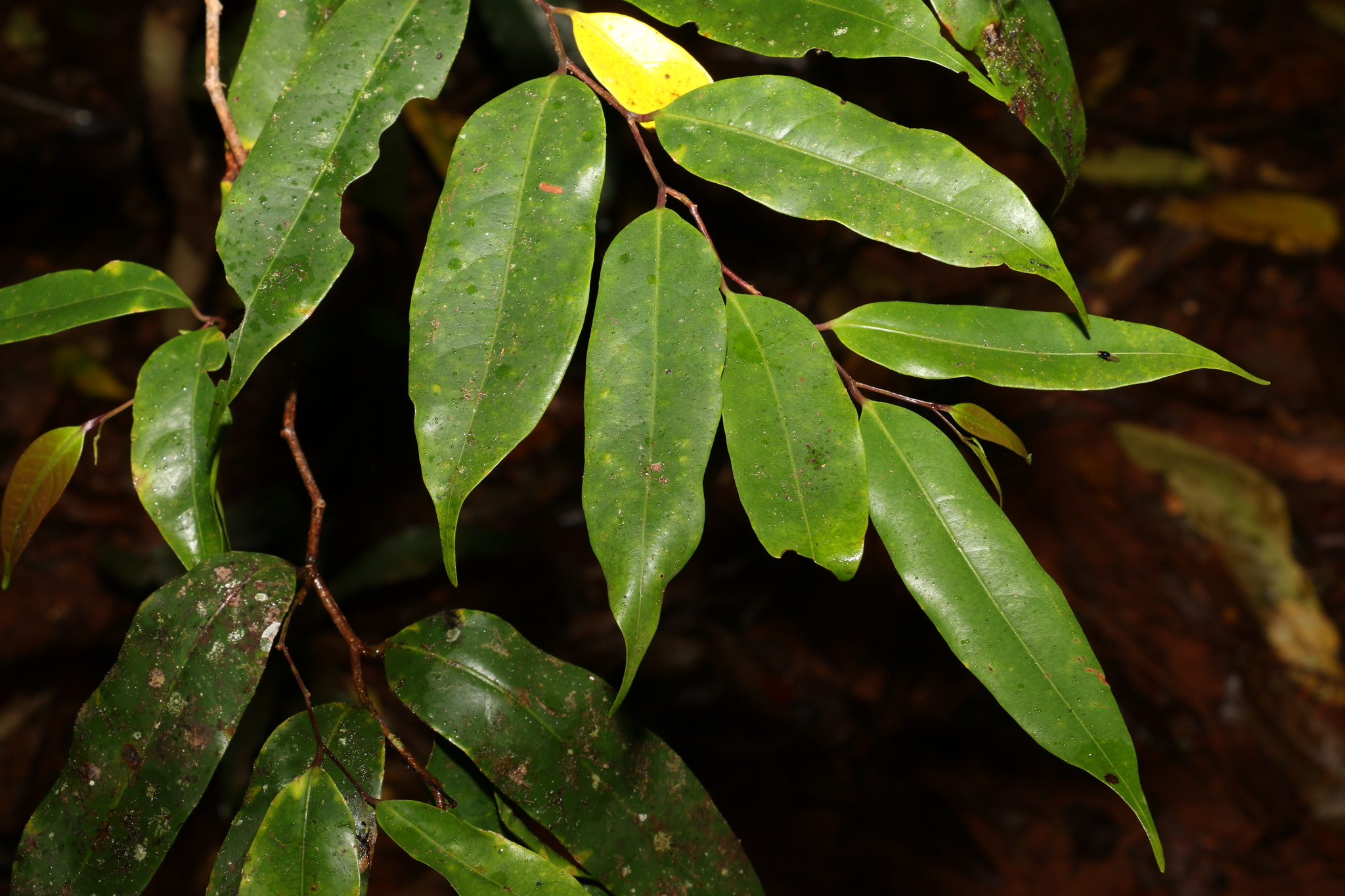
- Leaves

Conservation status
- Least Concern (IUCN 3.1)

Scientific classification
- Kingdom: Plantae
- Clade: Tracheophytes
- Clade: Angiosperms
- Clade: Magnoliids
- Order: Laurales
- Family: Lauraceae
- Genus: Cryptocarya
- Species: C. oblata

Binomial name
- Cryptocarya oblata F.M.Bailey

= Cryptocarya oblata =

Mountain laurel

Species of tree

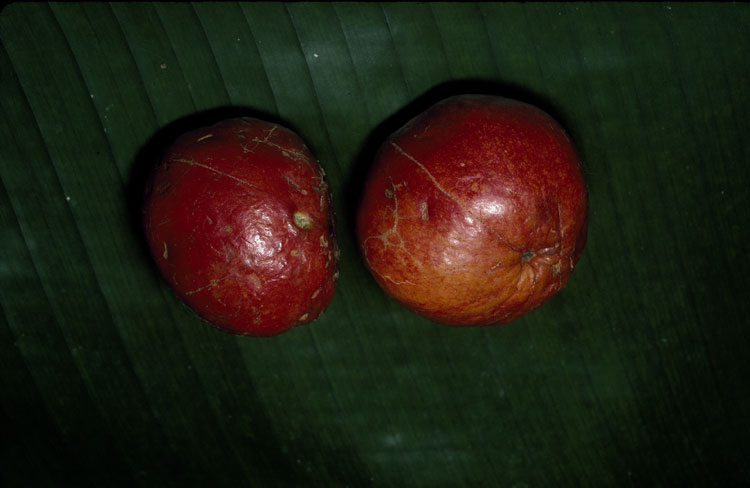
Fruit

Cryptocarya oblata, commonly known as the bolly silkwood, silkwood, bolly, tarzali or tarzali silkwood, is a species of flowering plant in the family Lauraceae and is endemic to north-eastern Queensland. It is a tree with lance-shaped to elliptic leaves, creamy green, perfumed flowers, and flattened spherical to pear-shaped, red to orange drupes.

== Description ==
Cryptocarya oblata is a tree that typically grows to a height of up to 35 m (115 ft), its stems usually buttressed. Its leaves are lance-shaped to elliptic, 75–140 mm (3.0–5.5 in) long and 29–57 mm (1.1–2.2 in) wide on a petiole 7–14 mm (0.28–0.55 in) long. The flowers are arranged in panicles shorter than the leaves. They are creamy-green and perfumed, the perianth tube 0.3–0.7 mm (0.01–0.03 in) long and 1.4–2.2 mm (0.06–0.09 in) wide, the tepals 1.5–2 mm (0.059–0.079 in) long and 0.9–1.4 mm (0.035–0.055 in) wide. The outer anthers are 0.6–0.9 mm (0.02–0.04 in) long and 0.6–0.8 mm (0.02–0.03 in) wide, the inner anthers 0.7–0.9 mm (0.03–0.04 in) long and 0.5–0.6 mm (0.02–0.02 in) wide. Flowering occurs from November to February, and the fruit is a laterally compressed to red to orange drupe, 32–47 mm (1.3–1.9 in) long and 25–38 mm (0.98–1.50 in) wide with white or cream-coloured cotyledons.

== Taxonomy ==
Cryptocarya oblata was first formally described in 1894 by Frederick Manson Bailey in the Botany Bulletin of the Department of Agriculture Queensland, from specimens collected at the Daintree River.

== Distribution and habitat ==
This species of Cryptocarya grows rainforest from sea level to 1,150 m (3,770 ft) elevation, between Cooktown and Koombooloomba in central eastern Queensland.
