= Cryptocarya tesselata =

- Image of Cryptocarya tesselata sample in herbarium

Conservation status
- Critically Endangered (IUCN 3.1)

Scientific classification
- Kingdom: Plantae
- Clade: Tracheophytes
- Clade: Angiosperms
- Clade: Magnoliids
- Order: Laurales
- Family: Lauraceae
- Genus: Cryptocarya
- Species: C. tesselata

Binomial name
- Cryptocarya tesselata Kosterm.

Species of flowering plant

Cryptocarya tesselata is a species of flowering plant in the laurel family, Lauraceae. It is a tree native to the Louisiade Archipelago of Papua New Guinea, which lies east of mainland New Guinea. In 2020 this species was classified as being critically endangered.
