= Endiandra leptodendron =

- Botanical sketch

Conservation status
- Least Concern (IUCN 3.1)

Scientific classification
- Kingdom: Plantae
- Clade: Tracheophytes
- Clade: Angiosperms
- Clade: Magnoliids
- Order: Laurales
- Family: Lauraceae
- Genus: Endiandra
- Species: E. leptodendron

Binomial name
- Endiandra leptodendron B.Hyland

Species of flowering plant

Endiandra leptodendron is a species of plant in the family Lauraceae native to Queensland, Australia. It is a rainforest tree, first described in 1989. It has a conservation status of least-concern.

== Description ==
Endiandra leptodendron is a tree that can grow up to 18 m (59 ft) in height and 30 cm (12 in) diameter, and the trunk is often buttressed. The leaves are generally about 13 cm (5.1 in) long and 6 cm (2.4 in) wide and have 5–8 pairs of lateral veins. They are elliptic or lanceolate in shape, and the petiole averages about 10 mm (0.4 in) long. The midrib may be raised or flush with the upper surface of the blade, and domatia are absent.

The inflorescence is a panicle emerging from the leaf axils. Flowers are pale blueish or green and faintly scented; they have six tepals up to 2 mm (0.08 in) long. The fruits are an ellipsoid drupe, black or purple-black, and shiny or glaucous. They measure up to 2.9 cm (1.1 in) long and 1.4 cm (0.6 in) wide, and contain a single brown seed up to 1.8 cm (0.7 in) long and 1.1 cm (0.4 in) wide.

== Distribution ==
The species grows in well-developed rainforest on various soil types, from near Rossville to the Seaview Range west of Ingham. It occurs at altitudes from sea level 1,000 m (3,300 ft).

== Conservation ==
This species was assessed by the International Union for Conservation of Nature (IUCN) in 2023 and found to be of least-concern. It is also rated as least-concern by the Queensland Government under its Nature Conservation Act. In its statement, the IUCN cites the lack of any perceived threat to the species, as well as a wide distribution and large population, as the basis for the assessment.
