= Endiandra jonesii =

- Endiandra jonesii botanical sketch

Conservation status
- Vulnerable (NCA)

Scientific classification
- Kingdom: Plantae
- Clade: Tracheophytes
- Clade: Angiosperms
- Clade: Magnoliids
- Order: Laurales
- Family: Lauraceae
- Genus: Endiandra
- Species: E. jonesii

Binomial name
- Endiandra jonesii B.Hyland

Species of flowering plant

Endiandra jonesii is a species of plant in the family Lauraceae native to Queensland, Australia. It is a rainforest tree, first described in 1989. It has a conservation status of vulnerable.

== Description ==
Endiandra jonesii is a tree that can grow up to 35 m (115 ft) in height and 60 cm (24 in) diameter, and the trunk is often buttressed. The leaves are generally about 7 cm (2.8 in) long and 2 cm (0.79 in) wide and have 8–13 pairs of lateral veins. They are green on both sides, but the underside has a fine covering of reddish brown hairs when young. The petiole averages about 9 mm (0.4 in) long. The midrib may be depressed or flush with the upper surface of the blade, and domatia are absent.

The inflorescence is a panicle emerging from the leaf axils. Flowers are cream or creamy yellow and scented; they have six tepals up to 2 mm (0.08 in) long. The fruits are an ellipsoid or globular drupe, black or purple-black. They measure up to 5.5 cm (2.2 in) long and 6 cm (2.4 in) wide, and are usually laterally compressed. They contain a single brown seed up to 4.2 cm (1.7 in) long and 4.8 cm (1.9 in) wide.

== Distribution ==
The species grows in well-developed rainforest on granite soils, from near Mount Misery in the Ngalba Bulal National Park to Mount Lewis. It occurs at altitudes from 600 to 1,000 m (2,000 to 3,300 ft).

== Conservation ==
This species is listed as vulnerable in the Queensland Government's WildNet database. As of September 2026, it has not been assessed by the International Union for Conservation of Nature.
