= Endiandra grayi =

- Botanical illustration

Conservation status
- Vulnerable (NCA)

Scientific classification
- Kingdom: Plantae
- Clade: Tracheophytes
- Clade: Angiosperms
- Clade: Magnoliids
- Order: Laurales
- Family: Lauraceae
- Genus: Endiandra
- Species: E. grayi

Binomial name
- Endiandra grayi B.Hyland

Species of flowering plant

Endiandra grayi is a species of plant in the family Lauraceae native to northeast Queensland, Australia. It is a rainforest tree, first described in 1989, with a conservation status of vulnerable.

== Description ==
Endiandra grayi is a tree that may grow to about 35 m (115 ft) in height and 90 cm (35 in) diameter. The trunk is often buttressed and the bark is nondescript. The leaves are generally about 13 cm (5.1 in) long and 4 cm (1.6 in) wide and have 6–9 pairs of lateral veins. The upperside is green, the underside is glaucous and covered in brownish hairs when young, hairless when mature. The midrib is sunken in the upper surface of the leaf blade. The petiole is about 1.5 cm (0.6 in) long, and domatia are absent.

The inflorescence is a panicle emerging from the leaf axils and not extending further than the leaves. Flowers are yellow green inside and hairy brown on the outside. They are unscented and have six tepals about 4 mm (0.16 in) long. The fruit is an ellipsoid drupe, dark blue or black, glaucous, up to 6.5 cm (2.6 in) long and 5.5 cm (2.2 in) wide. It contains a single brown seed about 50 mm (2.0 in) long and 32 mm (1.3 in) wide.

== Distribution ==
It is restricted to the small area from Cape Tribulation to the Daintree River, and up to 40 m (130 ft) above sea level. It grows in well-developed rainforest.

== Ecology ==
The fruit of E. grayi is eaten by cassowaries.

== Conservation ==
This species is listed as vulnerable in the Queensland Government's WildNet database. As of September 2026, the International Union for Conservation of Nature has not assessed it.
