= Endiandra xanthocarpa =

- Botanical illustration

Conservation status
- Least Concern (IUCN 3.1)

Scientific classification
- Kingdom: Plantae
- Clade: Tracheophytes
- Clade: Angiosperms
- Clade: Magnoliids
- Order: Laurales
- Family: Lauraceae
- Genus: Endiandra
- Species: E. xanthocarpa

Binomial name
- Endiandra xanthocarpa B.Hyland

Species of flowering plant

Endiandra xanthocarpa is a species of plant in the family Lauraceae native to northeast Queensland, Australia. It is a rainforest tree, first described in 1989. It has a conservation status of least concern.

== Description ==
Endiandra xanthocarpa is a large tree that may grow to about 30 m (98 ft) in height and 60 cm (24 in) diameter. The trunk is usually buttressed in older specimens. The leaves are green and hairless, and generally about 12 cm (4.7 in) long and 5 cm (2.0 in) wide. The midrib is depressed on the upper surface and there are between four and eight pairs of lateral veins branching from it. The petiole averages about 1.8 cm (0.7 in) long.

The inflorescences are panicles that grow from the leaf axils or on the twigs behind the leaves. Flowers are yellow to cream and faintly scented. They have four tepals about 1 mm (0.04 in) long. The fruit is a yellow or orange ellipsoid drupe up to about 7 cm (2.8 in) long and 4.5 cm (1.8 in) wide containing a single brown seed up to 6 cm (2.4 in) long and 4 cm (1.6 in) wide.

== Taxonomy ==
The species was first described in 1989 by Australian botanist Bernard Hyland, in his 367-page revision of the Lauraceae family in Australia.

=== Etymology ===
The species epithet 'xanthocarpa' is derived from xantho- 'yellow', and -carpos 'fruit', and is a reference to the colour of the fruit.

== Distribution ==
This species is restricted to the eastern edge of the Atherton Tableland at Boonjee, and the adjacent foothills near Babinda. The altitudinal range is from about 80 m (260 ft) to 760 m (2,490 ft). It grows in well developed rainforest on basalt soils.

== Conservation ==
As of September 2026, this species has been assessed to be of least concern by the International Union for Conservation of Nature (IUCN) and by the Queensland Government in its Wildnet database. In its statement, the IUCN cites the lack of any perceived threat to the species, as well as a large population, as the basis for the assessment. The Wildnet database does not provide any supporting explanations for its assessments.

== Ecology ==
Fruits of the this tree are eaten by musky rat-kangaroos, parrots and white-tailed rats.
