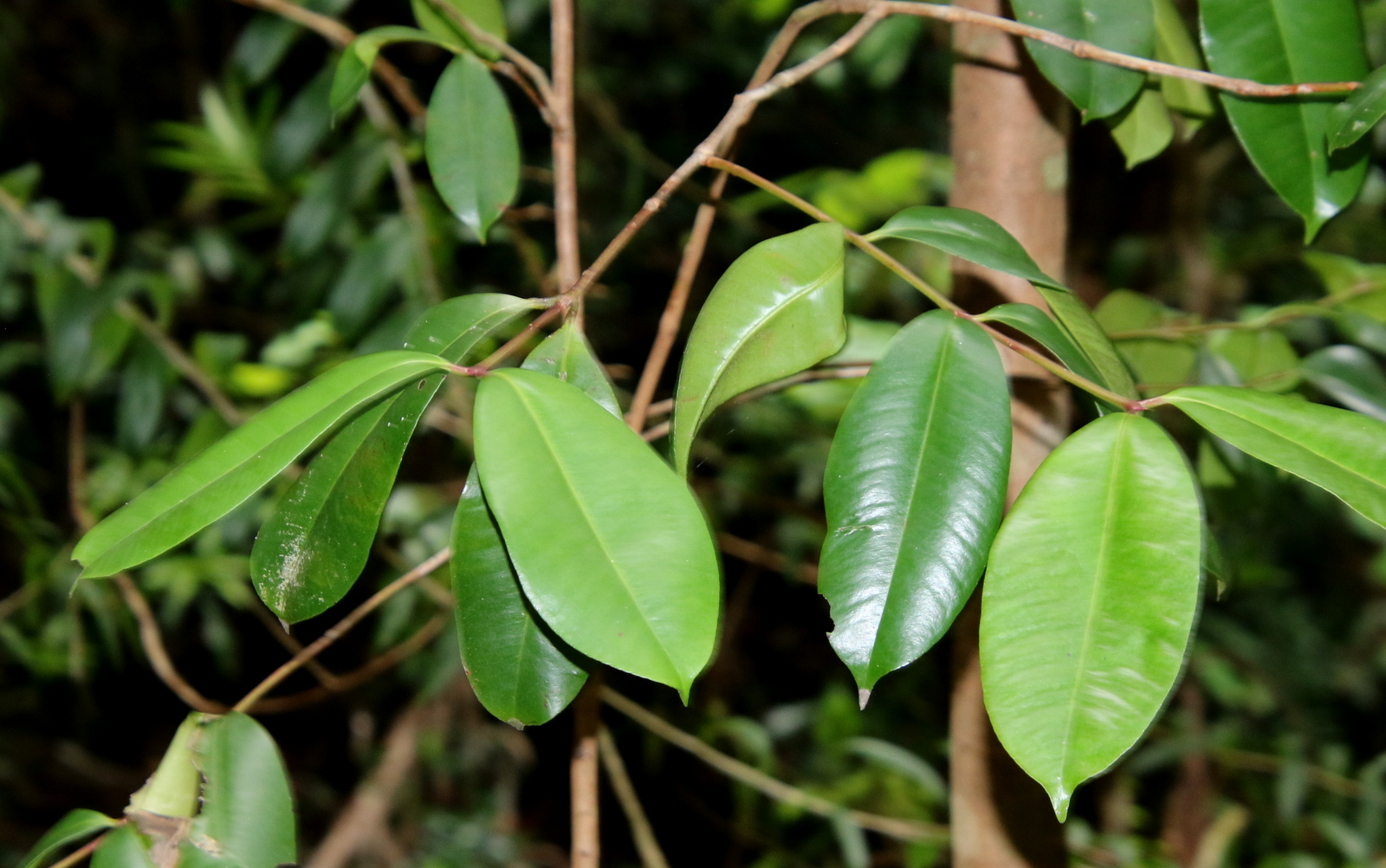
- Fraser Island, Australia

Scientific classification
- Kingdom: Plantae
- Clade: Tracheophytes
- Clade: Angiosperms
- Clade: Eudicots
- Clade: Rosids
- Order: Myrtales
- Family: Myrtaceae
- Genus: Syzygium
- Species: S. johnsonii

Binomial name
- Syzygium johnsonii (F.Muell.) B.Hyland

Synonyms
- Eugenia johnsonii

= Syzygium johnsonii =

Rose satinash

Species of tree

Syzygium johnsonii, known as the rose satinash, is a rainforest tree of tropical and subtropical Queensland, Australia.
