= Endiandra wolfei =

- Flowering

Conservation status
- Least Concern (IUCN 3.1)

Scientific classification
- Kingdom: Plantae
- Clade: Tracheophytes
- Clade: Angiosperms
- Clade: Magnoliids
- Order: Laurales
- Family: Lauraceae
- Genus: Endiandra
- Species: E. wolfei

Binomial name
- Endiandra wolfei B.Hyland

Species of flowering plant

Endiandra wolfei is a species of plant in the family Lauraceae native to northeast Queensland, Australia. It is a rainforest tree, first described in 1989. It has a conservation status of least concern.

== Description ==
Endiandra wolfei is a medium sized tree that may grow to about 25 m (82 ft) in height and 60 cm (24 in) diameter. The trunk is often buttressed and coppice shoots may be present. The leaves are generally about 9 cm (3.5 in) long and 3 cm (1.2 in) wide, green above glaucous underneath. The midrib is sunken into the leaf blade on the upper surface and there are between three and five pairs of lateral veins branching from it.

The inflorescence is a raceme or panicle which grows from the leaf axils. Flowers are green to cream or yellow and have no scent. They have six tepals arranged in two whorls of three, each about 2 mm (0.08 in) long. The fruit is a dark blue to black ellipsoid drupe up to 2.4 cm (0.9 in) long and 1.3 cm (0.5 in) wide. It contains a single brown seed up to 2.1 cm (0.8 in) long and 1.1 cm (0.4 in) wide.

== Distribution ==
This species is found in rainforests along the coast and adjacent ranges of northeast Queensland, between Cooktown and Eungella National Park. It grows on soils of various types, from sea level up to about 1,100 m (3,600 ft).

== Taxonomy ==
The species was first described in 1989 by Australian botanist Bernard Hyland, in his 367-page revision of the Lauraceae family in Australia.

=== Etymology ===
The species was named in honour of a colleague of Hyland's, Mr T.J. Wolfe.

== Conservation ==
As of September 2026, this species has been assessed to be of least concern by the International Union for Conservation of Nature (IUCN) and by the Queensland Government in its Wildnet database. In its statement, the IUCN cites the lack of any perceived threat to the species, as well as a wide distribution and large population, as the basis for the assessment. The Wildnet database does not provide any explanations for its assessments.
