= Endiandra limnophila =

- Botanical sketch

Conservation status
- Endangered (IUCN 3.1)
- Least Concern (NCA)

Scientific classification
- Kingdom: Plantae
- Clade: Tracheophytes
- Clade: Angiosperms
- Clade: Magnoliids
- Order: Laurales
- Family: Lauraceae
- Genus: Endiandra
- Species: E. limnophila

Binomial name
- Endiandra limnophila B.Hyland

Species of flowering plant

Endiandra limnophila is a species of plant in the family Lauraceae native to the Northern Territory and Queensland, Australia. It is a rainforest tree, first described in 1989. It has a conservation status of least-concern in Queensland, but has been classed as endangered by the IUCN.

== Description ==
Endiandra limnophila is a tree that can grow up to 20 m (66 ft) in height and 30 cm (12 in) diameter, and the trunk is often buttressed. The leaves are generally about 9 cm (3.5 in) long and 4 cm (1.6 in) wide and have 4–8 pairs of lateral veins. They are slightly glaucous underneath and foveoles are present in the junctions of the lateral veins with the mid vein. The petiole averages about 12 mm (0.5 in) long. The midrib is flush with the upper surface of the blade.

The inflorescence is a panicle emerging from the leaf axils. Flowers are pale green to cream, turning brown as they age. They are faintly scented and have six tepals in two whorls of three, each up to 1 mm (0.04 in) long. The fruits are an ellipsoid drupe, black or glaucous. They measure up to 3.5 cm (1.4 in) long and 1.5 cm (0.6 in) wide, and contain a single brown seed up to 2.7 cm (1.1 in) long and 1.1 cm (0.4 in) wide.

== Distribution ==
The species grows in gallery rainforest on the margins of swampy creeks. It occurs on islands of the Torres Strait, in the northern parts of Cape York Peninsula, and in the Northern Territory. It occurs up to about 80 m (260 ft) above sea level.

== Conservation ==
This species was assessed by the International Union for Conservation of Nature (IUCN) in 2021 and classified as vulnerable, but it is rated as least-concern by the Queensland Government under its Nature Conservation Act. In its statement, the IUCN cites fragmented populations and habitat loss as the basis for the assessment.
