= Endiandra sideroxylon =

- Botanical illustration

Conservation status
- Least Concern (IUCN 3.1)

Scientific classification
- Kingdom: Plantae
- Clade: Tracheophytes
- Clade: Angiosperms
- Clade: Magnoliids
- Order: Laurales
- Family: Lauraceae
- Genus: Endiandra
- Species: E. sideroxylon

Binomial name
- Endiandra sideroxylon B.Hyland

Species of flowering plant

Endiandra sideroxylon, commonly known as buff walnut or steelbutt, is a species of plant in the family Lauraceae native to northeast Queensland, Australia. It is a rainforest tree, first described in 1989. It has a conservation status of least concern.

== Description ==
Endiandra sideroxylon is a large tree that may grow to about 35 m (115 ft) in height and 150 cm (59 in) diameter. The trunk is often buttressed and the bark is nondescript. The leaves are generally about 8 cm (3.1 in) long and 4 cm (1.6 in) wide and may be sparsely hairy underneath when young. The midrib is raised or flush with the upper surface and there are between six and ten lateral veins branching from it.

The inflorescences are panicles that grow from the leaf axils. Flowers are yellow to cream and may be scented or not. They have six tepals arranged in two whorls, each about 2 mm (0.08 in) long. The fruit is a black ellipsoid drupe up to about 5 cm (2.0 in) long and 3 cm (1.2 in) wide containing a single brown seed up to 4.7 cm (1.9 in) long and 2.3 cm (0.9 in) wide.

== Taxonomy ==
The species was first described in 1989 by Australian botanist Bernard Hyland, in his 367-page revision of the Lauraceae family in Australia.

=== Etymology ===
The species epithet 'sideroxylon' is derived from sideron 'iron', and oxylon 'wood'. This name and the common name 'steelbutt' are both references to the very hard timber produced by the tree.

== Distribution ==
This species is restricted to the Atherton Tableland and nearby areas, from the vicinity of Lake Tinaroo in the north to Tully Gorge National Park in the south, at altitudes from 140 m (460 ft) to 1,000 m (3,300 ft). It grows in rainforest on a variety of soils, but appears to grow best on basalt soils.

Fruit and seed

== Conservation ==
As of September 2026, this species has been assessed to be of least concern by the International Union for Conservation of Nature (IUCN) and by the Queensland Government in its Wildnet database. In its statement, the IUCN cites the lack of any perceived threat to the species, as well as a large population, as the basis for the assessment. The Wildnet database does not provide any supporting explanations for its assessments.

== Ecology ==
Fruits of the this tree are eaten by various birds, including cassowaries, Lewin's honeyeaters, spotted catbirds, figbirds and fruit doves.

== Uses ==
The tree is harvested for timber, which is sold under the trade name 'buff walnut'.
