= Endiandra collinsii =

- Botanical illustration

Conservation status
- Least Concern (IUCN 3.1)

Scientific classification
- Kingdom: Plantae
- Clade: Tracheophytes
- Clade: Angiosperms
- Clade: Magnoliids
- Order: Laurales
- Family: Lauraceae
- Genus: Endiandra
- Species: E. collinsii

Binomial name
- Endiandra collinsii B.Hyland

Species of flowering plant

Endiandra collinsii is a species of plant in the family Lauraceae native to northeast Queensland, Australia. It is a rainforest tree, first described in 1989. It has a conservation status of least concern.

== Description ==
Endiandra collinsii is a small tree that may grow to about 15 m (49 ft) in height and 20 cm (7.9 in) diameter. The trunk is often buttressed and the bark is nondescript. The leaves are generally about 8 cm (3.1 in) long and 3 cm (1.2 in) wide and have 4–6 pairs of lateral veins. They are green on both sides but the underside in some cases may be glaucous; there are often foveoles in the junctions of the lateral veins with the mid vein.

The inflorescence is a panicle emerging from the leaf axils. Flowers are green to cream and have no scent; they have six tepals about 1 mm (0.04 in) long. The fruit is a glossy black ellipsoid drupe up to 23 mm (0.9 in) long and 14 mm (0.6 in) wide containing a single brown seed.

== Distribution ==
This species is found in three disjunct populations in Cape York Peninsula – the northernmost near Lockhart River, another near Coen and the southernmost near Cooktown. It grows in rainforest and monsoon forest on a variety of soils at altitudes from 60 m (200 ft) to 500 m (1,600 ft).

== Conservation ==
As of September 2026, this species has been assessed to be of least concern by the International Union for Conservation of Nature (IUCN) and by the Queensland Government in its Wildnet database.
