= Endiandra bellendenkerana =

- Botanical illustration

Conservation status
- Near Threatened (NCA)

Scientific classification
- Kingdom: Plantae
- Clade: Tracheophytes
- Clade: Angiosperms
- Clade: Magnoliids
- Order: Laurales
- Family: Lauraceae
- Genus: Endiandra
- Species: E. bellendenkerana

Binomial name
- Endiandra bellendenkerana B.Hyland

Species of flowering plant

Endiandra bellendenkerana is a species of plant in the family Lauraceae native to the Wet Tropics bioregion of Queensland, Australia. It was first described in 1989 and has a conservation status of near-threatened species.

== Description ==
Endiandra bellendenkerana is a tree that can grow to a height of 12 m (39 ft). It has simple leaves up to 16 cm (6.3 in) long and 8 cm (3.1 in)wide. The inflorescence is a panicle that emerges from the leaf axils. The green to bluish flowers have six tepals which are about 1 mm (0.04 in) long. The fruit is a black drupe about 2.3 cm (0.9 in) long and 1 cm (0.4 in) wide.

== Conservation status ==
It is rated as near-threatened by the Queensland Government under its Nature Conservation Act. As of 6 September 2026, it has not been assessed by the International Union for Conservation of Nature.
