= Plumwood =

Plumwood can refer to:

== Plants ==
- Endiandra virens
- Eucryphia moorei
- Planchonella myrsinoides, yellow plumwood
- Terminalia grandiflora

== People ==
- Val Plumwood (1939–2008), Australian ecofeminist philosopher and activist

== Places ==
- Plumwood, Ohio

== See also ==
- Prunus, plum trees
