= Endiandra montana =

- Fruit and leaves

Conservation status
- Least Concern (IUCN 3.1)

Scientific classification
- Kingdom: Plantae
- Clade: Tracheophytes
- Clade: Angiosperms
- Clade: Magnoliids
- Order: Laurales
- Family: Lauraceae
- Genus: Endiandra
- Species: E. montana

Binomial name
- Endiandra montana C.T.White

Synonyms
- Brassiodendron fragrans C.K.Allen; Endiandra fragrans (C.K.Allen) Kosterm.

Species of flowering plant

Endiandra montana, commonly known as brown walnut or montane walnut, is a species of plant in the family Lauraceae, first described in 1933. It is a large rainforest tree native to New Guinea and northeast Queensland, Australia, and has a conservation status of least concern.

== Description ==
Endiandra montana is a buttressed tree growing up to 30 m (98 ft) tall with a trunk up to 80 cm (31 in) diameter. The young twigs are fluted and finely hairy but soon become hairless. Leaves are glossy green, arranged alternately or in opposite pairs, and are generally about 10 cm (3.9 in) long and 5 cm (2.0 in) wide. The midrib is flush with the upper surface and there are between 6 and 14 pairs of secondary veins branching from it. The petiole averages about 10 mm (0.39 in) long and domatia are absent.

Inflorescences take the form of a raceme and grow from the leaf axils. The cream or yellowish flowers are very fragrant. They have six tepals in two whorls, each about 4 mm (0.16 in) long. The six anthers are about 1.8 mm (0.07 in) long, the ovary is about 1 mm (0.04 in) long.

The fruit is a globose to ellipsoid drupe, yellow, orange or red, and measuring up to 3 cm (1.2 in) long and 1.5 cm (0.59 in) wide. It contains a single brown ellipsoid seed up to 2.5 cm (0.98 in) long and 1.2 cm (0.47 in) wide.

== Distribution and habitat ==
In Australia, it inhabits rainforest on various soil types along the coast and adjacent ranges from the Cooktown area, south to about Cardwell, and up to about 1,300 m (4,300 ft) above sea level. In New Guinea, there are two records of collections, one each in Papua New Guinea and Western New Guinea.

== Taxonomy ==
The species was first described by botanist Cyril Tenison White in 1933, based on material collected in north Queensland by Sethrick Francis Kajewski, an Australian plant collector who had been engaged by the Arnold Arboretum to collect specimens from the Pacific islands. White published the name in the book Ligneous plants collected for the Arnold Arboretum in North Queensland by S. F. Kajewski in 1929.

== Conservation ==
This species was assessed by the International Union for Conservation of Nature (IUCN) in 2018 and found to be of least concern. It is also rated as least concern by the Queensland Government under its Nature Conservation Act. In its statement, the IUCN cites the lack of any perceived threat to the species, as well as a wide distribution and large population, as the basis for the assessment.

== Ecology ==
Fruit are eaten by cassowaries, king parrots, pied imperial pigeons and musky rat-kangaroos.
