= Endiandra dielsiana =

Conservation status
- Least Concern (IUCN 3.1)

Scientific classification
- Kingdom: Plantae
- Clade: Tracheophytes
- Clade: Angiosperms
- Clade: Magnoliids
- Order: Laurales
- Family: Lauraceae
- Genus: Endiandra
- Species: E. dielsiana

Binomial name
- Endiandra dielsiana Teschner

Synonyms
- Beilschmiedia pustulata Kosterm.; Endiandra glandulosa C.K.Allen

Species of flowering plant

Endiandra dielsiana, commonly known as candle walnut, is a species of plant in the family Lauraceae native to New Guinea and Queensland, Australia. It is a rainforest tree, first described in 1923. It has a conservation status of least concern.

== Description ==
Endiandra dielsiana is a large tree that can reach 35 m (115 ft) in height and 120 cm (47 in) diameter. The trunk is often buttressed. The leaves are quite variable in shape, from linear to lanceolate, elliptic or ovate. They measure from 7 to 16 cm (2.8 to 6.3 in) long and from 2 to 6 cm (0.79 to 2.36 in) wide and have 6–14 pairs of lateral veins. The upperside is green, the underside is glaucous, and domatia are absent.

The inflorescence is a panicle emerging from the leaf axils. Flowers are yellowish to pale green and they are faintly scented; they have six tepals up to 2 mm (0.08 in) long. The fruit is an ellipsoid drupe, black, about 4 cm (1.6 in) long and 2.5 cm (0.98 in) wide. It contains a single brown seed about 3.4 cm (1.3 in) long and 2.2 cm (0.9 in) wide.

== Distribution ==
It is found in New Guinea and along the east coast of Queensland from near Lockhart River to Eungella National Park. It grows in rainforest on various soil types at altitudes from 150 m (490 ft) to about 1,200 m (3,900 ft).

== Conservation ==
This species was assessed by the International Union for Conservation of Nature (IUCN) in 2018 and found to be of least-concern. It is also rated as least-concern by the Queensland Government under its Nature Conservation Act. In its statement, the IUCN cites the lack of any perceived threat to the species, as well as a wide distribution and large population, as the basis for the assessment.

== Uses ==
This is a large tree which produces a good quality general purpose timber. It is sold under the name "candle walnut".
