= Rose walnut =

Rose walnut is a common name for several flowering plants in the family Lauraceae, in a different family and order from true walnut trees, and may refer to:

- Cryptocarya erythroxylon, native to Australia
- Endiandra discolor, native to Australia
