= Syzygium armstrongii =

Conservation status
- Data Deficient (IUCN 3.1)

Scientific classification
- Kingdom: Plantae
- Clade: Tracheophytes
- Clade: Angiosperms
- Clade: Eudicots
- Clade: Rosids
- Order: Myrtales
- Family: Myrtaceae
- Genus: Syzygium
- Species: S. armstrongii

Binomial name
- Syzygium armstrongii (Benth.) B.Hyland

Synonyms
- Eugenia armstrongii Benth.

Species of flowering plant

Syzygium armstrongii is a species of tree in the family Myrtaceae. It is endemic to the Northern Territory and the Kimberley of Western Australia.

== Description ==
It grows as a perennial, and can reach heights of up to 20 metres. It flowers from September to December and fruits in January. It has elliptical shaped leaves as well as bacciferous and/or drupaceous fruit.
