= Endiandra dichrophylla =

- Herbarium specimen

Conservation status
- Least Concern (IUCN 3.1)

Scientific classification
- Kingdom: Plantae
- Clade: Tracheophytes
- Clade: Angiosperms
- Clade: Magnoliids
- Order: Laurales
- Family: Lauraceae
- Genus: Endiandra
- Species: E. dichrophylla

Binomial name
- Endiandra dichrophylla F.Muell.

Species of flowering plant

Endiandra dichrophylla, commonly known as coach walnut, is a species of plant in the family Lauraceae native to Queensland, Australia. It is a rainforest tree, first described in 1892. It has a conservation status of least concern.

== Description ==
Endiandra dichrophylla is a tree that may grow to about 20 m (66 ft) in height and 40 cm (16 in) diameter. The trunk is often buttressed and often produces coppice shoots. The leaves are hairless and measure about 10 cm (3.9 in) long and 4 cm (1.6 in) wide and have 7–11 pairs of lateral veins. The upperside is green, the underside is glaucous, and domatia are absent.

The inflorescence is a panicle emerging from the leaf axils. Flowers are cream to pale brown to pale green and they may be faintly scented; they have six tepals up to 2 mm (0.08 in) long. The fruit is an ellipsoid drupe, dark blue or black, about 2.8 cm (1.1 in) long and 1.2 cm (0.5 in) wide. It contains a single brown seed about 26 mm (1.0 in) long and 10 mm (0.4 in) wide.

== Distribution ==
It occurs on the Atherton Tableland and nearby areas. It grows in mature rainforest at altitudes from 50 to 1,200 m (160 to 3,940 ft).

== Conservation ==
This species was assessed by the International Union for Conservation of Nature (IUCN) in 2019 and found to be of least-concern. It is also rated as least-concern by the Queensland Government under its Nature Conservation Act. In its statement, the IUCN cites the lack of any perceived threat to the species, as well as a wide distribution and large population, as the basis for the assessment.
