= Endiandra glauca =

- Herbarium specimen

Conservation status
- Least Concern (IUCN 3.1)

Scientific classification
- Kingdom: Plantae
- Clade: Tracheophytes
- Clade: Angiosperms
- Clade: Magnoliids
- Order: Laurales
- Family: Lauraceae
- Genus: Endiandra
- Species: E. glauca

Binomial name
- Endiandra glauca R.Br.

Synonyms
- Endiandra merrilliana C.K.Allen

Species of flowering plant

Endiandra glauca, commonly known as brown walnut, is a species of plant in the family Lauraceae native to New Guinea and Queensland, Australia. It is a rainforest tree, first described in 1810. It has a conservation status of least concern.

== Description ==
Endiandra glauca is a tree that grows up to 20 m (66 ft) tall with a trunk up to 25 cm (9.8 in) diameter. The bark is usually nondescript and buttresses are absent. The leaves may grow to 11 cm (4.3 in) long and 5 cm (2.0 in) with 4–9 pairs of lateral veins. The upperside is green, the underside is glaucous and covered in pale to brown appressed hairs. The midrib is sunken in the upper surface, and domatia are absent.

The inflorescence is a panicle emerging from the leaf axils. Flowers are pale cream, green or brown and without fragrance; they have six tepals up to 2 mm (0.08 in) long. The fruit is an ellipsoid drupe, dark blue or purple to black, glaucous, and measuring about 25 mm (1.0 in) long and 14 mm (0.55 in) wide. It contains a single brown seed about 23 m (75.5 ft) long and 11 mm (0.4 in) wide.

== Distribution ==
It is found in New Guinea and in Cape York Peninsula, Queensland, as far south as the Daintree River. It grows in and near rainforest on various soil types, at altitudes from sea level to about 500 m (1,600 ft).

== Conservation ==
This species was assessed by the International Union for Conservation of Nature (IUCN) in 2019 and found to be of least-concern. It is also rated as least-concern by the Queensland Government under its Nature Conservation Act. In its statement, the IUCN cites the lack of any perceived threat to the species, as well as a wide distribution and large population, as the basis for the assessment.
