= Endiandra phaeocarpa =

- Endiandra phaeocarpa botanical sketch

Conservation status
- Least Concern (NCA)

Scientific classification
- Kingdom: Plantae
- Clade: Tracheophytes
- Clade: Angiosperms
- Clade: Magnoliids
- Order: Laurales
- Family: Lauraceae
- Genus: Endiandra
- Species: E. phaeocarpa

Binomial name
- Endiandra phaeocarpa B.Hyland

Species of flowering plant

Endiandra phaeocarpa is a species of plant in the family Lauraceae, first described in 1989. It is a large rainforest tree native to northeast Queensland, Australia, and has a conservation status of least concern.

== Description ==
Endiandra phaeocarpa is a large rainforest tree that can reach up to 30 m (98 ft) tall with a trunk up 60 cm (24 in) diameter. Larger trees may produce buttresses. The young twigs are fluted and finely hairy when young. Leaves are glossy green and are generally about 13 cm (5.1 in) long and 6 cm (2.4 in) wide. The midrib is flush with or sunken in the upper surface and there are between 6 and 10 pairs of secondary veins branching from it. The petiole averages about 1.6 cm (0.63 in) long and domatia are absent.

Inflorescences emerge from the leaf axils or from the twigs beneath the leaves. The cream or yellowish flowers are lightly scented. They have six tepals in two whorls, each about 1 mm (0.04 in) long.

The fruit is a brown drupe with a felt-like surface, measuring up to 9 cm (3.5 in) long and 5 cm (2.0 in) wide. It contains a single brown seed up to 7 cm (2.8 in) long and 4 cm (1.6 in) wide.

== Distribution ==
It occurs in upland rainforest between 600 and 1,100 m (2,000 and 3,600 ft) above sea level, and is restricted to the area from Cape Tribulation to Mount Lewis National Park. It grows on soils derived from granite.

== Taxonomy ==
The species was first described in 1989 by Australian botanist Bernard Hyland, in his 367-page revision of the Lauraceae family in Australia.

== Conservation ==
This species is listed as least concern in the Queensland Government's WildNet database. As of October 2026, it has not been assessed by the International Union for Conservation of Nature.
