= Endiandra cooperana =

- Botanical illustration

Conservation status
- Endangered (NCA)

Scientific classification
- Kingdom: Plantae
- Clade: Tracheophytes
- Clade: Angiosperms
- Clade: Magnoliids
- Order: Laurales
- Family: Lauraceae
- Genus: Endiandra
- Species: E. cooperana

Binomial name
- Endiandra cooperana B.Hyland

Species of flowering plant

Endiandra cooperana is a species of plant in the family Lauraceae native to northeast Queensland, Australia. It is a rainforest tree, first described in 1989. It has a conservation status of endangered.

== Description ==
Endiandra cooperana is a tree that may grow to about 25 m (82 ft) in height and 40 cm (16 in) diameter. The trunk is often buttressed and the bark is nondescript. The leaves are generally about 11 cm (4.3 in) long and 4 cm (1.6 in) wide and have 5–7 pairs of lateral veins. The upperside is green, the underside is green and finely hairy when young, hairless when mature; there may be foveoles in the junctions of the lateral veins with the mid vein.

The inflorescence is a panicle emerging from the leaf axils. Flowers are yellow and scented; they have six tepals up to 3 mm (0.12 in) long. The fruit is an ellipsoid drupe, yellow green to orange, about 5 cm (2.0 in) long and wide. It contains a single brown seed about 4 to 4.5 cm (1.6 to 1.8 in) long and wide.

== Distribution ==
It is restricted to the small area from Cape Tribulation to the Daintree River, and up to 10 m (33 ft) above sea level. It grows in well-developed rainforest.

== Taxonomy ==
The species was first described in 1989 by Australian botanist Bernard Hyland, in his 367-page revision of the Lauraceae family in Australia. The description was based on material collected by Bruce Gray from the Daintree lowlands in 1979.

== Ecology ==
The fruit of this species is eaten by cassowaries, parrots and mammals.

== Conservation ==
This species is listed as endangered in the Queensland Government's WildNet database. As of September 2026, the International Union for Conservation of Nature has not assessed it.
