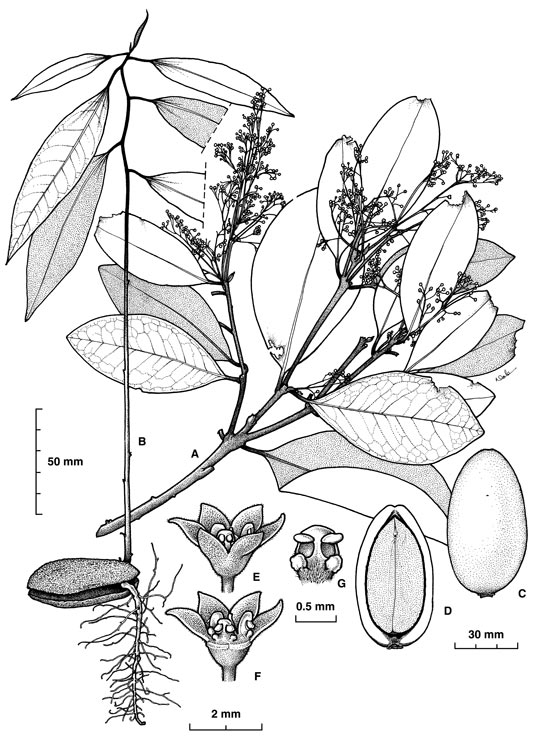
- Botanical sketch

Conservation status
- Near Threatened (NCA)

Scientific classification
- Kingdom: Plantae
- Clade: Tracheophytes
- Clade: Angiosperms
- Clade: Magnoliids
- Order: Laurales
- Family: Lauraceae
- Genus: Endiandra
- Species: E. microneura

Binomial name
- Endiandra microneura C.T.White

Synonyms
- Endiandra reticulata C.T.White nom. illeg.

= Endiandra microneura =

Species of flowering plant

Endiandra microneura, commonly known as Noah's walnut, is a species of plant in the family Lauraceae, first described in 1948. It is native to a small part of the Wet Tropics bioregion of Queensland, Australia. It grows in rainforest and has a conservation status of near-threatened.

== Description ==
Endiandra microneura is a buttressed tree growing up to 30 m (98 ft) tall. The young twigs are fluted and finely hairy but become hairless when older. Leaves are glossy green, arranged alternately on either side of the twigs and measure up to 15 cm (5.9 in) long and 6.5 cm (2.6 in) wide. Oil dots are present and visible with a hand lens.

Inflorescences take the form of a panicle and emerge from the leaf axils. The flowers are very small, with six tepals about 1 mm (0.04 in) long. The flowers are cream or white and fragrant. Anthers are about 0.6 mm long and attached by a filament about 0.1 mm long. The ovary is about 0.7 mm long and wide.

The fruit is a glossy, ovoid, yellow or orange drupe measuring up to 8 cm (3.1 in) long and 6.5 cm (2.6 in) wide. It contains a single brown ellipsoid seed up to 6.5 cm (2.6 in) long and 4.5 cm (1.8 in) wide.

== Distribution and habitat ==
Noah's walnut is mostly restricted to lowland areas between the Daintree River and Cape Tribulation, with a handful of occurrences being recorded from other parts of the Daintree National Park. It is estimated that the area of occupancy (Note: For a definition of Area of Occupancy see this page at the Atlas of Living Australia) is about 108 km^{2} (42 sq mi). The species grows in rainforest on metamorphic soils.

== Taxonomy ==
This species was first described by Cyril Tenison White in 1936 as Endiandra reticulata. He later had to rename it when it was found that the combination had already been used for a species from Fiji. In 1948 he published a brief note in the journal Proceedings of the Royal Society of Queensland, assigning the new species epithet 'microneura' to the taxon.

In his review of Australian Lauraceae published in 1989, botanist Bernard Hyland placed this species in a group of 12 other Endiandra species that bore no close relationship to any of the other nine groups that he found in the genus.

== Conservation ==
This species is listed as near-threatened in the Queensland Government's WildNet database. As of 22 August 2026, it has not been assessed by the International Union for Conservation of Nature.

== Gallery ==
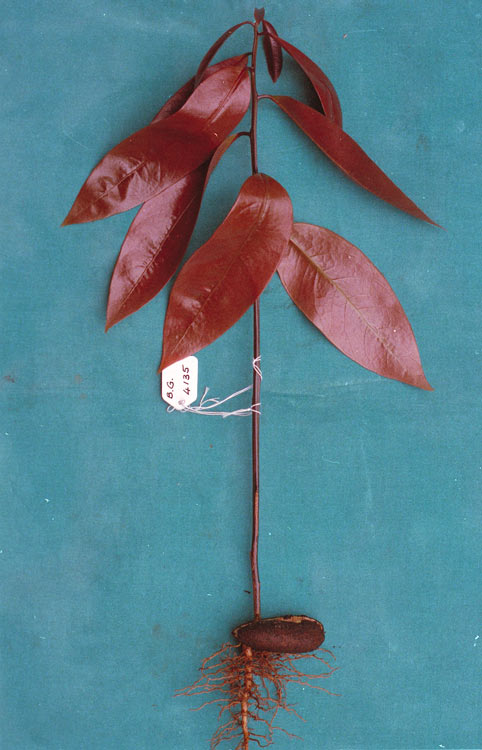
Seedling

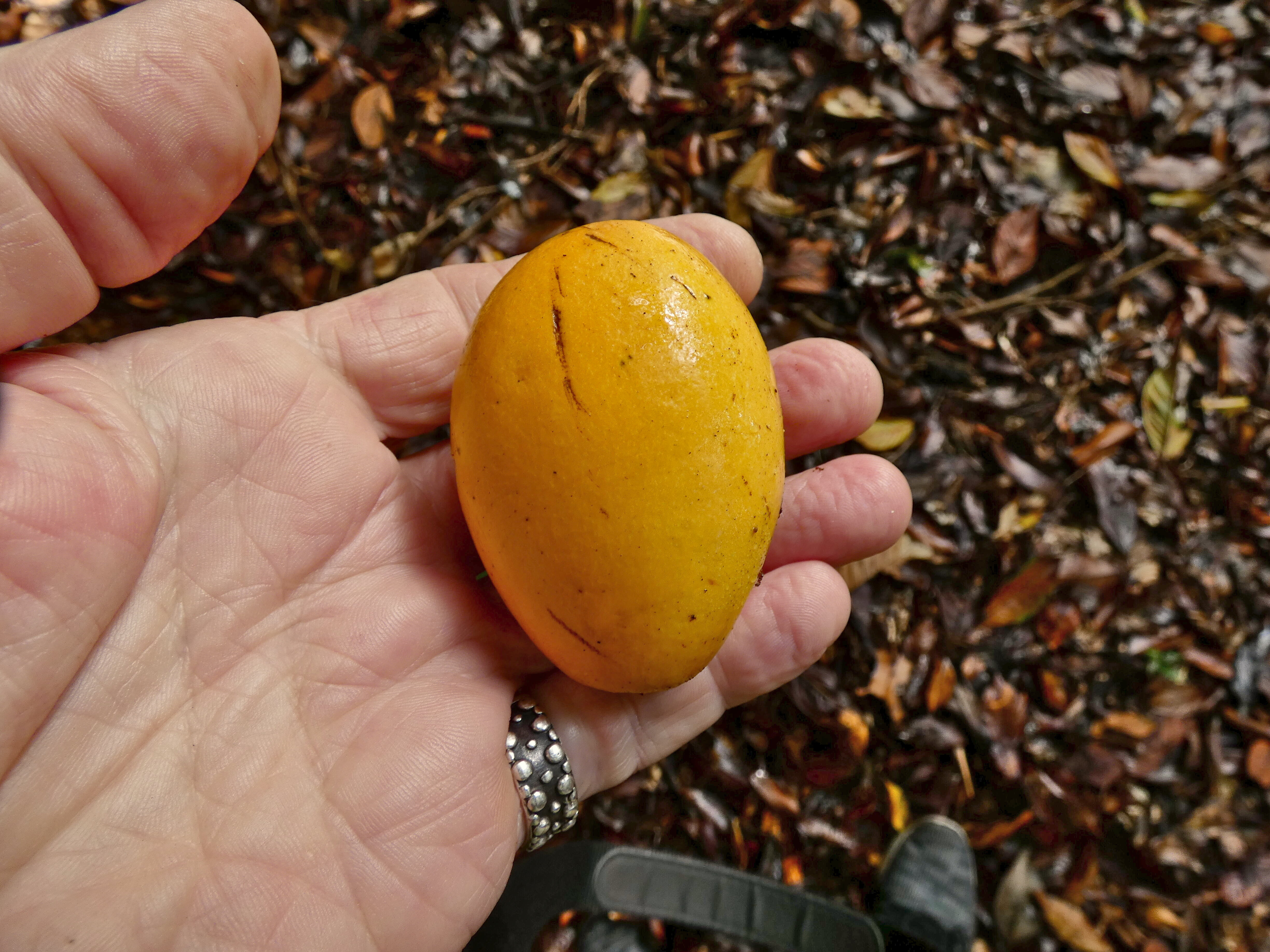
Fruit

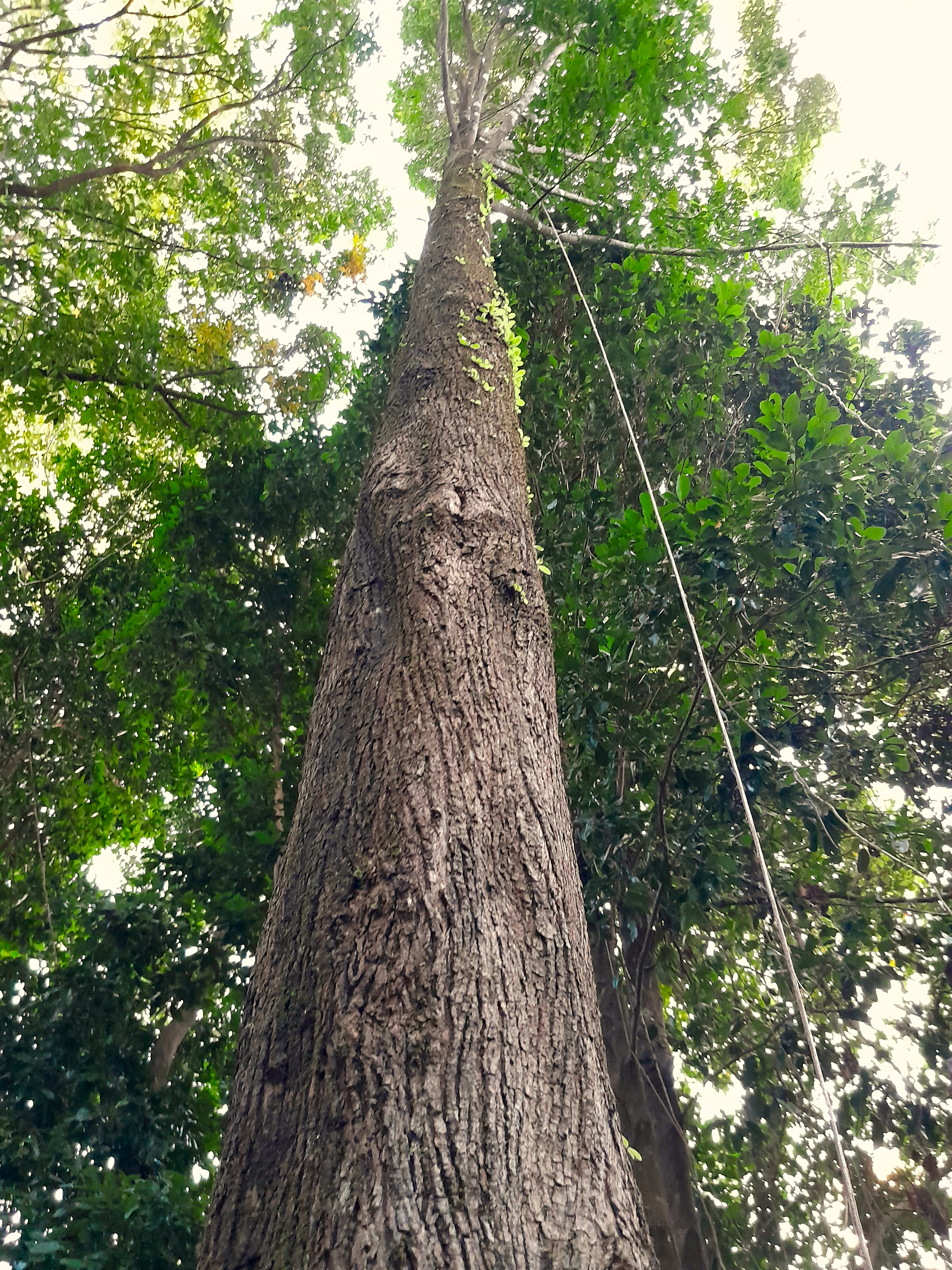
Tree in Cairns Botanic Gardens
