= Endiandra longipedicellata =

- Herbarium specimen

Conservation status
- Least Concern (IUCN 3.1)

Scientific classification
- Kingdom: Plantae
- Clade: Tracheophytes
- Clade: Angiosperms
- Clade: Magnoliids
- Order: Laurales
- Family: Lauraceae
- Genus: Endiandra
- Species: E. longipedicellata

Binomial name
- Endiandra longipedicellata C.T.White & W.D.Francis

Species of flowering plant

Endiandra longipedicellata is a species of plant in the family Lauraceae native to northeast Queensland, Australia. It is a rainforest tree, first described in 1920, with a conservation status of least concern.

== Description ==
Endiandra longipedicellata is a tree that may grow to about 30 m (98 ft) in height and 70 cm (28 in) diameter. The trunk is often buttressed and the bark is nondescript. The leaves are generally about 12 cm (4.7 in) long and 5 cm (2.0 in) wide and have 5–9 pairs of lateral veins. The upperside is green, the underside slightly glaucous. The midrib is flush with the upper surface of the leaf blade. The petiole averages about 9 mm (0.4 in) long, and domatia are absent.

The inflorescence is a panicle emerging from the leaf axils and extending beyond the leaves. Flowers are green or olive green. They are unscented and have six tepals (two whorls of three each) about 4 mm (0.157 in) long. The fruit is an ellipsoid drupe, dark blue or black, glaucous, up to 5 cm (2.0 in) long and 2.7 cm (1.1 in) wide. It contains a single brown seed about 42 mm (1.7 in) long and 21 mm (0.8 in) wide.

== Distribution ==
It is found from the top of Cape York Peninsula to the area around Ingham. It grows on various soil types in rainforest and drier forests such as gallery forest and monsoon forest, and up to 700 m (2,300 ft) above sea level.

== Ecology ==
The fruit of E. longipedicellata is eaten by cassowaries.

== Conservation ==
This species was assessed by the International Union for Conservation of Nature (IUCN) in 2018 and found to be of least-concern. It is also rated as least-concern by the Queensland Government under its Nature Conservation Act. In its statement, the IUCN cites the lack of any perceived threat to the species, as well as a wide distribution and large population, as the basis for the assessment.

== Uses ==
The timber produced by this tree is sold as a general purpose timber under the name "buff walnut". It has a density of 975 kg/m³.
