= Endiandra insignis =

- Herbarium specimen

Conservation status
- Least Concern (IUCN 3.1)

Scientific classification
- Kingdom: Plantae
- Clade: Tracheophytes
- Clade: Angiosperms
- Clade: Magnoliids
- Order: Laurales
- Family: Lauraceae
- Genus: Endiandra
- Species: E. insignis

Binomial name
- Endiandra insignis (F.M.Bailey) F.M.Bailey

Synonyms
- Cryptocarya insignis F.M.Bailey; Endiandra exostemonea F.Muell.

Species of flowering plant

Endiandra insignis, commonly known as hairy walnut, is a species of plant in the family Lauraceae native to Queensland, Australia. It is a rainforest tree, first described in 1892. It has a conservation status of least concern.

== Description ==
Endiandra insignis is a tree that grows up to 25 m (82 ft) in height and 80 cm (31 in) diameter. The trunk is often buttressed on more mature trees but not on smaller ones. The leaves are generally about 16 cm (6.3 in) long and 7 cm (2.8 in) wide and have 5–9 pairs of lateral veins. They are green on both sides, but the underside has a fine covering of reddish brown hairs. The midrib is flush with the upper surface of the blade and domatia are absent.

The inflorescence is a panicle growing from the leaf axils, and often from the twigs below the leaves. Flowers are cream to green and scented; they have six tepals up to 1 mm (0.04 in) long. The fruits are a roughly spherical drupe, ranging from yellow or pink to orange-red or red. They measure up to 9 cm (3.5 in) long and 10 cm (3.9 in) wide, and they contain a single brown seed about 5.5 cm (2.2 in) long and 5 cm (2.0 in) wide, with a conspicuous knob at the apex.

== Distribution ==
The species grows in rainforest and is widespread within coastal and sub-coastal areas of Queensland from about Rossville to Tully, at altitudes up to 1,000 m (3,300 ft). It grows on various soil types but has a preference for those derived from basalt.

== Ecology ==
Fruit

Fruits of the tree are eaten by musky rat-kangaroos, cassowaries, and white-tailed rats and other native rodents.

== Conservation ==
This species was assessed by the International Union for Conservation of Nature (IUCN) in 2023 and found to be of least-concern. It is also listed as least-concern in the Queensland Government's WildNet database. In its statement, the IUCN cites the lack of any perceived threat to the species, as well as a wide distribution and large population, as the basis for the assessment.

== Uses ==
The tree produces a good quality general purpose timber which is sold under the name "hairy walnut".
