= Brown laurel =

Brown laurel may refer to a number of tree species:

- Cryptocarya glaucescens
- Cryptocarya triplinervis
- Endiandra acuminata
