= Endiandra bessaphila =

- Botanical illustration

Conservation status
- Least Concern (IUCN 3.1)

Scientific classification
- Kingdom: Plantae
- Clade: Tracheophytes
- Clade: Angiosperms
- Clade: Magnoliids
- Order: Laurales
- Family: Lauraceae
- Genus: Endiandra
- Species: E. bessaphila

Binomial name
- Endiandra bessaphila B.Hyland

Species of flowering plant

Endiandra bessaphila, commonly known as gully walnut or blush walnut, is a species of plant in the family Lauraceae native to northeast Queensland, Australia. It is a rainforest tree, first described in 1989. It has a conservation status of least concern.

== Description ==
Endiandra bessaphila is a tree that may grow to about 35 m (115 ft) in height and 60 cm (24 in) diameter. The trunk is often buttressed and the bark is nondescript. The leaves are generally about 11 cm (4.3 in) long and 5 cm (2.0 in) wide and have 6–11 pairs of lateral veins. The underside is green but in rare cases may be glaucous; there are foveoles in the junctions of the lateral veins with the mid vein.

The inflorescence is a panicle emerging from the leaf axils. Flowers are green to cream and faintly scented; they have six tepals about 1 mm (0.04 in) long. The fruit is a glossy black ellipsoid drupe up to 3.4 cm (1.3 in) long and 2 cm (0.79 in) wide containing a single brown seed.

== Distribution ==
This species is widespread in rainforest from the area around Rossville to Mount Elliot near Townsville. It grows on a variety of soils, frequently in gullies, at altitudes from 150 m (490 ft) to 1,100 m (3,600 ft).

== Conservation ==
As of September 2026, this species has been assessed to be of least concern by the International Union for Conservation of Nature (IUCN) and by the Queensland Government in its Wildnet database.
