= Endiandra inopinata =

- Herbarium specimen

Conservation status
- Endangered (IUCN 3.1)
- Least Concern (NCA)

Scientific classification
- Kingdom: Plantae
- Clade: Tracheophytes
- Clade: Angiosperms
- Clade: Magnoliids
- Order: Laurales
- Family: Lauraceae
- Genus: Endiandra
- Species: E. inopinata

Binomial name
- Endiandra inopinata B.Gray

Species of flowering plant

Endiandra inopinata is a species of plant in the family Lauraceae native to Queensland, Australia. It is a rainforest tree, first described in 2020, which is restricted to remote highland forest of the Wet Tropics region.

== Description ==
Endiandra inopinata is a small understory tree that grows up to 12 m (39 ft) in height and 15 cm (5.9 in) diameter. It is often multi-stemmed and/or with coppice shoots, and buttresses are absent. The leaves are hairless above and have a covering of pale brown hairs below. They measure up to 14.5 cm (5.7 in) long and 6.5 cm (2.6 in) wide, with 5–8 pairs of lateral veins. The midrib is flush with the upper surface.

The inflorescence is a panicle emerging from the leaf axils. Flowers are green and have six tepals in two whorls, the outer whorl slightly longer than the inner one at about 1.5 mm (0.06 in) long. The fruit is wider than long, yellow/orange in colour, up to 27 mm (1.1 in) long and 36 mm (1.4 in) wide. It contains a single seed up to 21 mm (0.8 in) long and 25 mm (1.0 in) wide.

== Distribution ==
It grows in mature rainforest of very wet rainforest, at altitudes from 250 to 1,100 m (820 to 3,610 ft). Collections have been made in two locations within Mount Lewis National Park, as well as on Mount Sorrow near Cape Tribulation. These areas are difficult to access, and it is thought that the species may occur in a wider area than what is currently known.

== Conservation ==
This species was assessed by the International Union for Conservation of Nature (IUCN) in 2026 and found to be endangered. It is rated as least-concern by the Queensland Government under its Nature Conservation Act. In its statement, the IUCN states that the environment where the plant grows is "under threat of forest fires". This, and the fact that it occurs only in three known locations (albeit all within the protected Wet Tropics World Heritage Area), form the basis for the assessment. The Queensland Government does not provide any explanation for its conservation assessments.
