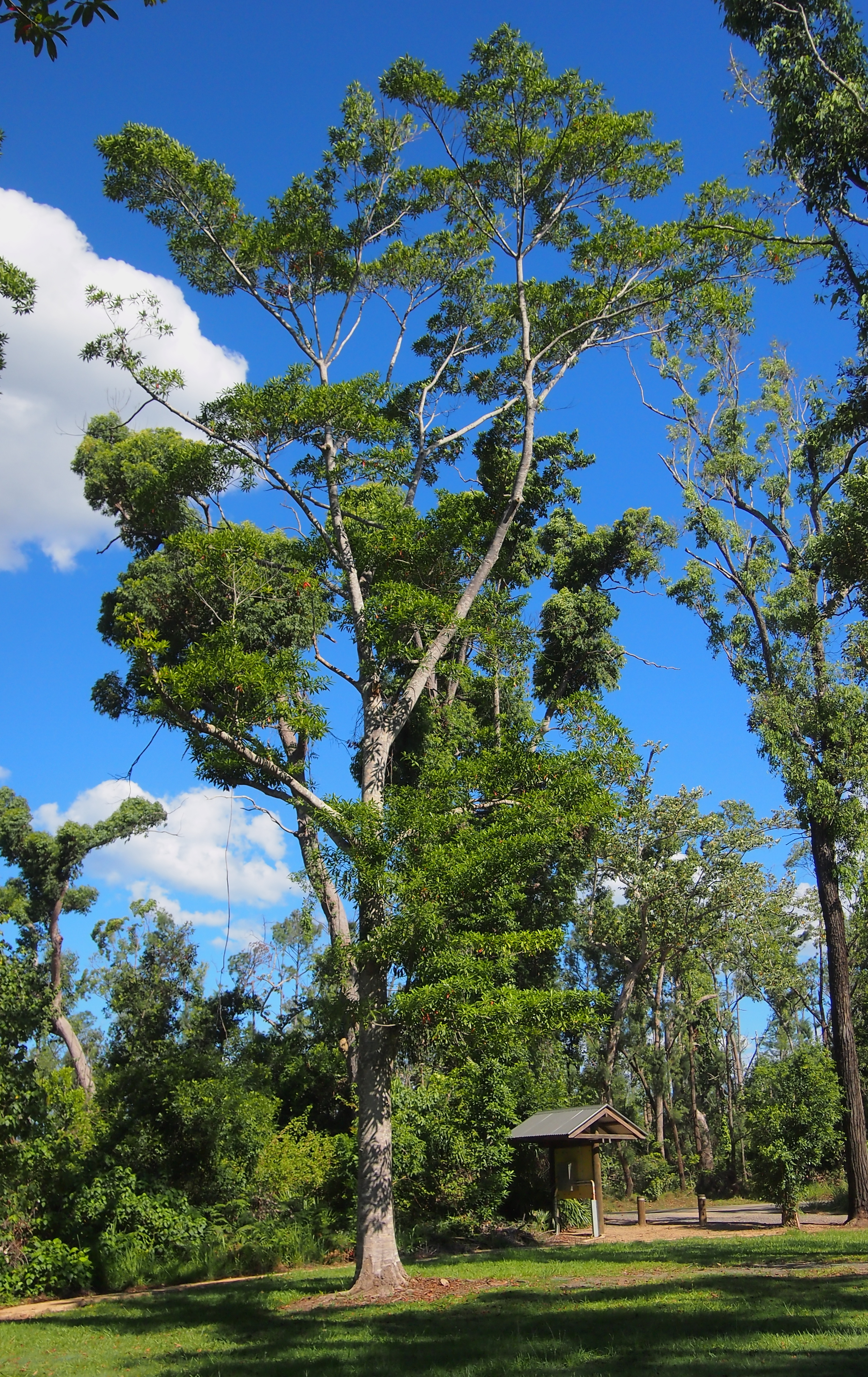

Conservation status
- Least Concern (IUCN 3.1)

Scientific classification
- Kingdom: Plantae
- Clade: Tracheophytes
- Clade: Angiosperms
- Clade: Magnoliids
- Order: Laurales
- Family: Lauraceae
- Genus: Endiandra
- Species: E. discolor

Binomial name
- Endiandra discolor Benth.

= Endiandra discolor =

Species of flowering plant

Endiandra discolor is a tree in the family Lauraceae, native to eastern Australia from central New South Wales to northeastern Queensland. Common names include rose walnut and domatia tree. It grows in tropical, subtropical or warm temperate rainforest, particularly on the poorer volcanic soil types, and alluvial soil near streams. It was first described in 1870, and has been given the conservation status of least concern.

== Description ==
Endiandra discolor is a tree up to 25 m (82 ft) tall and very often buttressed. The bark is brown or brownish grey, smooth on younger trees. The bark of older trees is rougher, with small depressions in the bark which are sometimes inhabited by insects. Twigs and new shoots are covered with fine pale brown to white hairs, and twigs are fluted.

The leaves are simple and arranged alternately on the twigs, measuring up to 10 cm (3.9 in) long and 5 cm (2.0 in) wide. They are glabrous above and dull grey-green to white below, and held on a petiole (leaf stalk) up to 10 mm (0.4 in) long. They are elliptic to ovate with 3–7 lateral veins either side of the midrib, and conspicuous foveoles at their junction with the midrib.

Inflorescences are panicles produced in the leaf axils and are shorter than or as long as the leaves. The scented, creamy green flowers are small and pubescent, measuring about 2 mm (0.1 in) long and 5 mm (0.2 in) wide, with three inner and three outer tepals.

The fruit is a shiny black drupe, about 17 mm (0.7 in) long and 13 mm (0.5 in) wide, containing a single brown seed about 14 mm (0.6 in) long by 9 mm (0.4 in) wide. The thin flesh is green, the cut seed is cream to pink. Like many Australian laurels, the seed is slightly ribbed.

== Taxonomy ==
The species was first described by English botanist George Bentham in 1870, and published in his book Flora australiensis: a description of the plants of the Australian territory.

== Conservation ==
As of November 2024, this species has been assessed to be of least concern by the International Union for Conservation of Nature (IUCN) and by the Queensland Government under its Nature Conservation Act.

== Ecology ==
Fruit are eaten by many rainforest birds, including the wompoo fruit dove, catbird, rose crowned fruit dove, superb fruit-dove and topknot pigeon. The leaves provide food for the larvae of the Macleay's swallowtail butterfly (Graphium macleayanum). The plant is also a larval host for the fruit fly, Bactrocera endiandrae.

== Gallery ==
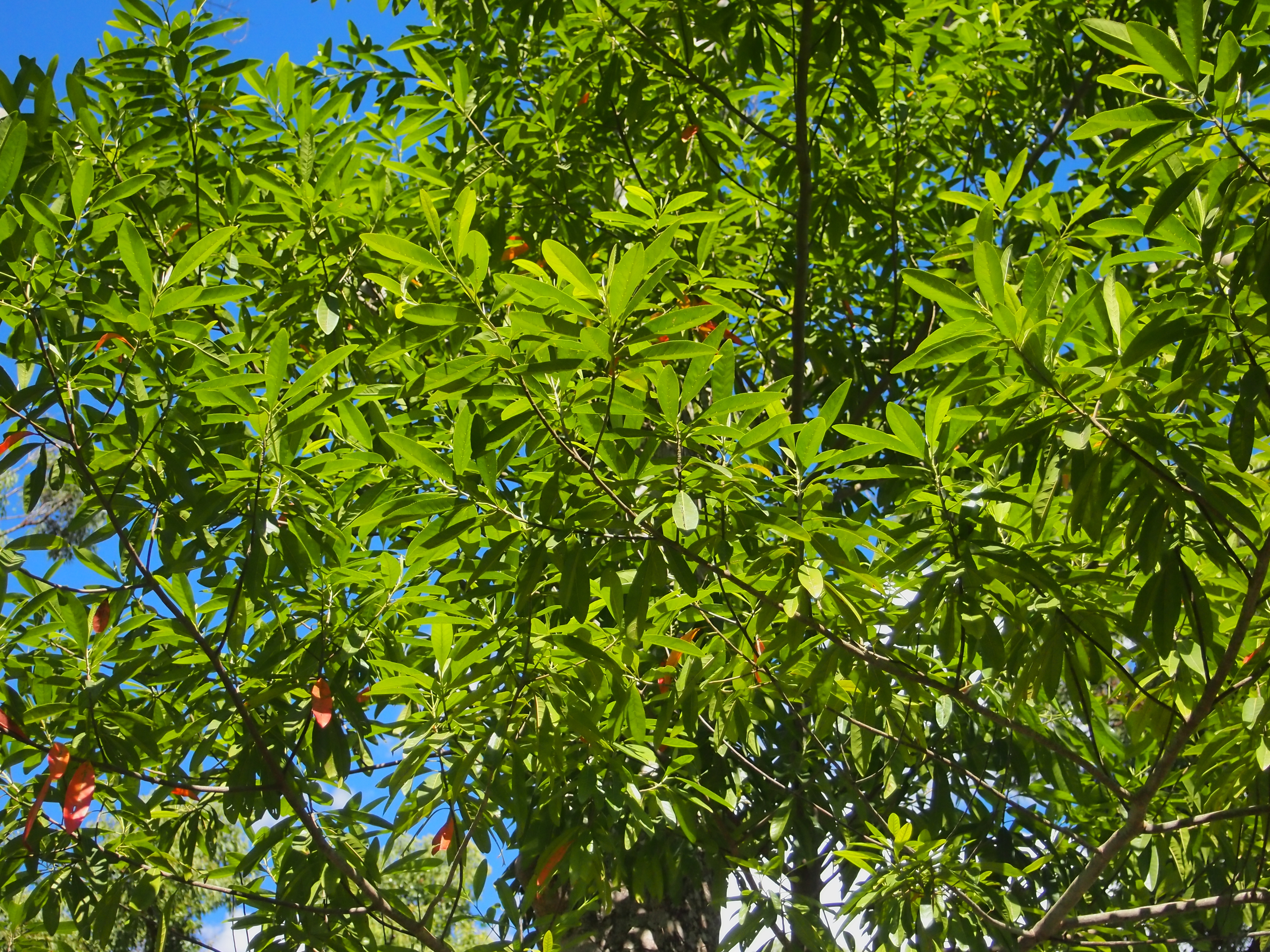
Foliage

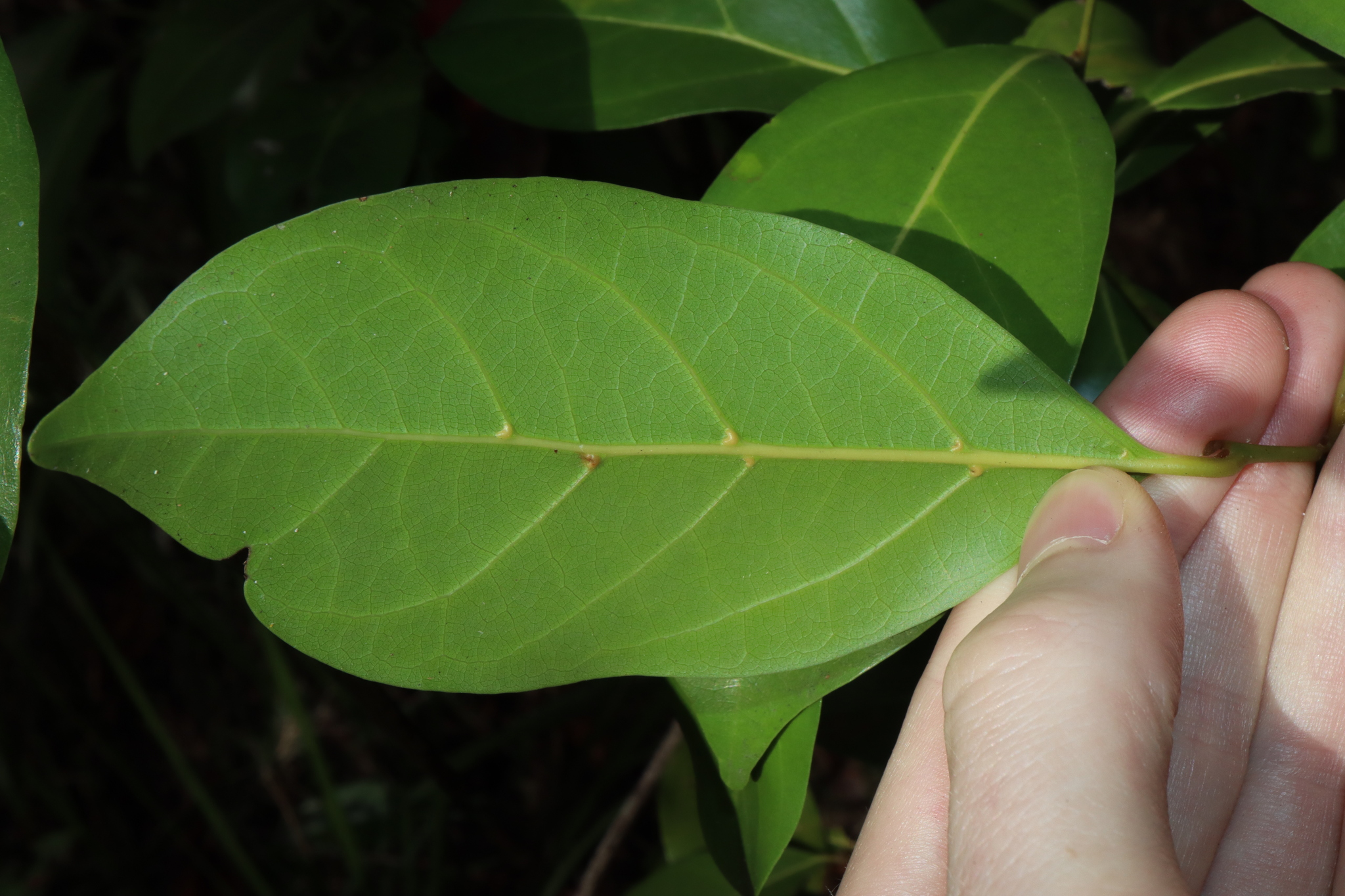
Underside of leaf showing conspicuous domatia

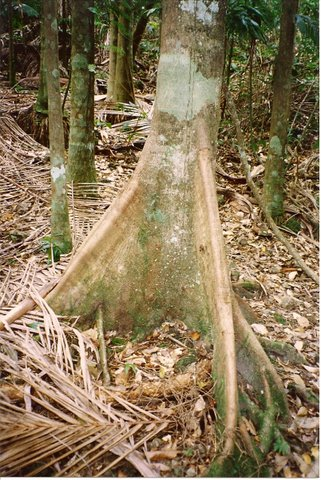
Trunk with buttrresses
