= Endiandra anthropophagorum =

- Inflorescence and foliage

Conservation status
- Vulnerable (NCA)

Scientific classification
- Kingdom: Plantae
- Clade: Tracheophytes
- Clade: Angiosperms
- Clade: Magnoliids
- Order: Laurales
- Family: Lauraceae
- Genus: Endiandra
- Species: E. anthropophagorum

Binomial name
- Endiandra anthropophagorum Domin

Species of flowering plant

Endiandra anthropophagorum is a species of plant in the family Lauraceae native to the Wet Tropics bioregion of Queensland, Australia. It was first described in 1926 and has a conservation status of vulnerable.

== Description ==
Endiandra anthropophagorum is a tree that may grow to a height of 8 m (26 ft) with simple leaves up to 16 cm (6.3 in) long and 8 cm (3.1 in)wide. The inflorescence is a panicle that emerges from the leaf axils. It carries numerous pale green to cream flowers which are about 1 mm (0.04 in) long. The fruit is a cream to red drupe about 6 cm (2.4 in) long and wide.

== Conservation status ==
It is rated as vulnerable by the Queensland Government under its Nature Conservation Act. As of 6 September 2026, it has not been assessed by the International Union for Conservation of Nature.
