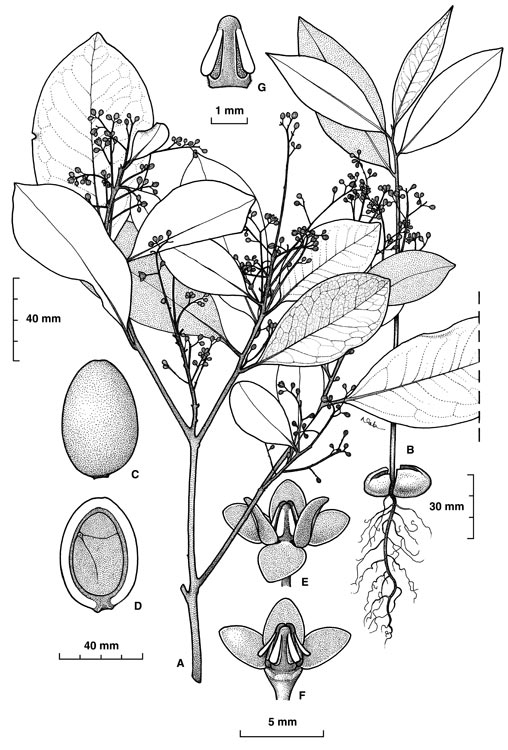

Conservation status
- Least Concern (NCA)
- Least Concern (IUCN 3.1)

Scientific classification
- Kingdom: Plantae
- Clade: Embryophytes
- Clade: Tracheophytes
- Clade: Angiosperms
- Clade: Magnoliids
- Order: Laurales
- Family: Lauraceae
- Genus: Endiandra
- Species: E. impressicosta

Binomial name
- Endiandra impressicosta C.K.Allen

= Endiandra impressicosta =

Species of flowering plant

Endiandra impressicosta is a species of tree in the family Lauraceae. Found in tropical rainforest in Queensland in Australia, also in southern New Guinea and the Aru Islands. This species may grow to 25 metres tall.
