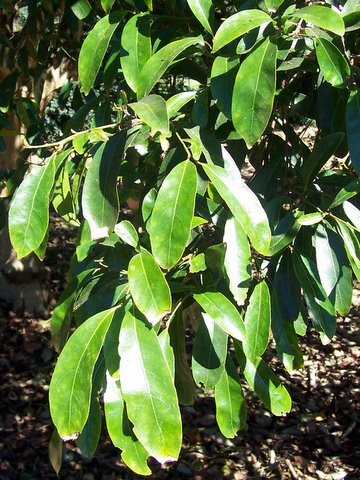
- Endiandra virens - mature leaves

Conservation status
- Least Concern (IUCN 3.1)

Scientific classification
- Kingdom: Plantae
- Clade: Tracheophytes
- Clade: Angiosperms
- Clade: Magnoliids
- Order: Laurales
- Family: Lauraceae
- Genus: Endiandra
- Species: E. virens

Binomial name
- Endiandra virens F.Muell. ex Meissner

Synonyms
- Endiandra lowiana F.M.Bailey

= Endiandra virens =

Species of tree

Endiandra virens is an Australian tree in the laurel family. Growing from Boorganna Nature Reserve north west of Taree, New South Wales to Kin Kin in Southern Queensland. Common names include white apple, plumwood, and New South Wales walnut.

Endiandra virens is an understorey rainforest tree. The habitat is various types of rainforest, usually on poorer soils at low elevations.

== Description ==
Endiandra virens is a small tree with bright green leaves and large fruit. Usually seven to ten metres tall with a trunk diameter of 20 cm. The bark is pale, often grey or whitish grey. The bark is not smooth, with vertical ridges, lines, and bumps, but somewhat soft and corky. New branchlets green and smooth, new shoots with small hairs.

=== Leaves ===
The leaves are alternate, not toothed. 6 to 15 cm long, 2 to 3 cm wide. Oblong or lanceolate in shape. Leaves are narrow at both ends. Leaf stem 3 to 12 mm long. Glossy green above, duller below. The specific name virens refers to the bright green of the new leaves.

The midrib, lateral veins and net veins are visible on both surfaces, raised and more evident under the leaf. Midrib raised under the leaf, somewhat depressed on the upper leaf surface.

=== Flowers and Fruit ===
Small cream flowers occur on panicles in the months of March to May. The panicle is shorter than a leaf.

The fruit matures from April to July, though sometimes as late as November. A very large globular drupe, 4 to 10 cm in diameter. Coloured yellow, orange or red when mature. The single seed is 3 to 4 cm in diameter. Removal of the fleshy aril is advised before planting the seeds.

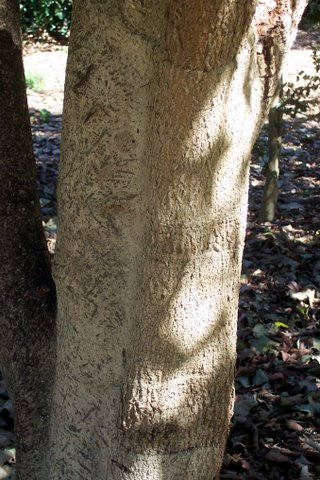
Endiandra virens - bark

=== Taxonomy ===
It is possible that the Queensland populations currently included as Endiandra virens between Caboolture and Kin Kin represent a distinct species once named Endiandra lowiana by F. M. Bailey in 1892. These plants differ in leaf and bark character from the NSW populations and are similar to a less hairy Endiandra pubens while NSW plants are quite dissimilar to E. pubens. The type specimen of Endiandra lowiana is from Maroochie (Yandina), While the type for Endiandra virens is from the Clarence River see (APNI) thus should the QLD populations prove to be a distinct species they would be called Endiandra lowiana while NSW populations would retain the name Endiandra virens. Genetic and more detailed morphological studies would help to clarify the status of these two taxa.
