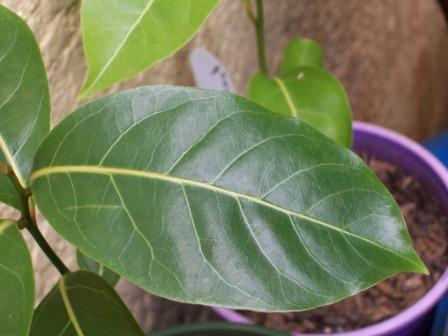

Conservation status
- Near Threatened (IUCN 3.1)

- Vulnerable (EPBC Act)

Scientific classification
- Kingdom: Plantae
- Clade: Tracheophytes
- Clade: Angiosperms
- Clade: Magnoliids
- Order: Laurales
- Family: Lauraceae
- Genus: Endiandra
- Species: E. globosa

Binomial name
- Endiandra globosa Maiden & Betche

= Endiandra globosa =

Species of tree

Endiandra globosa is a medium-sized Australian rainforest tree. Despite the common name of black walnut, this tree is unrelated to northern hemisphere walnuts, and is a laurel.

The black walnut is restricted to riverine rainforest. Growing on rich alluvial soils and on moist slopes in subtropical rainforest; in the Brunswick and Tweed valleys in New South Wales and adjacent areas in Queensland. Another population grows from Ingham to Cairns in tropical Queensland.

The black walnut is considered rare, with a ROTAP rating of 2RC-. Several signposted specimens can be seen on the roads around the town of Murwillumbah in north-eastern NSW.

== Description ==
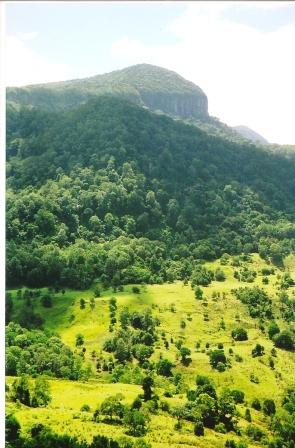
habitat of Endiandra globosa, NSW - Qld border

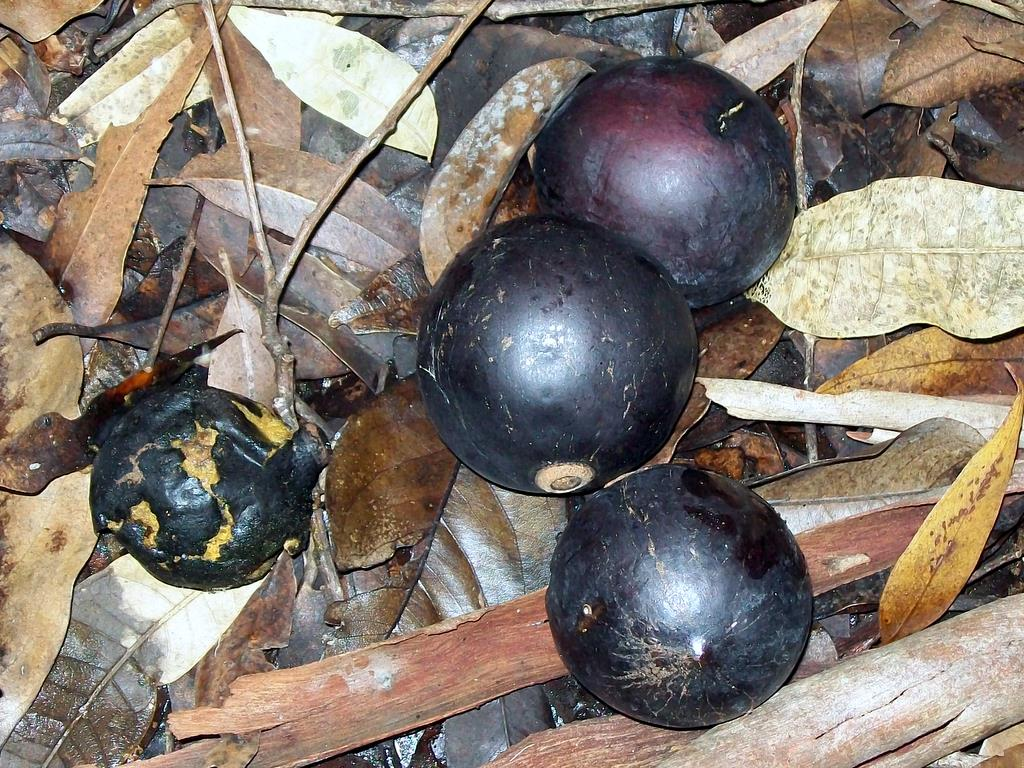
fallen fruit of Endiandra globosa

The unbuttressed trunk is of whitish, grey or brown bark. A mature tree grows to around to 25 metres tall.

Leaves are broad-elliptic to elliptic or ovate, veiny and usually 7–15 cm long, 3–6 cm wide, veins often yellowish. The horizontal form of the branches and attractive dark foliage makes this a particularly beautiful tree.

Creamy white flowers form between October and January. The fruit matures in autumn and is often the size of a tennis ball. The black, fleshy drupe contains a large woody seed, which itself has attractive veiny patterns. Germination is fairly slow but reliable. Roots and shoots appear around November.
