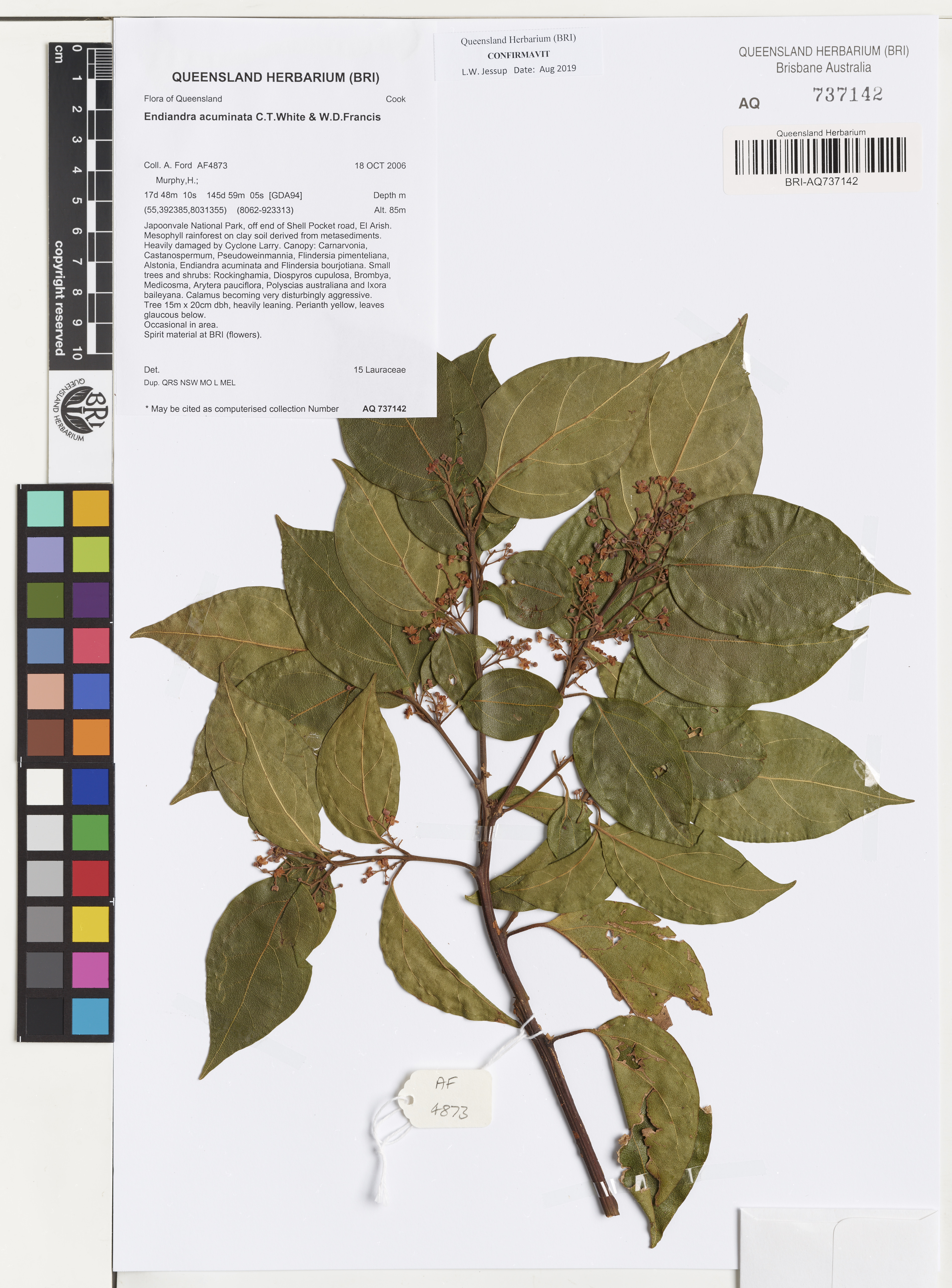
- Herbarium specimen

Conservation status
- Least Concern (IUCN 3.1)

Scientific classification
- Kingdom: Plantae
- Clade: Embryophytes
- Clade: Tracheophytes
- Clade: Angiosperms
- Clade: Magnoliids
- Order: Laurales
- Family: Lauraceae
- Genus: Endiandra
- Species: E. acuminata

Binomial name
- Endiandra acuminata C.T.White & W.D.Francis

Synonyms
- Endiandra subtriplinervis C.T.White

= Endiandra acuminata =

Species of flowering plant

Endiandra acuminata, commonly known as brown walnut, is a species of plant in the family Lauraceae. It is native to Queensland, Australia.

== Description ==
This is a tree growing up to 30 m (98 ft) tall with a buttressed trunk. It grows in rainforests of Queensland from Cooktown to Rockingham Bay usually on granite soils, from sea level up to about 1,000 m (3,300 ft).

== Conservation ==
As of August 2026, this species has been assessed to be of least concern by the International Union for Conservation of Nature and by the Queensland Government in its Wildnet database.
