= Endiandra hypotephra =

Conservation status
- Least Concern (IUCN 3.1)

Scientific classification
- Kingdom: Plantae
- Clade: Tracheophytes
- Clade: Angiosperms
- Clade: Magnoliids
- Order: Laurales
- Family: Lauraceae
- Genus: Endiandra
- Species: E. hypotephra

Binomial name
- Endiandra hypotephra F.Muell.

Species of flowering plant

Endiandra hypotephra, commonly known as blue walnut or northern rose walnut, is a species of flowering plant in the family Lauraceae. It is endemic to northeastern and eastern Queensland, Australia.
