= Endiandra wongawallanensis =

Conservation status
- Endangered (IUCN 3.1)

- Endangered (EPBC Act)

Scientific classification
- Kingdom: Plantae
- Clade: Embryophytes
- Clade: Tracheophytes
- Clade: Spermatophytes
- Clade: Angiosperms
- Clade: Magnoliids
- Order: Laurales
- Family: Lauraceae
- Genus: Endiandra
- Species: E. wongawallanensis

Binomial name
- Endiandra wongawallanensis L.Weber

Species of tree

Endiandra wongawallanensis is a rare rainforest tree found in south eastern Queensland, Australia.
