= Endiandra cowleyana =

- Herbarium specimen

Conservation status
- Least Concern (IUCN 3.1)

Scientific classification
- Kingdom: Plantae
- Clade: Tracheophytes
- Clade: Angiosperms
- Clade: Magnoliids
- Order: Laurales
- Family: Lauraceae
- Genus: Endiandra
- Species: E. cowleyana

Binomial name
- Endiandra cowleyana F.M.Bailey

Species of flowering plant

Endiandra cowleyana, commonly known as northern rose walnut, is a species of plant in the family Lauraceae native to Queensland, Australia. It is a rainforest tree, first described in 1892. It has a conservation status of least concern.

== Description ==
Endiandra cowleyana is a tree that may grow to about 30 m (98 ft) in height and 80 cm (31 in) diameter. The trunk is often buttressed and the bark is nondescript. The leaves are generally about 7 cm (2.8 in) long and 3 cm (1.2 in) wide and have 3–8 pairs of lateral veins. The upperside is green, the underside is sometimes glaucous; there are conspicuous foveoles in the junctions of the lateral veins with the mid vein.

The inflorescence is a panicle emerging from the leaf axils. Flowers are yellow to creamy green and they may be faintly scented; they have six tepals up to 1 mm (0.04 in) long. The fruit is an ellipsoid drupe, yellow green to orange, about 3 cm (1.2 in) long and 2 cm (0.79 in) wide. It contains a single brown seed about 25 mm (1.0 in) long and 14 mm (0.6 in) wide.

== Distribution ==
It occurs mainly within coastal and sub-coastal areas of Queensland from about Cooktown to Townsville. There are also outlying populations to the north near Coen and to the south near Proserpine and Mackay. It grows in mature rainforest at altitudes up to 1,000 m (3,300 ft).

== Ecology ==
The tree produces a general purpose timber which is sold under the name "northern rose walnut". It has a density of 770 kg/m^{3} (1,300 lb/cu yd).

== Conservation ==
This species was assessed by the International Union for Conservation of Nature (IUCN) in 2019 and found to be of least-concern. It is also rated as least-concern by the Queensland Government under its Nature Conservation Act. In its statement, the IUCN cites the lack of any perceived threat to the species, as well as a wide distribution and large population, as the basis for the assessment.
