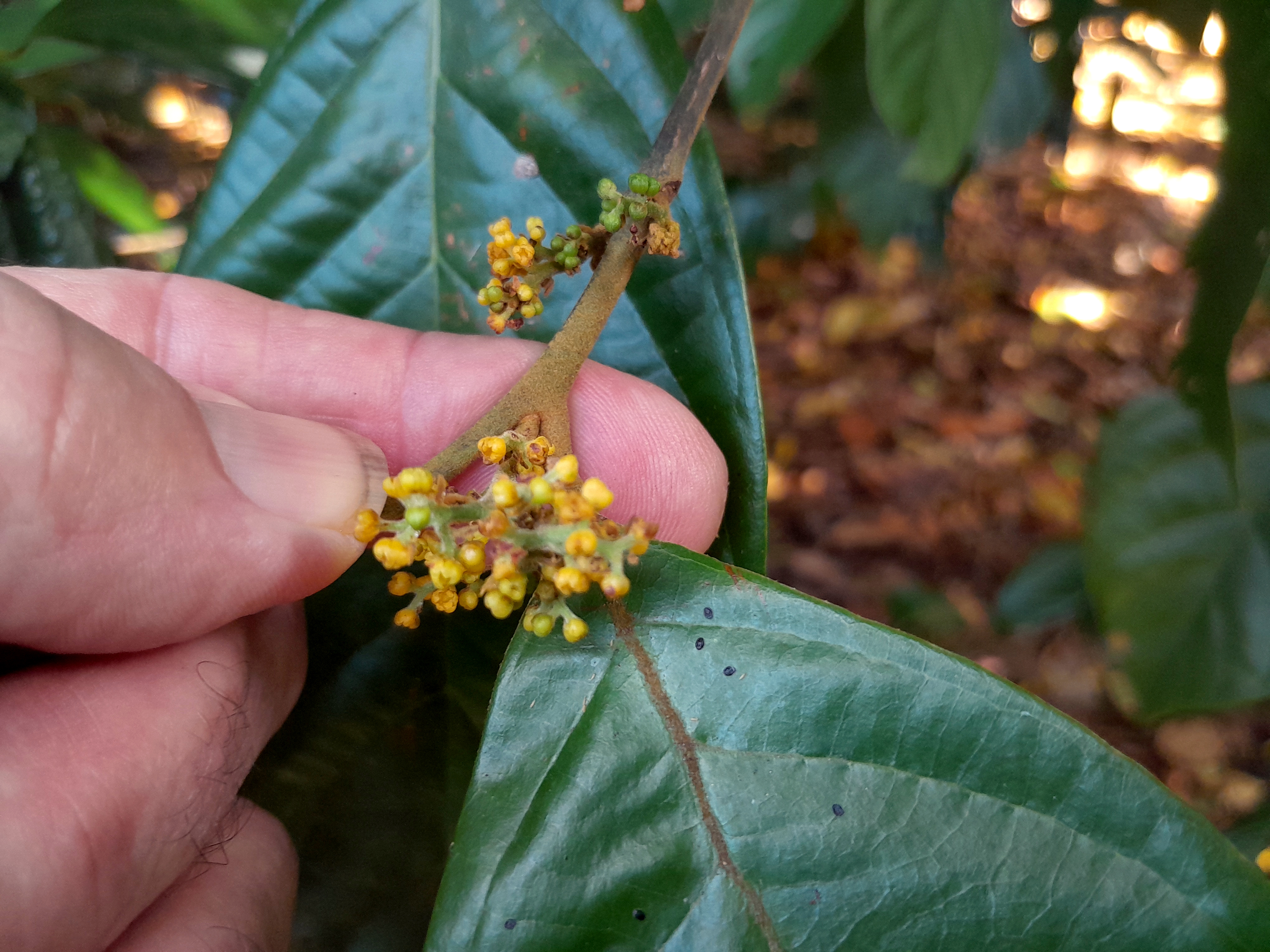
- Inflorescence

Conservation status
- Least Concern (NCA)
- Least Concern (IUCN 3.1)

Scientific classification
- Kingdom: Plantae
- Clade: Tracheophytes
- Clade: Angiosperms
- Clade: Magnoliids
- Order: Laurales
- Family: Lauraceae
- Genus: Endiandra
- Species: E. sankeyana

Binomial name
- Endiandra sankeyana F.M.Bailey
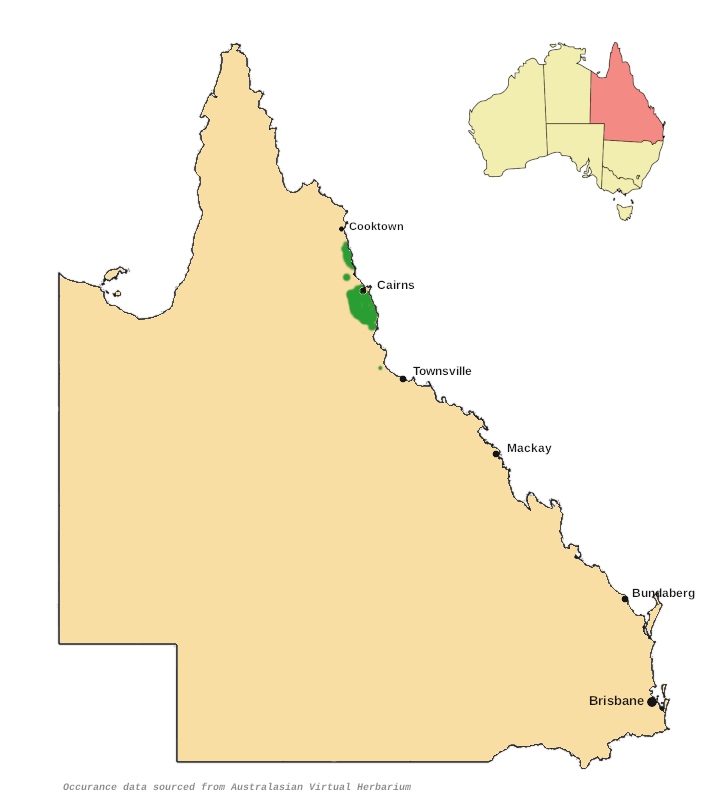

= Endiandra sankeyana =

Sankey's Walnut

Species of flowering plant

Endiandra sankeyana, commonly known as Sankey's walnut, is a plant in the laurel family Lauraceae that was first described in the late 19th century. It is endemic to the northeastern coastal rainforests of Queensland, Australia.

== Description ==
Sankey's walnut is an evergreen canopy tree growing up to 30 m (98 ft) high, and it may be buttressed. The leaf bearing twigs are angular or fluted and are finely hairy. The leaves are dark green above and somewhat glaucous (chalky blue-green) below, with a petiole up to 18 mm (0.7 in) long. They are lanceolate to elliptic to more or less obovate, and measure up to 17 by 9.5 cm (6.7 by 3.7 in).

The much branched inflorescences are produced in the leaf axils and carry dozens of very small, fragrant, golden-yellow flowers about 2–3 mm (0.08–0.12 in) wide. The fruit is a globose or ellipsoid blue drupe, measuring up to 54 by 41 mm (2.1 by 1.6 in) and containing a single seed.

== Taxonomy ==
This species was first described in 1893 by the Australian botanist Frederick Manson Bailey, and published in Botany Bulletin, a journal published by the then Queensland Department of Agriculture. Bailey's description was based on material collected by E. Cowley in "scrubs of the Barron River".

=== Etymology ===
The genus name Endiandra is formed from "endo" meaning inner or inside, and "andro" meaning male, which is a reference to the inner series of anthers being fertile. The species epithet sankeyana was chosen to honour J. R. Sankey.

== Distribution and habitat ==
Endiandra sankeyana is found from the Cooktown region in the north to the area near Mission Beach in the south, with a single occurrence recorded another 90 km (56 mi) further south near Ingham. It grows in mature rainforest on a variety of soils, at altitudes from sea level to around 1,300 m (4,300 ft).

== Ecology ==
Fruits of this species are eaten by musky rat-kangaroos and cassowaries, both of which are recognised as important seed distributors for numerous species of plants. They are also eaten by native rodents.

== Conservation ==
This species has been assessed by the Queensland Government's Department of the Environment, Tourism, Science and Innovation, and by the International Union for Conservation of Nature (IUCN), as having a conservation status of least concern.

== Gallery ==
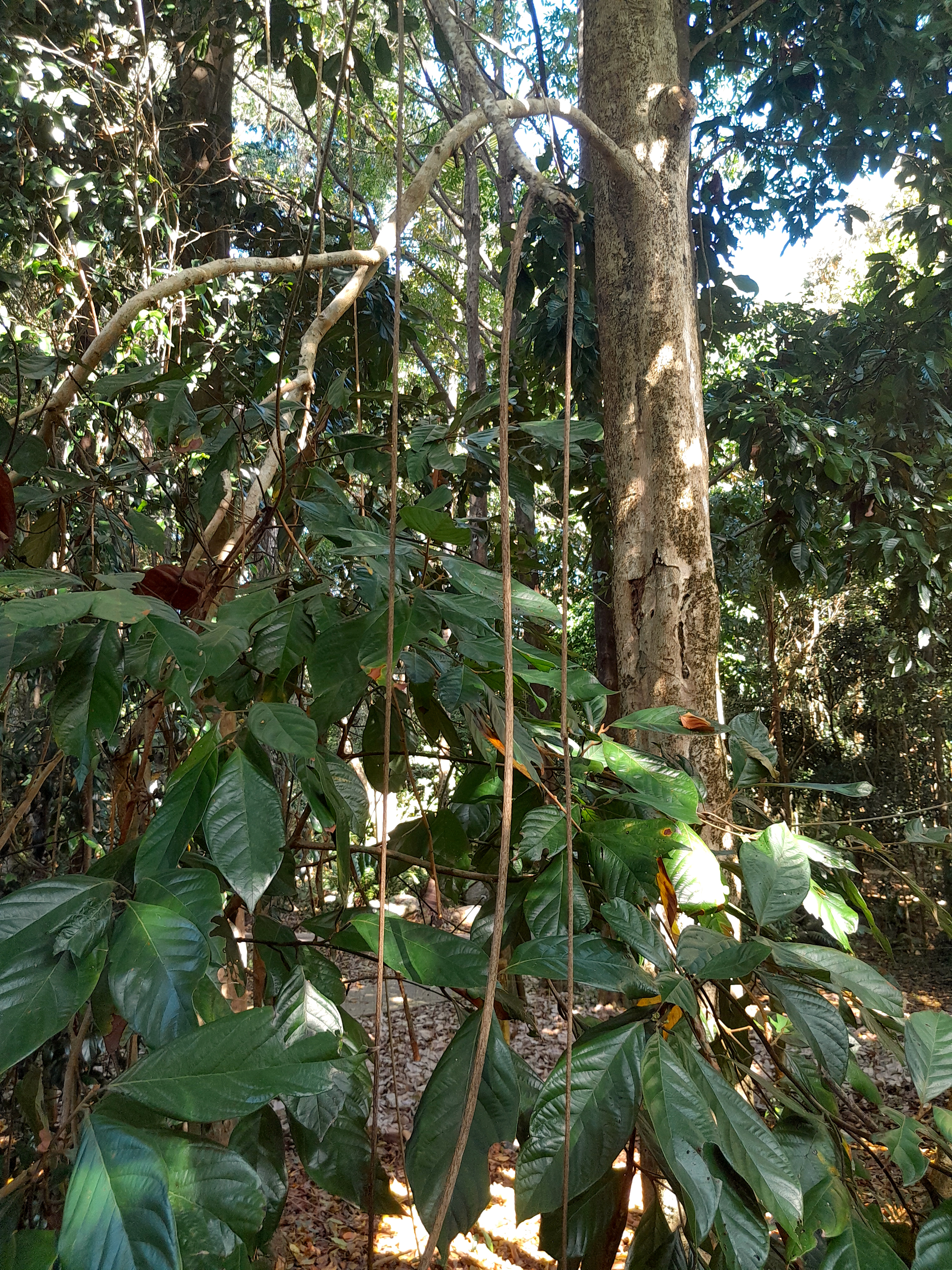
Foliage and trunk

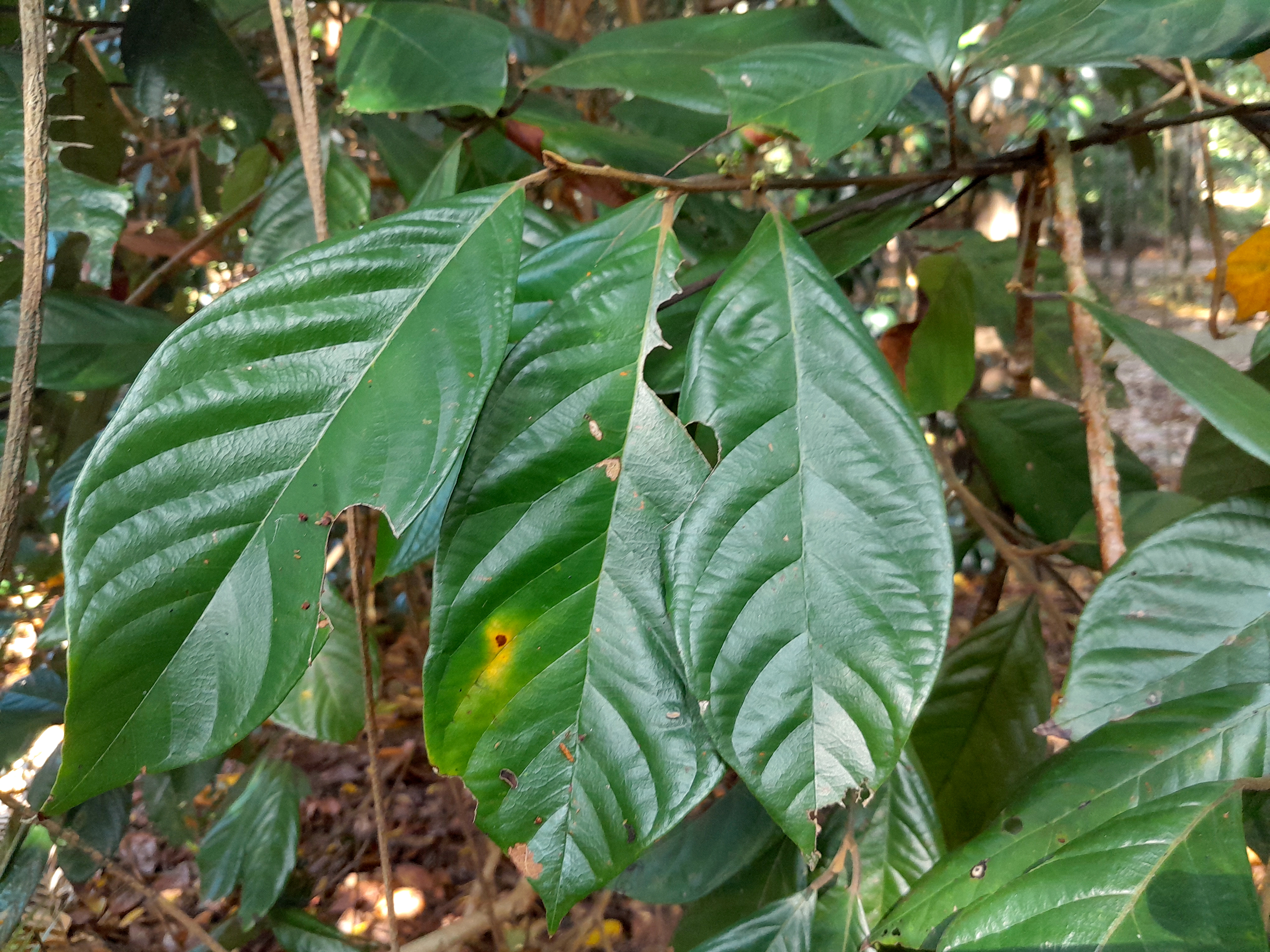
Foliage

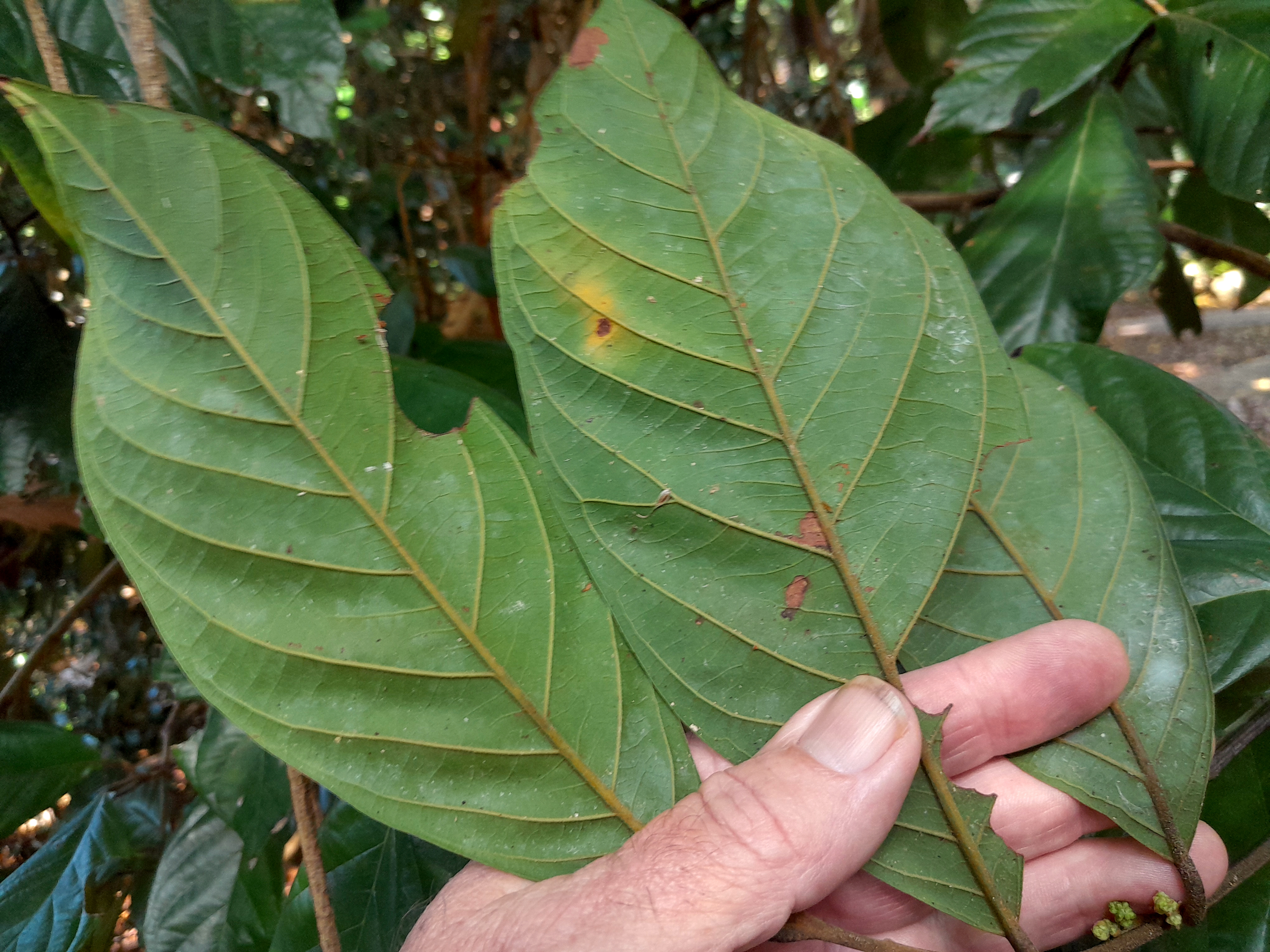
Underside of leaves

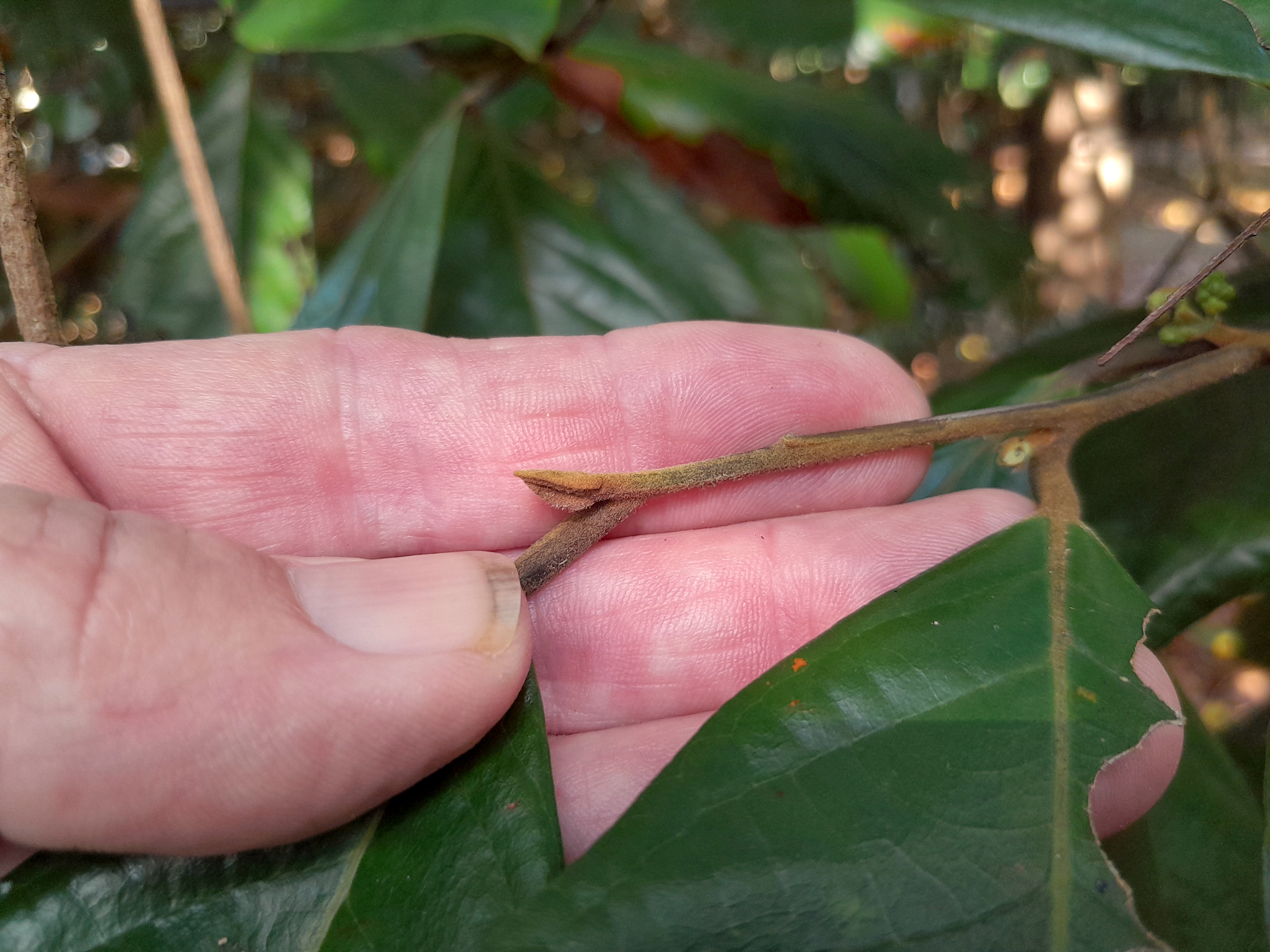
Growing tip
