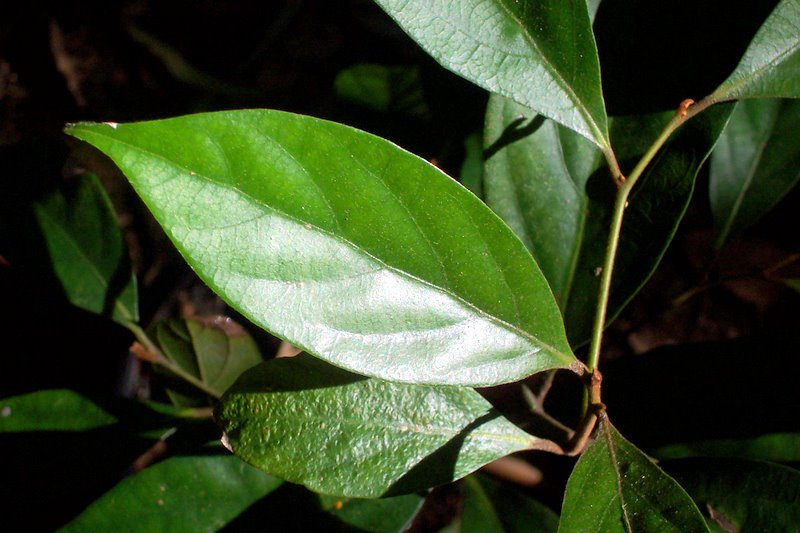
- Endiandra pubens, leaf

Scientific classification
- Kingdom: Plantae
- Clade: Tracheophytes
- Clade: Angiosperms
- Clade: Magnoliids
- Order: Laurales
- Family: Lauraceae
- Genus: Endiandra; R.Br.

Type species
- Endiandra glauca R.Br.

Species
- Over 100

Synonyms
- Brassiodendron C.K.Allen; Dictyodaphne Blume

= Endiandra =

Genus of flowering plants

Endiandra is a genus of about 130 species of plants, mainly trees, in the laurel family Lauraceae. They are commonly called "walnut" despite not being related to the Northern Hemisphere walnuts (Juglans spp.) which are in the family Juglandaceae.

Endiandra hypotephra flowers

Endiandra impressicosta fruit

Endiandra cowleyana inflorescence

Endiandra bellendenkerana flowers

Endiandra acuminata foliage and flowers

== Description ==
The genus consists of evergreen shrubs or trees. Leaves are alternate or spirally arranged, usually penninerved or rarely triplinerved. Inflorescences are usually paniculate and axillary. Flowers are bisexual and mostly trimerous with two whorls of three tepals, some are dimerous. There are usually three stamens, and the ovary is usually sessile or nearly so. It has a single carpel and a single ovule. The fruits are single-seeded drupes or berries with fleshy mesocarp and exocarp.

== Distribution ==
Species of Endiandra are native to the following regions as defined in the World Geographical Scheme for Recording Plant Distributions:

- China – China South-Central, China Southeast, Hainan
- Eastern Asia – Taiwan
- Indian Subcontinent – Assam, Bangladesh, East Himalaya
- Indo-China – Myanmar, Vietnam
- Malesia – Borneo, Jawa, Lesser Sunda Is., Malaya, Maluku, Philippines, Sulawesi, Sumatera
- Papuasia – New Guinea, Solomon Is.
- Australia – New South Wales, Northern Territory, Queensland
- Southwestern Pacific – Fiji, New Caledonia, Samoa, Santa Cruz Is., Tonga, Vanuatu

== Species ==
There were 134 species accepted by Plants of the World Online as of September 2026. These are:

- Endiandra acuminata C.T.White
- Endiandra aggregata Kosterm.
- Endiandra albiramea Kosterm.
- Endiandra aneityensis Guillaumin
- Endiandra anthropophagorum Domin
- Endiandra archboldiana C.K.Allen
- Endiandra areolata Arifiani
- Endiandra arfakensis Kosterm.
- Endiandra artensis Munzinger & McPherson
- Endiandra asymmerrica Teschner
- Endiandra baillonii (Pancher & Sebert) Guillaumin
- Endiandra beccariana Kosterm.
- Endiandra bellendenkerana B.Hyland
- Endiandra bessaphila B.Hyland
- Endiandra brassii C.K.Allen
- Endiandra bullata (C.K.Allen) Kosterm.
- Endiandra carrii Kosterm.
- Endiandra chartacea Kosterm.
- Endiandra clavigera Kosterm.
- Endiandra clemensii C.K.Allen
- Endiandra collinsii B.Hyland
- Endiandra compressa C.T.White
- Endiandra cooperana B.Hyland
- Endiandra coriacea Merr.
- Endiandra cowleyana F.M.Bailey
- Endiandra crassiflora C.T.White & W.D.Francis
- Endiandra cuneata Miq.
- Endiandra cyphellophora Kosterm.
- Endiandra dichrophylla F.Muell.
- Endiandra dielsiana Teschner
- Endiandra discolor Benth.
- Endiandra djamuensis Kosterm.
- Endiandra dolichocarpa S.K.Lee & Y.T.Wei
- Endiandra elaeocarpa Gillespie
- Endiandra elongata Arifiani
- Endiandra engleriana Teschner
- Endiandra euadenia Kosterm.
- Endiandra eusideroxylocarpa Kosterm.
- Endiandra faceta Kosterm.
- Endiandra ferruginea Teschner
- Endiandra firma Nees
- Endiandra flavinervis Teschner
- Endiandra floydii B.Hyland
- Endiandra forbesii Gamble
- Endiandra formicaria Kosterm.
- Endiandra fulva Teschner
- Endiandra gem Kosterm.
- Endiandra gemopsis Kosterm.
- Endiandra gillespiei A.C.Sm.
- Endiandra glauca R.Br.
- Endiandra globosa Maiden & Betche
- Endiandra grandifolia Teschner
- Endiandra grayi B.Hyland
- Endiandra hainanensis Merr. & F.P.Metcalf
- Endiandra havelii Kosterm.
- Endiandra hayesii Kosterm.
- Endiandra holttumii M.R.Hend.
- Endiandra humboldtiana Munzinger & McPherson
- Endiandra hypotephra F.Muell.
- Endiandra immersa Arifiani
- Endiandra impressicosta C.K.Allen
- Endiandra inopinata B.Gray
- Endiandra insignis (F.M.Bailey) F.M.Bailey
- Endiandra introrsa C.T.White
- Endiandra invasiorum Kosterm.
- Endiandra javanica Kamik.
- Endiandra jonesii B.Hyland
- Endiandra kassamensis Arifiani
- Endiandra kingiana Gamble
- Endiandra lanata Arifiani
- Endiandra latifolia Kosterm.
- Endiandra laxiflora Merr.
- Endiandra lecardii Guillaumin
- Endiandra ledermannii Teschner
- Endiandra leptodendron B.Hyland
- Endiandra limnophila B.Hyland
- Endiandra longipedicellata C.T.White
- Endiandra luteola A.C.Sm.
- Endiandra macrocarpa D.Y.Zou, Lang Li & J.Li
- Endiandra macrophylla (Blume) Boerl.
- Endiandra macrostemon Kosterm.
- Endiandra magnilimba Kosterm.
- Endiandra maingayi Hook.f.
- Endiandra merrillii Kamik.
- Endiandra microneura C.T.White
- Endiandra microphylla Teschner
- Endiandra minutiflora Kosterm.
- Endiandra monothyra B.Hyland
- Endiandra montana C.T.White
- Endiandra monticola A.C.Sm.
- Endiandra mulleri Meisn.
- Endiandra multiflora Teschner
- Endiandra neocaledonica Kosterm.
- Endiandra oblonga Teschner
- Endiandra ochracea Kosterm.
- Endiandra oviformis Kosterm.
- Endiandra palmerstonii (F.M.Bailey) C.T.White
- Endiandra papuana Lauterb.
- Endiandra phaeocarpa B.Hyland
- Endiandra pilosa Kosterm.
- Endiandra polyneura Schltr.
- Endiandra poueboensis Guillaumin
- Endiandra praeclara Gamble
- Endiandra pubens Meisn.
- Endiandra recurva C.T.White
- Endiandra reticulata Gillespie
- Endiandra rhizophoretum Kosterm. ex Arifiani
- Endiandra rigidior Kosterm.
- Endiandra rubescens (Blume) Miq.
- Endiandra sankeyana F.M.Bailey
- Endiandra schlechteri Teschner
- Endiandra scrobiculata Kosterm. ex Kochummen
- Endiandra sebertii Guillaumin
- Endiandra sericea Kosterm.
- Endiandra sideroxylon B.Hyland
- Endiandra sieberi Nees
- Endiandra sleumeri Kosterm.
- Endiandra solomonensis C.K.Allen
- Endiandra spathulata Kosterm.
- Endiandra sphaerica C.K.Allen
- Endiandra sulavesiana Kosterm.
- Endiandra teschneri Kamik.
- Endiandra teschneriana C.K.Allen
- Endiandra trichogyna Munzinger & McPherson
- Endiandra trichotosa A.C.Sm.
- Endiandra tryphera A.C.Sm.
- Endiandra versteeghii Kosterm.
- Endiandra virens F.Muell.
- Endiandra whitmorei Kosterm.
- Endiandra wolfei B.Hyland
- Endiandra wongawallanensis L.Weber
- Endiandra wrayi Gamble
- Endiandra xanthocarpa B.Hyland
- Endiandra xylophylla Kosterm.
