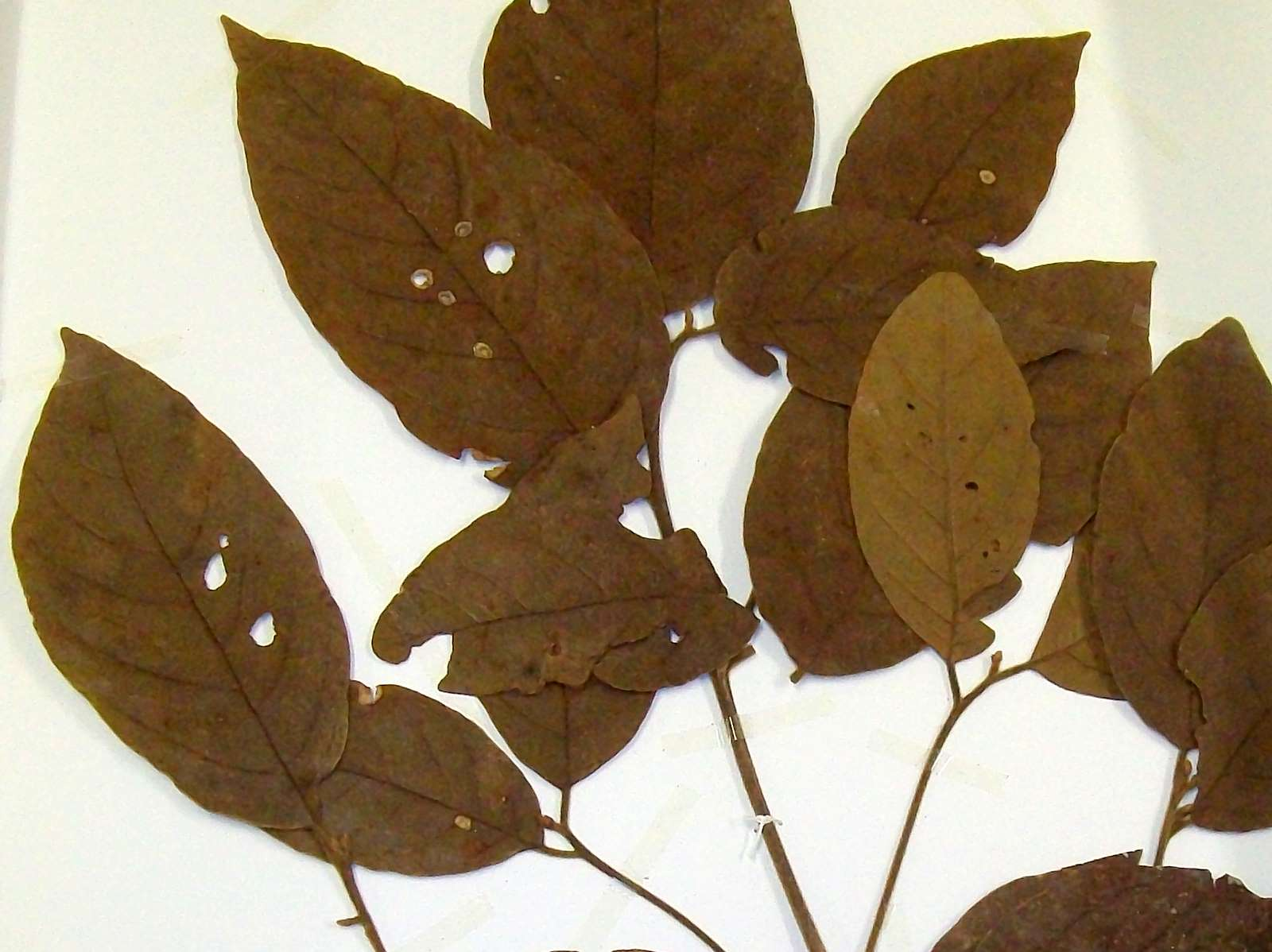

Conservation status
- Vulnerable (EPBC Act)

Scientific classification
- Kingdom: Plantae
- Clade: Tracheophytes
- Clade: Angiosperms
- Clade: Magnoliids
- Order: Laurales
- Family: Lauraceae
- Genus: Endiandra
- Species: E. hayesii

Binomial name
- Endiandra hayesii Kosterm.

= Endiandra hayesii =

Species of tree

Endiandra hayesii is an Australian rainforest tree. Despite the common name of rusty rose walnut, this tree is unrelated to northern hemisphere walnuts, and is a laurel. The former habitat is lowland sub tropical rainforest, most of which has been cleared. However some trees persist in cool sheltered gullies as far south as the Richmond River, New South Wales to just over the border at Burleigh Heads in Queensland. The rusty rose walnut is considered rare, with a ROTAP rating of 3RC-. It is named after H.C. Hayes, who collected this species at Minyon Falls.

== Description ==
Usually a small crooked tree, however at Minyon Falls is a 35-metre-tall (115 ft) tree with a trunk diameter of 60 cm. The trunk is usually straight on smaller trees, but buttressed in larger trees. The bark is fairly smooth with some scales, grey or grey brown in colour. Small branches with rusty brown hairs. With furry yellow leaf buds.

Leaves 6 to 12 cm long, and 3 to 6 cm wide. Hairy and dull, particularly on the underside, with reddish brown leaf hairs. Leaf stem hairy, 5 to 10 mm long. Leaves veiny on the underside.

=== Flowers and fruit ===
Greenish white flowers form on panicles from October to November. Panicles form from leaf axils or at the end of branchlets. Petals up to 2 mm long. The fruit is a purplish black drupe, maturing from March to August. Tear drop shaped up to 3 cm long. The cream seed should be planted after the removal of the thin layer of green flesh.

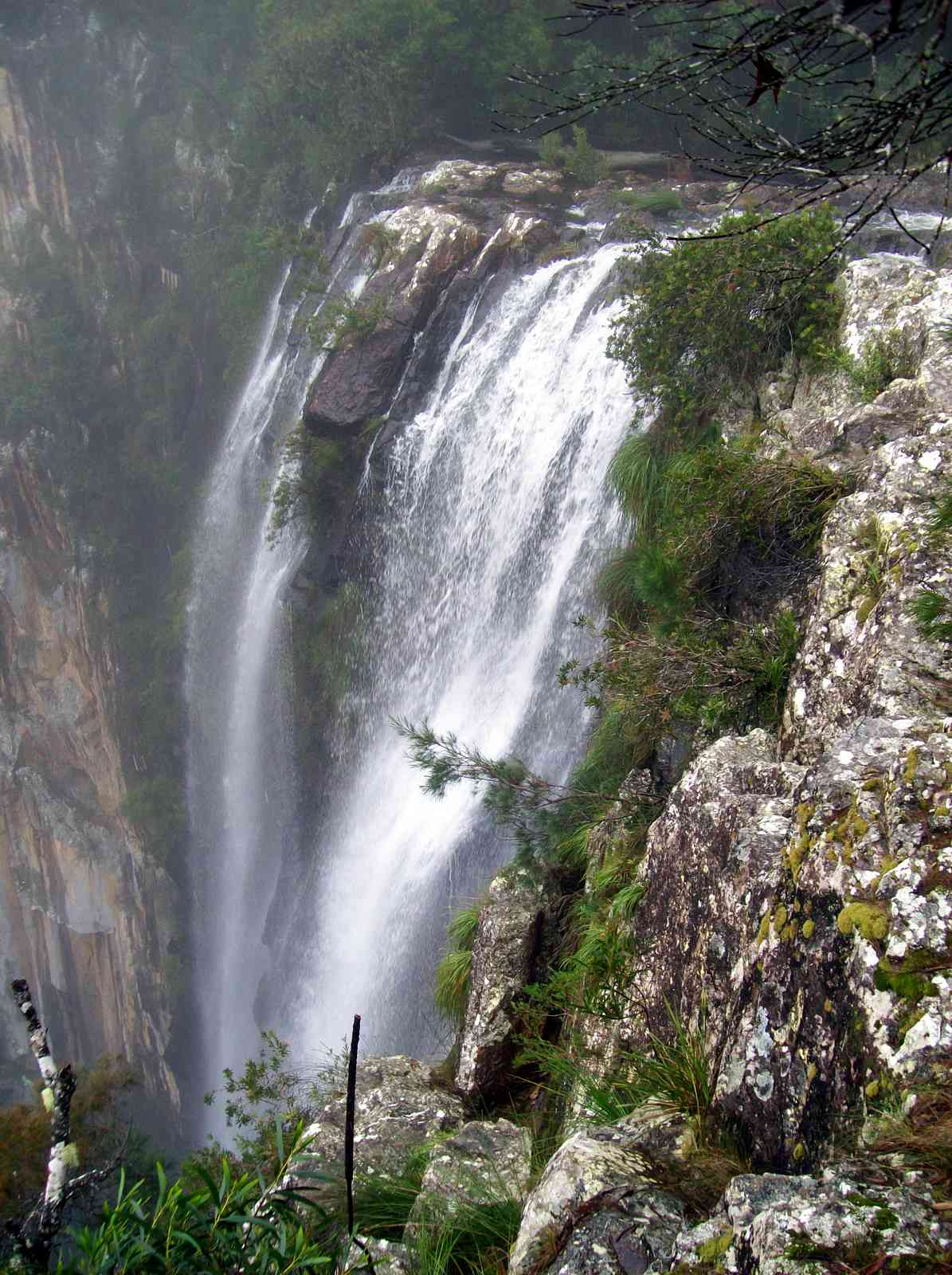
Minyon Falls, in north eastern New South Wales, is the type locality of the Rusty Rose Walnut
