= Endiandra havelii =

Conservation status
- Critically Endangered (IUCN 3.1)

Scientific classification
- Kingdom: Plantae
- Clade: Tracheophytes
- Clade: Angiosperms
- Clade: Magnoliids
- Order: Laurales
- Family: Lauraceae
- Genus: Endiandra
- Species: E. havelii

Binomial name
- Endiandra havelii Kosterm.

Species of tree

Endiandra havelii is a species of rainforest tree in the laurel family. It is endemic to New Guinea. In 2020 it was classified as being critically endangered.
