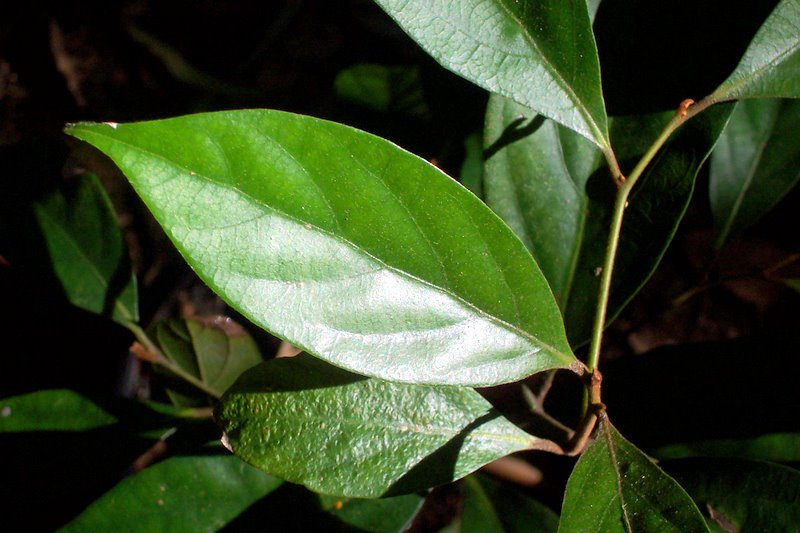
- Endiandra pubens, leaf

Conservation status
- Least Concern (IUCN 3.1)

Scientific classification
- Kingdom: Plantae
- Clade: Tracheophytes
- Clade: Angiosperms
- Clade: Magnoliids
- Order: Laurales
- Family: Lauraceae
- Genus: Endiandra
- Species: E. pubens

Binomial name
- Endiandra pubens Meisn., D.C.Prodr., 1864

= Endiandra pubens =

Rusty walnut

Species of tree

Endiandra pubens is a rainforest tree growing in eastern Australia. The habitat is subtropical rainforest growing near streams in valleys. The range of natural distribution is from the Bellinger River, New South Wales to Bulburin National Park, south west of Gladstone, Queensland.

Common names include rusty walnut, hairy walnut, possum apple, red apple and whitebark walnut. Despite the common names, this tree belongs to the laurel family.

== Description ==
A small bushy tree, occasionally reaching 25 metres tall and a trunk diameter of 45 cm. The base of the tree may be flanged or somewhat buttressed in larger trees. The bark is pale, light grey or fawn in colour. Small branches are rusty and hairy.

Leaves simple and alternate, ovate in shape, 7 to 20 cm long. Glossy green above, rusty and hairy underneath. Leaf stalks hairy being 5 to 20 mm long. Leaf veins visible on both upper and lower sides. However, more noticeable below with a covering of brown hairs.

Cream or orange flowers form on short panicles in the months of March to May. Rusty in appearance and with an aniseed scent.

Fruit matures from October to February being a large fleshy drupe, 3 to 6 cm in diameter. Greenish or a deep red in colour. Inside is a single large seed.

Removal of the red fleshy aril is advised to assist germination. Regeneration from fresh seed is very slow, often taking a year for roots and shoots to appear.
