= Domatium =

Plant structure

A domatium (plural: domatia, from the Latin "domus", meaning home) is a tiny chamber produced by a plant that may be occupied by arthropods.

Ideally domatia differ from galls in that they are produced by the plant rather than being induced by their inhabitants, but the distinction is not sharp; the development of many types of domatia is influenced and promoted by the inhabitants. Most domatia are inhabited either by mites or ants, in what can be a mutualist relationship, but other arthropods such as thrips may take parasitic advantage of the protection offered by this structure.

Domatia occupied by ants are called myrmecodomatia. An important class of myrmecodomatia comprise large, hollow spines of certain acacias such as Acacia sphaerocephala, in which ants of the genera Pseudomyrmex and Tetraponera make their nests. Plants that provide myrmecodomatia are called myrmecophytes. The variety of the plants that provide myrmecodomatia, and the ranges of forms of such domatia are considerable. Some plants, such as Myrmecodia, grow large bulbous structures riddled with channels in which their ants may establish themselves, both for mutual protection and for the nutritive benefit of the ants' wastes.

Often domatia are formed on the lower surface of leaves, at the juncture of the midrib and the veins. They usually consist of small depressions partly enclosed by leaf tissue or hairs. Many members of the family Lauraceae develop leaf domatia. Domatia are also found in some rainforest tree species in the families Alangiaceae, Elaeocarpaceae, Fabaceae, Icacinaceae, Meliaceae, Rubiaceae, Sapindaceae and Simaroubaceae.

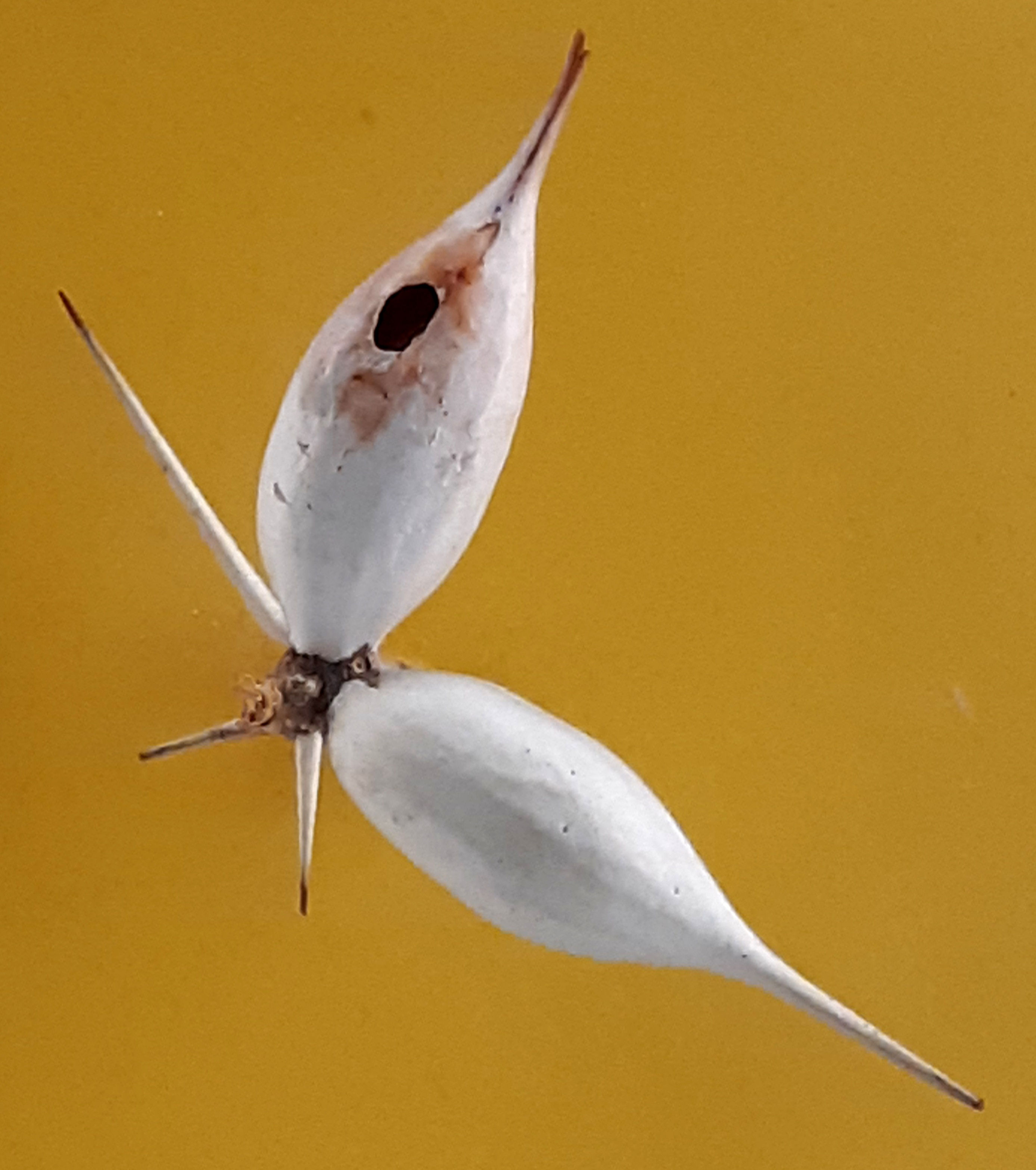
Domatia for symbiotic ants in swollen hollow spines of Vachellia seyal acacia

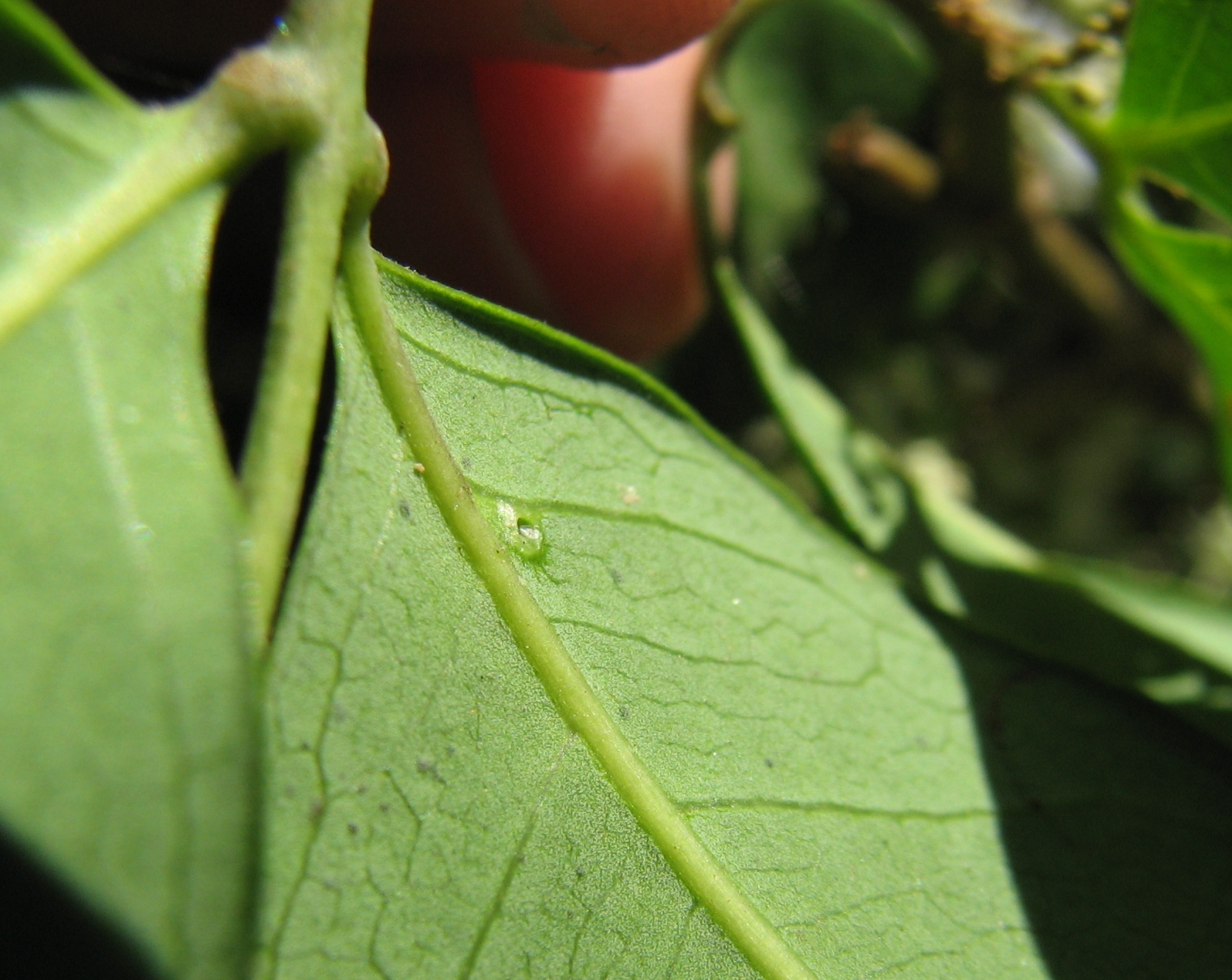
A hairless foveole domatium in the leaf underside of Guioa acutifolia

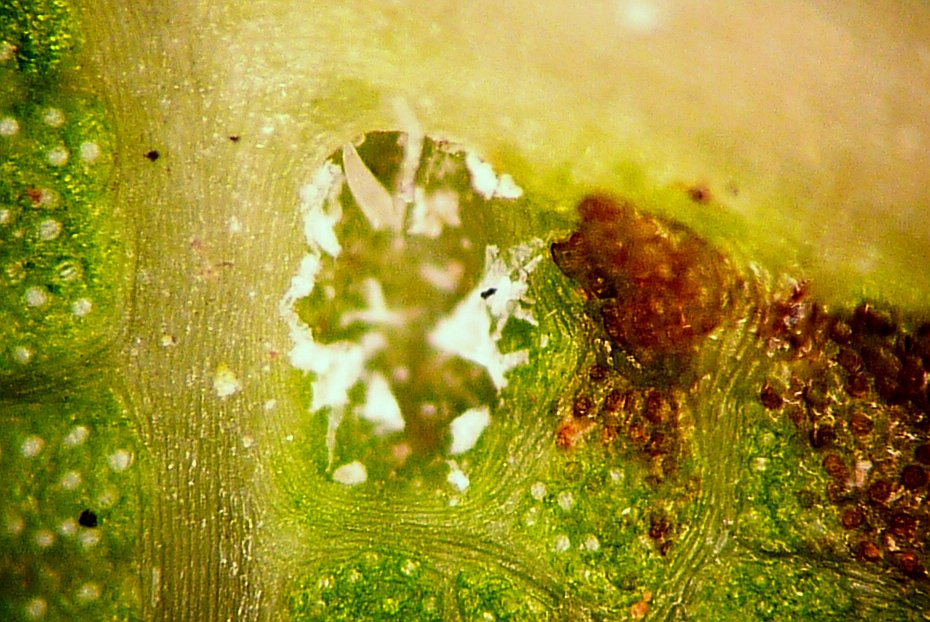
Eriophyoid inside domatium of Cinnamomum camphora

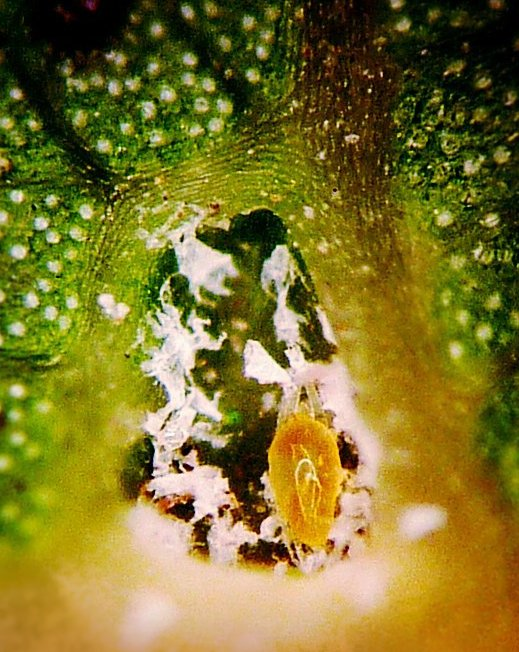
Mite inside domatium of Cinnamomum camphora

== See also ==
- Acarodomatia
