= Bernard Hyland =

Australian botanist

Bernard (Bernie) Patrick Matthew Hyland
- Born: 1937 (age 88–89)
- Citizenship: Australian
- Known for: rainforest botany
- Scientific career
- Fields: botany
- Author abbrev. (botany): B.Hyland

Bernard Hyland (Bernard Patrick Matthew Hyland, born 1937), known as Bernie Hyland, is an Australian botanist.

He has contributed significantly to the understanding of Australian plants, in particular numerous species of his home and workplace in the Wet Tropics of Queensland. His contributions include many activities; he has collected eighteen thousand specimens and has named and scientifically described hundreds of species. He has expertise in the Australian rainforests’ rich diversity of species of the plant families Lauraceae and Myrtaceae. For example, his Lauraceae 1989 major revision of seven genera of one hundred and fifteen species, and his rainforest Myrtaceae 1983 major revision of seventy species of the genus Syzygium and allied genera.

A major project he worked on for approximately 45 years is the Australian Tropical Rainforest Plants identification key and information system (RFK).

He retired in 2002, continuing as a CSIRO Honorary Research Fellow and contributing to the continuing development of RFK.

== Australian Tropical Rainforest Plants information system ==
The most recent release is the 2020 8th edition, titled Australian Tropical Rainforest Plants Edition 8. This edition achieved the goal of making it freely available via the internet or via paid-for mobile apps for Android and iPhone. Both versions include fact sheets providing comprehensive descriptions for 2762 species, uses over 730 diagnostic features to make identifications, and contains around 14,000 images.

== Legacy ==
The genus Hylandia, described in 1974 by Herbert K. Airy Shaw, and the following species have names in his honour:

- Alpinia hylandii
- Antidesma hylandii
- Ardisia hylandii
- Ceratopetalum hylandii
- Cleistanthus hylandii
- Corymbia hylandii
- Diploglottis bernieana
- Euodia hylandii
- Glochidion hylandii
- Memecylon hylandii
- Premna hylandiana
- Pseuduvaria hylandii
- Rhodamnia hylandii
- Symplocos hylandii
- Wilkiea hylandii

== See also ==
- Taxa named by Bernard Hyland
