= Curtain Fig National Park =

National park in Australia

- IUCN category II (national park)
- Location within Queensland
- Location: Queensland
- Nearest city: Yungaburra
- Coordinates: 17°16′57″S 145°34′22″E
- Area: 1.95 km^{2} (0.75 sq mi)
- Established: 28 November 2008
- Visitors: 100 000 per year
- Governing body: Queensland Parks and Wildlife Service
- Website: https://parks.des.qld.gov.au/parks/curtain-fig/

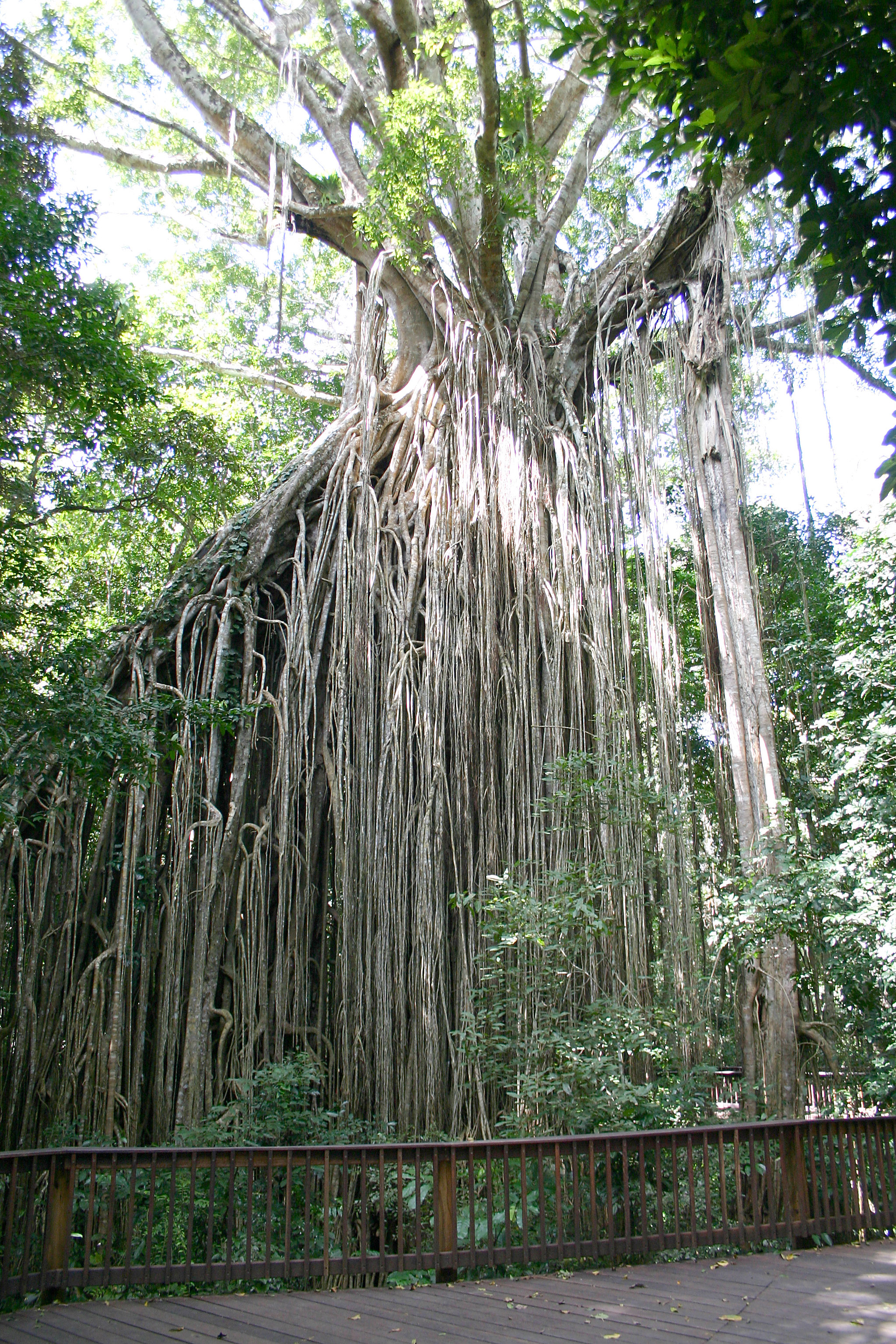
Curtain Fig Tree, Yungaburra, Queensland, Australia.

The Curtain Fig National Park is a national park on the Atherton Tableland in Far North Queensland, Australia. The National Park is located near Yungaburra. Its most valued features are its once regionally common, now endangered Mabi forests including a huge strangler fig which attracts up to 100 000 visitors per year, locally known as the Curtain Fig Tree, plus a near threatened, locally endemic tree-kangaroo species i.e. the Lumholtz's tree-kangaroo which finds refuge inside this protected area

Park is located at 720 metres above sea level.

== Geology ==
Curtain Fig National Park lies within an area where, more than 350 000 years ago, volcanic activity erupted basalt from seven vents, forming the seven cinder cones locally known as the Seven Sisters now surrounding the National Park. The eruptions of basalt from the Seven Sisters were responsible for the large basalt boulders littering the National Park's floor, also the National Park's and surrounding area's rich, fertile soils.

== Flora ==
This Curtain Fig National Park's fertile basalt soil now grows locally endemic, endangered upland semi-evergreen notophyll vine forest known as Mabi forest interspersed with two other endangered regional ecosystems, namely some open woodland with associated sedge, plus some open forest with associated grasslands.

The National Park protects a fragmented endangered remnant of the Atherton Tablelands' once prominent Mabi forests, including within, threatened Lacewood (Firmiana papuana) and pink leaf haplostichanthus (Haplostichanthus), plus vulnerable waratah (Alloxylon flammeum) and red-fruited sauropus (Sauropus macranthus) trees.

The Curtain Fig Tree after which the National Park has been named, is a green strangling fig (Ficus virens) which is deciduous and drops its leaves mid year (the cooler months), also hosting a large range of birds, bats, insects, possums, and other mammals which feed and feast off the fig's red fruit and fleshy leaves

== Fauna ==
Among the animals in the park, various species of insects, mammals and reptiles can be found. For example, there are Leaf-tailed geckos, Lumholtz's tree-kangaroo and many possums.

== See also ==
- Curtain Fig Tree
- Protected areas of Queensland
