= White laurel =

White laurel can refer to:

- Cryptocarya densiflora
- Cryptocarya grandis
- Cryptocarya laevigata
- Magnolia virginiana
- Rhododendron maximum
- Umbellularia californica
