= White Car =

White Car may refer to:

- "White Car", a 1987 song by Cabaret Voltaire from Code
- "White Car", a 2006 song by Viva Death from One Percent Panic
- "White Car", a 1980 song by Yes from Drama
- "White Car", a chapter of Case Closed

== See also ==
- Black Car (disambiguation)
- Car colour popularity
- White Cat (disambiguation)
- White Motor Company, former American automobile manufacturer
- Whitecar Coaches, a defunct Australian bus company
