= Dansiea elliptica =

Scientific classification
- Kingdom: Plantae
- Clade: Tracheophytes
- Clade: Angiosperms
- Clade: Eudicots
- Clade: Rosids
- Order: Myrtales
- Family: Combretaceae
- Genus: Dansiea
- Species: D. elliptica

Binomial name
- Dansiea elliptica Byrnes

Species of flowering plant

Dansiea elliptica is a species of rainforest tree which is endemic to Queensland, Australia. The species, which occurs within two highly disjunct centres of distribution, is primarily found in drier notophyll vine forests and semi evergreen vine thickets in the Wet Tropics of Queensland and Central Queensland. The species is listed as Near Threatened under the Queensland Nature Conservation Act (1992) and has a total area of occupancy of less than 40 square km.

One of only two species in its genus along with Dansiea grandiflora, Dansiea elliptica was first described by N.B. Byrnes in Austrobaileya Vol.1 on page 385 in 1981. The genus name honours Sam Dansie (1927–2012), an Australian forester and plant collector.

== Description ==
Dansiea elliptica grows up to 35 m tall. It features dark, greyish brown bark which is fissured and flaky and a trunk which reaches a diameter of up to 70 cm. The arrangement of the leaves is spiral and subopposite and their shape is elliptical with the apex apiculate and the base shortly attenuate. The blades of the leaves are green and glossy on top and dull and light green on the underside with the young leaves densely appressed and pubescent. The lamina is 3 to 8.5 cm long by 1 to 3.5 cm wide with the margins entire and glands located near the base. The petioles are 0.5 to 1 cm long with appressed hairs. The inflorescence is cream to pale green in colour, axillary and approximately 20 cm long on 1 cm long peduncles. The calyx has minute hairs and bracteoles which are 12 to 15 mm in diameter, orbicular and adnate to the lower tube. The flowers have 5 petals which are broadly elliptic in shape, 8 to 10 mm long with fine hairs. The calyx tube has 10 stamens inserted in 2 series and there are small appendages at the base of the filaments inside the whorl. When mature the fruit have either two or four wings which are formed from two orbicular bracteoles underneath the flowers. When mature the wings are broad with a surface which is brown, dry and papery in texture. The ripe fruit is woody with yellow-green coloration. The flowers of Dansiea are similar to Macropteranthes on initial impression but are distinguished by being borne single in the axils and featuring an ovary which is fused to the floral tube only on one side. Dansiea elliptica has more ovules than any other species in the Combretaceae family.

== Distribution and habitat ==
Dansiea elliptica occurs in lowland dry rainforests and vinethickets (notophyll vineforests, semi evergreen vinethickets) on soils derived from greywacke (in the southern populations) or rhyolite and basalt (northern populations). Species known to be associated with D. elliptica from a sample site in semi-evergreen vine thicket includes Flindersia australis and Casuarina cristata. In the Rundle Ranges, species such as Gossia bidwillii, Drypetes deplanchei, Planchonella cotinifolia, Pleiogynium timoriense and Terminalia porphyrocarpa occur in the same ecosystems as Dansiea elliptica. In notophyll-mesophyll rainforest in north east Queensland, associated species include a canopy of Polyscias elegans, Flindersia spp., Elaeocarpus eumundi, Synima, Cryptocarya mackinnoniana and Cryptocarya vulgaris growing on soils derived from rhyolite.
