= Sam Dansie =

Australian forester and botanist

- Born: Samuel Justin Dansie; 7 March 1927; Atherton, Queensland, Australia
- Died: 10 September 2012
- Monuments: Samuel Dansie Park
- Occupation: Forestry
- Years active: 1952 – 1988
- Employer: Queensland Forestry Department.
- Known for: Forestry; Nature conservation; Botany; Dansiea
- Spouse: Noelene Dansie
- Children: Stephen Dansie, Russell Dansie, Neil Dansie, Alison Dansie

Samuel Justin Dansie (7 March 1927 – 10 September 2012) was an Australian forester and botanist who was an influential early figure associated with the emergence of a conservation ethos in the use and management of the Wet Tropical rainforests of Northern Queensland. During his 36-year tenure within the Queensland Forestry Department, Dansie was instrumental in identifying and securing the protection of a number of key conservation areas, both within and outside of state forests in the region.

In the 1980s Dansie's work was to become embroiled in political controversy at state and federal levels when one of his research papers inadvertently served to provide pivotal scientific support from within Queensland Forestry for the conservation campaign which later brought an end to logging in the Wet Tropics.

== Early life ==
Samuel Justin Dansie was born to English immigrant parents in Atherton, Queensland on 7 March 1927. He attended a small rural primary school from which he graduated at age 14 and proceeded to work and board at a large dairy farm on the Atherton Tableland.

Dansie joined the Royal Australian Air Force in 1945, towards the end of WWII serving in New Guinea for some time as a part of the 'cleaning up process' and later working in signal interception.

At the conclusion of his time with the RAAF Dansie worked as a contractor felling rainforest in the Millaa Millaa region. After a failed attempt at re-establishing a run down dairy property which he had acquired Dansie sold the property and joined the Queensland Forestry Department along with his brother, Lionel.

== Forestry career ==
Dansie's early career in forestry was based around Danbulla on the Atherton Tableland where he worked both harvesting and marketing forest species. With no formal education in species identification and wood properties Dansie built his botanical knowledge through dialogue with local timber contractors, forestry overseers and botanists from the Queensland Herbarium to whom he would send specimens for the purpose of identification and gaining further botanical information.

Whilst undertaking frequent expeditions into some of the most remote and least accessible areas of virgin forest in the region Dansie would regularly collect new plant specimens which he would submit for study and identification. He was to later gain recognition amongst scientific peers as one of a small group of early specialists in the geography and botany of Australia's wet tropical rainforests. His specimen collection work led to the genus Dansiea, which comprises the species Dansiea elliptica and Dansiea grandiflora, being named in his honour when it was first published in Austrobaileya Vol.1 in 1981. In 1961 Dansie procured the first scientific samples of the plant Musgravea heterophylla west south west of Kuranda. The plant was later formally described as a new species to science by Lindsay Stuart Smith in 1969.

During his tenure with Queensland Forestry Dansie had become concerned about the extent and frequency of logging within many of the region's rainforests and feared their capacity to effectively regenerate was becoming permanently impaired. His early conservation awareness became a motivating influence upon his work to secure the preservation of zones within the Queensland Forestry estate which represented landscapes of critical ecological importance or outstanding natural beauty. A number of key conservation areas were established in the region as a result of Dansie's work including a 263ha tract of complex notophyll vine forest at Wongabel State Forest near Atherton. Also known as Mabi forest or type 5b (Tracey), the highly threatened ecosystem is only found on the Atherton Tableland and covers less than four per cent of its original extent.

From the time of his promotion to Forestry Inspector for North Queensland in 1976, Dansie found himself increasingly caught up in the acrimonious debate arising from rapidly escalating public pressure to secure the complete preservation of the remaining areas of tropical rainforest in North Queensland. This led to new logging rules and environmental guidelines being drawn up and enforced by Forestry on the industry's loggers, a process which Dansie played a central role in.

In 1980, Dansie completed a scientific paper for a Forestry Department Marketing Conference in Gympie which controversially cast doubts upon the estimated remaining resource potential of the State Forests in North Queensland. Members of the conservation movement are alleged to have read the paper in the Gympie Forestry library leading to the findings of Dansie's report becoming a pivotal link in the chain of scientific evidence supporting the conservation campaign which later brought an end to logging in the region via its World Heritage listing in 1988.

Initially dismissed as unauthoritative in State Parliament (1981) by then National Party Minister for Lands and Forestry Bill Glasson, the findings of Dansie's paper remained an important political weapon for conservation campaigners throughout the 1980s and were to later figure prominently in the public case for world heritage listing made by federal Labor Environment Minister Graham Richardson. Richardson asserted through national media channels that "one of the most respected foresters in North Queensland, Mr. Sam Dansie had warned his department earlier this decade rainforests the world over were in general a one-cut operation and Australia was no exception to the rule". In the wake of regular 'sit ins' and intensive national media coverage, then Labor Prime Minister Bob Hawke announced that his government would move to nominate the Wet Tropics of North Queensland for World Heritage listing in June 1987 with the region subsequently gaining World Heritage status in December 1988. Dansie was to retire from the Queensland forestry department the same year.
