= Lake Eacham Hotel =

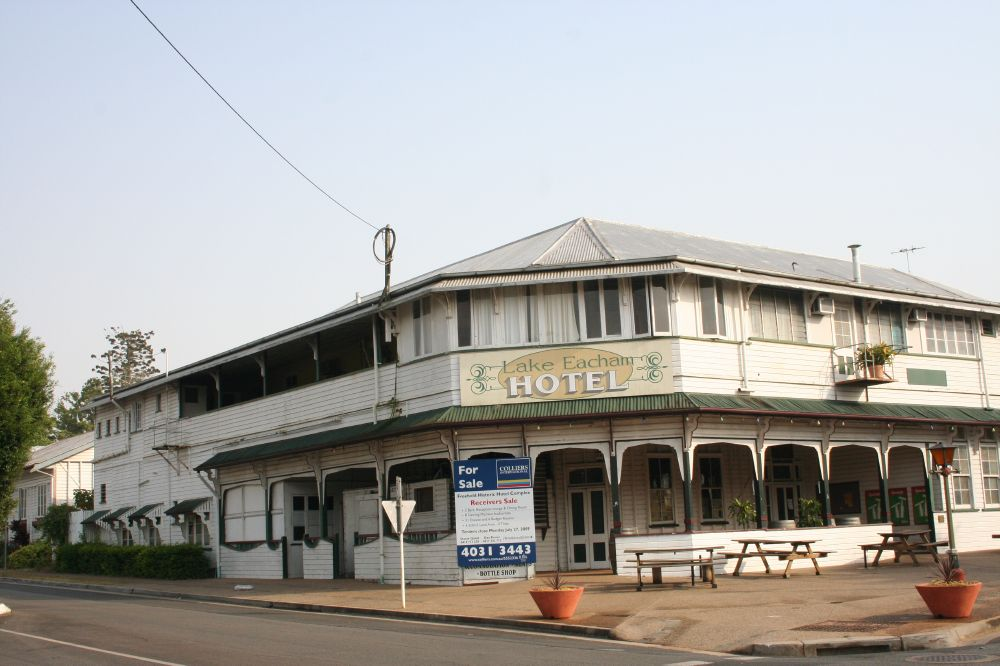
- Lake Eacham Hotel, 2009

- Location within Queensland Location within Australia
- 17.2703°S 145.5826°E
- Location: 6–8 Kehoe Place, Yungaburra, Tablelands Region, Queensland, Australia

History
- Design period: 1900–1914 (early 20th century)
- Built: 1910

Queensland Heritage Register
- Official name: Lake Eacham Hotel
- Type: state heritage (built)
- Designated: 21 October 1992
- Reference no.: 600473
- Significant period: 1910s, 1920s (fabric); 1910–ongoing (historical use)
- Significant components: garden – bed/s, pathway/walkway, furniture/fittings, bushhouse/fernery, post/s – lamp
- Builders: Side Brothers

Lake Eacham Hotel is a heritage-listed hotel at 6–8 Kehoe Place, Yungaburra, Tablelands Region, Queensland, Australia. It was built in 1910 by Side Brothers. It was added to the Queensland Heritage Register on 21 October 1992.

== History ==
Side Brothers constructed the Lake Eacham Hotel for the Williams family in 1910, when the Tablelands railway reached Yungaburra. It was considerably extended and refurbished in 1926 in time for the opening of the first motor road between the coast and Yungaburra, assisting the town to develop as a tourist destination and a gateway to the Atherton Tablelands.

Yungaburra was surveyed in 1888 as a Village Settlement called Allumbah. The Village Settlement scheme was introduced in 1885 and offered settlers farm blocks with home sites clustered as a village. Around this time a railway from the port of Cairns to the Tableland was begun, although it took far longer to reach its objective than originally envisaged. The first farms at Allumbah were taken up in 1891, though the scheme proved unsuccessful. The railway reached Mareeba in 1895 and Atherton in 1903, greatly improving access to the area. Following new Land Acts in the early 1900s more people took up land around Allumbah. The land on which the hotel was later built, and which was to become the commercial heart of Yungaburra, was part of an Agricultural Farm selected by George O'Donnell in 1899. In 1900 the land was sold to George Wedderburn and was subdivided into numerous small blocks in 1910.

The Railway Commissioner acquired six acres and the position of the new Yungaburra railway station caused a geographic shift in focus from the original settlement, which was located towards the northwest. Buildings were constructed or relocated near the railway. Albert and Frederick Williams purchased two of the blocks positioned close to the station in 1911. The Williams family's interest in this area grew as they acquired adjoining land over the next few years.

Henry S. Williams had arrived in Australia in the 1860s and worked in a number of occupations before taking up land at Scrubby Creek on the Tablelands. After losing his dairy cattle to tick in 1895, Williams turned to business and ran a store and butchery at Scrubby Creek and the Carriers Arms hotel at Carrington. He then acquired land in the original Allumbah settlement in 1898 and established a store. He was killed in an accident in 1905, but the business was continued by his family under the name of "Estate H.S. Williams". In 1907, the family set up a shanty, a simple inn offering bar service, food and accommodation, at Allumbah, which was run by 16-year-old Maud Williams. On 15 March 1910, the first train reached the settlement, which had been renamed Yungaburra to avoid confusion with a similarly named town. The railway link triggered a period of rapid development with the construction of a sawmill and a number of shops and houses. The Williams family built a two-storey timber hotel on the land near the railway and the shanty was used as a flourmill. The licence was issued to Frederick Williams, then from 1912 to Albert Williams, although the hotel is said to have been run by their sister Maud. The new hotel was named after Lake Eacham, although this popular picnic spot was 4 miles (6.4 km) away, which suggests that it was intended to appeal to tourists who had come to visit the lake and other natural attractions in the area.

In 1914 Maud Williams married the stationmaster, Jack Kehoe, who worked at the hotel from 1916 and in 1922 was advertised as its proprietor. Maud herself was officially the publican only after her husband's death in 1933, although she is remembered in the district as the driving force behind the hotel's success.

On 26 June 1926, the Gillies Highway between Yungaburra and Gordonvale was opened. The "Range Road" was originally a one-way road controlled by gates at the top and bottom and was the first trafficable road to the Tablelands. It allowed tourists easy access to the crater lakes and other beauty spots. In anticipation of this, the Lake Eacham Hotel was extended significantly along the main road and much of the wide verandah on the upper storey was built in. The new wing included a large lounge and reception area, a lounge bar and extra bedrooms. Yungaburra became a gateway to the natural attractions of the area and a developing tourist trade to the nearby lakes created a second period of development. E.S. (Ned) Williams was one of seven partners who started up the Cairns and Tableland Motor Services Limited, which became well known as the "White Cars". These collected tourists who arrived by rail and boat at Cairns and took them to the Tablelands where they visited Malanda and its Falls, the Curtain Fig, Mount Quincan and the lakes. Visitors could hire boats at Lake Eacham from 1920 and there was a kiosk there from 1930. Lake Barrine's teahouse was built in 1927. The White Cars had a refuelling depot at Yungaburra which maintained 2 mechanics and passengers stayed at the hotel. The service continued for many years with branches at other tableland towns and the company survives as Whitecar Coaches.

The Lake Eacham Hotel advertised in 1926 that it was close to golf links and public tennis courts and films were shown in the hall behind the hotel for many years. The hotel also staged dances and other social events and during World War II was host to military personnel who claimed the lounge bar for their own. In the 1960s rooms on the ground floor of the 1920s wing were converted into motel units. The railway branch line to Yungaburra, Malanda and Tarzali was closed in 1963 and the station and line have been removed, so that the hotel now overlooks a small park name for Maud Kehoe. In 1971 Mrs Kehoe died, after an association with the hotel that had lasted more than sixty years, although it was run with the assistance of managers in the last few years of her life. In 1974 the hotel was sold and changed hands several times before being purchased by the current publicans in 1982. The hotel still caters for tourists and is an attraction in its own right.

== Description ==
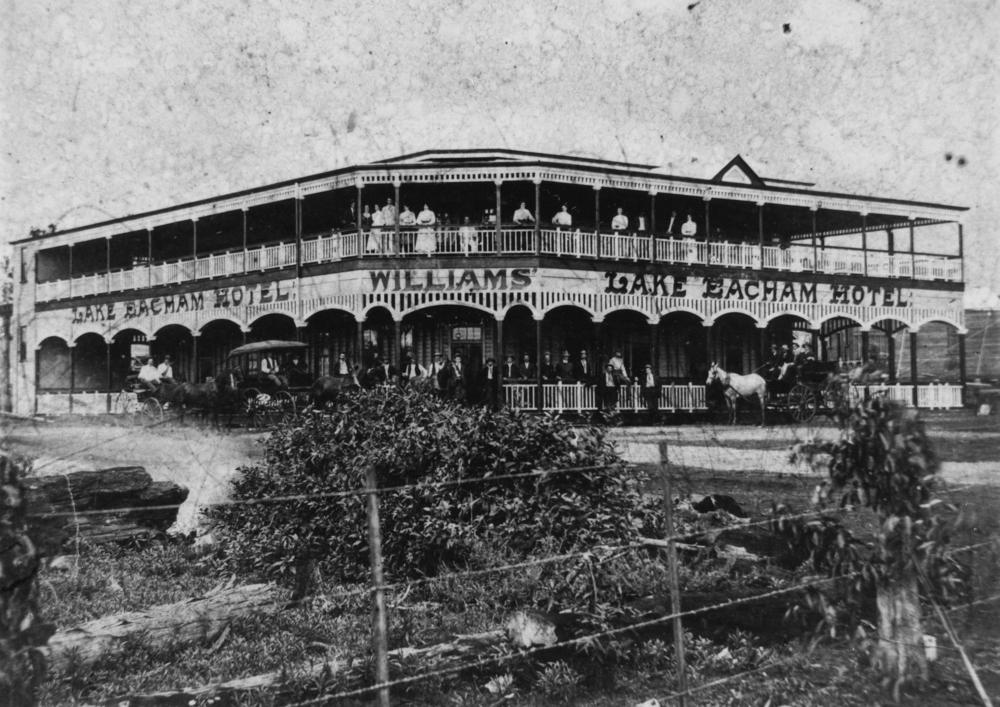
Lake Eacham Hotel, 1912

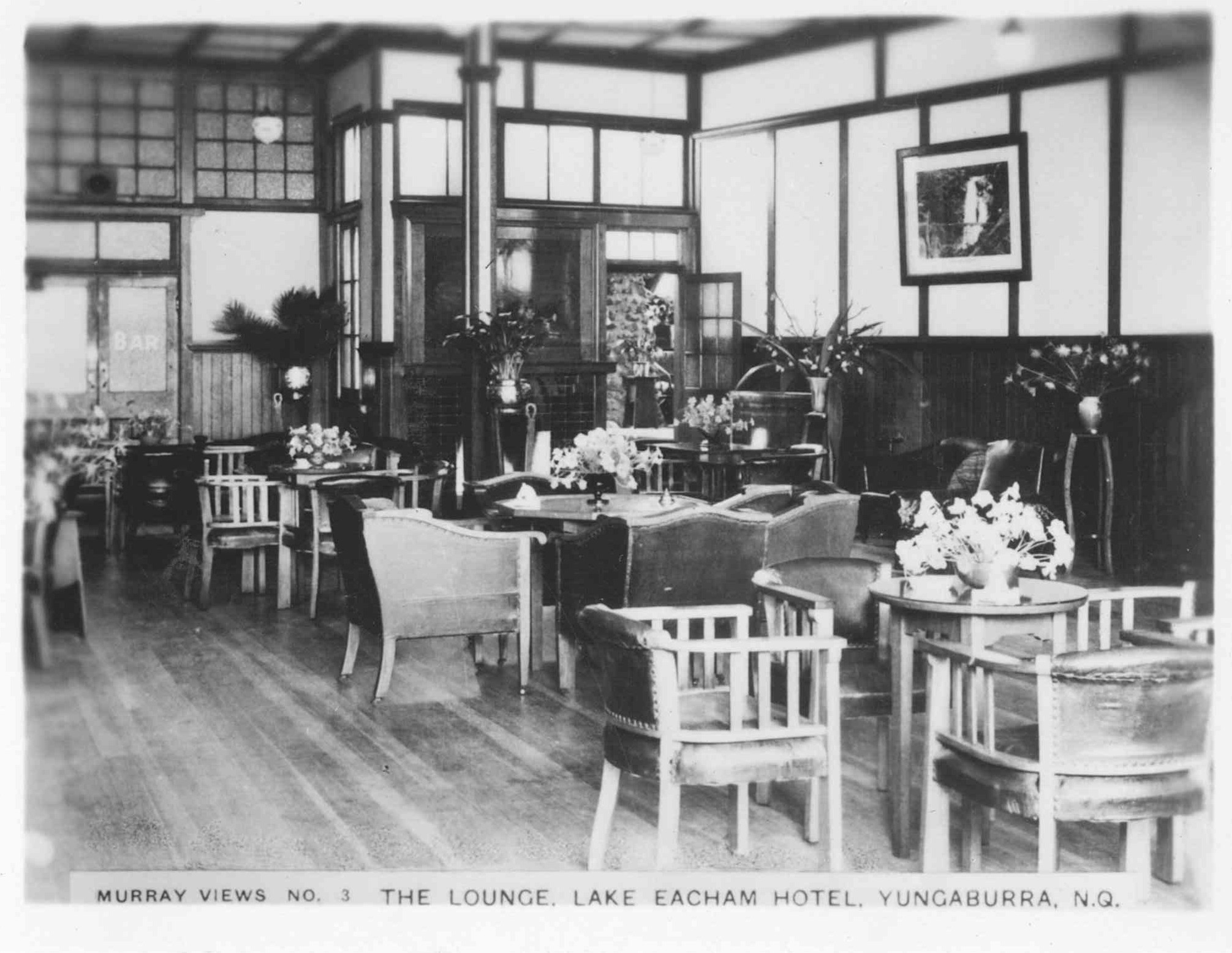
Interior, circa 1940

The Lake Eacham Hotel is a two storey timber building, L-shaped in plan, and has a hipped roof clad with corrugated iron. The roof and building are truncated at the corner where the entrance to the hall and main bar are located. The guests' entrance is in the later wing of the building and fronts the main road. At the street corner of the hotel there is a lamppost.

The original entrance hall has the public bar and games area to the left and a large dining room to the right. This is separated from the lounge by sliding doors with lead light panels and can itself be divided into two. The main entrance to the lounge, which also serves as a reception area, is from the street through lobby doors with "Williams" Lake Eacham Hotel' etched on the glass. The lounge is large and features extensive use of silky oak and other cabinet timbers in wainscotting, an elaborate staircase and joinery. The upper walls and ceiling are sheeted with fibrous cement and stained timber cover strips. Inside the door on the right hand side there is a freestanding timber and glass reception office and a guests' telephone booth. The room has a large fireplace at the rear end and retains most of its original furniture including marquetry tables and firescreen. At the rear is the lounge bar, which is also panelled and retains the original horseshoe bar with glass and timber glass cabinets above.

The kitchen contains a very large freestanding cast iron Metters range with ovens on all sides. This has been converted to burn oil but is not currently in use. The upper floor of the hotel contains bedrooms, manager's quarters and sitting areas for guests. The hotel currently has 38 bedrooms.

There is a barbecue area to the rear of the building, which leads onto a garden. A circular bush house, paths and walls of volcanic rock appear to be remnants of a formal garden. There is also a single storey timber building along Cedar Street thought to have been staff quarters.

== Heritage listing ==
Lake Eacham Hotel was listed on the Queensland Heritage Register on 21 October 1992 having satisfied the following criteria.

The place is important in demonstrating the evolution or pattern of Queensland's history.

As the Lake Eacham Hotel was built in 1910 and extended in 1926 principally to cater for tourists, is important in demonstrating the development of Yungaburra and of the early tourist industry in the region.

The place has potential to yield information that will contribute to an understanding of Queensland's history.

It is important as a good and intact example of an early resort hotel, with large and well-detailed public spaces.

The layout of the rooms and sequence of additions and facilities have the potential to provide information on the development of the hotel in response to changes in tourist requirements since 1910.

The place is important in demonstrating the principal characteristics of a particular class of cultural places.

The hotel is uncommon in the quality and intactness of its dining and reception areas and such details as the receptionist's office and guest telephone booth in the lounge, and the massive cast iron commercial range in the kitchen. It also retains much of its original furniture.

The place is important because of its aesthetic significance.

The Lake Eacham Hotel, a large and prominently sited building, has been a landmark in Yungaburra since it was built, featuring in tourist postcards. In form, scale and detail it makes a major visual contribution to the Yungaburra townscape.

The place has a special association with the life or work of a particular person, group or organisation of importance in Queensland's history.

The hotel has a strong association with the Williams family, who were important in the development of Yungaburra, and in particular with Maude Williams Kehoe, who ran the hotel for almost the whole period from its inception until her death.
