= C. laevigata =

C. laevigata may refer to:

- Carex laevigata, a European sedge
- Celtis laevigata, sugarberry or southern hackberry, a North American tree
- Cephalaria laevigata, a species in the genus Cephalaria
- Chaenotheca laevigata, a species in the lichen genus Chaenotheca
- Clidemia laevigata, a species of Clidemia (glory bush, Melastomataceae)
- Crataegus laevigata (often misspelled C. levigata), the Midland hawthorn or woodland hawthorn, a tree species
- Cryptocarya laevigata, the glossy laurel, a rainforest plant species

== Synonyms ==
- Cassia laevigata (disambiguation)
