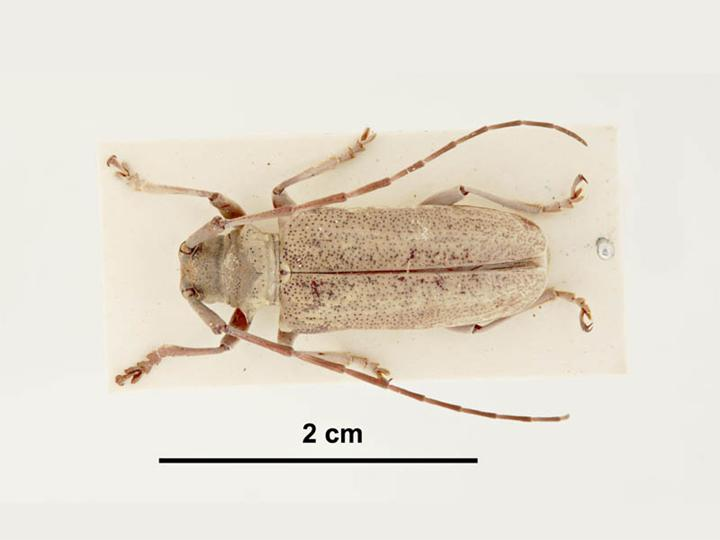

Scientific classification
- Kingdom: Animalia
- Phylum: Arthropoda
- Class: Insecta
- Order: Coleoptera
- Suborder: Polyphaga
- Infraorder: Cucujiformia
- Family: Cerambycidae
- Genus: Acalolepta
- Species: A. vastator

Binomial name
- Acalolepta vastator (Newman, 1847)

Synonyms
- Dihammus vastator (Newman, 1847); Haplohammus vastator (Newman, 1847); Monohammus vastator Newman, 1847

= Acalolepta vastator =

Fig longicorn beetle

Species of beetle

Acalolepta vastator (fig longicorn beetle or passion vine longhorn beetle) is a species of beetle in the family Cerambycidae. It was described by Newman in 1841, originally under the genus Monohammus. Breuning erroneously synonymised this species with Acalolepta mixta (Hope, 1841). It is native to and found throughout eastern Australia, including Tasmania and South Australia, as well as parts of South Asia. The Australian government recognize this species as a pest species. It feeds on grape vine (Vitis vinifera), papaya (Carica papaya) and curtain fig tree (Ficus virens).

Acalolepta vastator is gray-brown in color, around 21mm in length and covered in short, adpressed hairs covering the body. The antennae are around 1.5 times the body length. This species has an annual life cycle; adults are visible between October and March, whilst the larvae live inside tree trunks.

This species' life history has been well studied due to its pest activity, for example in the grapevines of New South Wales, Australia (see Goodwin & Pettit, 1994). This species has become such a pest to this area that uses of chemical control are being studied to manage their impact. This species is a Woodboring beetle, it can cause major damage to the vine trunk by tunneling through the trunk and into the roots, leading to die back and crop losses.
