= Cinnamon laurel =

Cinnamon laurel can refer to:

- Cryptocarya densiflora
- Cryptocarya grandis
