= Dansiea grandiflora =

Scientific classification
- Kingdom: Plantae
- Clade: Tracheophytes
- Clade: Angiosperms
- Clade: Eudicots
- Clade: Rosids
- Order: Myrtales
- Family: Combretaceae
- Genus: Dansiea
- Species: D. grandiflora

Binomial name
- Dansiea grandiflora Pedley

Species of flowering plant

Dansiea grandiflora is a species of rainforest tree that is endemic to Queensland, Australia. It is known to exist only within a limited zone of notophyll vine forest on Cape York Peninsula. It is listed as ‘Vulnerable’ under the Queensland Nature Conservation Act (1992).

One of only two species in the Dansiea genus along with Dansiea elliptica, Dansiea grandiflora was first described by Leslie Pedley in Flora of Australia Volume 18 (1990) from a specimen in relatively poor condition. Paul Irwin Forster later collected higher quality specimens from which he provided an amplified botanical description of the species in 1994. The genus name honours Sam Dansie (1927–2012), an Australian forester and plant collector.

== Description ==
Dansiea grandiflora is a tree that grows up to 10 m (33 ft) high. It has bark that is whitish in tone and lacks any significant distinguishing features. Its branches sit erect bearing petiolate leaves with upper and lower surfaces of different colours. The leaves initially feature adpressed trichomes but later become glabrescent except for upon the midrib below.

The petiole is 2–10 mm (0.079–0.394 in) long and approximately 1 mm (0.039 in) wide. The leaf blade can be oblong, elliptic or obovate and is sized approximately 13–60 mm (0.51–2.36 in) long and 8–30 mm (0.31–1.18 in) wide. The form of its tip can be acute to obtuse (occasionally minutely apiculate) whilst its base is cuneate.

The flowers are zygomorphic and 25–30 mm long with very short axillary peduncles approximately 5–10 mm long. The Calyx is 18–20 mm long featuring dense adpressed trichomes and orbicular bracteoles 15–16 mm in diameter that are attached to the lower half. The petals have a broad ovate form with a size approximately 6 mm long by 6 mm wide and are hairless apart from trichomes up to 0.3 mm long upon their margin. The stamens are inserted in the calyx tube in 2 series with a small appendage at the base of the filaments within the inner whorl. The outer filaments of the flowers are 5–6 mm long whilst the inner filaments are 6–7 mm long supporting oblong anthers which are 1.8–2 mm long and approximately 1.2 mm wide. The style is 8–10 mm long and the ovary is 10–11 mm long with a dense covering of trichomes.

== Distribution and habitat ==
Dansiea grandiflora is known only from the Kennedy Hill area on Bromley Station, Cape York Peninsula. It grows in notophyll vineforest on soils derived from granite, both along semi-pemianent watercourses and on adjacent ridges close to the sea.
