= Curtain Fig Tree =

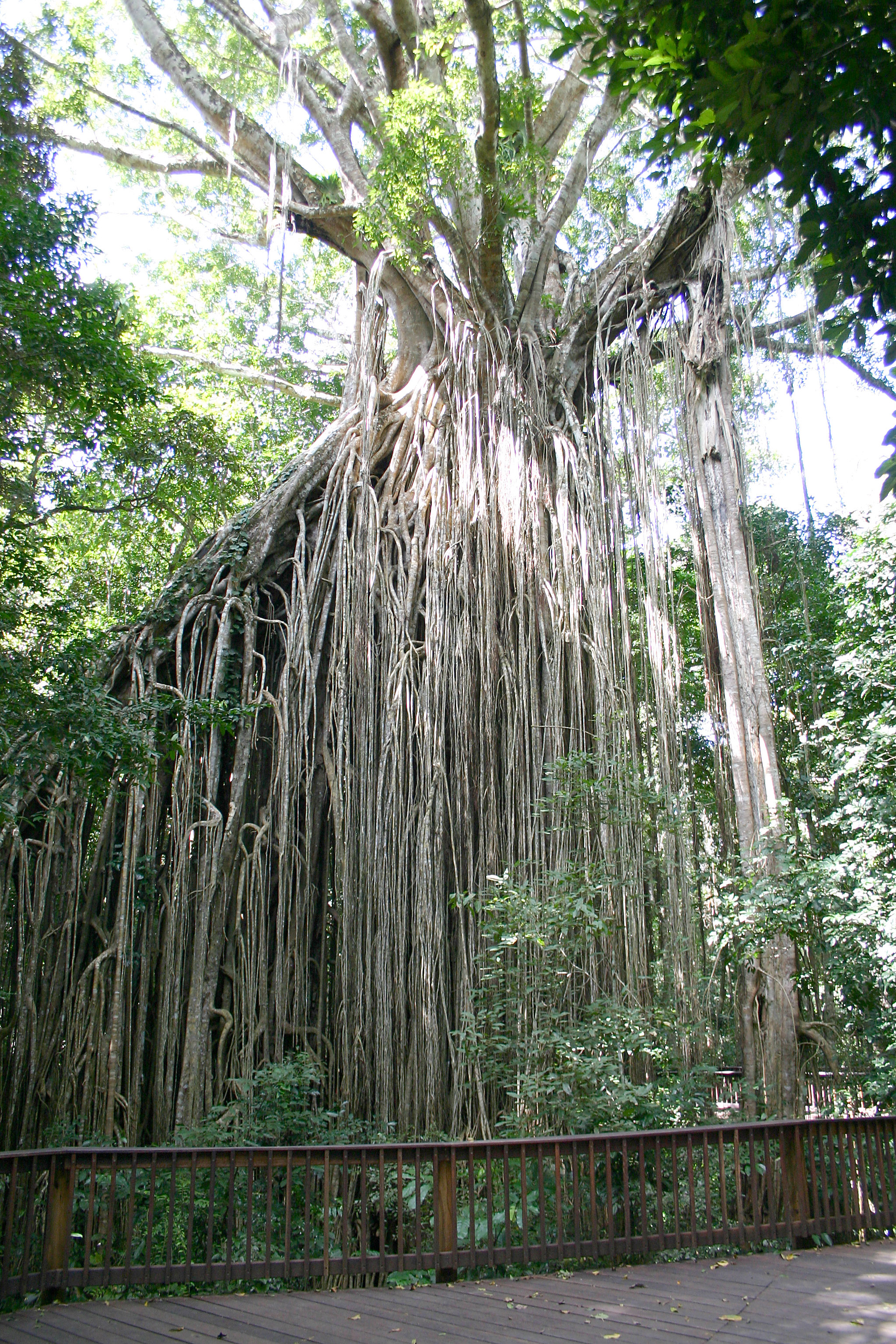
- Roots of the Curtain Fig Tree

- Location within Queensland
- 17.286°S 145.574°E
- Location: Curtain Fig Tree Road, East Barron, near Yungaburra, Tablelands Region, Queensland, Australia

Queensland Heritage Register
- Official name: The Curtain Fig Tree
- Type: state heritage (landscape)
- Designated: 3 December 2009
- Reference no.: 602734
- Significant period: 1920s

Curtain Fig Tree is a heritage-listed tree at Curtain Fig Tree Road, East Barron near Yungaburra, Tablelands Region, Queensland, Australia. It is one of the largest trees in Tropical North Queensland, Australia, and one of the best known attractions on the Atherton Tableland. It was added to the Queensland Heritage Register on 3 December 2009.

== Growth of a strangler fig ==
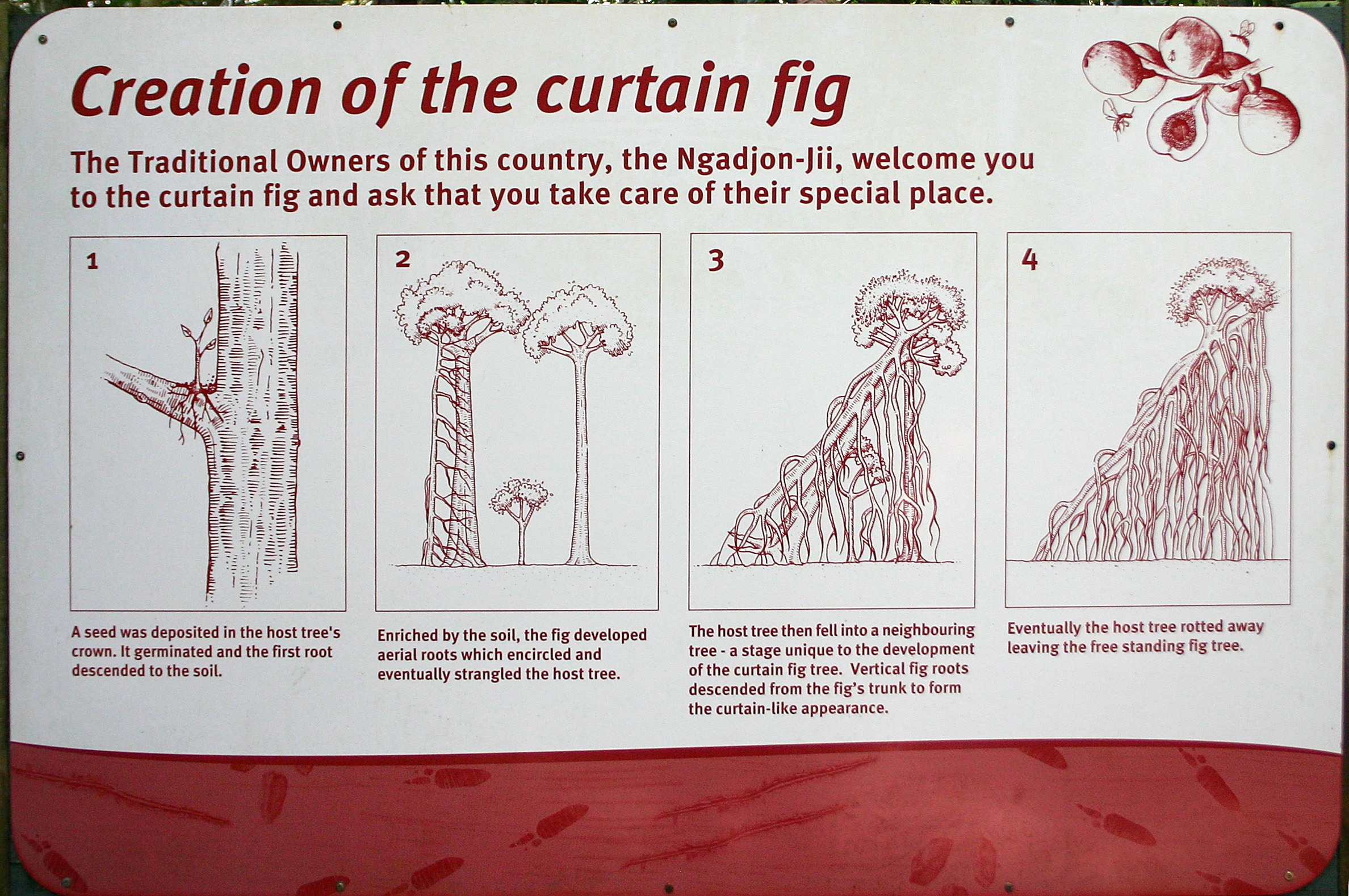
Creation of the Curtain Fig Tree

The Curtain Fig Tree is of the strangler fig species Ficus virens. Normally these figs germinate on top of another tree and try to grow roots into the ground. Once this important step is accomplished, the fig will grow vigorously, finally kill the hosting tree and then grow on independently. In this case, the hosting tree tilted towards a neighbouring tree, and the fig also grew around that one. Its curtain of aerial roots drops 15 metres (49 ft) (49 feet (15 m)) to the ground.

Although these figs kill their hosts, they are an epiphyte which basically feeds from the ground, unlike a parasitic plant which feeds from the sap of the host plant/tree.

== History ==
The Curtain Fig Tree is located in the Curtain Fig National Park about one kilometre south-west of the town of Yungaburra on the Atherton Tableland. It is estimated by the Queensland Parks and Wildlife Service to be at least 500 years old. Associated with organised tourism on the Tableland since the 1920s, the tree has been important in the development of the Cairns hinterland as a major tourist region in Queensland.

Since the 1890s the tropical vegetation of the Atherton Tableland has been known variously as scrub, jungle and more recently, mabi rainforest. The term "rainforest" was coined in 1898 but it was not a descriptor applied to the tropical vegetation of the Cairns region until the 1970s. Mabi rainforest was classified in the 1960s by ecologists, based on its physical characteristics and species composition. The name "mabi" is derived from a local Aboriginal word for the rare Lumholtz's tree-kangaroo, the largest mammal found in this rainforest. Logging, agriculture and urban development on the Tableland has resulted in significant loss of mabi rainforest and it is listed as endangered under the Commonwealth Environment Protection and Biodiversity Conservation Act 1999.

Early non-indigenous visitors to the Atherton Tableland often viewed the scrub in Romantic terms, fascinated by the dense and luxurious vegetation, especially the enormous trees covered with vines, and delicate and unusual ferns and orchids. A number of early twentieth century tourist attractions in the region, such as Fairyland (1907) and the Maze (1923) at Kuranda developed reflecting this view of the scrub. Other early commentators saw the fecundity of the scrub in a less favourable light, referring to it as gloomy, dank, and swarming with insects.

Ways of seeing the rainforest began to shift in the 1920s from the Romantic view of nature as a collection of fascinating curiosities and grand and sublime landscapes, to an ecological paradigm which views nature as a systemic interrelationship between all living things including humans, and their environment. In the 1930s the North Queensland Naturalists' Club lobbied for language change, seeking to replace "scrub", often used in a derogatory manner, by "jungle", in a bid to change community attitudes to the rainforest. Valuing the rainforest gained momentum with the rise of the environmental movement in the 1960s and 1970s.

Giant strangler figs such as the Curtain Fig Tree were considered to be wonders of nature. Strangler figs are epiphytes that develop when the seed of a fig germinates in the canopy of another tree and then sends roots to the ground. Once the root system is established, the fig grows vigorously, finally killing the host tree and then growing independently. The unusual formation of the Curtain Fig Tree was created when its vertical roots strangled the host causing it to fall into a neighbouring tree on a 45-degree angle. The extensive aerial roots of the strangler fig then dropped from the oblique angle of the fallen tree 15 metres (49 ft) to the forest floor, forming a "curtain". North Queensland strangler figs were portrayed photographically in The Queenslander from as early as 1896 and on postcards soon after 1900.

Descriptions of unusual tropical vegetation such as the giant strangler figs began to appear in tourist guides from the 1920s. The Curtain Fig Tree was well known as a tourist attraction by the 1920s when Whitecars, a local hire-car service, commenced day tours of the southern Tableland c. 1926, stopping to view the giant tree. Prior to this the only comfortable travel available to visitors to the southern Tableland was by train via the Kuranda Railway. Whitecars was established c. 1922 by Les Battle and Norm Graham, who developed a timetabled taxi service between Malanda, Yungaburra and Atherton, and between Malanda and Millaa Millaa, with three cars. They took advantage of the 1926 opening of the Gillies Highway, linking the southern Tableland with Cairns, to take Ned Williams into partnership as The Cairns Tableland Motor Service Ltd (known locally as Whitecars), to capitalise on the expected influx of tourists. In 1927 the company won the tender to transport passengers between Cairns and the southern Tableland via the Gillies Highway, and to operate day tours on the Tableland out of Yungaburra. In 1934 Whitecars introduced its first bus, capable of carrying 17 passengers. The development of Whitecars was integral to the development of tourism on the Tablelands and led to the increased popularity of attractions such as the Curtain Fig Tree.

By the 1950s, the Curtain Fig Tree was included in the Grand Tour/Tropical Wonderland Tour itineraries promoted by the Queensland Government Tourist Bureau (by then part of Queensland Railways). The Grand Tour operated during the winter months when a P&O ship would arrive at Cairns each week from Melbourne and Brisbane carrying around 200 passengers for a six-day stay in the region. Upon arrival passengers could join the Tropical Wonderland Tour, which included being taken by Whitecars to visit the attractions of the Atherton Tableland, including the Curtain Fig Tree.

As tourism diversified and private car ownership became more commonplace in the 1960s, tourism numbers to the Cairns hinterland increased, as did numbers visiting the Curtain Fig Tree. More tours became available and the tree was included on the itinerary of the Tableland Circular Tour in 1966. The popularity of the tree continued unabated and it was included in more tours during the 1970s including the Atherton Tableland Tour.

The Curtain Fig Tree remains a tourist attraction, but advances in science and a greater understanding of the natural environment mean the tree is now seen and portrayed in ecological terms. Since the 1970s, the area surrounding the Curtain Fig Tree has changed considerably: undergrowth has been trimmed back; interpretative signage educates tourists about the formation of the tree; and a boardwalk guides visitors to the tree. In December 1988, the Curtain Fig became part of the newly created Wet Tropics World Heritage Area, which consisted of 8,990 square kilometres of Far North Queensland rainforest.

A boardwalk was constructed in 2001 to allow wheelchair access for the disabled and to provide further protection for the tree and its surrounds, while permitting visitors to view it from all angles. Large numbers of tourists continue to visit the Curtain Fig Tree every year independently or as part of an organised tour. In 1994, 58,000 people arrived in commercial vehicles and 123,000 in private vehicles.

== Description ==
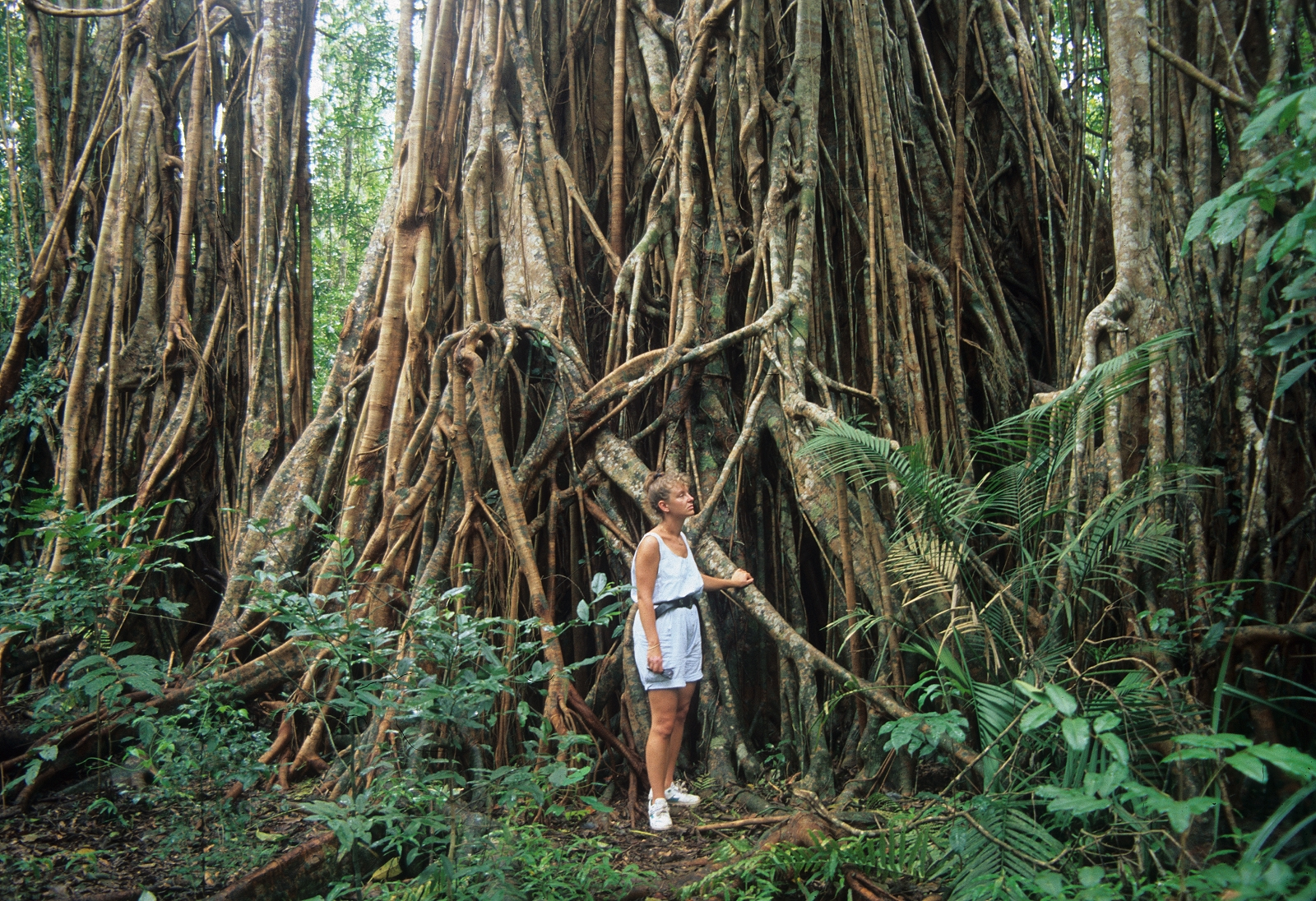
Curtin Fig Tree roots compared to a person in size

The Curtain Fig Tree (Ficus virens) is situated on Curtain Fig Tree Road approximately one kilometre south-west of the town of Yungaburra, in the Curtain Fig National Park within the Wet Tropics World Heritage Area. The vegetation type indigenous to the area is mabi rainforest (complex notophyll vine forest), now classified as endangered.

The Curtain Fig Tree is approximately 50 metres (160 ft) high with a trunk circumference of 39 metres (128 ft). The canopy extends in a radius of approximately 30 metres (98 ft) from the trunk of the tree. Extensive aerial roots, which are now thick and interwoven, drop 15 metres (49 ft) to the forest floor, forming a curtain oriented north-west to south-east over approximately 7 metres (23 ft). The host tree has since rotted away and the fig is now a free-standing tree.

Access to the Curtain Fig Tree which is approximately 50 metres (160 ft) from the road is via a 2 metres (6 ft 7 in) wide timber boardwalk from the roadside car park. At the beginning of the boardwalk there is a sheltered interpretation board that outlines the importance of the mabi rainforest and the history of the Curtain Fig Tree. The boardwalk then encircles the Curtain Fig. This boardwalk is easily accessible to wheelchairs and is raised above the forest floor (approximately 800 millimetres (31 in)) which also ensures visitors have minimal impact on the surrounding rainforest. Another interpretation board outlining how the tree was formed is located towards the end of the boardwalk, near the western face of the tree.

At the base of the Curtain Fig are timber posts and stones, remnants of a previous boardwalk that once passed much closer to the base of the tree. The boardwalk and interpretative signage are not considered to be of cultural heritage significance.

== Heritage listing ==
The Curtain Fig Tree was listed on the Queensland Heritage Register on 3 December 2009 having satisfied the following criteria.

The place is important in demonstrating the evolution or pattern of Queensland's history.

The Curtain Fig Tree (Ficus virens), a 500-year old strangler fig that has been associated with organised tourism on the Atherton Tableland since the 1920s, is important for its association with the evolution of tourism in Far North Queensland, demonstrating the attraction of the North Queensland natural environment for tourists. Its popularity is associated with the impact of the motor vehicle on Far North Queensland tourism. As an unusual natural phenomenon, the tree evoked a sense of wonder and curiosity amongst settlers on the Atherton Tableland in the late nineteenth and early twentieth centuries, and has been one of the most tourist-visited large trees on the Tableland since the 1920s. It remains a popular tourist destination.

The place is important because of its aesthetic significance.

The Curtain Fig Tree is an imposing and distinctive tree set within rare mabi rainforest. It is valued for its immense size and the curtain effect that has resulted from the thick and interwoven vertical root system. The tree's verdant and luxuriant growth has been valued by locals and tourists from the 1920s, and evokes a sense of awe, wonder, amazement and curiosity.

== See also ==
- List of individual trees
