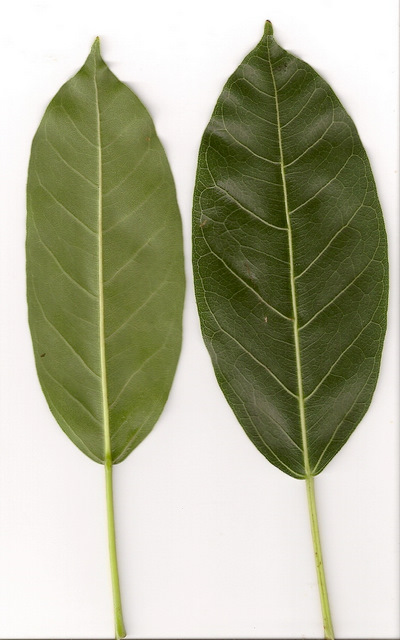
- Sub-lanceolate leaves

Scientific classification
- Kingdom: Plantae
- Clade: Tracheophytes
- Clade: Angiosperms
- Clade: Eudicots
- Clade: Rosids
- Order: Rosales
- Family: Moraceae
- Genus: Ficus
- Species: F. virens
- Variety: F. v. var. sublanceolata

Trinomial name
- Ficus virens var. sublanceolata (Miq.) Corner

Synonyms
- Ficus infectoria (Miq.) Domin

= Ficus virens var. sublanceolata =

Species of fig

Ficus virens var. sublanceolata is a banyan or strangler fig. It grows alongside the related white fig in the northern part of its range. They differ with narrower leaves, almost lanceolate in shape. Common names in Australia include white fig, sour fig, deciduous fig and banyan. A large example can be seen north of Murwillumbah beside the old Pacific Highway, not far from the state border with Queensland.

Plants of the World Online treats Ficus virens var. sublanceolata as a synonym of F. virens var. virens.

== Habitat and range ==
It grows as far south as the Clarence River, New South Wales, and up through Queensland, Torres Strait, Northern Territory, Western Australia and parts of South East Asia. It is often seen on alluvial soil in riverine rainforest.

== Description ==
It is a large tree in excess of 30 metres tall, with a trunk diameter exceeding 1.8 metres. It can be semideciduous. Heavily buttressed at the base. The bark is smooth and grey with various bumps and lenticels on the trunk. Small branches smooth, but with scars of leaf stipules. Leaves form with the stipules, and they are shed when the leaf develops.

=== Leaves ===
Alternate on the stem, 5 to 20 cm long, 2.5 to 6 cm wide. Ovate lanceolate in shape, which contrasts to the broader leaves of the white fig. Leaves thin, shiny green above, duller paler green below. Leaves with a short but noticeable tip, often curling to one side. Leaf base somewhat rounded. Leaf stalks narrow and long, 2 to 5 cm in length.

==== Venation ====
Leaf veins prominent, raised and evident on both sides of the leaf. Net veins attractive in pattern and shape near the leaf edge. 8 to 10 lateral veins, creamy green at around 60 degrees to the mid vein.

== Reproduction ==
Flowers form within a receptacle, a syconium. Flowers pollinated by fig wasps within the fig. The mature fig changes to a white, pinkish or brown colour with red spots, 10 mm in diameter, almost stalkless on the stem. Fruit ripe in Australia mostly June to August, or at all times during the year.

The figs eaten by a large variety of birds including Australasian figbird, green catbird, Lewin's honeyeater, topknot pigeon and pied currawong. Regeneration is achieved from fresh seed and cuttings. The marcotting technique of propagation is suited to Ficus virens var. sublanceolata.

== Uses ==
Suited to parks and large gardens as an ornamental tree. Often seen planted in Australian parks and botanic gardens. The timber is of no commercial use.
