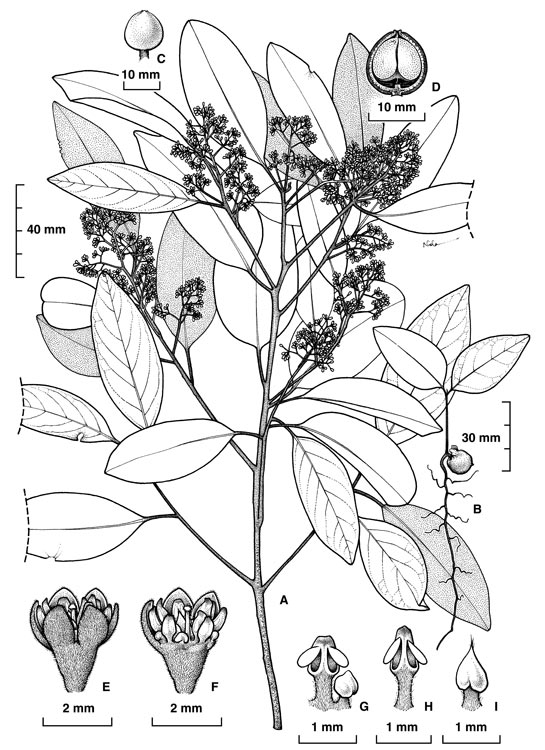

Conservation status
- Least Concern (IUCN 3.1)

Scientific classification
- Kingdom: Plantae
- Clade: Tracheophytes
- Clade: Angiosperms
- Clade: Magnoliids
- Order: Laurales
- Family: Lauraceae
- Genus: Cryptocarya
- Species: C. vulgaris

Binomial name
- Cryptocarya vulgaris B.Hyland

Synonyms
- Cryptocarya glaucescens var. coriacea Benth; Cryptocarya hypotephra F.Muell.

= Cryptocarya vulgaris =

Northern laurel

Species of flowering plant

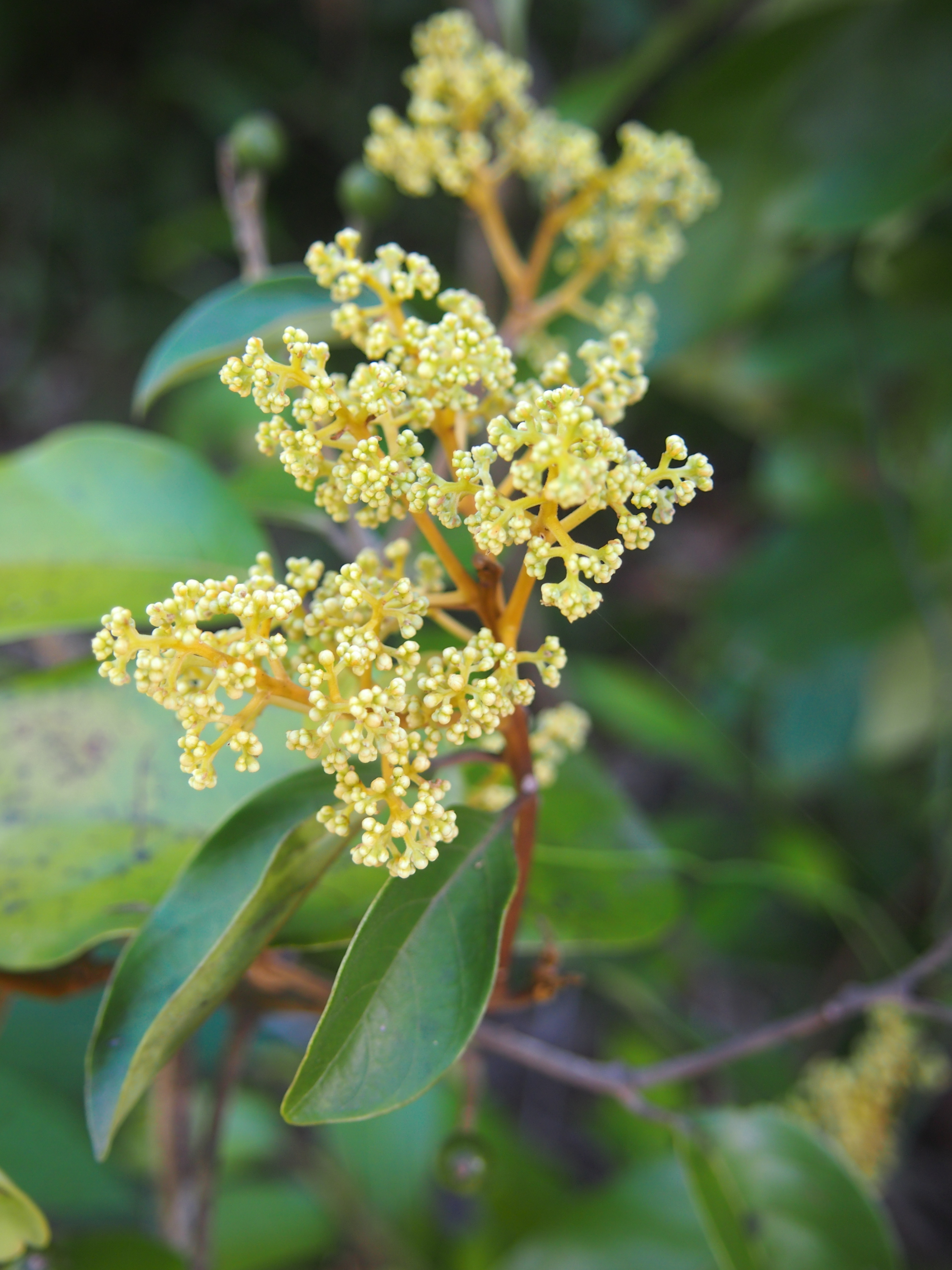
Flowers

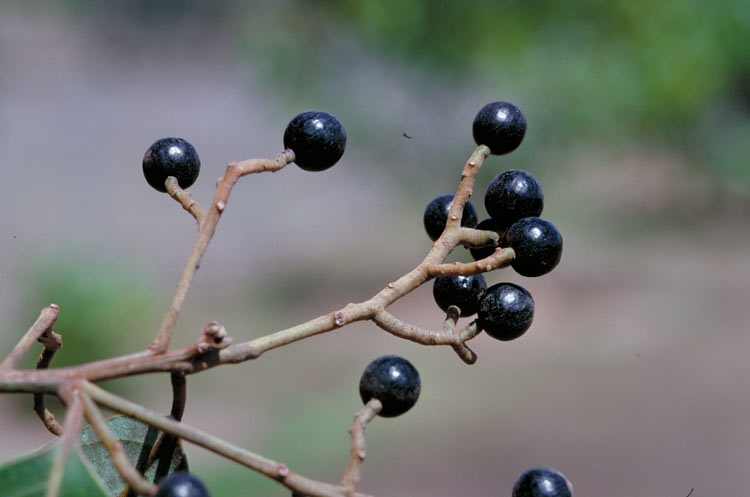
Fruit

Cryptocarya vulgaris commonly known as northern laurel, is a species of flowering plant in the family Lauraceae and is endemic to north Queensland. It is a tree with elliptic to oblong or lance-shaped leaves, creamy yellow and pale green, perfumed flowers, and spherical black drupes.

== Description ==
Cryptocarya vulgaris is a tree that typically grows to a height of up to 30 m (98 ft), its stems sometimes buttressed. Its leaves are elliptic to oblong or lance-shaped, 65–140 mm (2.6–5.5 in) long and 25–60 mm (1.0–2.4 in) wide, on a petiole 6–19 mm (0.24–0.75 in) long. The flowers are creamy yellow, pale green and perfumed, and arranged in panicles longer than the leaves. The perianth tube is 0.8–1.4 mm (0.031–0.055 in) long and 0.9–1.3 mm (0.035–0.051 in) wide, the outer tepals 1.0–1.5 mm (0.039–0.059 in) long and 0.8–1.1 mm (0.031–0.043 in) wide, the inner tepals 1.0–1.5 mm (0.039–0.059 in) long and 0.6–0.9 mm (0.024–0.035 in) wide. The outer anthers are 0.4–0.6 mm (0.016–0.024 in) long and 0.5 mm (0.020 in) wide, the inner anthers 0.5–0.7 mm (0.020–0.028 in) long and 0.4–0.5 mm (0.016–0.020 in) wide. Flowering occurs from November to April, and the fruit is usually a spherical black drupe, 8–13 mm (0.31–0.51 in) long and 8–12 mm (0.31–0.47 in) wide with creamy yellow cotyledons.

== Taxonomy ==
Cryptocarya vulgaris was first formally described in 1989 by Bernard Hyland in Australian Systematic Botany from specimens collected in the Little Pine Logging Area in 1979. The specific epithet (vulgaris) means 'common' or 'ordinary'.

== Distribution and habitat ==
This species of Cryptocarya grows in rainforest from sea level to 850 m (2,790 ft) elevation, from the Iron Range on Cape York Peninsula to Yeppoon in central eastern Queensland.

== Conservation status ==
This species of Cryptocarya is listed as "of least concern" under the Queensland Government Nature Conservation Act 1992.
