= Mabi forest =

Ecological community in Queensland, Australia

Coordinates: 17°17′19″S 145°34′09″E

Location of Mabi forest

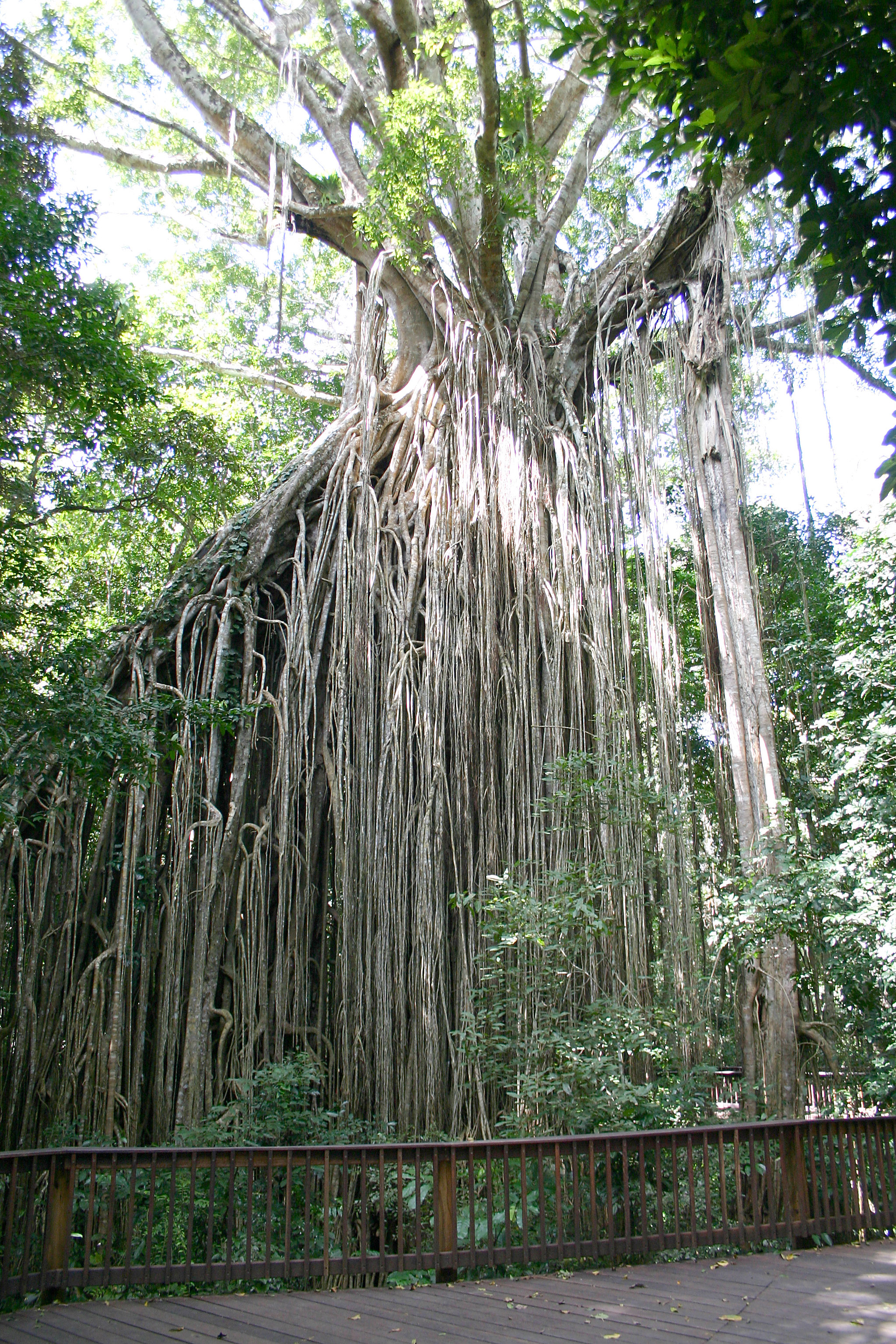
Curtain Fig, within North Queensland's largest remnant Mabi forest (4 km^{2})

Mabi forests (also known as Complex Notophyll Vine Forests) are a type of ecological community found in the Australian state of Queensland which is considered to be critically endangered and which consists of remnant patches found only either in North Queensland's Atherton Tablelands or at Shiptons Flat (also known as Kuna) along the Annan River.

== Distribution ==
Mabi forests, also known as Complex Notophyll Vine Forests, are confined to the Atherton Tableland with the exception of small remnant patch at Shiptons Flat which is also known as Kuna along the banks of Annan River.

Botanist Tony Irvine writing for Trees for the Evelyn and Atherton Tablelands Inc in 2004, described their distribution, then, as follows:

"..today remnants consist of Curtain Fig including Thomas Road, Picnic Crossing, Kairi Research Station, Cullamungie Pocket (slightly south of Pelican Point but on the eastern side of Tinaroo Dam), Halloran's Hill, Nasser's Property (Wongabel), Wongabel State Forest, Nicholas Creek, Tolga Scrub and other small scattered areas of less than 0.5 ha on private property. Curtain Fig is the largest remnant, roughly consisting of slightly less than 4 square kilometres in area."

== Source of name ==
The name "Mabi" is a locally indigenous Dyirbal and Yidiny language name for the Lumholtz tree kangaroo The name "Mabi forest" was given to this particular type of ecological community, as it is a forest type and habitat that supports high populations of Lumholtz tree kangaroos (aka Mabi)

== Likely conservation status ==
A Threatened Species Scientific Committee charged with advising on the conservation status of native species and ecological communities recommended the remnant Mabi forests be listed as "critically endangered" for the following reasons:

"There is only 1050 ha of Mabi Forest left, and this occurs as a series of small, isolated patches. Many of the remnant patches of Mabi Forest are being invaded by exotic smothering vines, and feral and domestic animals. The use of remnant patches of Mabi Forest by stock can impact on this ecological community through trampling, grazing and soil compaction."

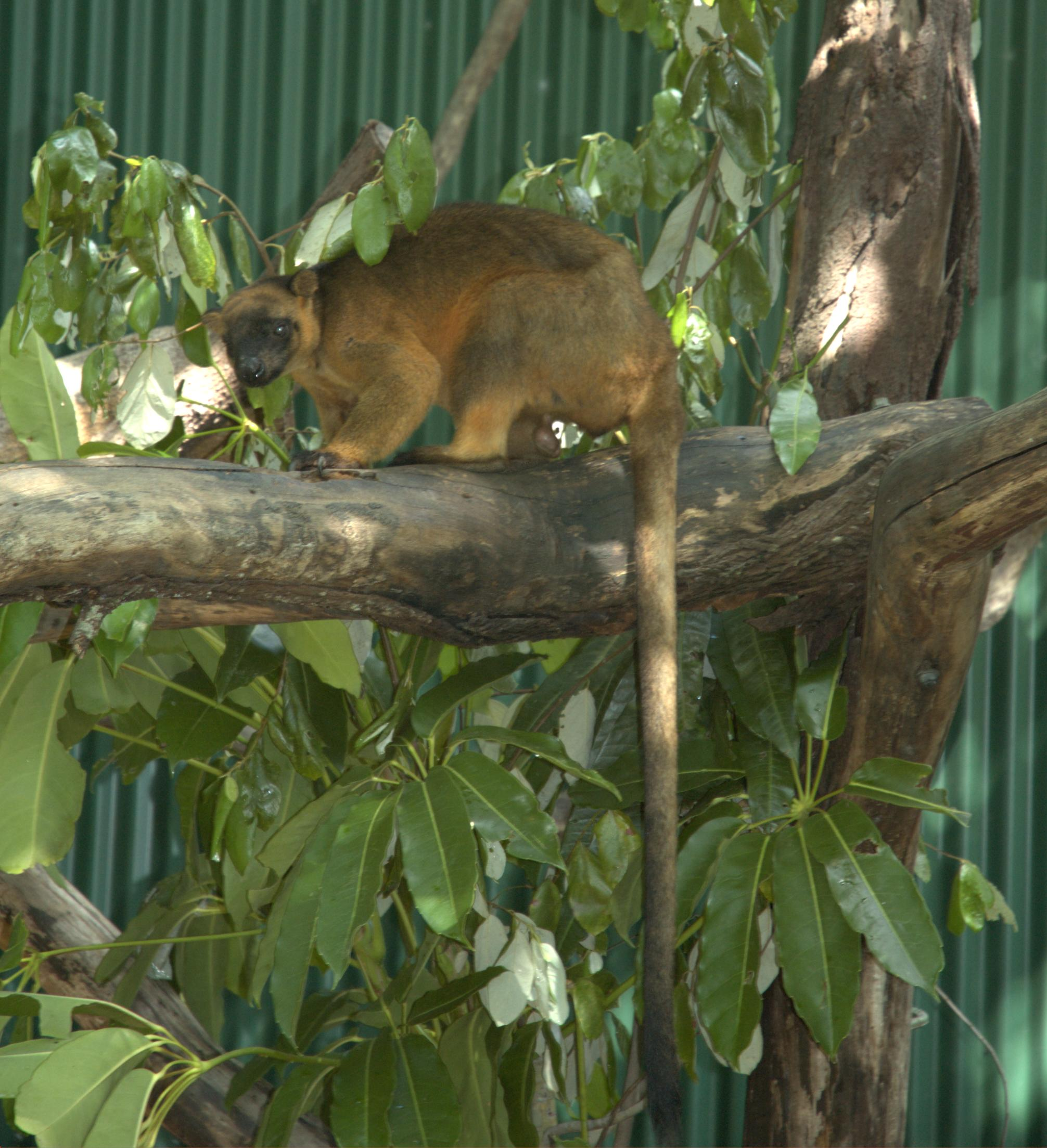
Lumholtz tree kangaroo (aka Mabi), large numbers of which are supported by Mabi forests, after which Mabi forests have been named

== Characteristics ==
Mabi forests are a particular kind of dense vine forest that grows on nutrient rich yet porous volcanic soils with annual rainfalls averaging between 1300 – 1600 mm and a severe seasonal dry around October of each year

These ecological communities can be distinguished from other forests types by their thick layer of shrubs and many vines growing beneath more open canopies of semi-evergreen and scattered deciduous trees (reaching upwards to between 25m and 45 m high).

Irvine described Mabi forests as follows:

"..the key thing about Mabi Forest...is that it has mostly tall canopy trees, many vines and a dense shrub layer."

"Key diagnostic features of Mabi forest are:

- Many trees with plank buttresses up to 45m tall
- A well-developed layer of specific shrub species and scrambling lawyer vines.
- A high presence of deciduous and semi-deciduous trees.
- Scattered large lianas and many slender vines
- Large-sized individual epiphytic ferns
- High presence of stinging bushes along edges and in large canopy gaps
- Usually has seasonal wilting of the understorey and seasonal heavy leaf fall."

Irvine further describes the multiple layers of typical Mabi forest as follows:

"The forest may have up to six layers of vegetation. The canopy is uneven and consists of:

1. Scattered emergent trees, 40-45m tall
2. A main canopy, 25-40m tall but occasionally as low as 14-20m...
3. A subcanopy, 12-20m tall
4. A lower layer, 6-8m tall. This layer tends to be absent in areas with lower upper canopies.
5. A predominantly dense shrub and scrambling lawyer vine zone 1-5m tall.
6. A zone of seedling trees, shrubs, vines and herbs 0-1m tall."
