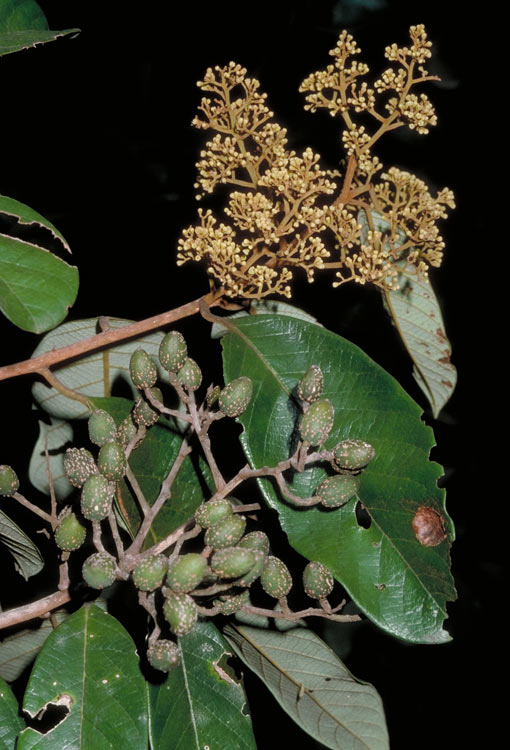
- Flowers and immature fruit

Conservation status
- Least Concern (IUCN 3.1)

Scientific classification
- Kingdom: Plantae
- Clade: Tracheophytes
- Clade: Angiosperms
- Clade: Magnoliids
- Order: Laurales
- Family: Lauraceae
- Genus: Cryptocarya
- Species: C. mackinnoniana

Binomial name
- Cryptocarya mackinnoniana F.Muell.

= Cryptocarya mackinnoniana =

Species of flowering plant

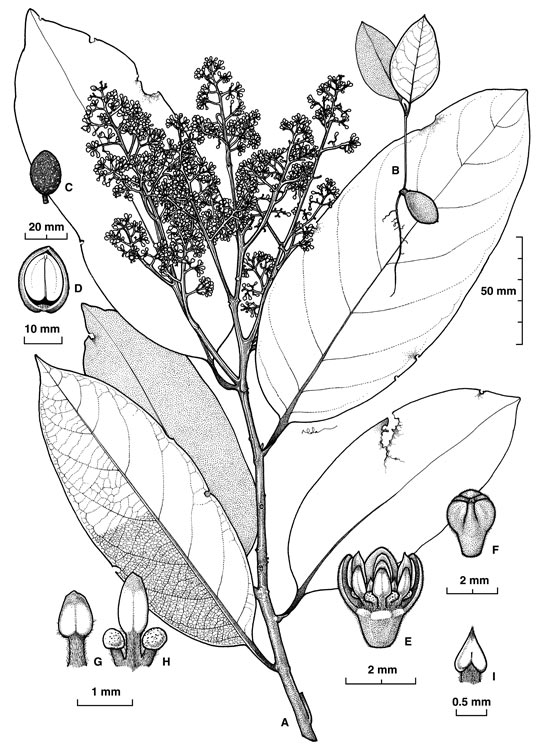
Illustration

Cryptocarya mackinnoniana commonly known as Mackinnons laurel, Mackinnons walnut, rusty laurel, rusty leaved laurel, rusty leaved walnut or koonjoongaroo, is a species of flowering plant in the family Lauraceae and is endemic to north Queensland. It is a tree with oblong to narrowly elliptic to oval leaves, creamy green and pale brown, unpleasantly perfumed flowers, and elliptic black drupes.

== Description ==
Cryptocarya mackinnoniana is a tree that typically grows to a height of up to 25 m (82 ft), its stems sometimes buttressed. Its leaves are oblong to narrowly elliptic to oval, 130–350 mm (5.1–13.8 in) long, 45–85 mm (1.8–3.3 in) wide and more or less glaucous, on a petiole 11–21 mm (0.43–0.83 in) long. The flowers are arranged in panicles in leaf axils and are longer than the leaves. They are creamy green, pale brown and unpleasantly perfumed. The perianth tube is 0.8–1.3 mm (0.03–0.05 in) long, 1.2–1.8 mm (0.05–0.07 in) wide. The outer anthers are 0.6–0.8 mm (0.02–0.03 in) long and 0.5–0.8 mm (0.02–0.03 in) wide, the inner anthers 0.7–0.9 mm (0.03–0.04 in) long and 0.4–0.5 mm (0.02–0.02 in) wide. Flowering occurs from October to April, and the fruit is an elliptical, sometimes oval or pear-shaped black drupe, 19–28 mm (0.7–1.1 in) long and 13–17 mm (0.51–0.67 in) wide with creamy cotyledons.

== Taxonomy ==
Cryptocarya mackinnoniana was first formally described in 1866 by Ferdinand von Mueller in his Fragmenta Phytographiae Australiae from specimens collected on the Seaview Range near Rockingham Bay.

== Distribution and habitat ==
This species of Cryptocarya grows in rainforest from sea level to 1,100 m (3,600 ft) elevation between the Iron Range on Cape York Peninsula to Ingham in north Queensland, and probably also in New Guinea.

== Ecology ==
The fruit of this species are eaten by several species of birds.

== Conservation status ==
Cryptocarya mackinnoniana is listed as of "least concern" by the Queensland Government Department of Education and Science.
