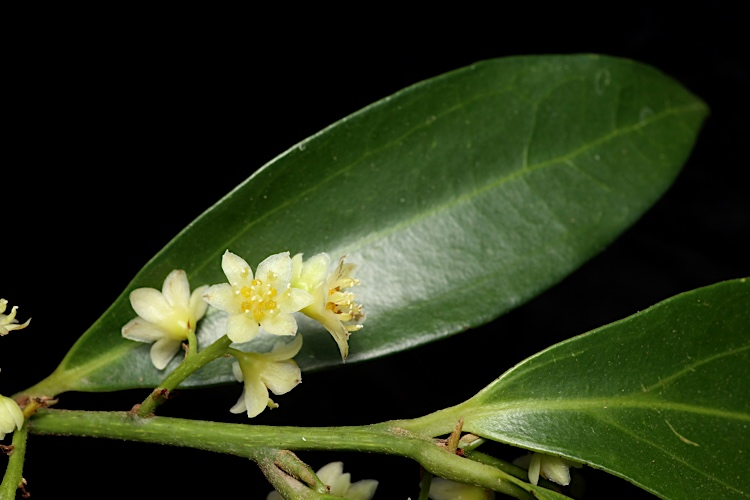
- In Mount Annan Botanical Garden

Conservation status
- Least Concern (IUCN 3.1)

Scientific classification
- Kingdom: Plantae
- Clade: Tracheophytes
- Clade: Angiosperms
- Clade: Magnoliids
- Order: Laurales
- Family: Lauraceae
- Genus: Cryptocarya
- Species: C. laevigata

Binomial name
- Cryptocarya laevigata Blume

Synonyms
- List: Caryodaphne australis (A.Cunn. ex Hook.) A.Braun; Caryodaphne costata Miq.; Caryodaphne laevigata (Blume) Nees; Caryodaphne laevigata var. angustifolia; Cryptocarya australis (A.Cunn. ex Hook.) Benth.; Cryptocarya bowiei Druce; Cryptocarya cinnamomifolia Merr.; Cryptocarya laevigata var. bowiei Kosterm.; Cryptocarya merrillii C.T.White; Cryptocarya trinervia Elmer; Cyanodaphne australis (A.Cunn. ex Hook.) Dragend.; Laurus australis A.Cunn. ex Hook.; Laurus bowiei Hook.; Oreodaphne bowiei Walp.

= Cryptocarya laevigata =

Species of tree

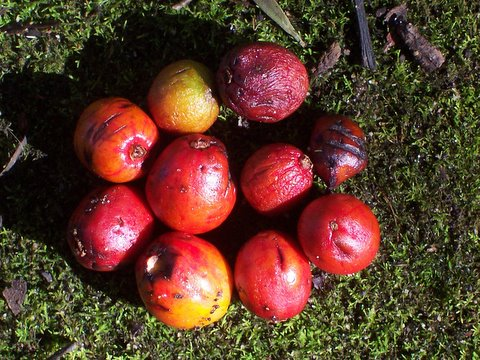
Fruit

Cryptocarya laevigata, commonly known as red-fruited laurel, glossy laurel or grey sassafras, is a species of flowering plant in the family Lauraceae and is native to Malesia, New Guinea and eastern Australia. It is a shrub or tree with lance-shaped to elliptic leaves, creamy white, pale green and perfumed flowers, and more or less spherical, red to orange-yellow drupes.

== Description ==
Cryptocarya laevigata is a shrub or tree that typically grows to a height of up to 7 m (23 ft), its stems not buttressed. Its leaves are lance-shaped to elliptic, 50–155 mm (2.0–6.1 in) long and 13–61 mm (0.5–2.4 in) wide on a petiole 2–11 mm (0.08–0.43 in) long. The flowers are arranged in racemes or panicles in leaf axils and shorter than the leaves. They are pale brown, creamy white, pale green and perfumed. The perianth tube is 1.1–1.8 mm (0.04–0.07 in) long, 1.0–2.8 mm (0.04–0.11 in) wide. The outer tepals are 2.2–3.0 mm (0.09–0.12 in) long and 1.4–2 mm (0.06–0.08 in) wide and the inner tepals are 2.3–3.2 mm (0.09–0.13 in) long and 1.4–2.1 mm (0.06–0.08 in) wide. The outer anthers are 0.7–1.2 mm (0.03–0.05 in) long and 1.4–2.0 mm (0.06–0.08 in) wide, the inner anthers 0.7–1.3 mm (0.03–0.05 in) long and 0.4–0.7 mm (0.02–0.03 in) wide. Flowering occurs from September to December, and the fruit is a spherical, red to orange-yellow drupe 17–33 mm (0.7–1.3 in) long and 17–38 mm (0.7–1.5 in) wide with creamy cotyledons.

== Taxonomy ==
Cryptocarya laevigata was first formally described in 1826 by Carl Ludwig Blume in his Bijdragen tot de Flora van Nederlandsch Indie. The specific epithet (laevigata) means "having a polished surface".

== Distribution and habitat ==
Cryptocarya laevigata occurs in Sumatra, Peninsular Malaysia, Borneo, Java, Sulawesi, the Philippines New Guinea, the Bismarck Archipelago, Solomon Islands, and Australia, where it is found in New South Wales north from Lismore and in Queensland. It grows in tropical and subtropical moist broadleaf forests.

== Uses in horticulture ==
The glossy leaves, small size and attractive red fruit make it suitable as an ornamental tree. Like most Australian Cryptocarya fruit, removal of the slimy red aril is advised to assist seed germination. Roots and shoots usually appear within three to twelve months.
