= Dansiea =

Scientific classification
- Kingdom: Plantae
- Clade: Tracheophytes
- Clade: Angiosperms
- Clade: Eudicots
- Clade: Rosids
- Order: Myrtales
- Family: Combretaceae
- Genus: Dansiea; Byrnes

Genus of flowering plants

Dansiea is a genus of flowering plants belonging to the family Combretaceae.

Its native range is Northeastern Australia.

The genus name honours Samuel Justin Dansie (1927–2012), an Australian forester and plant collector, it was published in Austrobaileya Vol.1 on page 385 in 1981.

Species known:

- Dansiea elliptica Byrnes
- Dansiea grandiflora Pedley
