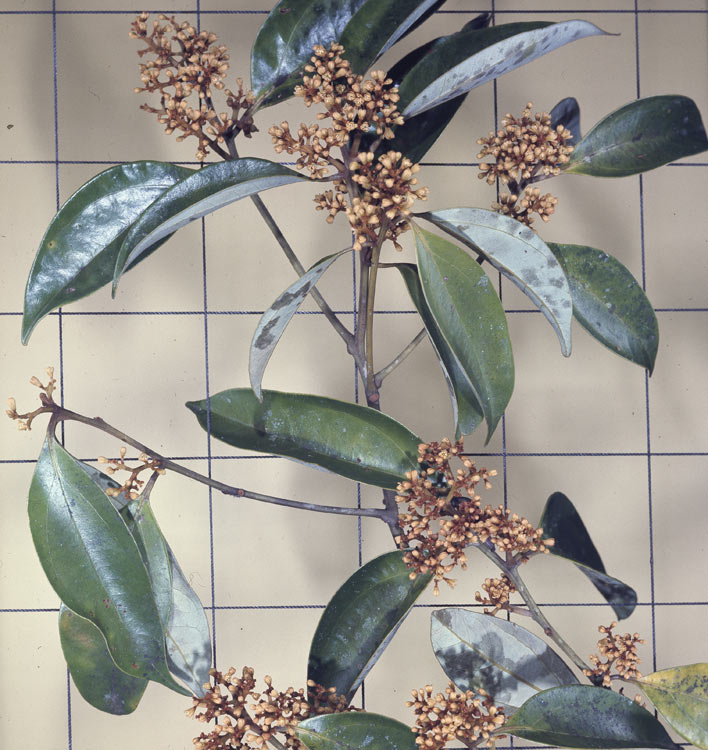

Conservation status
- Least Concern (IUCN 3.1)

Scientific classification
- Kingdom: Plantae
- Clade: Tracheophytes
- Clade: Angiosperms
- Clade: Magnoliids
- Order: Laurales
- Family: Lauraceae
- Genus: Cryptocarya
- Species: C. densiflora

Binomial name
- Cryptocarya densiflora Blume

Synonyms
- Caryodaphne densiflora Blume ex Nees; Cryptocarya affinis Merr.; Cryptocarya annamensis C.K.Allen; Cryptocarya camptodroma C.K.Allen; Cryptocarya cinnamomifolia Benth.; Cryptocarya fleuryi A.Chev. ex H.Liu; Cryptocarya laevigata Elmer, nom. illeg. homonym. post.; Cryptocarya oligoneura Kosterm.; Cryptocarya scalariformis C.K.Allen; Laurus triplinervia Reinw. ex Blume

= Cryptocarya densiflora =

Cinnamon laurel, white laurel

Species of plant in the laurel family

Cryptocarya densiflora, commonly known as cinnamon laurel or white laurel, is a tree in the laurel family and is native to north Queensland and parts of Indonesia. Its leaves are lance-shaped to elliptic, the flowers yellowish-green and brown, tube-shaped but not perfumed, and the fruit is a flattened spherical, reddish maroon drupe that turns black when ripe.

== Description ==
Cryptocarya densiflora is a tree that typically grows to a height of 30 m (98 ft), its stems sometimes buttressed. Its leaves are lance-shaped to elliptic, 65–150 mm (2.6–5.9 in) long and 25–60 mm (0.98–2.36 in) wide on a petiole 7–16 mm (0.28–0.63 in) long. The flowers are yellowish-green and pale brown, arranged in panicles more or less longer than the leaves but not perfumed, the perianth tube 1.0–1.6 mm (0.039–0.063 in) long an 1.4–1.9 mm (0.055–0.075 in) wide and hairy inside. The outer tepals are 1.9–2.7 mm (0.075–0.106 in) long and 0.9–1.4 mm (0.035–0.055 in) wide, the outer anthers 0.6–0.9 mm (0.024–0.035 in) long and about 0.6 mm (0.024 in) wide, the inner anthers 0.7–1.0 mm (0.028–0.039 in) long and about 0.5 mm (0.020 in) wide. Flowering occurs from October to January, and the fruit is a flattened, reddish-maroon drupe 11–14 mm (0.43–0.55 in) long and 13–19.5 mm (0.51–0.77 in) wide, turning black when ripe.

== Taxonomy ==
Cryptocarya densiflora was first formally described in 1826 by Carl Ludwig Blume in Bijdragen tot de Flora van Nederlandsch Indie from specimens collected on Mount Salak in Indonesia.

== Distribution and habitat ==
The species ranges from southern China through Indochina (Cambodia, Laos, Thailand, and Vietnam), Malesia (Peninsular Malaysia, Sumatra, Borneo, Java, the Philippines, and the Lesser Sunda Islands), and New Guinea to Queensland. In Queensland it is found from the McIlwraith Range on Cape York Peninsula to Eungella in far north Queensland. Cinnamon laurel grows as an understorey tree in mountain rainforest at elevations of 450–1,200 m (1,480–3,940 ft).
