= White Cat =

White Cat may refer to:

- Deaf white cat, domestic cats with a pure white coat who suffer from congenital deafness
- The White Cat (fairy tale), French fairy tale by Madame d'Aulnoy
- White Cat (novel), 2010 novel by Holly Black
- Black Cat, White Cat, 1998 Yugoslav romantic comedy film
- White Cat Black Cat, Hong Kong children's comic book series
- The White Cat (film), a 1950 Swedish drama film directed by Hasse Ekman
- Victoria the White Cat, a character from the 1981 musical Cats
- Ora White Cat, a battery electric city car
