= Black Car =

Black Car or variant thereof, may refer to:

== Music ==
- Black Cars (1985 album), album by Gino Vannelli
- BlackCar (2003 album), album by the eponymous British rock band 'BlackCar'
- BlackCar (rock band), British rock band

=== Songs ===
- "Black Car" (Miriam Bryant song)
- "Black Car", a song from the soundtrack album for the 2019 film Drive
- "Black Car", a song by Beach House from their 2017 album 7
- "Black Car", a song by Quintaine Americana

== Vehicles ==
- black car, the title character of the 1977 horror film "The Car"
- "Black Car", a 1930s race car driven by St John Horsfall
- "The Black Car" (French: La Voiture Noire), a 2019 special edition built by Bugatti Automobiles
- Black Prince, a British 4 wheeled cyclecar
- Hackney carriage, the London black taxi cars
- black car, the call-cabs of New York City, see Taxicabs of New York City

== Other uses ==
- black car service, a car service providing limousines
- Black Car Service, a subsidiary of Transdev

== See also ==
- "New Black Car" (2002 song), song off the album Swim by 'July for Kings'
- "Big Black Car" (1985 song), song by 'Big Star' off the album Third/Sister Lovers
- "Big Black Car" (2006 song), song by Dave Palmer off the album Romance (Dave Palmer album)
- Big Black Car, a house improv comedy team at Peoples Improv Theater
- Hearse
- Limousine
- Black Maria police van
- U.S. G-man black Chevrolet Suburbans
