= Cryptocarya grandis =

Conservation status
- Least Concern (IUCN 3.1)

Scientific classification
- Kingdom: Plantae
- Clade: Tracheophytes
- Clade: Angiosperms
- Clade: Magnoliids
- Order: Laurales
- Family: Lauraceae
- Genus: Cryptocarya
- Species: C. grandis

Binomial name
- Cryptocarya grandis B.Hyland

Species of tree

Cryptocarya grandis, commonly known as cinnamon laurel or white laurel, is a tree in the laurel family and is endemic to north Queensland. Its leaves are lance-shaped to elliptic, the flowers creamy-green, unpleasantly perfumed and tube-shaped, and the fruit a spherical drupe.

== Description ==
Cryptocarya grandis is a tree that typically grows to a height of up to 35 m (115 ft), its stems sometimes buttressed and its twigs glabrous. Its leaves are lance-shaped to elliptic, 65–155 mm (2.6–6.1 in) long and 30–75 mm (1.2–3.0 in) wide on a petiole 6–17 mm (0.24–0.67 in) long. The flowers are arranged in panicles longer than the leaves and are unpleasantly perfumed, the perianth 0.9–1.6 mm (0.035–0.063 in) long and 1.2–1.6 mm (0.047–0.063 in) wide and hairy near the tip. The outer tepals are 1.6–2.4 mm (0.063–0.094 in) long and 1.0–1.3 mm (0.039–0.051 in) wide and the inner tepals are 1.6–2.3 mm (0.063–0.091 in) long and 1.3–1.6 mm (0.051–0.063 in) wide. The outer anthers 0.6–0.9 mm (0.024–0.035 in) long and 0.6–0.8 mm (0.024–0.031 in) wide, the inner anthers 0.7–0.8 mm (0.028–0.031 in) long and 0.4–0.6 mm (0.016–0.024 in) wide and hairy. Flowering occurs from November to February, and the fruit is spherical drupe 13–16 mm (0.51–0.63 in) long and 14–22 mm (0.55–0.87 in) wide with creamy-white cotyledons.

== Taxonomy ==
Cryptocarya grandis was first formally described in 1989 by Bernard Hyland in Australian Systematic Botany from specimens collected by Bruce Gray in 1980.

== Distribution and habitat ==
Cinnamon laurel grows in rainforest from sea level to 1,000 m (3,300 ft) elevation from near the Iron Range to Eungella in north Queensland.
