= Cassia laevigata =

Cassia laevigata is a synonym for the plants:

- Senna occidentalis, coffee senna
- Senna septemtrionalis, arsenic bush
