= Acalolepta mixta =

Scientific classification
- Kingdom: Animalia
- Phylum: Arthropoda
- Clade: Pancrustacea
- Class: Insecta
- Order: Coleoptera
- Suborder: Polyphaga
- Infraorder: Cucujiformia
- Family: Cerambycidae
- Genus: Acalolepta
- Species: A. mixta

Binomial name
- Acalolepta mixta (Hope, 1841)

Synonyms
- Dihammus mixtus (Hope, 1841); Monohammus mixtus Hope, 1841; Acalolepta mixtus (Hope, 1841) (misspelling); Acalolepta bispinosa (Breuning, 1935); Acalolepta bispinosipennis Breuning, 1969; Acalolepta savoensis Breuning, 1979; Acalolepta sumbawana Breuning, 1969; Dihammus bispinosus Breuning, 1935

Species of beetle

Acalolepta mixta is a species of beetle in the family Cerambycidae. It was described by Frederick William Hope in 1841, originally under the genus Monohammus. It is known from Australia, and was introduced to the Solomon Islands, Indonesia (Sulawesi, Sumbawa, Savu), Singapore and Vietnam. It feeds on Theobroma cacao, Adansonia digitata, Mangifera indica, Excoecaria agallocha, and Moringa oleifera.
