= Ficus virens =

Conservation status
- Least Concern (IUCN 3.1)

Scientific classification
- Kingdom: Plantae
- Clade: Tracheophytes
- Clade: Angiosperms
- Clade: Eudicots
- Clade: Rosids
- Order: Rosales
- Family: Moraceae
- Genus: Ficus
- Species: F. virens

Binomial name
- Ficus virens Aiton

Subspecies
- Ficus virens var. dasycarpa Corner; Ficus virens var. dispersa Chantaras.; Ficus virens var. virens

Synonyms
- Synonymy: synonyms of subsp. virens: Ficus aegeirophylla (Miq.) Miq. Ficus ampla Kunth & C.D.Bouché Ficus apiculata (Miq.) Miq., nom. illeg. homonym. post. Ficus carolinensis Warb. Ficus caulobotrya var. fraseri (Miq.) Miq. Ficus cunninghamii (Miq.) Miq. Ficus fraseri (Miq.) F.Muell., nom. illeg. homonym. post. Ficus glabella Blume Ficus glabella f. grandifolia Miq. Ficus glabella var. nesophila (Miq.) K.Schum. Ficus infectoria Miq., nom. illeg. Ficus infectoria var. aegeirophylla (Miq.) Miq. Ficus infectoria var. cunninghamii (Miq.) Domin Ficus infectoria var. forbesii King Ficus infectoria var. fraseri (Miq.) Domin Ficus infectoria var. lambertiana (Miq.) King Ficus infectoria var. psychotriifolium (Miq.) Domin Ficus infectoria var. typica Domin, not validly publ. Ficus infectoria var. wightiana (Miq.) King Ficus infrafoliacea Buch.-Ham. ex Sm. Ficus lacor var. cunninghamii (Miq.) M.F.Barrett Ficus lacor var. lambertiana (Miq.) M.F.Barrett Ficus lambertiana (Miq.) Miq. Ficus monticola Miq. Ficus nesophila (Miq.) F.Muell. Ficus nitentifolia S.Moore Ficus pilhasi Sm. Ficus prolixa var. carolinensis (Warb.) Fosberg Ficus psychotriifolia (Miq.) Miq. Ficus racemosa Willd., nom. illeg. homonym. post. Ficus saxophila var. sublanceolata Miq. Ficus scandens Buch.-Ham., nom. illeg. homonym. post. Ficus syringifolia C.Fraser ex C.Moore, nom. illeg. homonym. post. Ficus terminalioides Griff. Ficus terminalis Roth Ficus timorensis (Miq.) Miq., nom. illeg. homonym. post. Ficus virens var. glabella (Blume) Corner Ficus virens var. lambertiana (Miq.) Raizada Ficus virens var. matthewii Chantaras. Ficus virens var. sublanceolata (Miq.) Corner Ficus virens var. wightiana (Miq.) Chithra Ficus wightiana (Miq.) Benth. Urostigma aegeirophyllum Miq. Urostigma apiculatum Miq. Urostigma canaliculatum Miq. Urostigma cunninghamii Miq. Urostigma fraseri Miq. Urostigma glabellum (Blume) Miq. Urostigma infectorium Miq., nom. illeg. homonym. post. Urostigma lambertianum Miq. Urostigma moritzianum Miq. Urostigma nesophilum Miq. Urostigma perseifolium Miq. Urostigma psychotriifolium Miq. Urostigma timorense Miq. Urostigma wightianum Miq.

Species of epiphyte

Ficus virens is a semi-deciduous tree of the genus Ficus. It is native to tropical and subtropical regions of India, the Himalayas, Indochina, southern and central China, Malesia, Papuasia, northern Australia, and the Caroline Islands, New Caledonia, and Vanuatu in the western Pacific. Its common name is white fig; it is locally known as pilkhan and in the Kunwinjku language it is called manbornde. Like many figs, its fruits are edible. One of the most famous specimens of this tree is the Curtain Fig Tree of the Atherton Tableland, near Cairns, a popular tourist attraction. Another famous example is the Tree of Knowledge in Darwin.

== Description ==
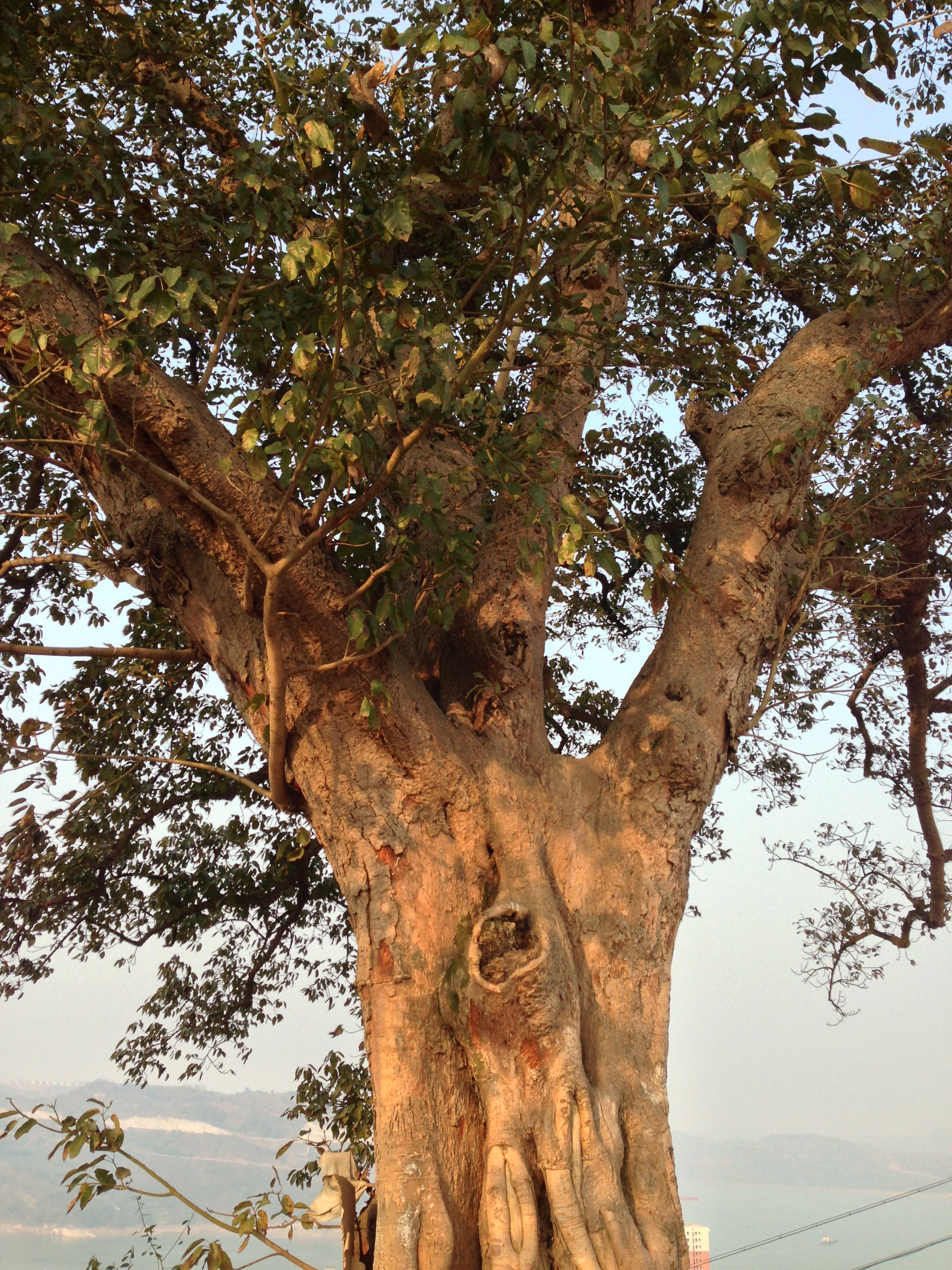

It is a medium-sized to medium-sized tree which grows to a height of 24–24 metres (79–79 ft) In dry areas and up to 32 metres (105 ft) tall in wetter areas. It is a fig tree belonging to the group of trees known as strangler figs, which is because its seeds can germinate on other trees and grow to strangle and eventually kill the host tree.

It has two marked growth periods in its Indian environment: in spring (February to early May), and in the time of the monsoon rains (i.e. June to early September). The new leaves are a shade of reddish pink.

This is a very massive tree in which the width of the crown can sometimes exceed the height of the tree. Campbell exhibits a photograph of an individual which he states had a girth at breast height of 37 m (121 ft), or a DBH of 11.5 m (38 ft). The photo shows no sign of buttresses or a basal swelling.

== Varieties ==
Plants of the World Online accepts three varieties:

- Ficus virens var. dasycarpa Corner – northern Australia (Northern Territory, Queensland, and Western Australia)
- Ficus virens var. dispersa Chantaras. – Borneo, the Lesser Sunda Islands, Maluku, Papuasia, Queensland, Vanuatu, and New Caledonia
- Ficus virens var. virens – India and China to northern and eastern Australia, New Caledonia, Vanuatu, and the Caroline Islands.

Ficus virens var. sublanceolata occurs the subtropical rainforest of northeastern New South Wales, and south eastern Queensland in Australia. Plants of the World Online treats it as a synonym of var. virens.

== Use as food ==
The leaves are known in Thai cuisine as phak liap (Thai: ผักเลียบ). They are eaten boiled as a vegetable in Northern Thai curries, referred to in the Northern dialect as phak hueat (ผักเฮือด).
