= Leaf size =

Classifications of plant leaves by size

Leaf size of plants can be described using the terms megaphyll, macrophyll, mesophyll, microphyll, nanophyll and leptophyll (in descending order) in a classification devised in 1934 by Christen C. Raunkiær and since modified by others. Definitions vary, some referring to length and others to area. Raunkiaer's original definitions were by leaf area, and differed by a factor of nine at each stage. Some authors have simplified the system to make it specific to particular climates, and have introduced extra terms including notophyll, picophyll, platyphyll and subleptophyll.

In ecology, microphyll and similar terms based on blade size of the leaf are used to describe a flora, for example, a "microphyll rainforest" is often defined as a forest where the dominant trees have leaves less than 7.5 cm in length.

== Raunkiaer's work ==
Christen C. Raunkiaer proposed using leaf size as a relatively easy measurement that could be used to compare the adaptation of a plant community to dryness.

We have for a long time been aware of a series of different adaptations in the structure of plants enabling them to endure excessive evaporation, and thus allowing them to live in place where the environment determines intense evaporation, or where the conditions of water absorption of the ground are unfavourable either physically or physiologically. Examples of such structures are: (1) covering of wax, (2) thick cuticle, (3) sub-epidermal protective tissue, (4) water tissue, (5) covering of hairs (6) covering of the stomata, (7) sinking of the stomata, (8) inclusion of the stomata in a space protected from air currents, (9) diminution of the evaporating surface, &c. The matter however is so complicated that it is very difficult to reach an exact appraisal of these adaptations in characterizing the individual plant communities biologically. ... In general we must content ourselves with showing the most frequently occurring adaptations, without going farther into the statistical investigation. ... A preliminary direct consideration of a series of evergreen phanerophytic communities, ... show that amongst the adaptations named, diminution of the transpiring surface, diminution in leaf size, is one of the adaptations generally in evidence; and since this adaptation is easy to observe and comparatively easy to measure, it is convenient to begin with it if we wish to use the statistical method on this domain.

Raunkiaer used the following size classes:

- Leptophyll: less than 25 square millimetres
- Nanophyll: 25–225 square millimetres
- Microphyll: 225-2,025 square millimetres
- Mesophyll: 2,025-18,225 square millimetres
- Macrophyll: 18,225-164,025 square millimetres
- Megaphyll: greater than 164,025 square millimetres

Later authors have modified the classes and have sometimes used leaf length as a simpler measure than leaf area if the leaf shape is approximately an ellipse. For example, L.J. Webb used size classes:

- Microphyll: less than 2,025 square millimetres
- Notophyll: 2,025–4,500 square millimetres
- Mesophyll: greater than 4,500 square millimetres

== Examples of definitions ==
Examples of definitions of the categories of leaf size
Classification	Raunkiaer quoted by Dash	Webb	Whitten et al	Ingrouille Converted to mm^{2} for ease of comparison	van der Maarel	Boland et al	Wet Tropics Mgmt Authority
Megaphyll	> 164,025 mm^{2}			> 164,000 mm^{2}	> 180,000 mm^{2}		
Macrophyll	18,225-164,025 mm^{2}			18,000-164,000 mm^{2}	36,400-180,000 mm^{2}		
Platyphyll					18,200-36,400 mm^{2}		
Mesophyll	2,025-18,225 mm^{2}	> 4,500 mm^{2}	4,500-18,225 mm^{2}	5,600-18,000 mm^{2}	4,500-18,200 mm^{2}	> 12.7 cm	> 12.5 cm
Notophyll		2,025–4,500 mm^{2}	2,025–4500 mm^{2}		2,025-4,500 mm^{2}	7.6-12.7 cm	7.5-12.5 cm
Micro-mesophyll				2,000-5,600 mm^{2}			
Microphyll	225-2,025 mm^{2}	< 2,025 mm^{2}	225-2,025 mm^{2}	1,200-2,000 mm^{2}	225-2,025 mm^{2}	2.5-7.6 cm	< 7.5 cm
Nano-microphyll				200-1,200 mm^{2}			
Nanophyll	25–225 mm^{2}		< 225 mm^{2}	25–200 mm^{2}	25–225 mm^{2}	< 2.5 cm	
Leptophyll	< 25 mm^{2}			10–25 mm^{2}	2–25 mm^{2}		
Subleptophyll				< 10 mm^{2}			
Picophyll					< 2 mm^{2}		

== Single vegetable organisms with large leaves ==
- Gunnera manicata, giant ornamental rhubarb; leaves 2 m × 3.4 m (6 ft 7 in × 11 ft 2 in);
- Raphia regalis, composed leaves 25.11 m × 3 m (82.4 ft × 9.8 ft);
- Manicaria saccifera, Amazonian palm; partially composed leaves 8 m (26 ft);
- Marojejya darianii, big-leaf palm; leaves 5 m (16 ft);
- Johannesteijsmannia altifrons, Joey palm; undivided leaves 4 m (13 ft) long;
- Amorphophallus titanum, titan arum; leaves area 3.2 m^{2} (34 sq ft);
- Victoria amazonica, giant Amazonian waterlily; aquatic plant with leaves 2.4 m (8 ft) long; leaves area 4.6 m^{2} (50 sq ft).

== See also ==
- Leaf
