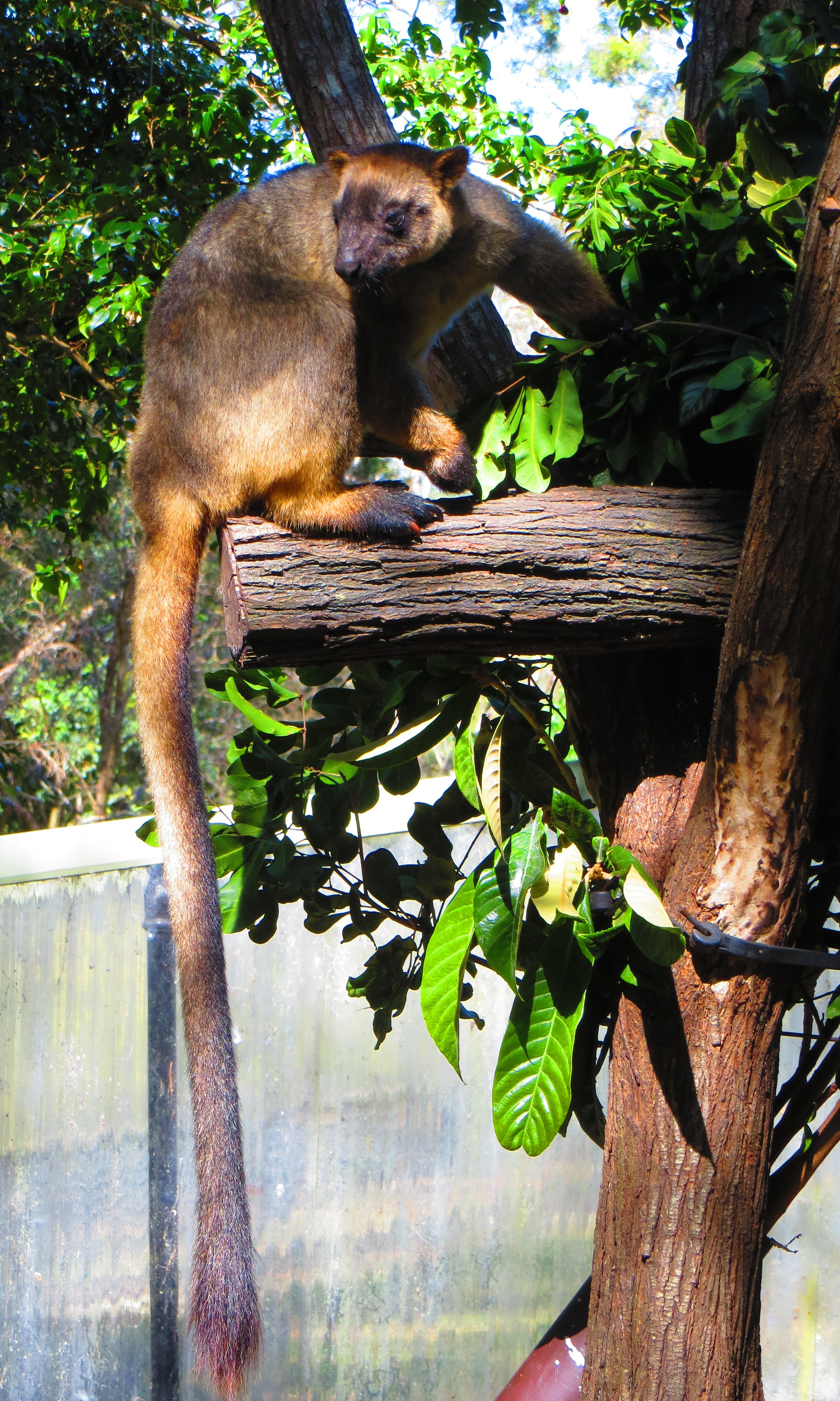
- Lumholtz's tree kangaroo (Dendrolagus lumholtzii) at David Fleay Wildlife Park, Burleigh Heads, Queensland

Conservation status
- Near Threatened (IUCN 3.1)

Scientific classification
- Kingdom: Animalia
- Phylum: Chordata
- Class: Mammalia
- Infraclass: Marsupialia
- Order: Diprotodontia
- Family: Macropodidae
- Genus: Dendrolagus
- Species: D. lumholtzi

Binomial name
- Dendrolagus lumholtzi Collett, 1884
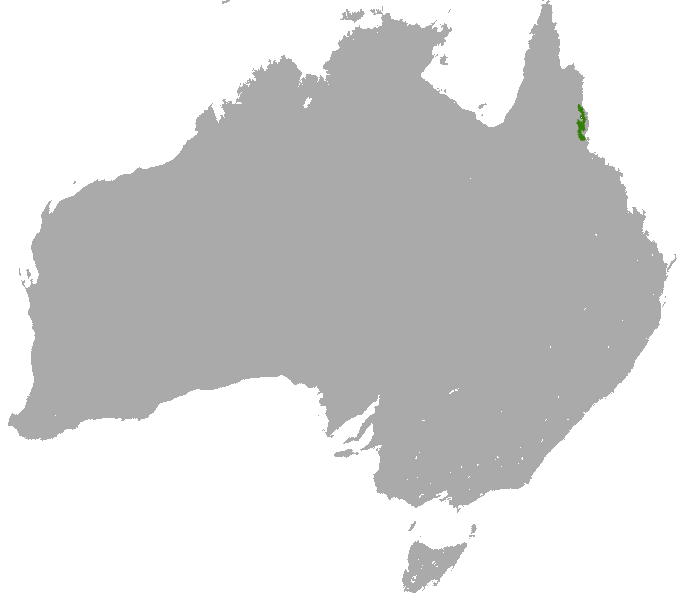
- Lumholtz's tree-kangaroo range

= Lumholtz's tree-kangaroo =

Species of marsupial

Lumholtz's tree-kangaroo (Dendrolagus lumholtzi) is a arboreal, long-tailed marsupial found in rainforests in northeastern Australia. Like most tree-kangaroos (genus Dendrolagus), it lives alone in trees and feeds on plant matter. It belongs to the macropod family (Macropodidae) with kangaroos, and carries its young in a pouch like other marsupials. It is threatened by climate change and diseases, and is found in the hilly, fertile Atherton Tableland near Cairns in north east Queensland.

== Name ==
The species name lumholtzi is after the Norwegian explorer Carl Sofus Lumholtz (1851–1922), who was the first European to record a specimen in 1883. The local indigenous Dyirbal and Yidiny language name may have been either "mabi" or "mapi".

== Description and habitat ==
It is the smallest of all tree-kangaroos, with males weighing an average of 7.2 kg (16 lbs) and females 5.9 kg (13 lbs). Its head and body length ranges 480–650 mm (19–26 in), and its tail, 600–740 mm (24–29 in). It has powerful limbs and has short, grizzled grey fur. Its muzzle, toes and tip of tail are black.

The Lumholtz's tree-kangaroos colonizes a variety of habitats, as long as they are flush with food and have stable and adaptable structural features.

== Social behaviour ==
Lumholtz's tree-kangaroo are generally solitary animals, with the exception of male–female mating and the long, intimate mother–joey relationship. Each kangaroo maintains a "home range" and will be hostile towards a member of the same sex that enters it (the one exception seems to be non-hostile encounters between adult males and their male offspring). Thus, the male will protect his own range, and visit the ranges of the females in his group. Mating takes place in episodes of about twenty minutes, and is often quite aggressive.

== Status ==
The Lumholtz's tree-kangaroo is classified as near-threatened by the IUCN, and authorities consider it as rare. It was historically impacted by habitat loss through logging and land clearing. Currently, it is threatened by non-native diseases and by climate change, which causes temperature extremes and severe weather.

== Blindness ==
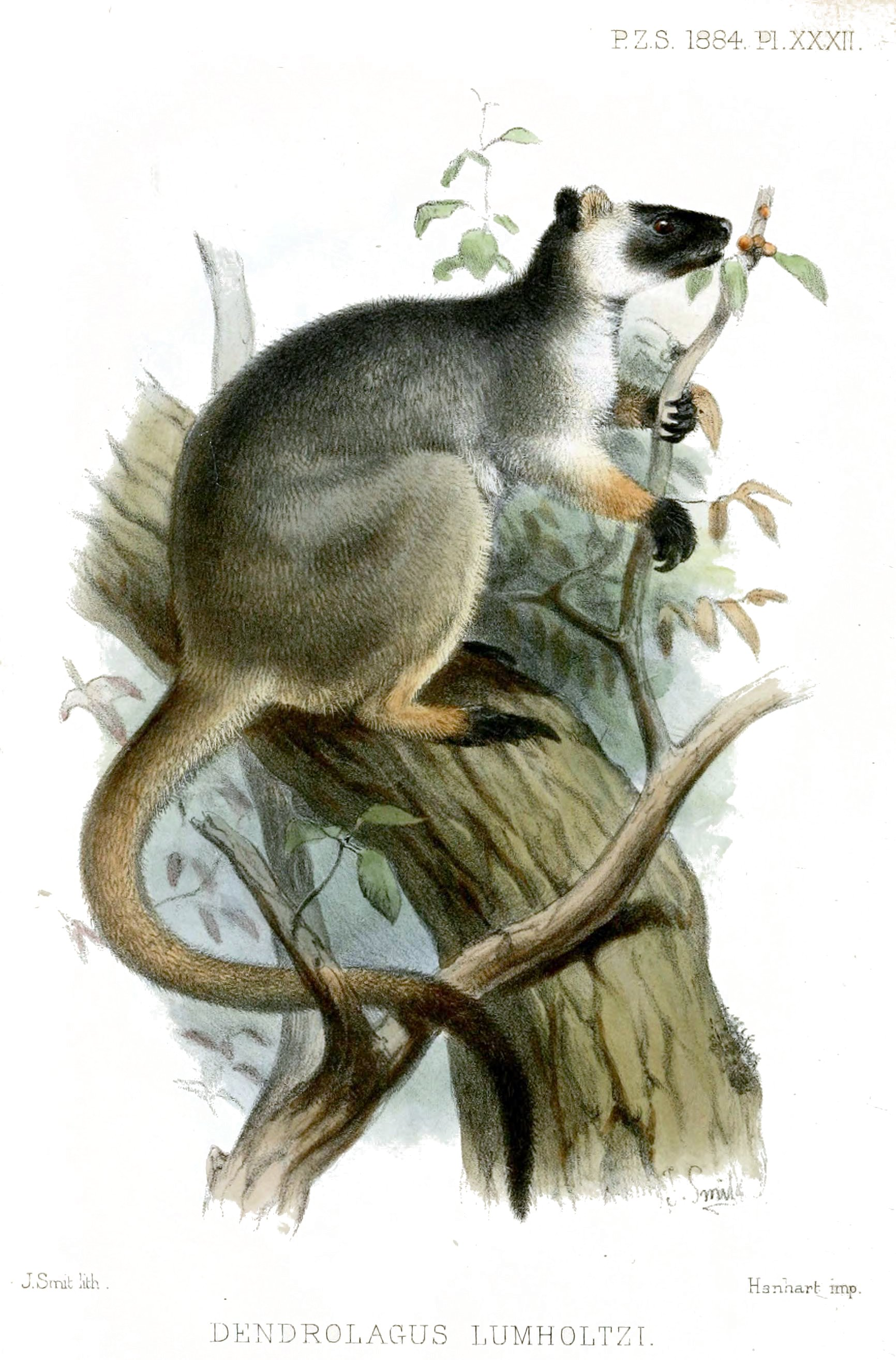
Lithograph of Dendrolagus lumholtzi by Joseph Smit, from Proceedings of the general meetings for scientific business of the Zoological Society of London, 1884

In June 2019, it was reported that many Lumholtz's tree-kangaroos were going blind. Normally almost invisible in the treetops, they were being found in schools, sheds and in the middle of roads, unable to see and confused. Veterinarian Andrew Peters, from Charles Sturt University, said he had found evidence of optic nerve and brain damage, suggesting that a new viral infection was involved.

Karen Coombes, who has cared for injured tree kangaroos on her property west of Cairns for two decades, said she thought successive dry periods in the area were contributing to the eye problems. Her theory was that, because the animals only eat the leaves of the rainforest trees they inhabit, which are always fairly toxic, the drier-than-normal weather over recent years could have caused the toxins in the leaves to become more concentrated. No toxin has been identified and the hypothesis remains speculative and unsubstantiated.

Work by wildlife veterinarian Amy Shima and wildlife biologist Roger Martin (author of Tree-kangaroos of Australia and New Guinea), did not support those claims. Their fieldwork, spanning five years, found no convincing evidence of widespread blindness in Lumholtz's tree-kangaroo. Working with a comparative veterinary ocular pathologist from a university in the United States, Shima looked at nearly 100 eyes from Lumholtz's tree-kangaroo carcasses (primarily road-killed animals) and found no evidence of widespread blindness or pathology. Those findings were recently presented in a poster presentation at the international Wildlife Disease Association conference.
