= Whitecar Coaches =

Areas serviced by Whitecars

The Whitecars Coaches company ran daily coach services between Cairns and the Atherton Tableland, Australia until December 2007 when it ceased operation.

== History ==
The inaugural trip of Cairns Tableland Motor Service Ltd was down the Gillies Highway on 10 June 1926, the day the Gillies Highway was officially opened, and the company was registered the day before – 9 June 1926. Whitecars became a hackneyed title for Cairns Tableland Motor Service Ltd as the first "buses" were Studebaker cars stretched to include an extra row of seats, and they were painted white for safety. The company was bought by other interests in 1947 and the founder purchased the company back in 1950 where it has remained in the family to this day, officially trading as Whitecar Coaches Pty Ltd.

== Services ==
These services are now operated by Trans North Bus & Coach

- Cairns – Kuranda – Mareeba – Atherton – Herberton – Ravenshoe
- Ravenshoe – Herberton – Atherton – Mareeba – Cairns
- Cairns – Kuranda
- Kuranda – Cairns
