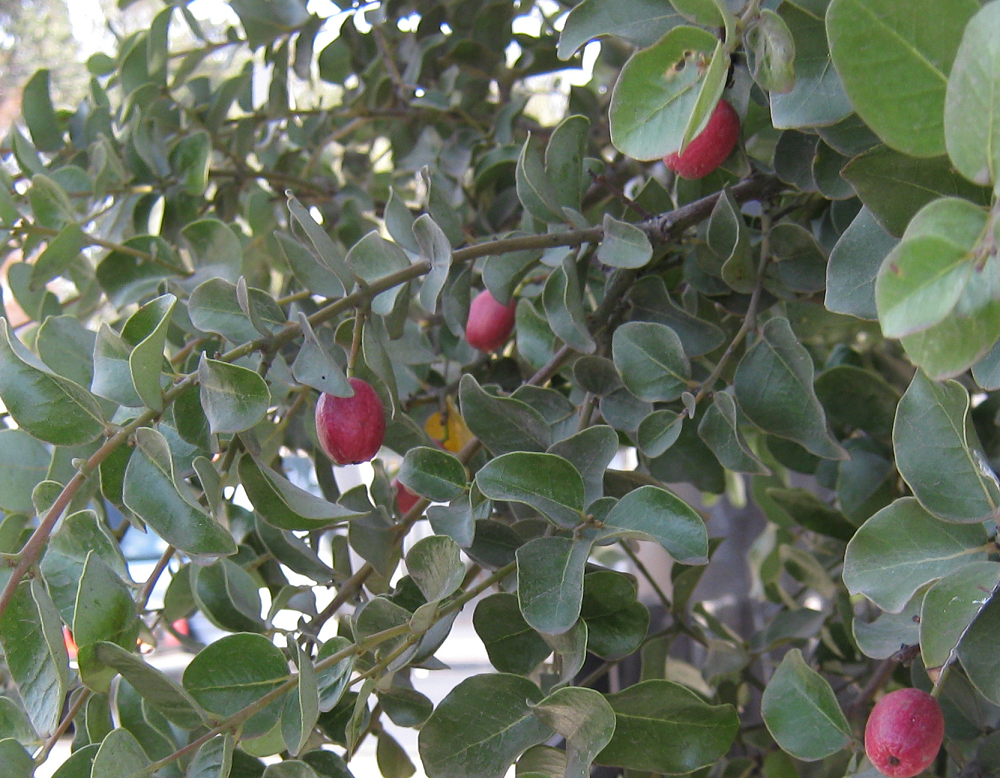
- Cryptocarya alba

Scientific classification
- Kingdom: Plantae
- Clade: Tracheophytes
- Clade: Angiosperms
- Clade: Magnoliids
- Order: Laurales
- Family: Lauraceae
- Genus: Cryptocarya; R.Br.

Species
- Over 360; See List of Cryptocarya species

Synonyms
- Agathophyllum Juss.; Caryodaphne Blume ex Nees; Dahlgrenodendron J.J.M.van der Merwe & A.E.van Wyk; Evodia Gaertn.; Icosandra Phil.; Kerrdora Gagnep.; Massoia Becc.; Pseudocryptocarya Teschner; Ravensara Sonn.; Salgada Blanco

= Cryptocarya =

Genus of flowering plants

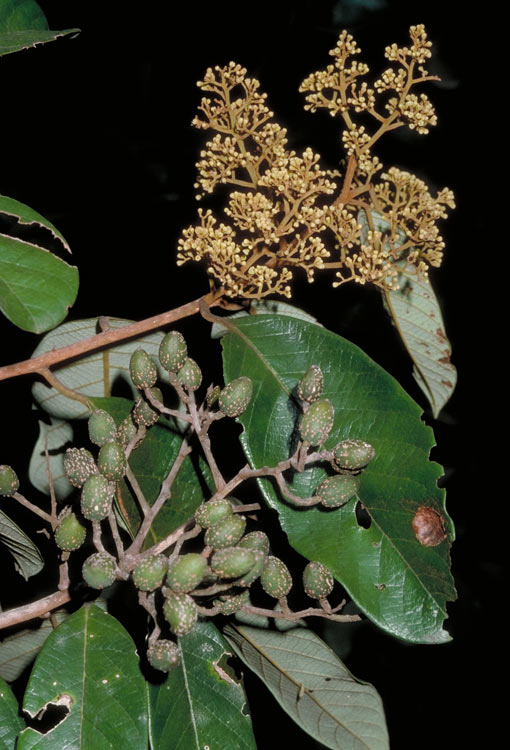
Cryptocarya mackinnoniana

Cryptocarya is a genus of about 360 species of flowering plants in the laurel family, Lauraceae. Most species are trees, occasionally shrubs, distributed through the Neotropical, Afrotropical, Indomalayan, and Australasian realms. Most plants in the genus Cryptocarya have leaves arranged alternately along the stems, small flowers with 6 tepals, stamens in 2 rows, the inner row alternating with staminodes, and the fruit is a drupe.

== Description ==
Plants in the genus Cryptocarya are trees, occasionally shrubs, the leaves usually arranged alternately along the branches. The leaves are petiolate and pinnately-veined. The flowers are arranged in cymes, racemes or panicles in leaf axils usually at the ends of branches and often appearing as if on the ends of the branches. The flowers have both male and female parts, with 6 tepals usually erect as the flower opens, and 9 stamens in 2 rows, the inner row of 3 alternating with staminodes. The ovary is sessile, usually with an inconspicuous stigma and the fruit is an elliptic to spherical, fleshy drupe, containing a single seed.

== Taxonomy ==
The genus Cryptocarya was first formally described in 1810 by Robert Brown in his Prodromus Florae Novae Hollandiae et Insulae Van Diemen. The genus name Cryptocarya means 'hidden nut', referring to the fruit that is hidden by the tepals.

In a recent generic classification of Lauraceae based on DNA sequence, Cryptocarya was found to be part of a strongly supported clade that also includes Beilschmiedia, Potameia, and Endiandra.

=== Species list ===
See List of Cryptocarya species.

== Distribution ==
Species of Cryptocarya are found in some parts of South America, southern Africa, Madagascar, South Asia, Southeast Asia, Japan, New Guinea and Australia.

== Uses ==
The leaves of C. woodii have been found in prehistoric settlements in Africa and are believed to have been used for insect control.

Essential oil is commercially harvested from Cryptocarya agathophylla (formerly Ravensara aromatica), a tree native to the lowland rainforests of eastern Madagascar. Known as ravensara oil, it is used for aromatherapy in Europe and America.
