= Palaquium ravii =

Conservation status
- Endangered (IUCN 2.3)

Scientific classification
- Kingdom: Plantae
- Clade: Tracheophytes
- Clade: Angiosperms
- Clade: Eudicots
- Clade: Asterids
- Order: Ericales
- Family: Sapotaceae
- Genus: Palaquium
- Species: P. ravii

Binomial name
- Palaquium ravii Sasidh. & Vink

Species of flowering plant

Palaquium ravii is a species of tree in the family Sapotaceae. It is endemic to the Western Ghats mountains and native to Kerala and Tamil Nadu in India.

== Description ==
This species occurs as evergreen trees that can grow up to 20 to 37 meters tall. The trees have straight, smooth grey bark or greyish-red trunks, with a reddish blaze and profuse white latex. Mature trees have a columnar appearance as the branches spread out at a significant height. The young branchlets are cylindrical with appressed small hairs, but become hairless when mature. The leaves are simple and alternate, spirally arranged, and distinctly clustered towards the ends of the twigs. They are thick (coriaceous), hairless (glabrous), with entire margins and turn brown when dry. They have small stipules that fall off, leaving a visible scar. The leaf petiole is about 1.5 to 2.5 cm long and has small hairs when young, but is hairless in mature leaves. The leaf blade measures 8 to 17 cm in length and 3.5 to 6.2 cm in width, with a distinctly obovate to oblanceolate shape. It has an attenuate base and an apex that is obtuse or rounded, or abruptly acuminate with a blunt tip. The venation includes 5 to 8 pairs of secondary nerves and broadly reticulate tertiary veins. The flowers are creamy white, either solitary in older branches or arranged in axillary clusters of 2 to 8 flowers, each with a pedicel up to 1 cm long. The fruit is a berry, with a spherical or obovoid shape, about 2 cm in length. The calyx lobes are persistent on the fruit, which has a grainy, rough light brown surface. The fruits have 1, or rarely 2, seeds, that are shiny, brown.

== Taxonomy ==
The species was described by N. Sasidharan and W. Vink and named after N. Ravi, Professor of Botany, in Sree Narayana College, Quilon. It differs from 11 other species in the same genus found in India and Sri Lanka is some key characters. It lacks an acumen at the leaf tip unlike Palaquium bourdillonii, P. canaliculatum, P. ellipticum, P. laevifolium, P. pauciflorum, P. petiolare, P. polyanthum, and P. thwaitesii. It has smaller leaves and fewer lateral nerves than P. grande and P. obovatum and a much shorter fruit stalk than in P. rubiginosum. The obovoid berry and leaf shape is somewhat similar to P. obovatum, but the latter lacks the arcuate connections between the secondary nerves and has its tertiary nerves transverse.

== Common names ==
The species is called Choppala, Pachendi, Pali in Malayalam. The Kadar name for it is Chora Pali.

== Distribution and status ==
The species is endemic to the Anamalai Hills of the southern Western Ghats mountain ranges in India. It is listed as Endangered in the IUCN Red List of Threatened Species.

== Ecology ==
The species occurs in medium-elevation tropical wet evergreen forests of the Western Ghats. It was reported to occur between 700 and 800 m elevation, but recent surveys have recorded the species between 670 and 100 m above sea level in the Anamalai Hills. The trees flower between April and June and fruits are seen between May and September.

== Gallery ==
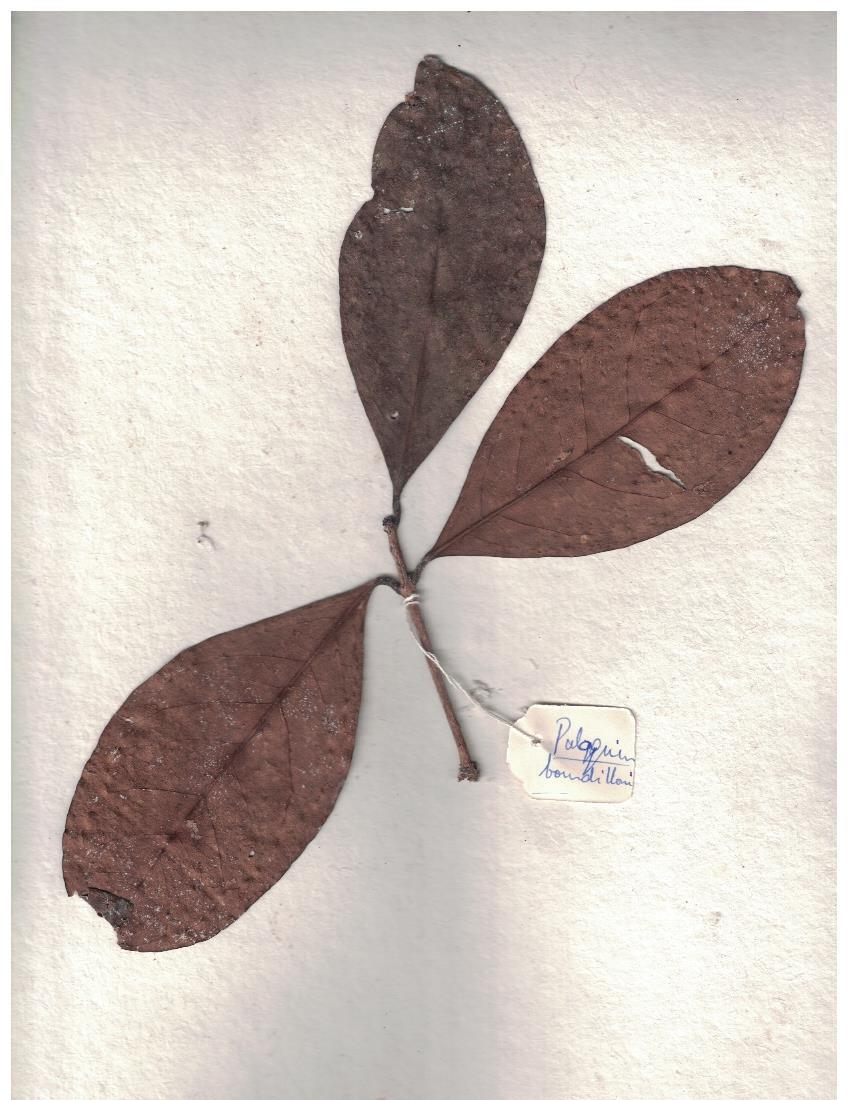
Herbarium specimen from the Anamalai Hills

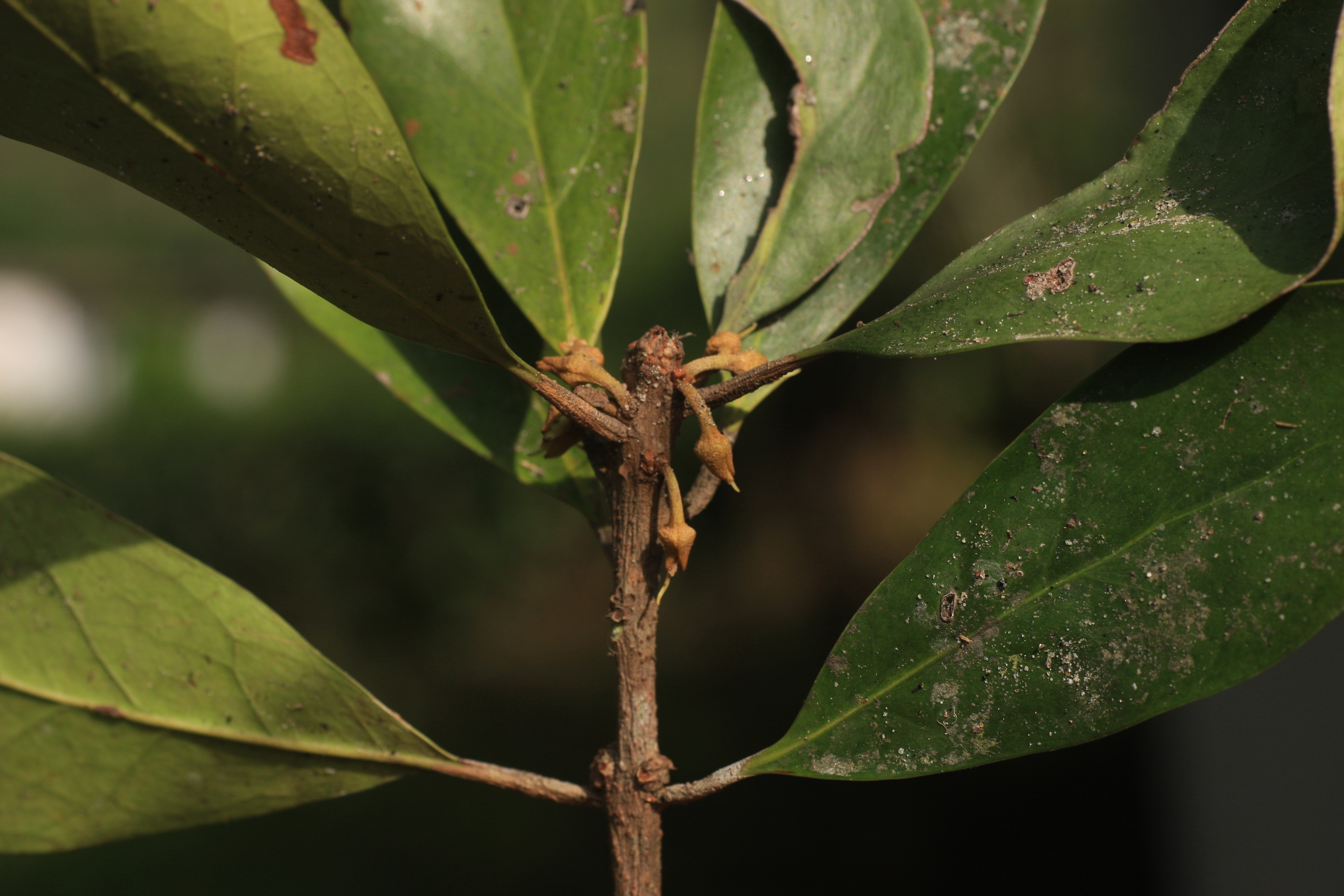
Leaves clustered at tip of branchlets

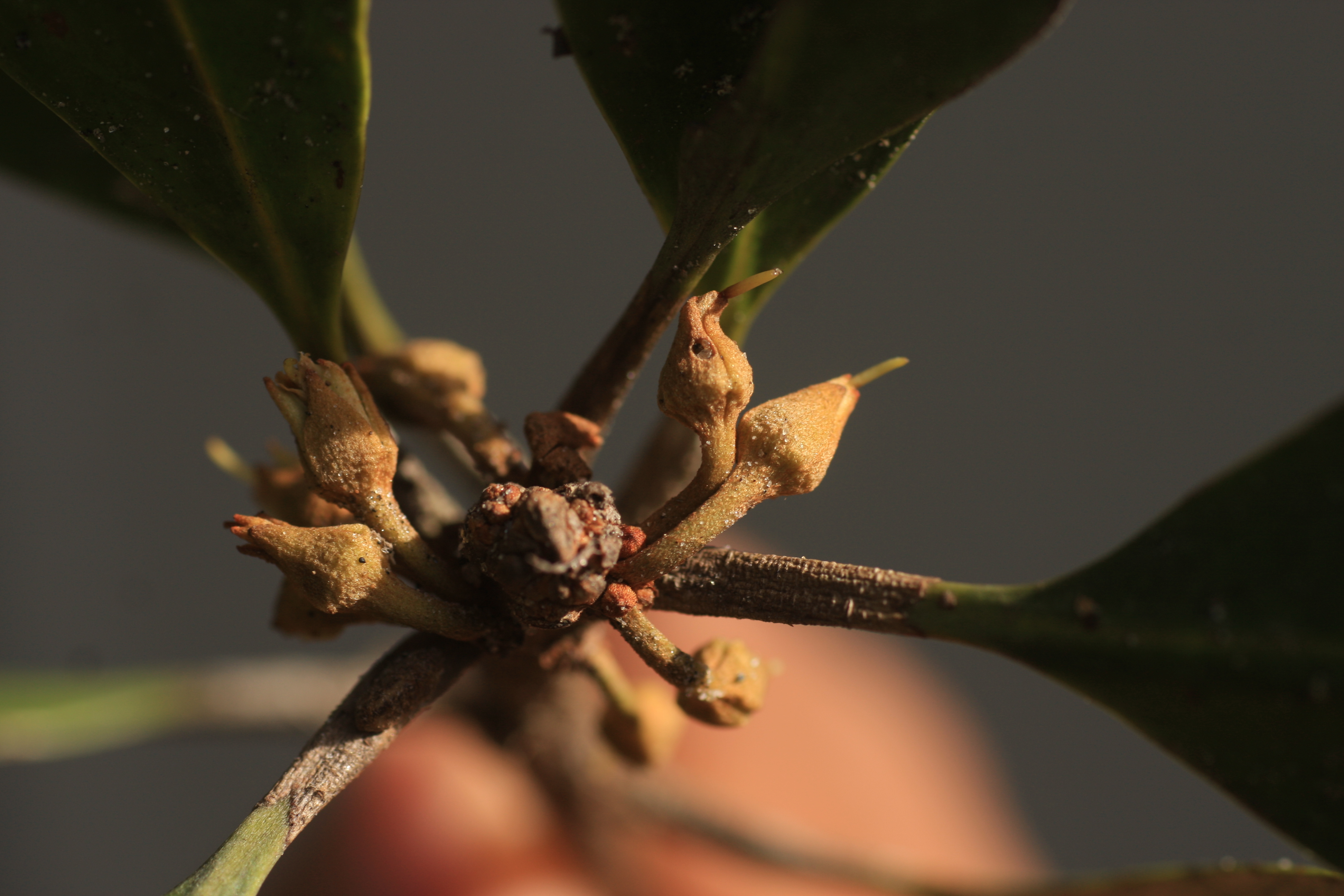
Attachment of flowers

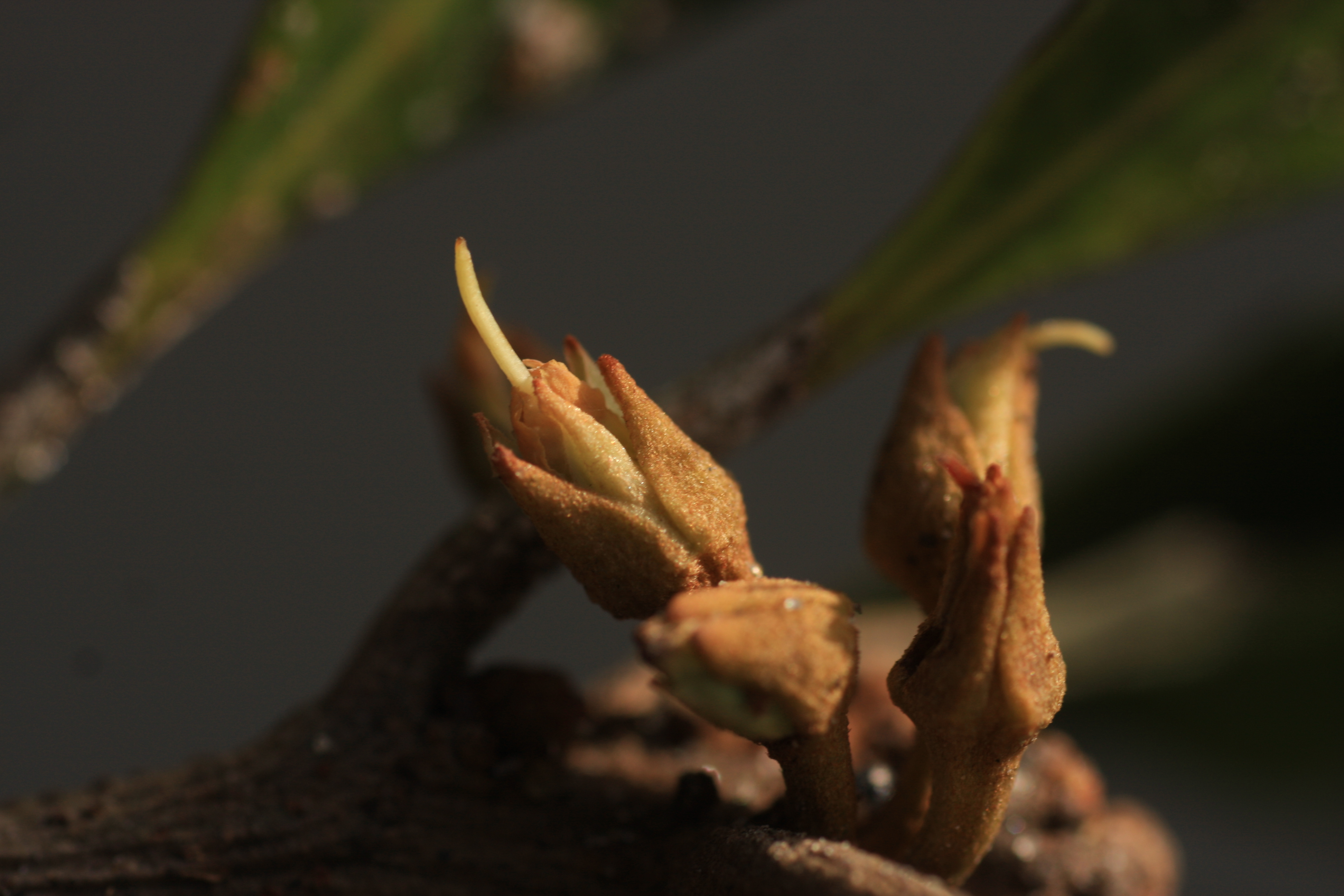
Close up of flower

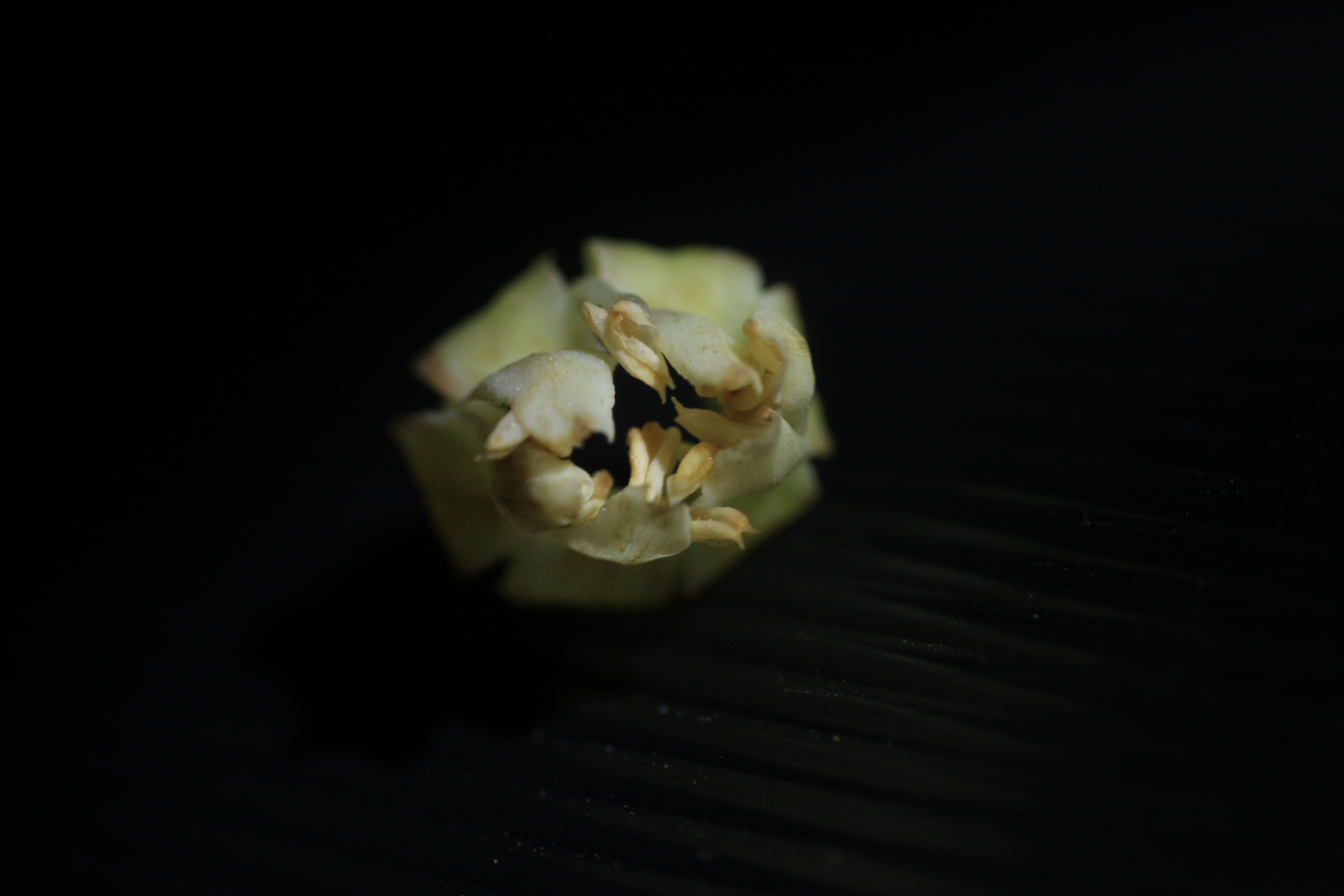
Single flower

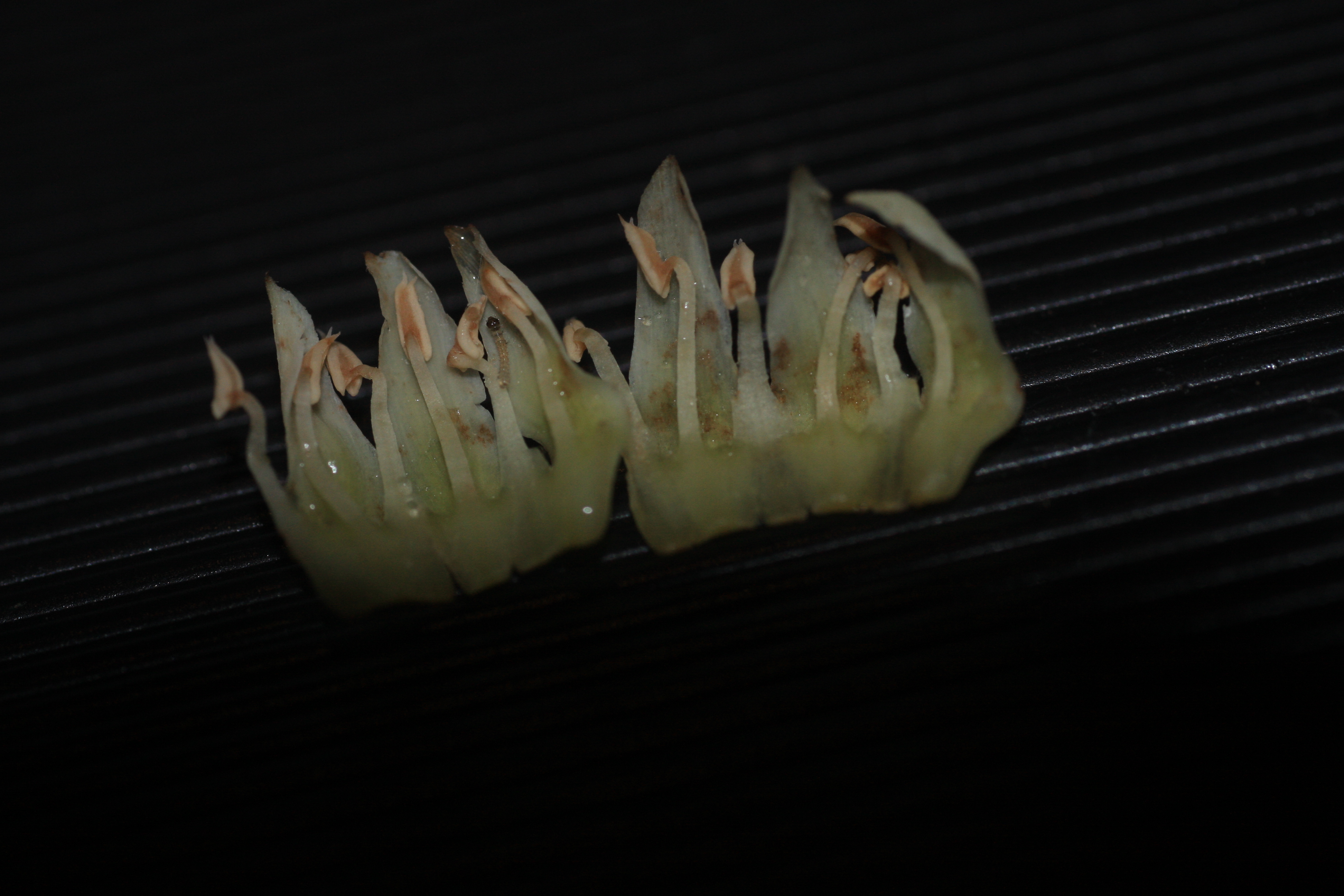
Flower cut open

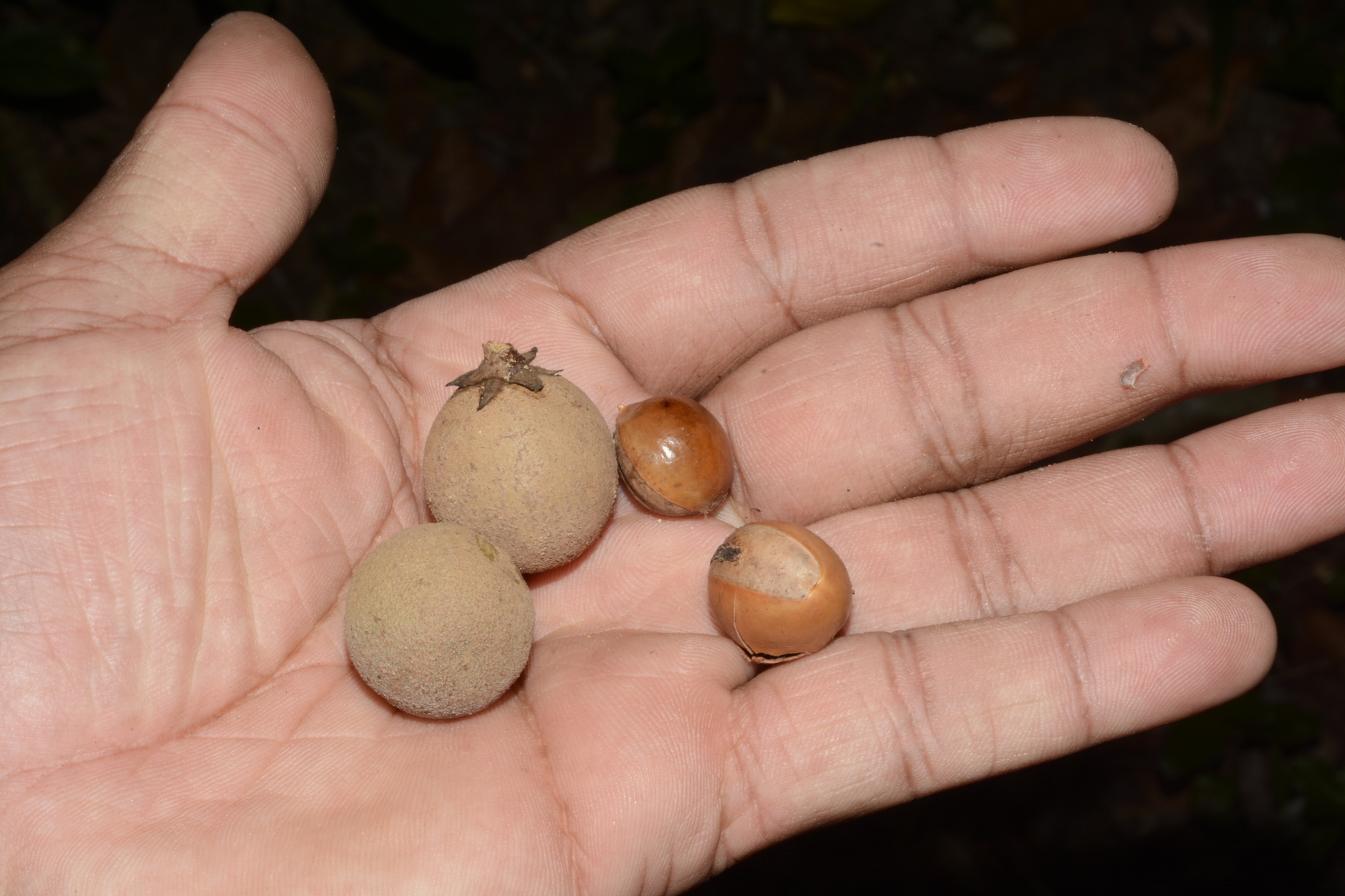
Fruits and seeds

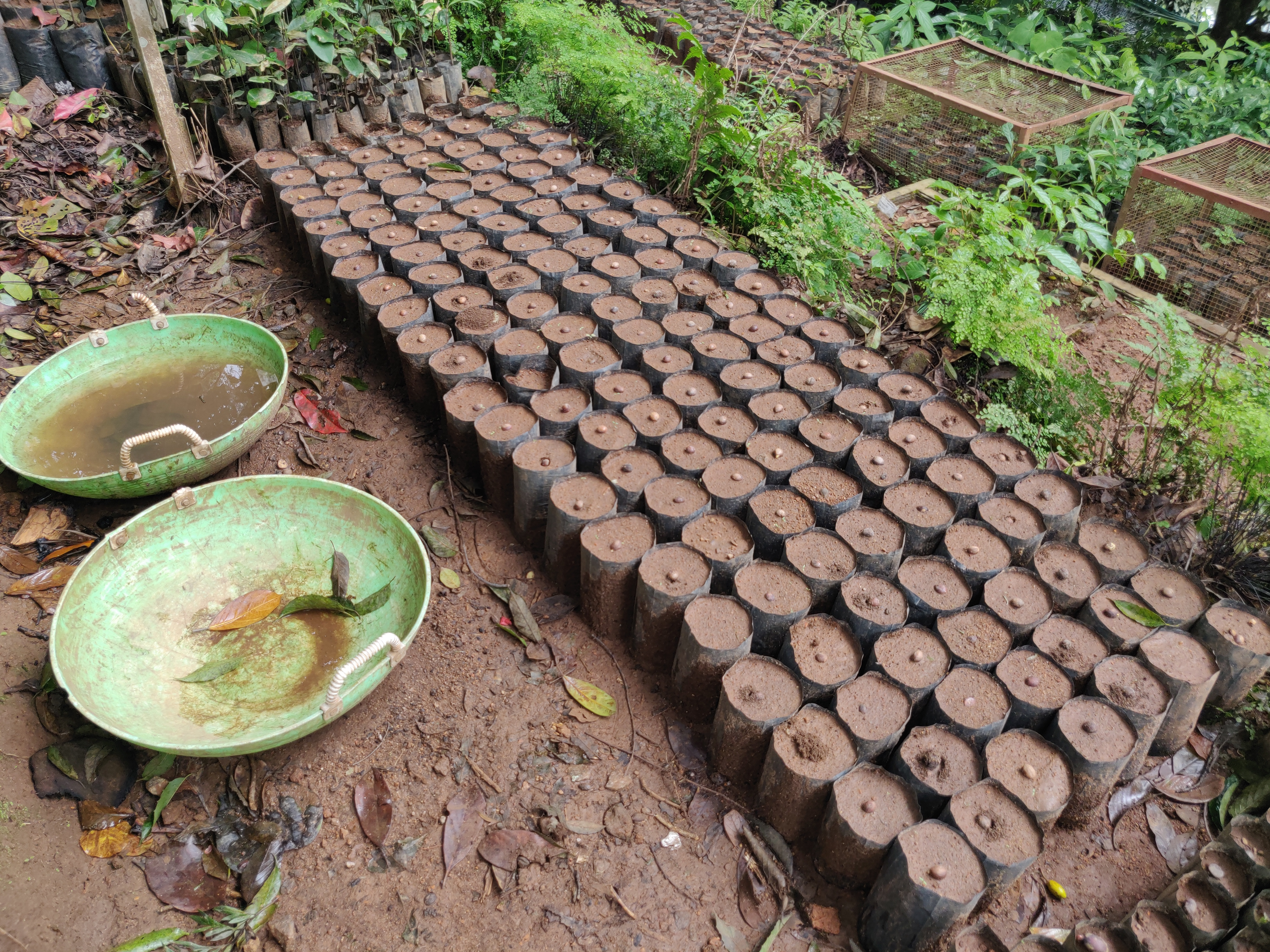
Seeds planted in polybags in rainforest nursery

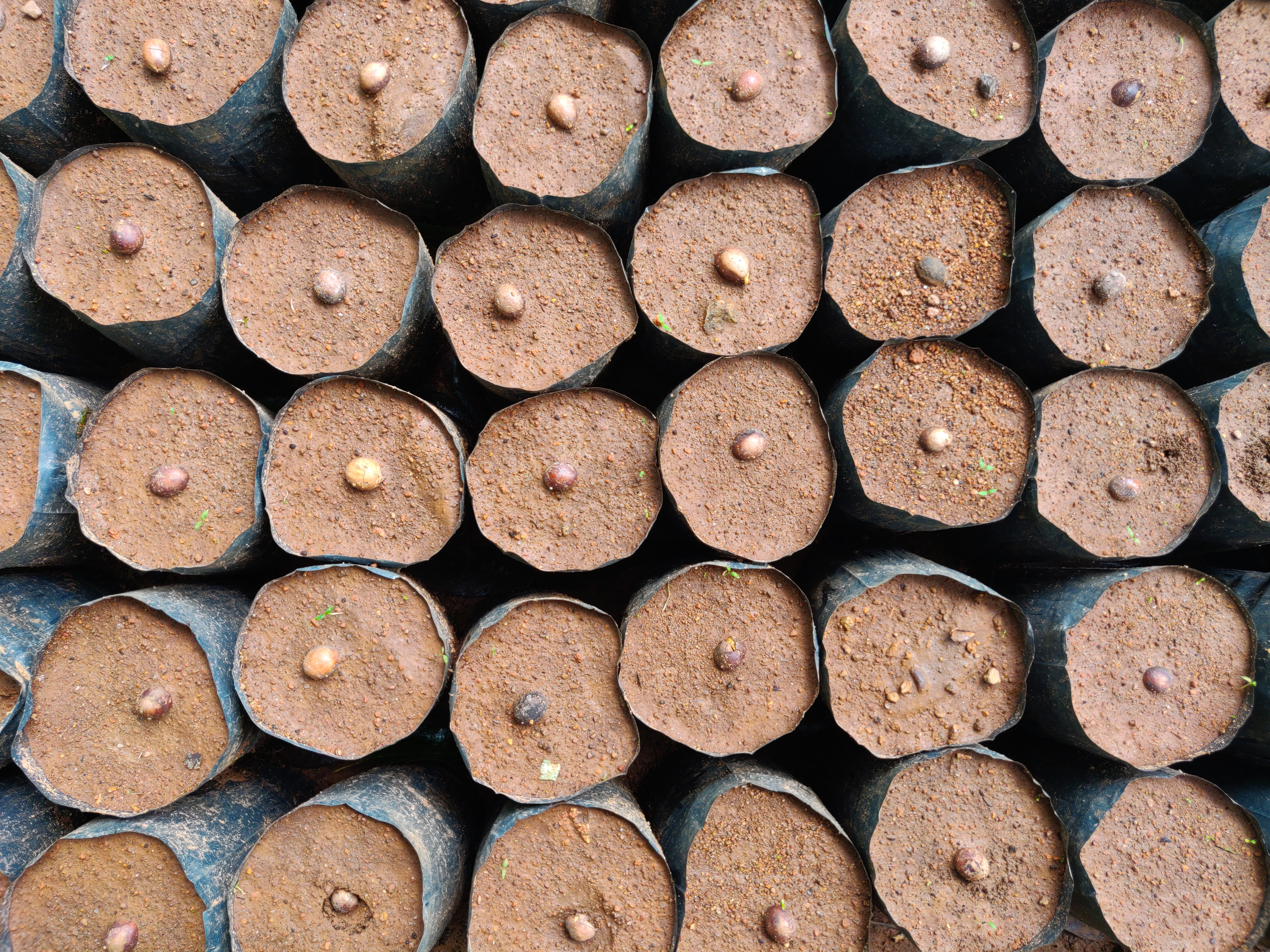
Close-up of seeds in polybags

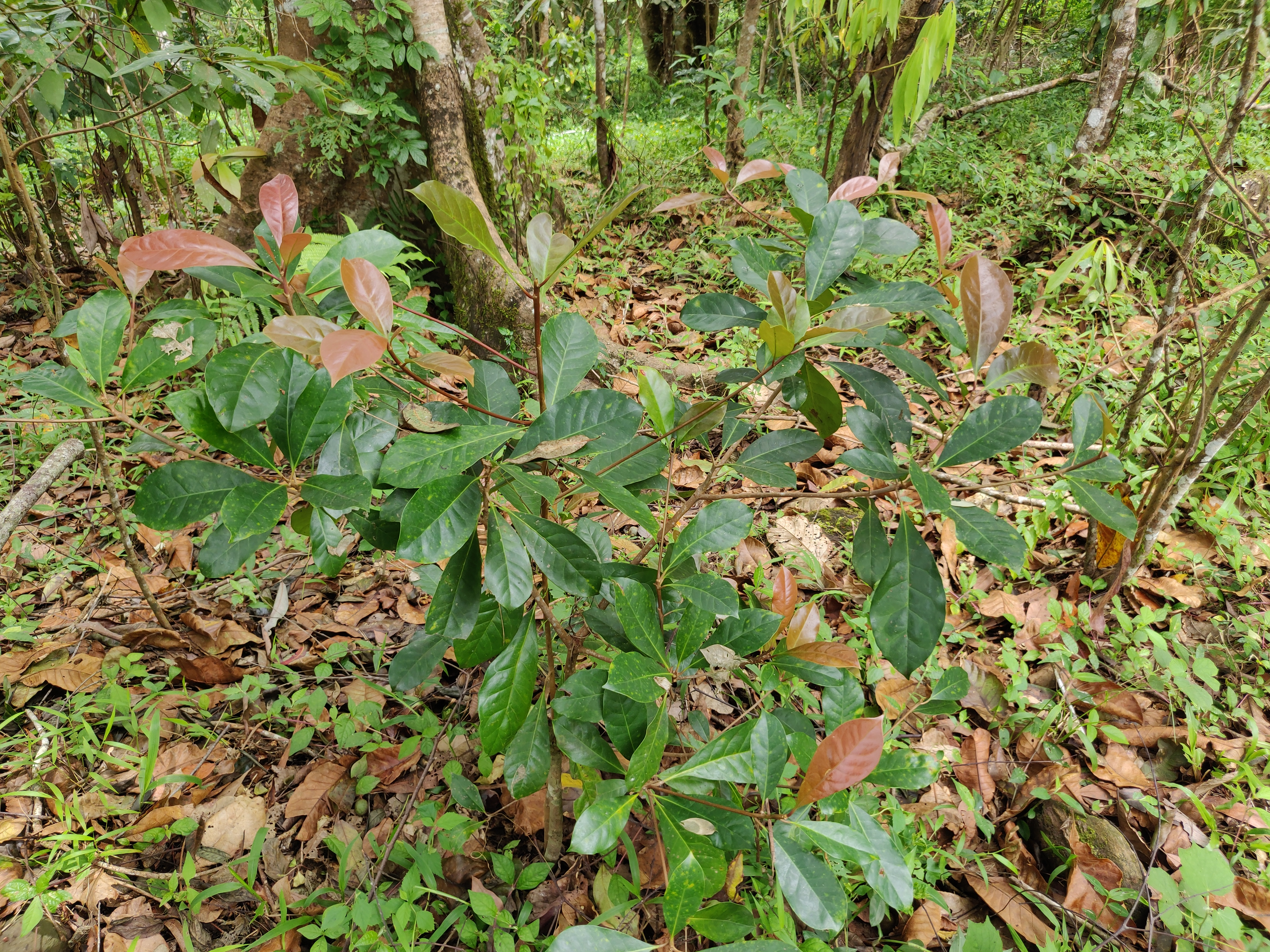
Sapling growing in rainforest restoration site
