= Beccarii =

Beccarii, a specific epithet honouring Italian botanist Odoardo Beccari, may refer to:

== Plants ==
- Aglaia beccarii, a tree in the family Meliaceae
- Bulbophyllum beccarii, an orchid in the family Orchidaceae
- Dacrydium beccarii, a conifer in the family Podocarpaceae
- Dryobalanops beccarii or Kapur Keladan, a tree in the family Dipterocarpaceae
- Haplolobus beccarii, a plant in the family Burseraceae
- Holochlamys beccarii, a plant in the family Araceae
- Musa beccarii, a wild banana in the family Musaceae
- Myrmecodia beccarii, a plant in the family Rubiaceae
- Palaquium beccarianum, a tree in the family Sapotaceae
- Palaquium beccarii, a tree in the family Sapotaceae

== Animals ==
- Acanthopelma beccarii, a tarantula
- Clinidium beccarii, a ground beetle in the family Carabidae
- Cochoa beccarii, a bird in the family Turdidae
- Conraua beccarii, a frog in the family Ranidae
- Crocidura beccarii, a shrew in the family Soricidae
- Emballonura beccarii, a bat in the family Emballonuridae
- Gallicolumba beccarii, a bird in the family Columbidae
- Margaretamys beccarii, a rat in the family Muridae
- Mormopterus beccarii, a bat in the family Molossidae
- Otus beccarii, an owl in the family Strigidae
- Scopula beccarii, a moth in the family Geometridae
- Sericornis beccarii, a bird in the family Acanthizidae
- Varanus beccarii, a monitor lizard in the family Varanidae
