= Palaquium hinmolpedda =

Conservation status
- Near Threatened (IUCN 3.1)

Scientific classification
- Kingdom: Plantae
- Clade: Tracheophytes
- Clade: Angiosperms
- Clade: Eudicots
- Clade: Asterids
- Order: Ericales
- Family: Sapotaceae
- Genus: Palaquium
- Species: P. hinmolpedda

Binomial name
- Palaquium hinmolpedda P.Royen

Species of tree

Palaquium hinmolpedda is a tree in the family Sapotaceae. The specific epithet hinmolpedda is from a Sinhalese name for the species.

== Description ==
Palaquium hinmolpedda grows up to 20 metres (70 ft) tall. The bark is smooth.

== Distribution and habitat ==
Palaquium hinmolpedda is endemic to Sri Lanka. Its habitat is tropical forests, at altitudes to around 300 m (1,000 ft).

== Conservation ==
Palaquium hinmolpedda has been assessed as Near Threatened on the IUCN Red List. The species is threatened by logging and harvesting. Some protection is afforded by the species' presence in protected areas including Kanneliya Forest Reserve.
