= Palaquium cochleariifolium =

Conservation status
- Least Concern (IUCN 3.1)

Scientific classification
- Kingdom: Plantae
- Clade: Embryophytes
- Clade: Tracheophytes
- Clade: Angiosperms
- Clade: Eudicots
- Clade: Asterids
- Order: Ericales
- Family: Sapotaceae
- Genus: Palaquium
- Species: P. cochleariifolium

Binomial name
- Palaquium cochleariifolium P.Royen

Species of flowering plant

Palaquium cochleariifolium is a tree in the family Sapotaceae. The specific epithet cochleariifolium means 'spoon-shaped leaves'.

== Description ==
Palaquium cochleariifolium grows up to 30 m (100 ft) tall, with a trunk diameter of up to 45 cm (18 in). The bark is dark brown. The inflorescences bear up to 14 flowers. The fruits are ellipsoid, up to 2.5 cm (1 in) long.

== Distribution and habitat ==
Palaquium cochleariifolium is endemic to Borneo. Its habitat is in swamps and kerangas forests.
