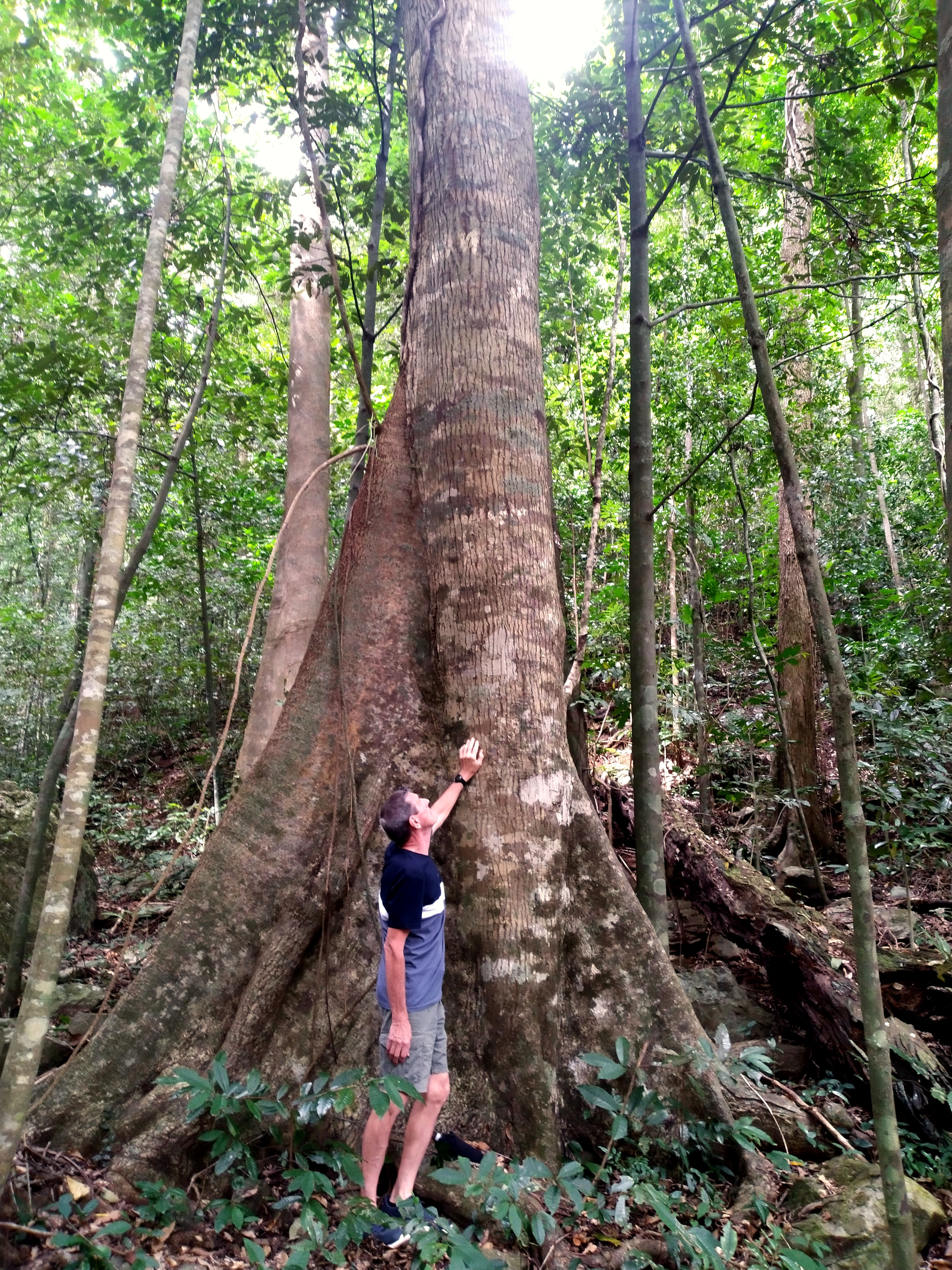
- Tree with 4 m buttress roots Barron Gorge, Queensland; August 2022

Conservation status
- Least Concern (IUCN 3.1)
- Least Concern (NCA)

Scientific classification
- Kingdom: Plantae
- Clade: Tracheophytes
- Clade: Angiosperms
- Clade: Eudicots
- Clade: Asterids
- Order: Ericales
- Family: Sapotaceae
- Genus: Palaquium
- Species: P. galactoxylum

Binomial name
- Palaquium galactoxylum (F.Muell.) H.J.Lam

Synonyms
- Bassia galactoxyla F.Muell.; Galactoxylon pierrei Baill.; Lucuma galactoxyla (F.Muell.) F.M.Bailey; Palaquium galactoxylum var. salomonense (C.T.White) P.Royen; Palaquium salomonense C.T.White; Sersalisia galactoxylon (F.Muell.) F.Muell. ex Benth.

= Palaquium galactoxylum =

Cairns pencil cedar

Species of tree

Palaquium galactoxylum, commonly known as Cairns pencil cedar, Daintree maple or red silkwood, is a species of plants in the star apple family Sapotaceae which is endemic to rainforests of New Guinea and northern Australia. It can produce spectacularly large buttress roots.

== Description ==
Palaquium galactoxylum is a rainforest tree growing up to 40 metres (130 ft) high, thus becoming an emegent within the forest ecosystem. It has a very straight cylindrical trunk marked with conspicuous vertical lines of lenticels, usually reaching a diameter of 1 m (3 ft 3 in), but it can grow to 2 m (6 ft 7 in). It often produces very large buttress roots up to 2 m (6 ft 7 in) high according to official documentation, but specimens have been sighted with much larger buttresses. The trunk, branches and leaves all exude a milky sap when cut. It is semi-deciduous, dropping its leaves for a short period around October.

The leaf-bearing twigs are scarred and rough looking; young twigs and new shoots are clothed in fine brown hairs. Leaves are glabrous and clustered towards the end of the twigs. They are rounded at the tip and cuneate at the base, and measure up to 13 cm (5.1 in) long by 5 cm (2.0 in) wide. The short petiole is about 13 mm (0.51 in) long.

The inflorescences are axillary, produced on the leaf-bearing twigs below the leaves. The fruits are a creamy-white ellipsoid (i.e.like a rugby ball) drupe about 40 mm (1.6 in) long by 20 mm (0.79 in) wide. They contain one or sometimes two seeds measuring up to 25 by 20 mm (1.0 by 0.8 in).

== Taxonomy ==
The taxonomy of this species has a somewhat convoluted history with a number of authors describing it and assigning various names. The name currently accepted by most authorities is Palaquium galactoxylum (F.Muell.) H.J.Lam, with combinations by Henri Ernest Baillon, Cyril Tenison White, Pieter van Royen, George Bentham, and even a second description published by Ferdinand von Mueller all being discarded.

In Australian botany, the species' accepted name is Palaquium galactoxylon.

=== Subspecies ===
As of April 2025, the subspecies Palaquium galactoxylum var salmonense (C.T.White) P.Royen is accepted by the Papua New Guinea National Herbarium and World Flora Online, but is not accepted by Plants of the World Online, the Global Biodiversity Information Facility or Catalogue of Life, who all consider it to be a synonym of the parent species.

=== Etymology ===
The genus name Palaquium comes from the Philippine word palakihun meaning "to let grow". The species epithet is from Ancient Greek galacto- (milky), and -xylon (wood, timber), referring to the copious white sap the plant produces.

== Distribution and habitat ==
Palaquium galactoxylum grows in tropical low-altitude rainforests of New Guinea (including the Bismarck Archipelago), the Solomon Islands, and Queensland, at elevations to around 300 m (1,000 ft).

== Ecology ==
Fruits of this species are eaten by cassowaries and fruit doves, including the Torresian imperial pigeon.

== Conservation ==
P. galactoxylum has no immediate threats, being relatively common and having a broad distribution. It is therefore listed as least concern by both the IUCN and the Queensland Department of Environment and Science.

== Uses ==
This tree produces a useful hardwood timber which is sold as "Pencil Cedar".

== Gallery ==
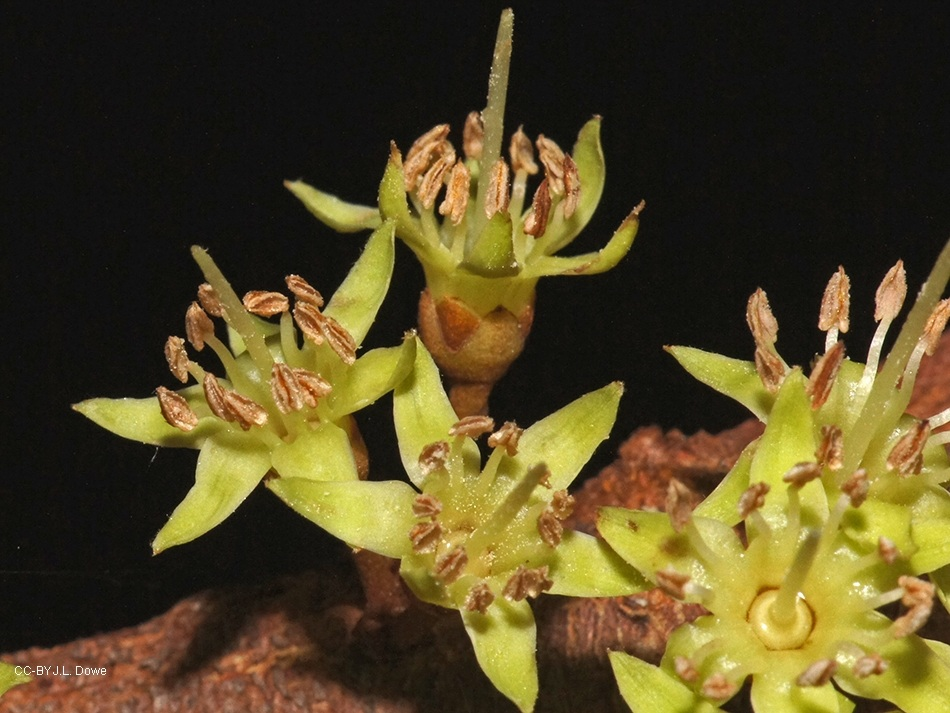
Flowers

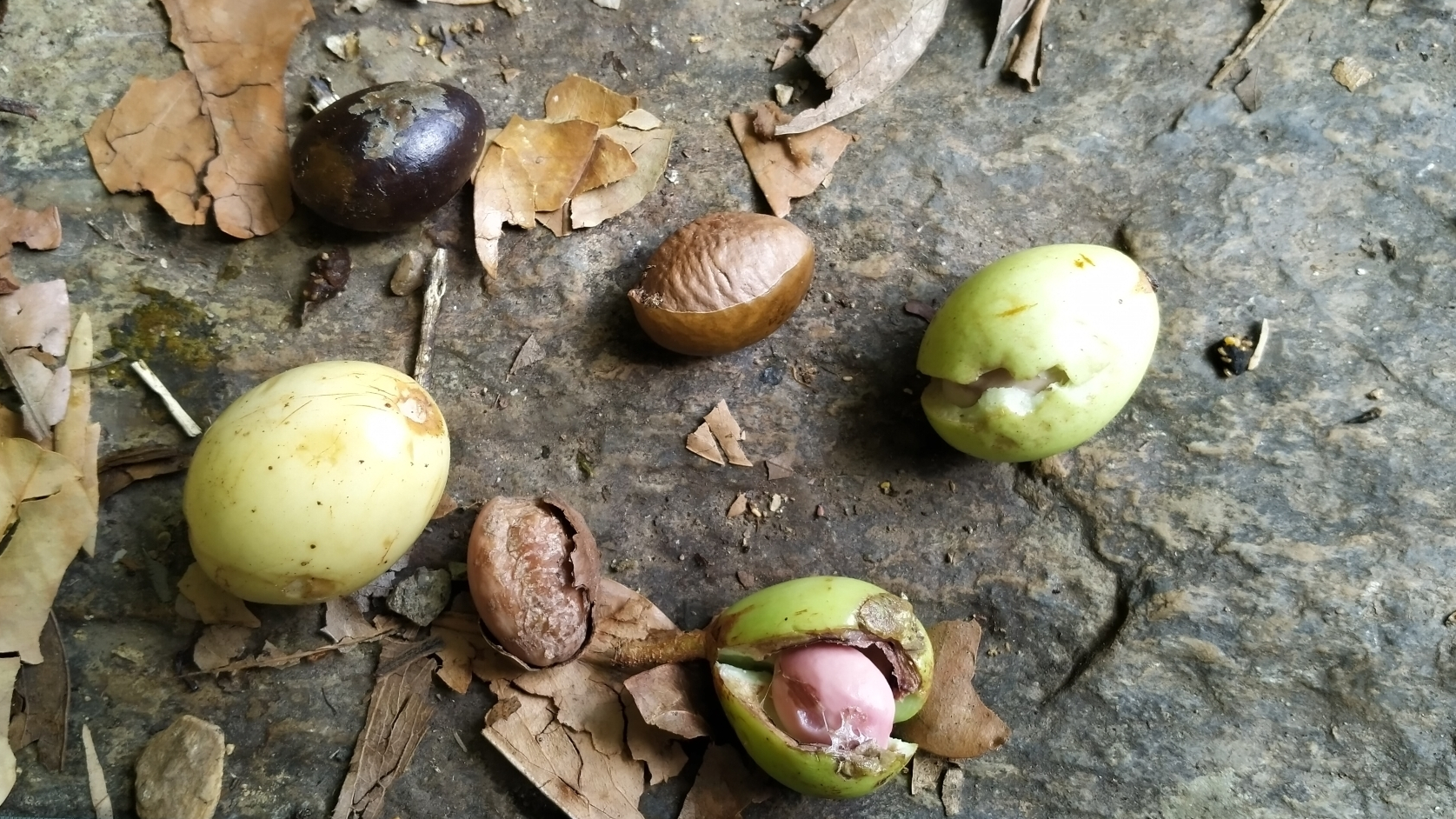
Fruits and seed

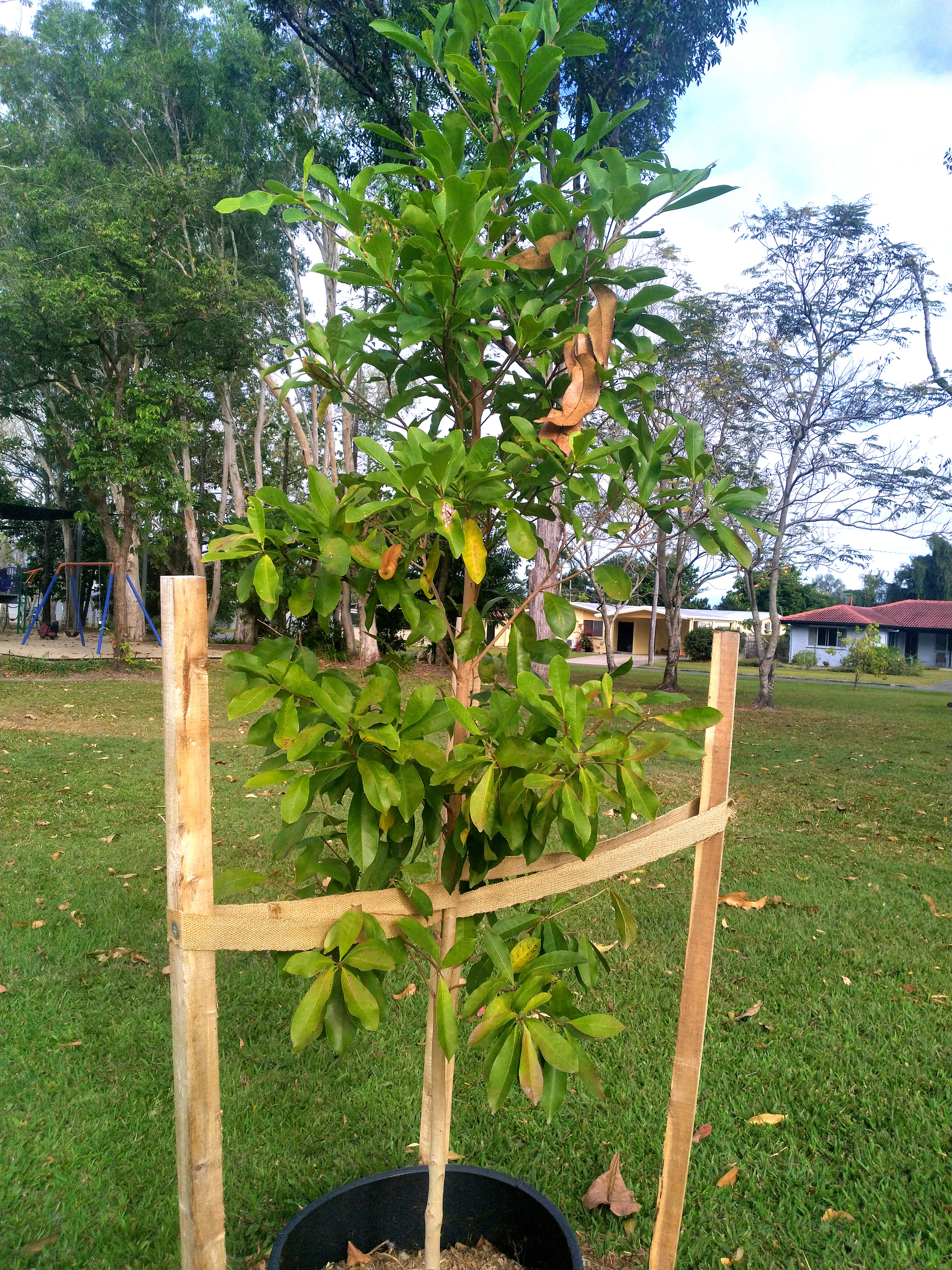
Sapling planted in a park in Cairns

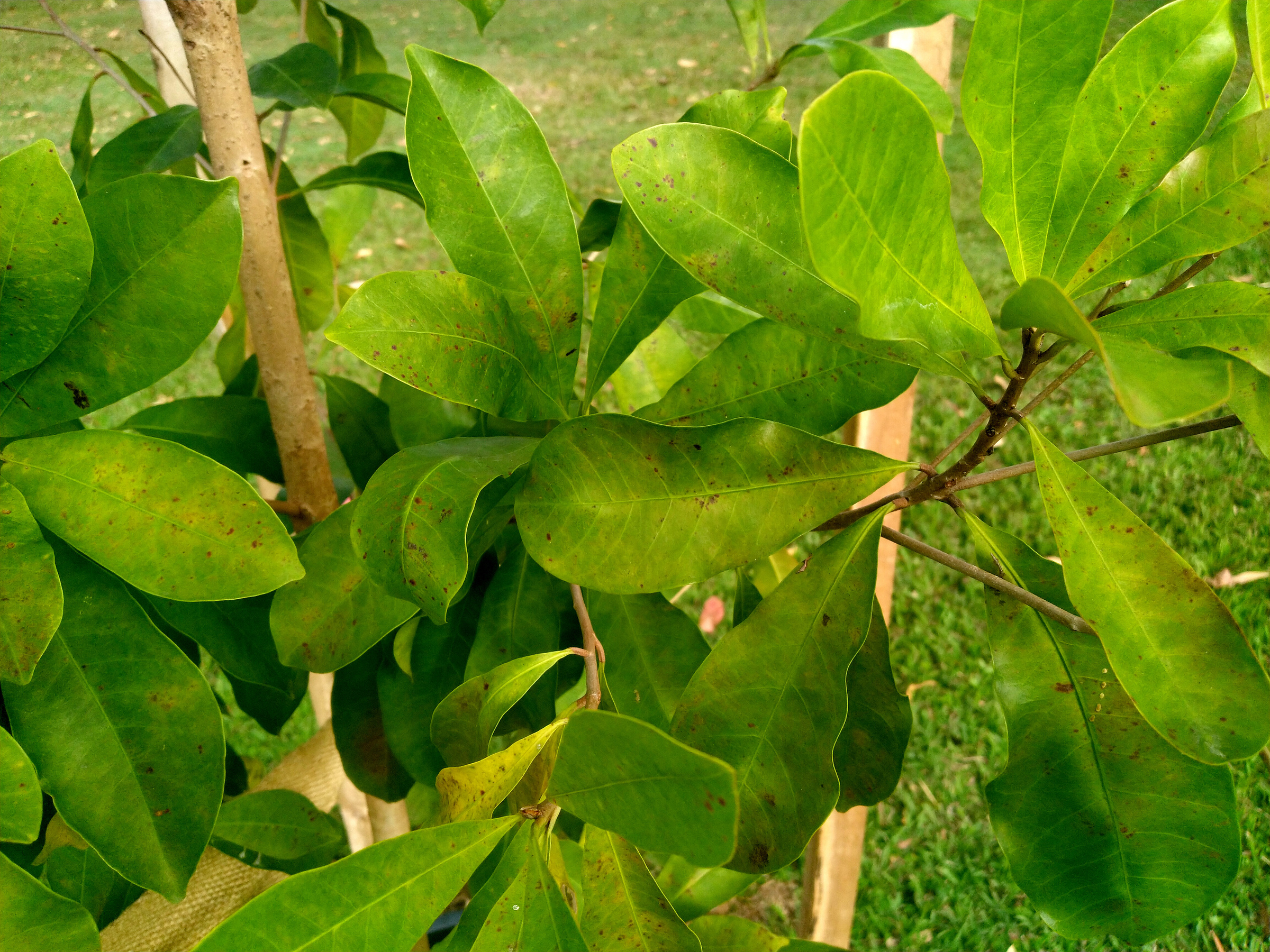
Foliage
