= Palaquium quercifolium =

Conservation status
- Least Concern (IUCN 3.1)

Scientific classification
- Kingdom: Plantae
- Clade: Tracheophytes
- Clade: Angiosperms
- Clade: Eudicots
- Clade: Asterids
- Order: Ericales
- Family: Sapotaceae
- Genus: Palaquium
- Species: P. quercifolium

Binomial name
- Palaquium quercifolium (de Vriese) Burck

Synonyms
- Croixia quercifolia (de Vriese) Baehni; Dichopsis argentata (Teijsm. & Binn.) Benth. & Hook.f.; Dichopsis macrophylla (de Vriese) Hook.f.; Isonandra argentata Teijsm. & Binn.; Isonandra macrophylla de Vriese; Isonandra quercifolia de Vriese; Palaquium argentatum (Teijsm. & Binn.) Pierre ex Burck; Palaquium macrophyllum (de Vriese) Pierre ex Dubard; Sideroxylon macrophyllum (de Vriese) Burck

Species of tree

Palaquium quercifolium is a tree in the family Sapotaceae. The specific epithet quercifolium refers to the leaves' similarity to the genus Quercus.

== Description ==
Palaquium quercifolium grows up to 30 metres (100 ft) tall. The bark is red brown. Inflorescences bear up to 10 brownish tomentose flowers. The fruits are round, up to 2 cm (1 in) in diameter.

== Distribution and habitat ==
Palaquium quercifolium is native to Sumatra, Borneo, Sulawesi and Ambon. Its habitat is lowland mixed dipterocarp forest and also swamp forest.
