= Palaquium xanthochymum =

Conservation status
- Vulnerable (IUCN 3.1)

Scientific classification
- Kingdom: Plantae
- Clade: Tracheophytes
- Clade: Angiosperms
- Clade: Eudicots
- Clade: Asterids
- Order: Ericales
- Family: Sapotaceae
- Genus: Palaquium
- Species: P. xanthochymum

Binomial name
- Palaquium xanthochymum (de Vriese) Pierre ex Burck

Synonyms
- Croixia xanthochyma (de Vriese) Baehni; Dichopsis rubens C.B.Clarke; Isonandra xanthochyma de Vriese; Palaquium rubens (C.B.Clarke) Engl.

Species of plant

Palaquium xanthochymum is a tree in the family Sapotaceae. The specific epithet xanthochymum means 'yellow latex'.

== Description ==
Palaquium xanthochymum grows up to 40 metres (130 ft) tall. The inflorescences bear up to five flowers. The fruits are oblong, up to 3.5 cm (1.4 in) long.

== Distribution and habitat ==
Palaquium xanthochymum is found in Sumatra, Peninsular Malaysia, Singapore, Java and Borneo. Its habitat is mixed swamp and dipterocarp forests to 400 m (1,300 ft) altitude.

== Conservation ==
Palaquium xanthochymum has been assessed as vulnerable on the IUCN Red List. It is mainly threatened by conversion of its habitat for palm oil plantations. The species' presence in protected areas such as the Central Catchment Nature Reserve in Singapore and Endau-Kota Tinggi (West) Wildlife Reserve in Malaysia affords it a level of protection in these places.

== Uses ==
Palaquium xanthochymum is harvested for its timber, which is used locally in boat building. Oil from the seeds is locally used in cooking. In Singapore, the species forms part of the diet of local Raffles' banded langurs.
