= Palaquium vexillatum =

Conservation status
- Endangered (IUCN 3.1)

Scientific classification
- Kingdom: Plantae
- Clade: Tracheophytes
- Clade: Angiosperms
- Clade: Eudicots
- Clade: Asterids
- Order: Ericales
- Family: Sapotaceae
- Genus: Palaquium
- Species: P. vexillatum

Binomial name
- Palaquium vexillatum P.Royen

Species of tree

Palaquium vexillatum is a tree in the family Sapotaceae. It is native to Borneo.

== Description ==
Palaquium vexillatum grows up to 38 m (120 ft) tall. Its light brown bark is fissured. The papery leaves are elliptic to ovate and measure up to 9 cm (4 in) long and up to 4.5 cm (1.8 in) wide. The inflorescences bear up to five flowers.

== Taxonomy ==
Palaquium vexillatum was first described by Dutch botanist Pieter van Royen in 1960. The type specimen was collected in Balikpapan in Borneo. The specific epithet vexillatum means 'flag-like', referring to the stipules.

== Distribution and habitat ==
Palaquium vexillatum is endemic to Borneo. Its habitat is in secondary forests, to elevations of 600 m (2,000 ft).

== Conservation ==
Palaquium vexillatum has been assessed as endangered on the IUCN Red List. The species' habitat is threatened by deforestation and conversion of land for plantations. The species is not known from any protected areas.
