= Dendrobium subbilobatum =

Scientific classification
- Kingdom: Plantae
- Clade: Embryophytes
- Clade: Tracheophytes
- Clade: Angiosperms
- Clade: Monocots
- Order: Asparagales
- Family: Orchidaceae
- Subfamily: Epidendroideae
- Genus: Dendrobium
- Species: D. subbilobatum

Binomial name
- Dendrobium subbilobatum Schltr.

Synonyms
- Dendrobium papiliolabratum P.Royen; Monanthos subbilobatus (Schltr.) Rauschert

Species of orchid

Dendrobium subbilobatum, synonym Dendrobium papiliolabratum, is a species of orchid found in New Guinea.
