= Palaquium kinabaluense =

Conservation status
- Endangered (IUCN 3.1)

Scientific classification
- Kingdom: Plantae
- Clade: Embryophytes
- Clade: Tracheophytes
- Clade: Angiosperms
- Clade: Eudicots
- Clade: Asterids
- Order: Ericales
- Family: Sapotaceae
- Genus: Palaquium
- Species: P. kinabaluense

Binomial name
- Palaquium kinabaluense P.Royen

Species of flowering plant

Palaquium kinabaluense is a tree in the family Sapotaceae. It is named after Mount Kinabalu in Malaysia's Sabah state, on Borneo.

== Description ==
Palaquium kinabaluense grows up to 20 m (70 ft) tall. The bark is pinkish green. Inflorescences bear up to eight flowers.

== Distribution and habitat ==
Palaquium kinabaluense is endemic to Borneo. Its habitat is mixed dipterocarp forest from sea-level to 1,000 m (3,300 ft) altitude.

== Conservation ==
Palaquium kinabaluense has been assessed as endangered on the IUCN Red List. The species is threatened by logging and land conversion for palm oil plantations. Subpopulations in Gunung Mulu National Park and Gunung Kinabalu National Park have some protection.
