= Palaquium cryptocariifolium =

Conservation status
- Near Threatened (IUCN 3.1)

Scientific classification
- Kingdom: Plantae
- Clade: Embryophytes
- Clade: Tracheophytes
- Clade: Angiosperms
- Clade: Eudicots
- Clade: Asterids
- Order: Ericales
- Family: Sapotaceae
- Genus: Palaquium
- Species: P. cryptocariifolium

Binomial name
- Palaquium cryptocariifolium P.Royen

Species of flowering plant

Palaquium cryptocariifolium is a tree in the family Sapotaceae. The specific epithet cryptocariifolium refers to the resemblance of the leaves to those of the tree genus Cryptocarya.

== Description ==
Palaquium cryptocariifolium grows up to 35 m (115 ft) tall. The bark is brownish grey. The fruits are ellipsoid, up to 1.5 cm (0.6 in) long.

== Distribution and habitat ==
Palaquium cryptocariifolium is native to Borneo, Peninsular Malaysia and Sumatra. Its habitat is mixed dipterocarp and kerangas forests at elevations above 950 m (3,100 ft).

== Conservation ==
Palaquium cryptocariifolium has been assessed as near threatened on the IUCN Red List. The species is threatened by logging and land conversion for palm oil plantations.
