= Palaquium pseudorostratum =

Conservation status
- Least Concern (IUCN 3.1)

Scientific classification
- Kingdom: Plantae
- Clade: Tracheophytes
- Clade: Angiosperms
- Clade: Eudicots
- Clade: Asterids
- Order: Ericales
- Family: Sapotaceae
- Genus: Palaquium
- Species: P. pseudorostratum

Binomial name
- Palaquium pseudorostratum H.J.Lam

Synonyms
- Croixia pseudorostrata (H.J.Lam) Baehni

Species of flowering plant

Palaquium pseudorostratum is a species of tree in the family Sapotaceae. The specific epithet pseudorostratum is for the species' similarity to Palaquium rostratum.

== Description ==
Palaquium pseudorostratum grows up to 30 m (100 ft) tall. The bark is reddish brown. Inflorescences bear up to four flowers. The fruits are up to 1.6 cm (0.6 in) long.

== Distribution and habitat ==
Palaquium pseudorostratum is native to Borneo and the Philippines. Its habitat is swamp and kerangas forests.
