= Palaquium sumatranum =

Conservation status
- Near Threatened (IUCN 3.1)

Scientific classification
- Kingdom: Plantae
- Clade: Tracheophytes
- Clade: Angiosperms
- Clade: Eudicots
- Clade: Asterids
- Order: Ericales
- Family: Sapotaceae
- Genus: Palaquium
- Species: P. sumatranum

Binomial name
- Palaquium sumatranum Burck

Synonyms
- Palaquium beauvisagei Burck; Palaquium teysmannianum Burck

Species of tree

Palaquium sumatranum is a tree in the family Sapotaceae. The specific epithet sumatranum means "of Sumatra".

== Description ==
Palaquium sumatranum grows up to 45 metres (150 ft) tall. The bark is rusty brown. Inflorescences bear up to three flowers. The fruits are ovoid or obovoid, up to 2.5 cm (1 in) long.

== Distribution and habitat ==
Palaquium sumatranum is native to Thailand, Sumatra, Borneo and Java. Its habitat is mixed dipterocarp forest.
