= Palaquium rufolanigerum =

Conservation status
- Least Concern (IUCN 3.1)

Scientific classification
- Kingdom: Plantae
- Clade: Tracheophytes
- Clade: Angiosperms
- Clade: Eudicots
- Clade: Asterids
- Order: Ericales
- Family: Sapotaceae
- Genus: Palaquium
- Species: P. rufolanigerum

Binomial name
- Palaquium rufolanigerum P.Royen

Species of tree

Palaquium rufolanigerum is a tree in the family Sapotaceae. The specific epithet rufolanigerum means 'reddish woolly', referring to the indumentum.

== Description ==
Palaquium rufolanigerum grows up to 30 metres (100 ft) tall. The bark is reddish brown. Inflorescences bear up to three brownish flowers. The fruits are round, up to 1.5 cm (1 in) in diameter.

== Distribution and habitat ==
Palaquium rufolanigerum is endemic to Borneo. Its habitat is montane forests.
