= Palaquium regina-montium =

Conservation status
- Vulnerable (IUCN 3.1)

Scientific classification
- Kingdom: Plantae
- Clade: Tracheophytes
- Clade: Angiosperms
- Clade: Eudicots
- Clade: Asterids
- Order: Ericales
- Family: Sapotaceae
- Genus: Palaquium
- Species: P. regina-montium

Binomial name
- Palaquium regina-montium Ng

Species of tree

Palaquium regina-montium is a species of plant in the family Sapotaceae. It is a tree endemic to Peninsular Malaysia. It is threatened by habitat loss.
