= Palaquium hexandrum =

Conservation status
- Near Threatened (IUCN 3.1)

Scientific classification
- Kingdom: Plantae
- Clade: Embryophytes
- Clade: Tracheophytes
- Clade: Angiosperms
- Clade: Eudicots
- Clade: Asterids
- Order: Ericales
- Family: Sapotaceae
- Genus: Palaquium
- Species: P. hexandrum

Binomial name
- Palaquium hexandrum (Griff.) Baill.

Synonyms
- Croixia hexandra (Griff.) Baehni; Dichopsis hexandra (Griff.) C.B.Clarke; Isonandra hexandra Griff.; Palaquium pisang Burck; Payena griffithii Kurz

Species of flowering plant

Palaquium hexandrum is a tree in the family Sapotaceae. It is native to Southeast Asia.

== Description ==
Palaquium hexandrum grows up to 50 m (160 ft) tall, with a trunk diameter of up to 120 cm (50 in). The bark is dark brown. The inflorescences bear up to 18 flowers. The edible fruits are round or ovoid, up to 3 cm (1.2 in) long.

== Taxonomy ==
Palaquium hexandrum was first described as Isonandra hexandra by British botanist William Griffith in 1854. In 1884, the French botanist Henri Ernest Baillon transferred the species to the genus Palaquium. The type specimen was collected in Malacca. The specific epithet hexandrum means 'six stamens', referring to the flowers.

== Distribution and habitat ==
Palaquium hexandrum is native to Sumatra, Peninsular Malaysia and Borneo. Its habitat is lowland forests, sometimes riverine.

== Uses ==
The seeds of Palaquium hexandrum are used in cooking. The latex is used to make gutta-percha. The timber is harvested and traded as nyatoh.

== Conservation ==
Palaquium hexandrum has been assessed as near threatened on the IUCN Red List. The significant threat to the species is deforestation: in Peninsular Malaysia and Borneo for conversion of land to palm oil cultivation.
