= Palaquium calophyllum =

Conservation status
- Least Concern (IUCN 3.1)

Scientific classification
- Kingdom: Plantae
- Clade: Embryophytes
- Clade: Tracheophytes
- Clade: Angiosperms
- Clade: Eudicots
- Clade: Asterids
- Order: Ericales
- Family: Sapotaceae
- Genus: Palaquium
- Species: P. calophyllum

Binomial name
- Palaquium calophyllum (Teijsm. & Binn.) Pierre ex Burck

Synonyms
- Croixia calophylla (Teijsm. & Binn.) Baehni; Dichopsis calophylla (Teijsm. & Binn.) Benth. & Hook.f.; Isonandra calophylla Teijsm. & Binn.

Species of flowering plant

Palaquium calophyllum is a tree in the family Sapotaceae. The specific epithet calophyllum means 'beautiful leaves'.

== Description ==
Palaquium calophyllum grows up to 20 m (70 ft) tall. The bark is brownish grey. The inflorescences bear up to 12 flowers. The fruits are round, up to 2 cm (0.8 in) in diameter.

== Distribution and habitat ==
Palaquium calophyllum is native to Sumatra, Borneo, the Philippines, Maluku and New Guinea. Its habitat is in forests from sea-level to 800 m (2,600 ft) altitude.
