= Palaquium impressionervium =

Conservation status
- Vulnerable (IUCN 3.1)

Scientific classification
- Kingdom: Plantae
- Clade: Tracheophytes
- Clade: Angiosperms
- Clade: Eudicots
- Clade: Asterids
- Order: Ericales
- Family: Sapotaceae
- Genus: Palaquium
- Species: P. impressionervium

Binomial name
- Palaquium impressionervium Ng

Synonyms
- Palaquium impressinervium Ng [orth. error]

Species of flowering plant

Palaquium impressionervium is a species of plant in the family Sapotaceae. It is found in Malaysia and Thailand. It is threatened by habitat loss.
