= Palaquium bataanense =

Conservation status
- Vulnerable (IUCN 2.3)

Scientific classification
- Kingdom: Plantae
- Clade: Tracheophytes
- Clade: Angiosperms
- Clade: Eudicots
- Clade: Asterids
- Order: Ericales
- Family: Sapotaceae
- Genus: Palaquium
- Species: P. bataanense

Binomial name
- Palaquium bataanense Merr.

Species of flowering plant

Palaquium bataanense is a species of plant in the family Sapotaceae. It is found in Indonesia and the Philippines. It is threatened by habitat loss.
