= Palaquium ridleyi =

Conservation status
- Least Concern (IUCN 3.1)

Scientific classification
- Kingdom: Plantae
- Clade: Tracheophytes
- Clade: Angiosperms
- Clade: Eudicots
- Clade: Asterids
- Order: Ericales
- Family: Sapotaceae
- Genus: Palaquium
- Species: P. ridleyi

Binomial name
- Palaquium ridleyi King & Gamble

Synonyms
- Palaquium ledermannii K.Krause; Palaquium poilanei Lecomte

Species of tree

Palaquium ridleyi is a tree in the family Sapotaceae. It is named for the English botanist Henry Nicholas Ridley.

== Description ==
Palaquium ridleyi grows up to 30 metres (100 ft) tall. The bark is brownish grey. Inflorescences bear up to 11 flowers. The fruits are obovoid, up to 1.5 cm (1 in) long. The timber is used for making shingles in Sumatra.

== Distribution and habitat ==
Palaquium ridleyi is found from Vietnam through Malesia to New Guinea. Its habitat is peat swamp and kerangas forests.
