= Palaquium elegans =

Conservation status
- Endangered (IUCN 3.1)

Scientific classification
- Kingdom: Plantae
- Clade: Tracheophytes
- Clade: Angiosperms
- Clade: Eudicots
- Clade: Asterids
- Order: Ericales
- Family: Sapotaceae
- Genus: Palaquium
- Species: P. elegans

Binomial name
- Palaquium elegans Griffioen & H.J.Lam

Species of tree

Palaquium elegans is a species of tree in the family Sapotaceae.

== Description ==
Palaquium elegans grows up to 24 m (80 ft) tall. The twigs are brownish. Inflorescences bear up to 10 flowers. The fruits are ovoid, up to 1.8 cm (0.7 in) long.

== Distribution and habitat ==
Palaquium elegans is endemic to Borneo, where it is confined to Sarawak. Its habitat is mixed dipterocarp forests.

== Conservation ==
Palaquium elegans has been assessed as endangered on the IUCN Red List. The species is threatened by logging and land conversion to palm oil plantations.
