= Palaquium ferrugineum =

Conservation status
- Data Deficient (IUCN 3.1)

Scientific classification
- Kingdom: Plantae
- Clade: Tracheophytes
- Clade: Angiosperms
- Clade: Eudicots
- Clade: Asterids
- Order: Ericales
- Family: Sapotaceae
- Genus: Palaquium
- Species: P. ferrugineum

Binomial name
- Palaquium ferrugineum Pierre ex Dubard

Species of tree

Palaquium ferrugineum is a tree in the family Sapotaceae. The specific epithet ferrugineum means 'rusty coloured', referring to the indumentum.

== Description ==
Palaquium ferrugineum features twigs that are reddish brown tomentose. The inflorescences bear up to six flowers.

== Distribution and habitat ==
Palaquium ferrugineum is endemic to Borneo, where it is known only from Sarawak. Its habitat is mixed dipterocarp forests.
