= Palaquium edenii =

Conservation status
- Data Deficient (IUCN 3.1)

Scientific classification
- Kingdom: Plantae
- Clade: Embryophytes
- Clade: Tracheophytes
- Clade: Angiosperms
- Clade: Eudicots
- Clade: Asterids
- Order: Ericales
- Family: Sapotaceae
- Genus: Palaquium
- Species: P. edenii

Binomial name
- Palaquium edenii Pierre ex Dubard

Species of flowering plant

Palaquium edenii is a tree in the family Sapotaceae.

== Description ==
Palaquium edenii has brownish twigs. The inflorescences bear up to three flowers. The fruits are ellipsoid, up to 1.5 cm (1 in) long.

== Distribution and habitat ==
Palaquium edenii is endemic to Borneo, where it is known only from Sarawak. Its habitat is mixed dipterocarp forests.
