= Palaquium majas =

Conservation status
- Least Concern (IUCN 3.1)

Scientific classification
- Kingdom: Plantae
- Clade: Tracheophytes
- Clade: Angiosperms
- Clade: Eudicots
- Clade: Asterids
- Order: Ericales
- Family: Sapotaceae
- Genus: Palaquium
- Species: P. majas

Binomial name
- Palaquium majas H.J.Lam

Synonyms
- Croixia majas (H.J.Lam) Baehni

Species of tree

Palaquium majas is a species of tree in the family Sapotaceae. The specific epithet majas is from the Dayak word for the orang-utan of Borneo, referring to the brownish indumentum.

== Description ==
Palaquium majas grows up to 24 metres (80 ft) tall. The bark is brown. Inflorescences bear up to eight flowers. The fruits are ellipsoid or round, up to 2 centimetres (1 in) long.

== Distribution and habitat ==
Palaquium majas is endemic to Borneo. Its habitat is lowland mixed dipterocarp forest from sea level to 550 metres (1,800 ft) altitude.
