= Palaquium rivulare =

Conservation status
- Least Concern (IUCN 3.1)

Scientific classification
- Kingdom: Plantae
- Clade: Tracheophytes
- Clade: Angiosperms
- Clade: Eudicots
- Clade: Asterids
- Order: Ericales
- Family: Sapotaceae
- Genus: Palaquium
- Species: P. rivulare

Binomial name
- Palaquium rivulare H.J.Lam

Species of tree

Palaquium rivulare is a species of tree in the family Sapotaceae. It is native to Borneo.

== Description ==
Palaquium rivulare grows up to 20 metres (70 ft) tall. The bark is pale brown. Inflorescences bear up to 10 brownish flowers.

== Taxonomy ==
Palaquium rivulare was first described by Dutch botanist Herman Johannes Lam in the Bulletin du Jardin Botanique de Buitenzorg in 1927. The type specimen was collected on Borneo. The specific epithet rivulare means 'inhabiting rivers'.

== Distribution and habitat ==
Palaquium rivulare is endemic to Borneo. Its habitat is mixed dipterocarp, limestone and riparian forests.

== Conservation ==
Palaquium rivulare has been assessed as least concern on the IUCN Red List. The species' habitat is threatened by logging and by conversion of land for palm oil plantations. The species is present in protected areas including Lambir Hills National Park and Kinabalu Park.
