= Palaquium rostratum =

Conservation status
- Least Concern (IUCN 3.1)

Scientific classification
- Kingdom: Plantae
- Clade: Tracheophytes
- Clade: Angiosperms
- Clade: Eudicots
- Clade: Asterids
- Order: Ericales
- Family: Sapotaceae
- Genus: Palaquium
- Species: P. rostratum

Binomial name
- Palaquium rostratum (Miq.) Burck

Synonyms
- List: Croixia rostrata (Miq.) Baehni; Isonandra rostrata Miq.; Palaquium bancanum Burck; Palaquium calophylloides Ridl.; Palaquium linggense Burck; Palaquium membranaceum Burck; Palaquium parviflorum Burck; Palaquium parvifolium Burck; Palaquium payenifolium Pierre ex Becc.; Palaquium verstegii Burck

Species of flowering plant

Palaquium rostratum is a tree in the family Sapotaceae. It is native to Southeast Asia.

== Description ==
Palaquium rostratum grows up to 45 m (150 ft) tall. The bark is greyish brown. Inflorescences bear up to two brownish tomentose flowers. The fruits are ellipsoid, up to 3.5 cm (1.4 in) long. The timber is used for furniture-making.

== Taxonomy ==
Palaquium rostratum was first described as Isonandra rostrata by the Dutch botanist Friedrich Anton Wilhelm Miquel in 1861 in Flora van Nederlandsch Indie. In 1885, Dutch botanist William Burck transferred the species to the genus Palaquium. The type specimen was from Bangka Island, off Sumatra. The specific epithet rostratum means 'beaked', likely referring to the fruit.

== Distribution and habitat ==
Palaquium rostratum is native to southern Thailand, Peninsular Malaysia and many areas of maritime Southeast Asia including the Philippines, Sumatra, Borneo, Java, the Maluku Islands and Sulawesi. Its habitat is mixed dipterocarp and kerangas forests from sea level to 1,200 m (4,000 ft) altitude.

== Conservation ==
Palaquium rostratum has been assessed as least concern on the IUCN Red List. The species has a large area of distribution. However, the species' habitat is threatened by deforestation, particularly in Sumatra. The species is present in some protected areas, such as Kinabalu Park in Borneo.

== Uses ==
The fruit of Palaquium rostratum is edible. The seeds are locally turned into cooking oil. The timber is used in making furniture.
