= Palaquium hornei =

Conservation status
- Least Concern (IUCN 3.1)

Scientific classification
- Kingdom: Plantae
- Clade: Tracheophytes
- Clade: Angiosperms
- Clade: Eudicots
- Clade: Asterids
- Order: Ericales
- Family: Sapotaceae
- Genus: Palaquium
- Species: P. hornei

Binomial name
- Palaquium hornei (Hartog ex Baker) Dubard

Synonyms
- Croixia hornei (Hartog ex Baker) Baehni; Dichopsis hornei Hartog ex Baker

Species of plant

Palaquium hornei is a tree in the family Sapotaceae.

== Description ==
Palaquium hornei grows as an evergreen tree, 6–24 metres (20–80 ft) tall. The trunk measures up to 60 cm (24 in) in diameter. Its timber is locally harvested.

== Distribution and habitat ==
Palaquium hornei is endemic to Fiji, where it is confined to the islands of Viti Levu, Vanua Levu and Kadavu. Its habitat is moist forests, at altitudes of 100–610 m (300–2,000 ft).
