= Palaquium rioense =

Conservation status
- Near Threatened (IUCN 3.1)

Scientific classification
- Kingdom: Plantae
- Clade: Tracheophytes
- Clade: Angiosperms
- Clade: Eudicots
- Clade: Asterids
- Order: Ericales
- Family: Sapotaceae
- Genus: Palaquium
- Species: P. rioense

Binomial name
- Palaquium rioense H.J.Lam

Species of tree

Palaquium rioense is a species of tree in the family Sapotaceae. The specific epithet rioense refers to Sumatra's Riau province.

== Description ==
Palaquium rioense grows up to 40 m (130 ft) tall. The bark is brown. The flowers are brownish. The fruits are obovoid, up to 2 cm (0.8 in) long.

== Distribution and habitat ==
Palaquium rioense is native to Riau and Borneo. Its habitat is hill and montane forests at 300–1,500 metres (1,000–5,000 ft) altitude.

== Conservation ==
Palaquium rioense has been assessed as near threatened on the IUCN Red List. The species' habitat is threatened by harvesting for its timber. In Borneo, it is also threatened by conversion of land for palm oil plantations. The species is in Kinabalu National Park which affords it some protection.
