= Palaquium longifolium =

Conservation status
- Least Concern (IUCN 3.1)

Scientific classification
- Kingdom: Plantae
- Clade: Embryophytes
- Clade: Tracheophytes
- Clade: Angiosperms
- Clade: Eudicots
- Clade: Asterids
- Order: Ericales
- Family: Sapotaceae
- Genus: Palaquium
- Species: P. longifolium

Binomial name
- Palaquium longifolium (H.J.Lam) A.Phang

Synonyms
- Aulandra longifolia H.J.Lam; Aulandra cauliflora H.J.Lam

Species of plant

Palaquium longifolium, synonym Aulandra longifolia, is a species of flowering plant in the family Sapotaceae. The specific epithet longifolium means 'long leaf'.

== Description ==
Palaquium longifolium grows as a tree up to 20 metres (70 ft) tall, with a trunk diameter of up to 25 cm (10 in). Its bark is greyish brown. The flowers are white to creamy.

== Distribution and habitat ==
Palaquium longifolium is endemic to Borneo. Its habitat is mixed dipterocarp forest to 1,000 m (3,000 ft) altitude.
