= Palaquium ottolanderi =

Conservation status
- Near Threatened (IUCN 3.1)

Scientific classification
- Kingdom: Plantae
- Clade: Tracheophytes
- Clade: Angiosperms
- Clade: Eudicots
- Clade: Asterids
- Order: Ericales
- Family: Sapotaceae
- Genus: Palaquium
- Species: P. ottolanderi

Binomial name
- Palaquium ottolanderi Koord. & Valeton

Synonyms
- Croixia ottelanderi (Koord. & Valeton) Baehni

Species of tree

Palaquium ottolanderi is a tree in the family Sapotaceae.

== Description ==
Palaquium ottolanderi grows up to 30 metres (100 ft) tall. The twigs are brownish tomentose. Inflorescences bear up to 16 flowers. The fruits are oblong, up to 7 cm (3 in) long.

== Distribution and habitat ==
Palaquium ottolanderi is native to Thailand, Peninsular Malaysia, Sumatra, Java and Borneo. Its habitat is lowland mixed dipterocarp forests.

== Conservation ==
Palaquium ottolanderi has been assessed as near threatened on the IUCN Red List. The species is threatened by logging and land conversion for palm oil plantations.
