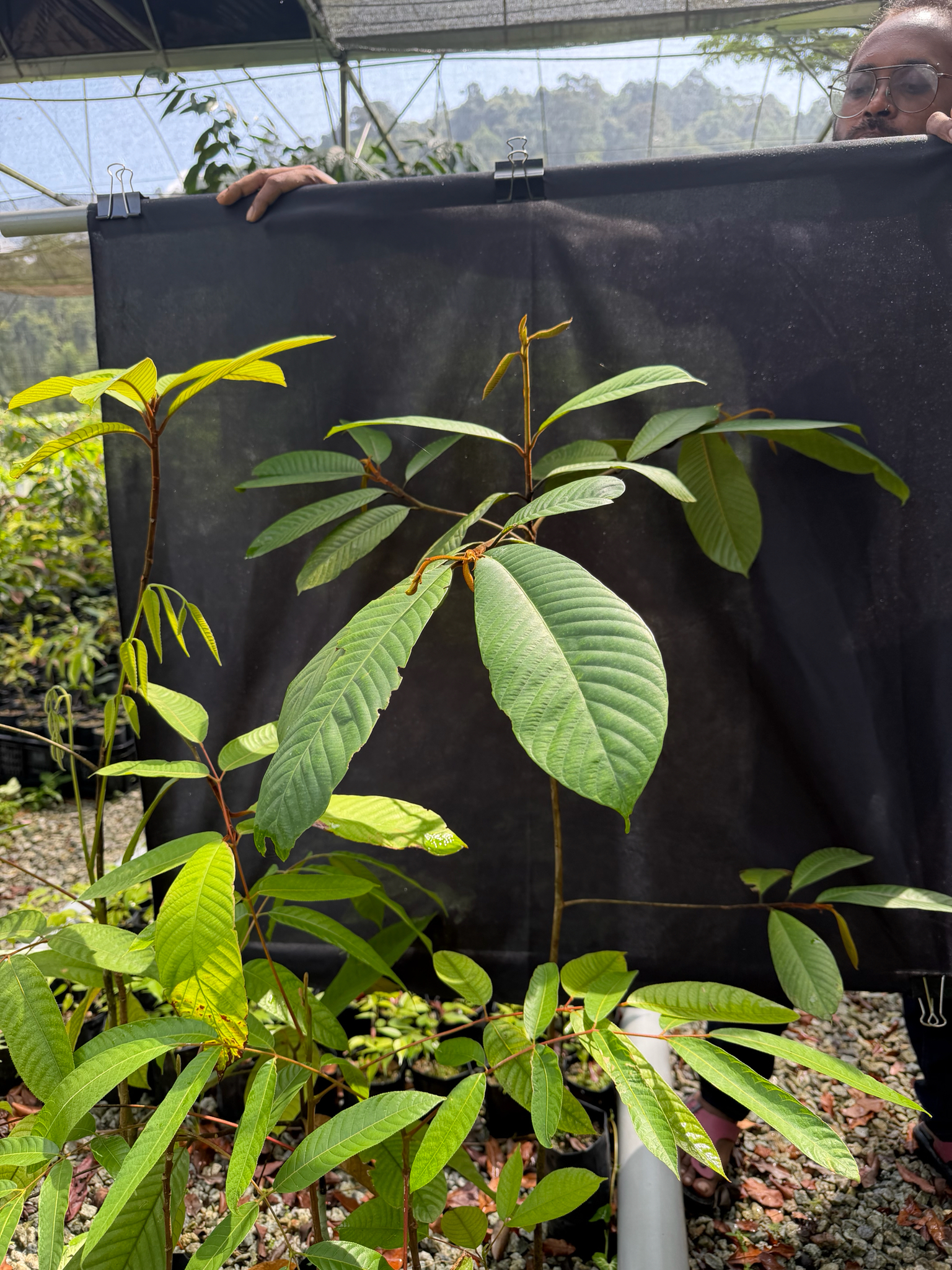
- In Malaysia

Conservation status
- Vulnerable (IUCN 3.1)

Scientific classification
- Kingdom: Plantae
- Clade: Embryophytes
- Clade: Tracheophytes
- Clade: Spermatophytes
- Clade: Angiosperms
- Clade: Eudicots
- Clade: Asterids
- Order: Ericales
- Family: Sapotaceae
- Genus: Palaquium
- Species: P. hispidum

Binomial name
- Palaquium hispidum H.J.Lam

Synonyms
- Croixia hispida (H.J.Lam) Baehni; Palaquium hispidum var. grandiflorum H.J.Lam

= Palaquium hispidum =

Species of flowering plant

Palaquium hispidum is a species of tree in the family Sapotaceae. The specific epithet hispidum means 'coarsely hairy, bristly', referring to the species' twigs, buds, leaves and inflorescences which have such hair.

== Description ==
Palaquium hispidum grows up to 50 m (160 ft) tall. The bark is greyish white. Inflorescences bear up to eight flowers. The fruits are subglobose, up to 2.4 cm (1 in) long.

== Distribution and habitat ==
Palaquium hispidum is native to Sumatra, Peninsular Malaysia and Borneo. Its habitat is lowland mixed dipterocarp forests.

== Conservation ==
Palaquium hispidum has been assessed as vulnerable on the IUCN Red List. The species is threatened by logging and conversion of forest land to palm oil plantations.
