= Palaquium dasyphyllum =

Conservation status
- Least Concern (IUCN 3.1)

Scientific classification
- Kingdom: Plantae
- Clade: Embryophytes
- Clade: Tracheophytes
- Clade: Angiosperms
- Clade: Eudicots
- Clade: Asterids
- Order: Ericales
- Family: Sapotaceae
- Genus: Palaquium
- Species: P. dasyphyllum

Binomial name
- Palaquium dasyphyllum Pierre ex Dubard

Synonyms
- Madhuca dasyphylla Baehni; Palaquium stenophyllum H.J.Lam

Species of flowering plant

Palaquium dasyphyllum is a tree in the family Sapotaceae. The specific epithet dasyphyllum means 'thickly hairy leaves'.

== Description ==
Palaquium dasyphyllum grows up to 36 m (120 ft) tall, with a trunk diameter of up to 65 cm (30 in). The bark is dark brown. The inflorescences bear up to 10 flowers. The fruits are round, up to 2.4 cm (1 in) in diameter.

== Distribution and habitat ==
Palaquium dasyphyllum is endemic to Borneo. Its habitat is mainly in dipterocarp forests above 950 m (3,100 ft) altitude.
