= Palaquium pseudocuneatum =

Conservation status
- Least Concern (IUCN 3.1)

Scientific classification
- Kingdom: Plantae
- Clade: Tracheophytes
- Clade: Angiosperms
- Clade: Eudicots
- Clade: Asterids
- Order: Ericales
- Family: Sapotaceae
- Genus: Palaquium
- Species: P. pseudocuneatum

Binomial name
- Palaquium pseudocuneatum H.J.Lam

Synonyms
- Croixia pseudocuneata (H.J.Lam) Baehni

Species of flowering plant

Palaquium pseudocuneatum is a species of tree in the family Sapotaceae. The specific epithet pseudocuneatum means 'somewhat wedge-shaped', referring to the leaf base.

== Description ==
Palaquium pseudocuneatum grows up to 35 m (110 ft) tall. The bark is reddish to greyish brown. Inflorescences bear up to three flowers. The fruits are ellipsoid, up to 4 cm (1.6 in) long.

== Distribution and habitat ==
Palaquium pseudocuneatum is endemic to Borneo. Its habitat is swamp and hill forests.
