= Palaquium rigidum =

Scientific classification
- Kingdom: Plantae
- Clade: Tracheophytes
- Clade: Angiosperms
- Clade: Eudicots
- Clade: Asterids
- Order: Ericales
- Family: Sapotaceae
- Genus: Palaquium
- Species: P. rigidum

Binomial name
- Palaquium rigidum Pierre ex Dubard

Species of tree

Palaquium rigidum is a tree in the family Sapotaceae. The specific epithet rigidum means 'rigid', referring to the leaves.

== Description ==
Palaquium rigidum grows up to 25 metres (80 ft) tall. The bark is reddish grey. Inflorescences bear up to four flowers. The fruits are round, up to 10 cm (4 in) in diameter.

== Distribution and habitat ==
Palaquium rigidum is endemic to Borneo where it is confined to Sarawak. Its habitat is lowland mixed dipterocarp forests.
