= Palaquium lisophyllum =

Conservation status
- Data Deficient (IUCN 3.1)

Scientific classification
- Kingdom: Plantae
- Clade: Tracheophytes
- Clade: Angiosperms
- Clade: Eudicots
- Clade: Asterids
- Order: Ericales
- Family: Sapotaceae
- Genus: Palaquium
- Species: P. lisophyllum

Binomial name
- Palaquium lisophyllum Pierre ex Dubard

Species of tree

Palaquium lisophyllum is a tree in the family Sapotaceae. The specific epithet lisophyllum means 'smooth leaves'.

== Description ==
Palaquium lisophyllum grows up to 20 metres (70 ft) tall. The twigs are brownish. Inflorescences bear up to four flowers.

== Distribution and habitat ==
Palaquium lisophyllum is endemic to Borneo. Its habitat is mixed dipterocarp forests.
