= Palaquium decurrens =

Conservation status
- Least Concern (IUCN 3.1)

Scientific classification
- Kingdom: Plantae
- Clade: Embryophytes
- Clade: Tracheophytes
- Clade: Angiosperms
- Clade: Eudicots
- Clade: Asterids
- Order: Ericales
- Family: Sapotaceae
- Genus: Palaquium
- Species: P. decurrens

Binomial name
- Palaquium decurrens H.J.Lam

Synonyms
- Croixia decurrens (H.J.Lam) Baehni

Species of flowering plant

Palaquium decurrens is a species of tree in the family Sapotaceae. The specific epithet decurrens means 'running down', referring to the leaf base.

== Description ==
Palaquium decurrens grows up to 34 m (100 ft) tall, with a trunk diameter of up to 50 cm (20 in). The bark is dark brown. Inflorescences bear up to eight flowers. The fruits are ellipsoid, up to 3 cm (1.2 in) long.

== Distribution and habitat ==
Palaquium decurrens is endemic to Borneo. Its habitat is lowland mixed dipterocarp forests.
