= Palaquium sericeum =

Conservation status
- Least Concern (IUCN 3.1)

Scientific classification
- Kingdom: Plantae
- Clade: Tracheophytes
- Clade: Angiosperms
- Clade: Eudicots
- Clade: Asterids
- Order: Ericales
- Family: Sapotaceae
- Genus: Palaquium
- Species: P. sericeum

Binomial name
- Palaquium sericeum H.J.Lam

Species of flowering plant

Palaquium sericeum is a species of tree in the family Sapotaceae. The specific epithet sericeum means 'silky', referring to the indumentum.

== Description ==
Palaquium sericeum grows up to 22 metres (70 ft) tall. The bark is reddish brown. Inflorescences bear up to 20 flowers. The fruits are round or ellipsoid, up to 2.7 cm (1 in) long.

== Distribution and habitat ==
Palaquium sericeum is endemic to Borneo. Its habitat is mainly in lowland forests, primarily mixed dipterocarp forest.

== Conservation ==
Palaquium sericeum has been assessed as least-concern on the IUCN Red List. The species' habitat is threatened by logging and by conversion of land for palm oil plantations. The species is present in some protected areas, including Kayan Mentarang National Park in North Kalimantan province.
