= Palaquium crassifolium =

Conservation status
- Endangered (IUCN 3.1)

Scientific classification
- Kingdom: Plantae
- Clade: Embryophytes
- Clade: Tracheophytes
- Clade: Angiosperms
- Clade: Eudicots
- Clade: Asterids
- Order: Ericales
- Family: Sapotaceae
- Genus: Palaquium
- Species: P. crassifolium

Binomial name
- Palaquium crassifolium Pierre ex Dubard

Species of flowering plant

Palaquium crassifolium is a tree in the family Sapotaceae. The inflorescences bear up to three flowers. The specific epithet crassifolium means 'thick leaves'.

== Distribution and habitat ==
Palaquium crassifolium is endemic to Borneo, where it is known only from Sarawak. Its habitat is mixed dipterocarp forests.

== Conservation ==
Palaquium crassifolium has been assessed as endangered on the IUCN Red List. The species is considered uncommon and is threatened by logging and land clearance for palm oil plantations.
