= Palaquium stipulare =

Conservation status
- Endangered (IUCN 3.1)

Scientific classification
- Kingdom: Plantae
- Clade: Tracheophytes
- Clade: Angiosperms
- Clade: Eudicots
- Clade: Asterids
- Order: Ericales
- Family: Sapotaceae
- Genus: Palaquium
- Species: P. stipulare

Binomial name
- Palaquium stipulare Pierre ex Dubard

Synonyms
- Palaquium richardsii Griffioen & H.J.Lam

Species of tree

Palaquium stipulare is a tree in the family Sapotaceae. The specific epithet stipulare refers to the stipules.

== Description ==
Palaquium stipulare grows up to 30 metres (100 ft) tall. The bark is brownish grey. Inflorescences bear up to four flowers. The fruits are round, up to 2.7 cm (1 in) in diameter.

== Distribution and habitat ==
Palaquium stipulare is endemic to Borneo, where it confined to Sarawak and Brunei. Its habitat is lowland mixed dipterocarp forests.

== Conservation ==
Palaquium stipulare has been assessed as endangered on the IUCN Red List. The species' habitat is threatened by deforestation and conversion of land for plantations, such as for palm oil. The species is present in Bako National Park, affording a level of protection there.
