= Palaquium leiocarpum =

Conservation status
- Near Threatened (IUCN 3.1)

Scientific classification
- Kingdom: Plantae
- Clade: Embryophytes
- Clade: Tracheophytes
- Clade: Angiosperms
- Clade: Eudicots
- Clade: Asterids
- Order: Ericales
- Family: Sapotaceae
- Genus: Palaquium
- Species: P. leiocarpum

Binomial name
- Palaquium leiocarpum Boerl.

Synonyms
- Croixia leiocarpa (Boerl.) Baehni; Palaquium molle Pierre ex Becc.

Species of flowering plant

Palaquium leiocarpum is a tree in the family Sapotaceae. The specific epithet leiocarpum means 'smooth fruit'.

== Description ==
Palaquium leiocarpum grows up to 30 m (100 ft) tall. The bark is brownish to reddish grey. Inflorescences bear up to six flowers. The fruits are ellipsoid or round, up to 2.5 cm (1 in) long.

== Distribution and habitat ==
Palaquium leiocarpum is native to Peninsular Malaysia, Borneo, Sulawesi and possibly Sumatra. Its habitat is mixed swamp forest, mixed dipterocarp forest and kerangas forest.

== Conservation ==
Palaquium leiocarpum has been assessed as near threatened on the IUCN Red List. The species is threatened by logging and conversion of land for palm oil plantations.
