= Palaquium walsurifolium =

Conservation status
- Near Threatened (IUCN 3.1)

Scientific classification
- Kingdom: Plantae
- Clade: Tracheophytes
- Clade: Angiosperms
- Clade: Eudicots
- Clade: Asterids
- Order: Ericales
- Family: Sapotaceae
- Genus: Palaquium
- Species: P. walsurifolium

Binomial name
- Palaquium walsurifolium Pierre ex Dubard

Species of tree

Palaquium walsurifolium is a tree in the family Sapotaceae. The specific epithet walsurifolium refers to similarity of the tree's leaves to those of the genus Walsura.

== Description ==
Palaquium walsurifolium grows up to 30 m (100 ft) tall. The bark is rusty brown. Inflorescences bear up to five flowers. The roundish fruits measure up to 1.8 cm (1 in) in diameter.

== Distribution and habitat ==
Palaquium walsurifolium is native to Sumatra, Peninsular Malaysia and Borneo. Its habitat is peat swamp and lowland mixed dipterocarp and alluvial forests.

== Conservation ==
Palaquium walsurifolium has been assessed as near threatened on the IUCN Red List. The species' habitat is threatened by deforestation and conversion of land for plantations and agriculture. In Borneo, habitat is threatened by logging and conversion of land for palm oil plantations. However, the species is present in some protected areas such as Gunung Gading National Park and Lambir Hills National Parks in Sarawak in Malaysian Borneo.

== Uses ==
The latex of Palaquium walsurifolium is used to make gutta-percha. The species has edible fruits. Its timber is locally used for furniture and flooring.
