= Palaquium zeylanicum =

Conservation status
- Vulnerable (IUCN 3.1)

Scientific classification
- Kingdom: Plantae
- Clade: Tracheophytes
- Clade: Angiosperms
- Clade: Eudicots
- Clade: Asterids
- Order: Ericales
- Family: Sapotaceae
- Genus: Palaquium
- Species: P. zeylanicum

Binomial name
- Palaquium zeylanicum Verdc.

Species of flowering plant

Palaquium zeylanicum is a species of plant in the family Sapotaceae. It is endemic to Sri Lanka.The genus Palaquium is known for producing gutta-percha, a natural rubber like substance.
