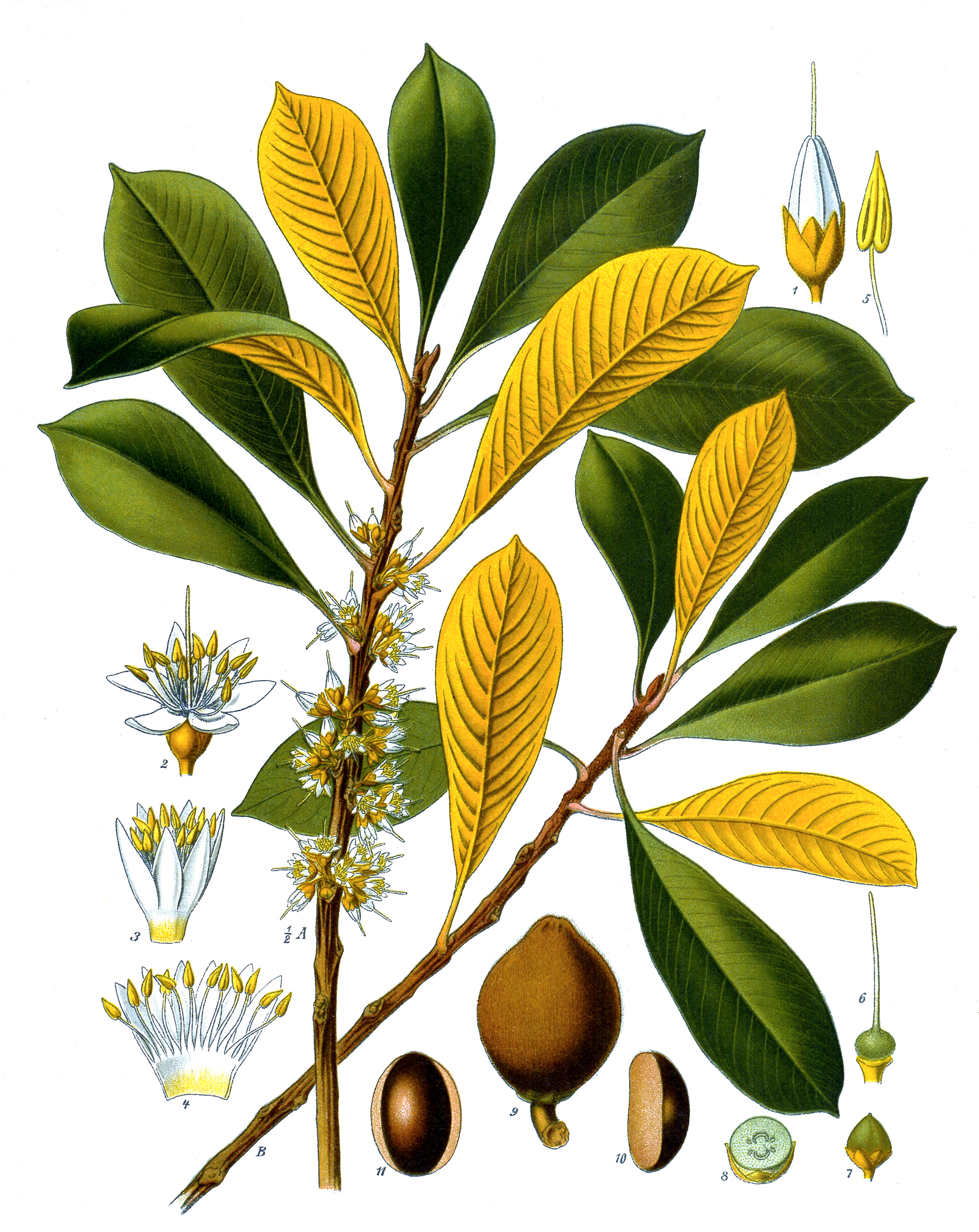
- Botanical drawing, 1897

Conservation status
- Near Threatened (IUCN 3.1)

Scientific classification
- Kingdom: Plantae
- Clade: Embryophytes
- Clade: Tracheophytes
- Clade: Angiosperms
- Clade: Eudicots
- Clade: Asterids
- Order: Ericales
- Family: Sapotaceae
- Genus: Palaquium
- Species: P. gutta

Binomial name
- Palaquium gutta (Hook.) Baill.

Synonyms
- List: Croixia gutta (Hook.) Baehni; Dichopsis borneensis (Burck) Fox; Dichopsis gutta (Hook.) Benth.; Dichopsis oblongifolia Burck; Dichopsis treubii (Burck) Fox; Isonandra acuminata Miq.; Isonandra gutta Hook.; Isonandra percha Hook.; Palaquium acuminatum Burck; Palaquium borneense Pierre; Palaquium borneense Burck; Palaquium croixianum Pierre ex Dubard; Palaquium formosum Pierre; Palaquium fulvosericeum Engl.; Palaquium gloegoerense Burck; Palaquium malaccense Pierre; Palaquium oblongifolium (Burck) Burck; Palaquium obscurum Burck; Palaquium optimum Becc.; Palaquium princeps Pierre; Palaquium selendit Burck; Palaquium treubii Burck; Palaquium vrieseanum Burck

= Palaquium gutta =

Species of tree

Palaquium gutta is a tree in the family Sapotaceae. It is native to Southeast Asia.

== Description ==
Palaquium gutta grows up to 40 m (130 ft) tall. The bark is reddish brown. Inflorescences bear up to 12 flowers. The fruits are round or ellipsoid, sometimes brownish tomentose, up to 2.5 cm (1 in) long.

== Taxonomy ==
Palaquium gutta was first described as Isonandra gutta by English botanist William Jackson Hooker in his London Journal of Botany in 1847. In 1884, the French botanist Henri Ernest Baillon transferred the species to the genus Palaquium. The lectotype was collected in Singapore. The specific epithet gutta is from the Malay word getah meaning 'sap or latex'.

== Distribution and habitat ==
Palaquium gutta is native to Sumatra, Peninsular Malaysia, Borneo and Singapore. Its habitat is lowland mixed dipterocarp, kerangas and limestone forests.

== Uses ==
The seeds of Palaquium gutta are used to make soap and candles, occasionally in cooking. The latex is used to make gutta-percha. The timber is logged and traded as nyatoh.

== Conservation ==
Palaquium gutta has been assessed as near threatened on the IUCN Red List. The significant threat to the species is deforestation: in Borneo for conversion of land to palm oil cultivation.
