= Palaquium beccarii =

Conservation status
- Critically Endangered (IUCN 3.1)

Scientific classification
- Kingdom: Plantae
- Clade: Embryophytes
- Clade: Tracheophytes
- Clade: Angiosperms
- Clade: Eudicots
- Clade: Asterids
- Order: Ericales
- Family: Sapotaceae
- Genus: Palaquium
- Species: P. beccarii

Binomial name
- Palaquium beccarii Pierre ex Dubard

Synonyms
- Aulandra beccarii (Pierre ex Dubard) P.Royen

Species of flowering plant

Palaquium beccarii, synonym Aulandra beccarii, is a plant in the family Sapotaceae. It grows as a small tree. The twigs are reddish brown. Flowers are pale yellow. Palaquium beccarii is endemic to Borneo.

Palaquium beccarii grows on steep hill slopes in sandy soil in lowland mixed dipterocarp forest at about 300 meters elevation.
