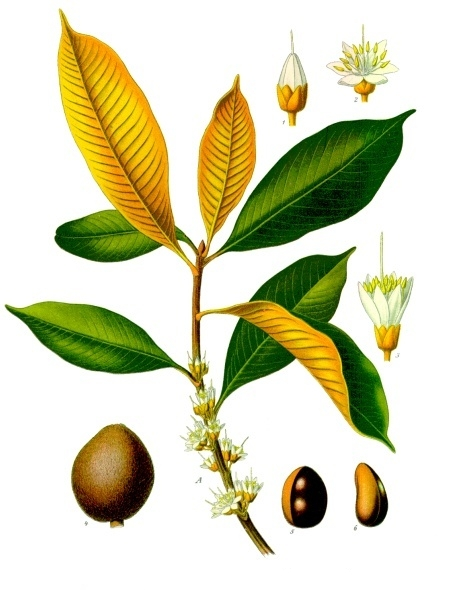
- Palaquium gutta

Scientific classification
- Kingdom: Plantae
- Clade: Embryophytes
- Clade: Tracheophytes
- Clade: Spermatophytes
- Clade: Angiosperms
- Clade: Eudicots
- Clade: Asterids
- Order: Ericales
- Family: Sapotaceae
- Subfamily: Sapotoideae
- Genus: Palaquium; Blanco

Synonyms
- Aulandra H.J.Lam; Croixia Pierre; Dichopsis Thwaites; Galactoxylon Pierre; Treubella Pierre

= Palaquium =

Genus of trees

Palaquium is a genus of about 120 species of trees in the family Sapotaceae. Their range is from India across Southeast Asia, Malesia, Papuasia, and Australasia, to the western Pacific Islands.

== Description ==
Within their range, Palaquium species are mostly found in the Philippines and Borneo. In Borneo, many species are recorded in the Malaysian states of Sabah and Sarawak.

The leaves are typically spirally arranged and often clustered near twig ends. Flowers are mostly bisexual, though some unisexual instances are known. Fruits are one- or two-seeded with rare instances of several seeds. Palaquium habitats are coastal, lowland mixed dipterocarp, swamp, and montane forests.

Some species, for example Palaquium gutta, are well known for producing gutta-percha latex.

== Species ==
As of July 2026 Plants of the World Online accepts these species:

- Palaquium abundantiflorum H.J.Lam
- Palaquium amboinense Burck
- Palaquium annamense Lecomte
- Palaquium aulandrum A.Phang
- Palaquium barnesii Merr.
- Palaquium bataanense Merr.
- Palaquium beccarianum (Pierre) P.Royen
- Palaquium beccarii Pierre ex Dubard
- Palaquium bintuluense Chantar.
- Palaquium bourdillonii Brandis
- Palaquium brassii H.J.Lam
- Palaquium burckii H.J.Lam
- Palaquium calophyllum (Teijsm. & Binn.) Pierre ex Burck
- Palaquium canaliculatum (Thwaites) Engl.
- Palaquium clarkeanum King & Gamble
- Palaquium cochleariifolium P.Royen
- Palaquium confertum H.J.Lam
- Palaquium crassifolium Pierre ex Dubard
- Palaquium cryptocariifolium P.Royen
- Palaquium cuprifolium Elmer
- Palaquium dasyphyllum Pierre ex Dubard
- Palaquium decurrens H.J.Lam
- Palaquium densivenium K.Krause
- Palaquium dubardii Elmer
- Palaquium edenii Pierre ex Dubard
- Palaquium elegans Griffoen & H.J.Lam
- Palaquium ellipticum (Dalzell) Baill.
- Palaquium elliptilimbum Merr.
- Palaquium elongatum Merr.
- Palaquium eriocalyx H.J.Lam
- Palaquium erythrospermum H.J.Lam
- Palaquium ferrugineum Pierre ex Dubard
- Palaquium fidjiense Pierre ex Dubard
- Palaquium firmum C.T.White
- Palaquium formosanum Hayata
- Palaquium foxworthyi Merr.
- Palaquium galactoxylum (F.Muell.) H.J.Lam
- Palaquium garrettii Fletcher
- Palaquium gigantifolium Merr.
- Palaquium glabrifolium Merr.
- Palaquium glabrum Merr.
- Palaquium globosum H.J.Lam
- Palaquium grande (Thwaites) Engl.
- Palaquium gutta (Hook.) Burck
- Palaquium hansenii Chantaranothai
- Palaquium herveyi King & Gamble
- Palaquium heterosepalum Merr.
- Palaquium hexandrum (Griff.) Baill.
- Palaquium hinmolpedda P.Royen
- Palaquium hispidum H.J.Lam
- Palaquium hornei (Hartog ex Baker) Dubard
- Palaquium impressionervium Ng
- Palaquium karrak Kaneh.
- Palaquium kinabaluense P.Royen
- Palaquium laevifolium (Thwaites) Engl.
- Palaquium lanceolatum Blanco
- Palaquium leiocarpum Boerl.
- Palaquium lisophyllum Pierre ex Dubard
- Palaquium lobbianum Burck
- Palaquium loheri Merr.
- Palaquium longifolium (H.J.Lam) A.Phang
- Palaquium luzoniense (Fern.-Vill.) Vidal
- Palaquium macrocarpum Burck
- Palaquium maingayi (C.B.Clarke) Engl.
- Palaquium majas H.J.Lam
- Palaquium maliliense P.Royen
- Palaquium masuui P.Royen
- Palaquium merrillii Dubard
- Palaquium microphyllum King & Gamble
- Palaquium mindanaense Merr.
- Palaquium montanum Elmer
- Palaquium morobense P.Royen
- Palaquium multiflorum Pierre ex Dubard
- Palaquium neoebudicum Guillaumin
- Palaquium njatoh Burck
- Palaquium obovatum (Griff.) Engl.
- Palaquium obtusifolium Burck
- Palaquium oleosum Burck
- Palaquium ottolanderi Koord. & Valeton
- Palaquium pauciflorum (Thwaites) Engl.
- Palaquium petiolare (Thwaites) Engl.
- Palaquium philippense (Perr.) C.B.Rob.
- Palaquium pierrei Burck
- Palaquium pinnatinervium Elmer
- Palaquium polyandrum C.B.Rob.
- Palaquium polyanthum (Wall. ex G.Don) Baill.
- Palaquium porphyreum A.C.Sm. & S.P.Darwin
- Palaquium pseudocalophyllum H.J.Lam
- Palaquium pseudocuneatum H.J.Lam
- Palaquium pseudorostratum H.J.Lam
- Palaquium pustulatum Dunstan
- Palaquium quercifolium (de Vriese) Burck
- Palaquium ravii Sasidh. & Vink
- Palaquium regina-montium Ng
- Palaquium ridleyi King & Gamble
- Palaquium rigidum Pierre ex Dubard
- Palaquium rioense H.J.Lam
- Palaquium rivulare H.J.Lam
- Palaquium rostratum (Miq.) Burck
- Palaquium rubiginosum (Thwaites) Engl.
- Palaquium rufolanigerum P.Royen
- Palaquium sambasense Pierre ex Dubard
- Palaquium semaram H.J.Lam
- Palaquium sericeum H.J.Lam
- Palaquium simun P.Royen
- Palaquium sorsogonense Elmer ex H.J.Lam
- Palaquium stehlinii Christoph.
- Palaquium stellatum King & Gamble
- Palaquium stipulare Pierre ex Dubard
- Palaquium sukoei C.E.C.Fisch.
- Palaquium sumatranum Burck
- Palaquium supfianum Schltr.
- Palaquium tenuifolium K.Krause
- Palaquium tenuipetiolatum Merr.
- Palaquium thwaitesii Trimen
- Palaquium tjipetirense H.J.Lam
- Palaquium vexillatum P.Royen
- Palaquium vidalii Pierre ex Dubard
- Palaquium vitilevuense Gilly ex Royen
- Palaquium walsurifolium Pierre ex Dubard
- Palaquium warburgianum Schltr. ex K.Krause
- Palaquium xanthochymum (de Vriese) Pierre ex Burck
- Palaquium zeylanicum Verdc.
