= Palaquium tenuipetiolatum =

Conservation status
- Near Threatened (IUCN 3.1)

Scientific classification
- Kingdom: Plantae
- Clade: Tracheophytes
- Clade: Angiosperms
- Clade: Eudicots
- Clade: Asterids
- Order: Ericales
- Family: Sapotaceae
- Genus: Palaquium
- Species: P. tenuipetiolatum

Binomial name
- Palaquium tenuipetiolatum Merr.

Synonyms
- Croixia tenuipetiolata (Merr.) Baehni; Palaquium vulcanicum Elmer ex Merr.

Species of flowering plant

Palaquium tenuipetiolatum is a tree in the family Sapotaceae, native to the Philippines.

== Description ==
Palaquium tenuipetiolatum grows up to 30 m (100 ft) tall. The papery leaves are elliptic and measure up to 7 cm (3 in) long and up to 2.5 cm (1 in) wide. Inflorescences bear up to three flowers. The fruits are ovoid, measuring up to 2.5 cm (1 in) long. The species' timber is locally used to make furniture.

== Taxonomy ==
Palaquium tenuipetiolatum was first described by the American botanist Elmer Drew Merrill in 1904. The type specimen was collected at the Lamao River in the Province of Bataan on Luzon, Philippines. The specific epithet tenuipetiolatum means 'thin leaf stalk', referring to the petiole.

== Distribution and habitat ==
Palaquium tenuipetiolatum is endemic to the Philippines. It was previously thought to also be native to Borneo, but its presence there now warrants further investigation. Its habitat is in primary and hill forests.

== Conservation ==
Palaquium tenuipetiolatum has been assessed as near threatened on the IUCN Red List. The species' habitat is threatened by logging for its timber and by conversion of its habitat for other purposes including plantations and agriculture. However, the species is present in a number of protected areas, including Mount Calavite Wildlife Sanctuary, Mount Guiting-Guiting Natural Park, Bulusan Volcano Natural Park and Agusan Marsh Wildlife Sanctuary.
