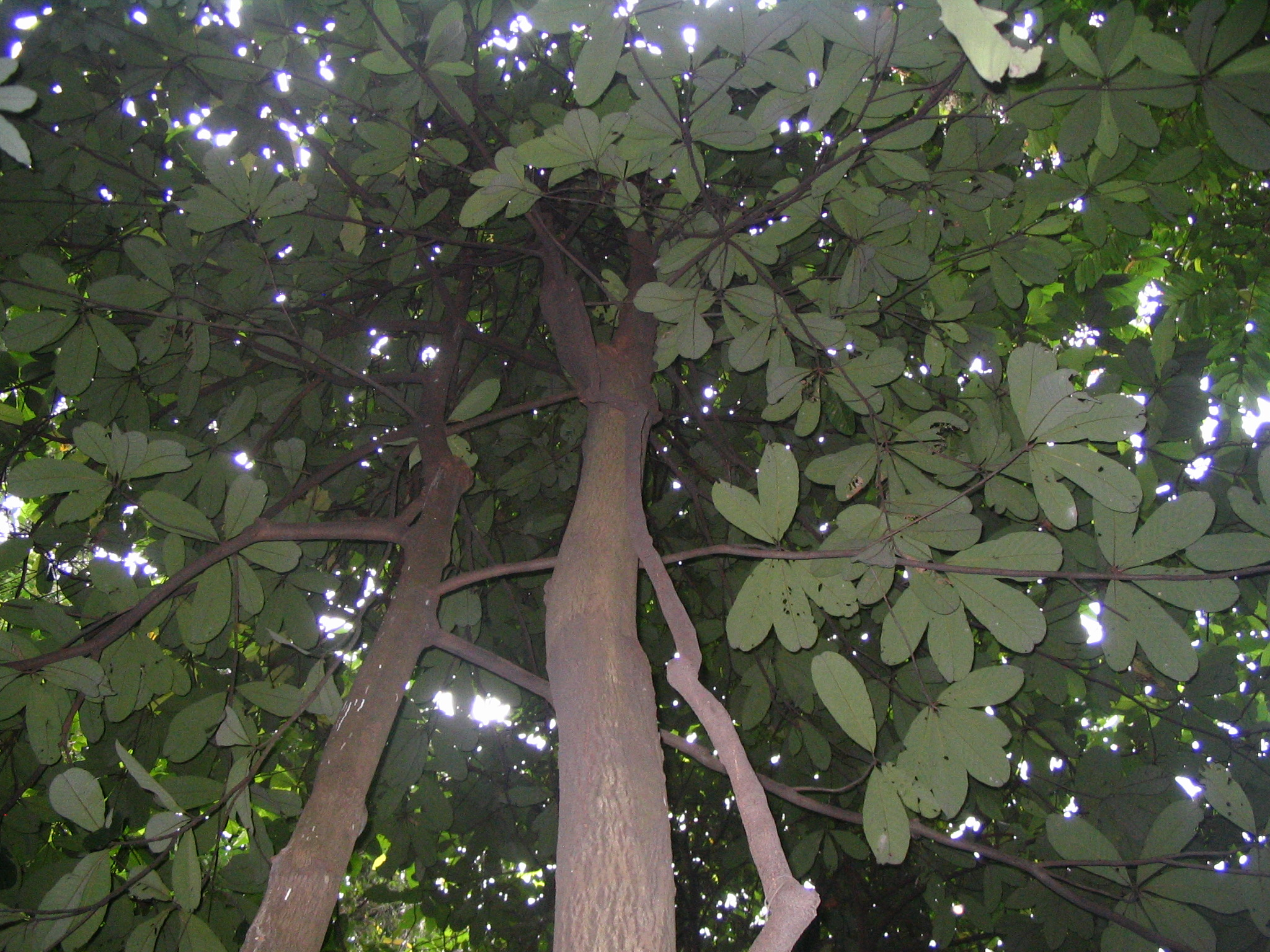

Conservation status
- Vulnerable (IUCN 3.1)

Scientific classification
- Kingdom: Plantae
- Clade: Tracheophytes
- Clade: Angiosperms
- Clade: Eudicots
- Clade: Asterids
- Order: Ericales
- Family: Sapotaceae
- Genus: Palaquium
- Species: P. maingayi

Binomial name
- Palaquium maingayi (C.B.Clarke) Engl.

= Palaquium maingayi =

Species of flowering plant

Palaquium maingayi is a species of plant in the family Sapotaceae. It is native to Peninsular Malaysia, Borneo and Thailand.
