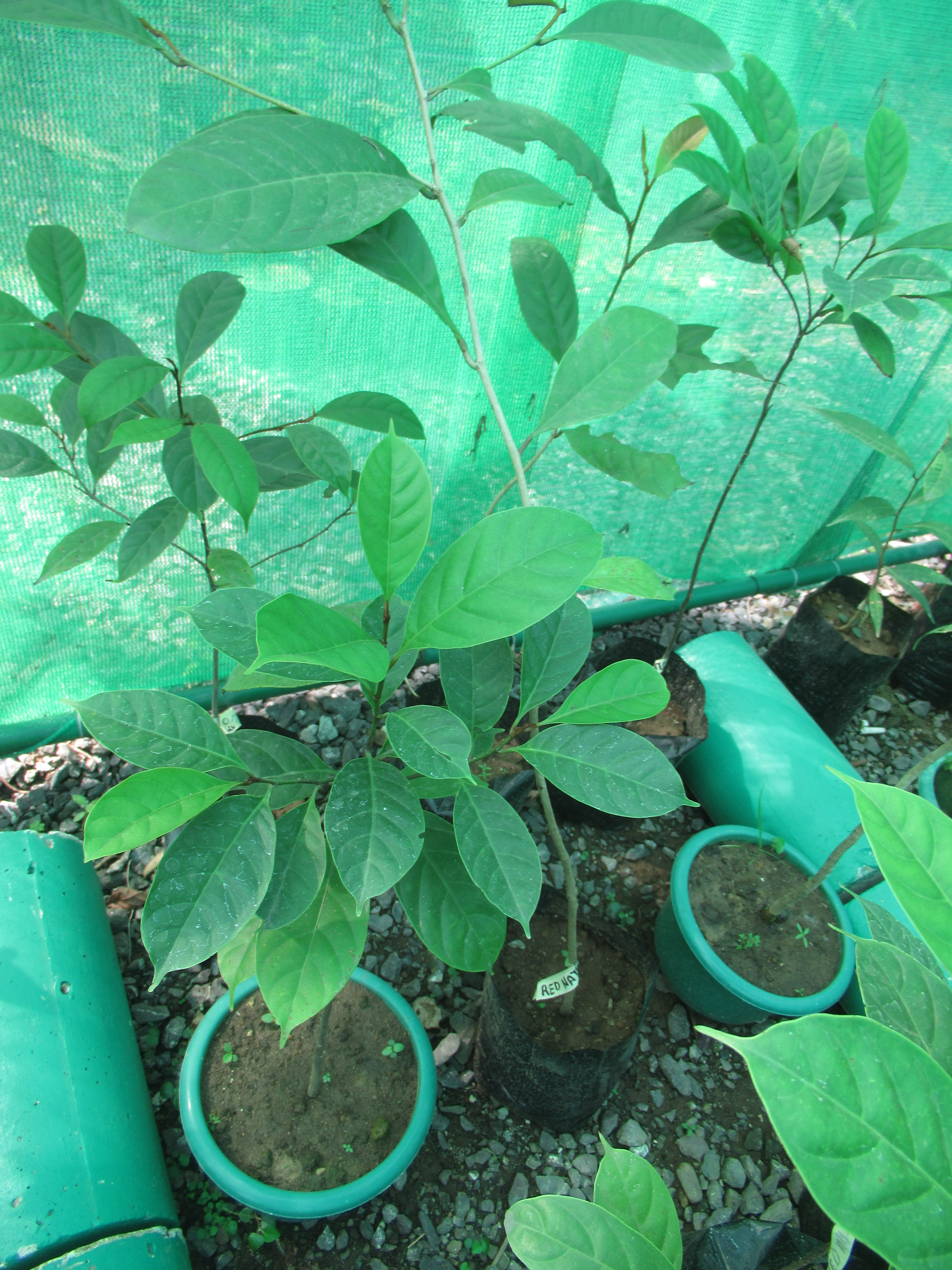

Conservation status
- Vulnerable (IUCN 2.3)

Scientific classification
- Kingdom: Plantae
- Clade: Tracheophytes
- Clade: Angiosperms
- Clade: Eudicots
- Clade: Asterids
- Order: Ericales
- Family: Sapotaceae
- Genus: Palaquium
- Species: P. luzoniense

Binomial name
- Palaquium luzoniense (Fern.-Vill.) Vidal

Synonyms
- Croixia luzoniensis (Fern.-Vill.) Baehni; Dichopsis luzoniensis Fern.-Vill.; Palaquium ahernianum Merr.; Palaquium latifolium Náves ex Fern.-Vill.

= Palaquium luzoniense =

Species of plant

Palaquium luzoniense, also called red nato, is a species of plant in the family Sapotaceae. It is endemic to the Philippines. It is threatened by habitat loss.
