= Palaquium supfianum =

Scientific classification
- Kingdom: Plantae
- Clade: Tracheophytes
- Clade: Angiosperms
- Clade: Eudicots
- Clade: Asterids
- Order: Ericales
- Family: Sapotaceae
- Genus: Palaquium
- Species: P. supfianum

Binomial name
- Palaquium supfianum Schltr.

Synonyms
- Palaquium inutile Schltr. ex K.Krause

Species of tree

Palaquium supfianum is a tree in the family Sapotaceae.

== Description ==
Palaquium supfianum grows up to 35 metres (110 ft) tall. The twigs are brownish. Inflorescences bear up to five flowers.

== Distribution and habitat ==
Palaquium supfianum is native to New Guinea. Its habitat is mixed dipterocarp forest at around 800 metres (3,000 ft) altitude.
