= Palaquium stellatum =

Conservation status
- Near Threatened (IUCN 3.1)

Scientific classification
- Kingdom: Plantae
- Clade: Tracheophytes
- Clade: Angiosperms
- Clade: Eudicots
- Clade: Asterids
- Order: Ericales
- Family: Sapotaceae
- Genus: Palaquium
- Species: P. stellatum

Binomial name
- Palaquium stellatum King & Gamble

Synonyms
- Bassia watsonii Ridl.; Dichopsis stellata Scort. ex King & Gamble; Madhuca watsonii (Ridl.) H.J.Lam

Species of tree

Palaquium stellatum is a tree in the family Sapotaceae. The specific epithet stellatum means 'star-like', referring to some of the indumentum hairs.

== Description ==
Palaquium stellatum grows up to 40 metres (130 ft) tall. The bark is brownish. Inflorescences bear up to five flowers. The fruits are roundish, up to 2.5 cm (1 in) in diameter. The tree's timber is heavy and strong.

== Distribution and habitat ==
Palaquium stellatum is native to Sumatra, Peninsular Malaysia and Borneo. Its habitat is lowland mixed dipterocarp forests.

== Conservation ==
Palaquium stellatum has been assessed as near threatened on the IUCN Red List. Its habitat in Sumatra and Borneo is threatened by deforestation for logging and for conversion of land to palm oil plantations. It is estimated that the species' habitat has experienced a 20% loss of tree cover in 2000–2017 alone. The species is present in the protected areas of Taman Negara in Peninsular Malaysia and Crocker Range National Park in Sabah.

== Uses ==
The timber of Palaquium stellatum is locally used in construction. The fruits and seeds are edible. The latex can be used as gutta-percha.
