= Palaquium multiflorum =

Conservation status
- Endangered (IUCN 3.1)

Scientific classification
- Kingdom: Plantae
- Clade: Tracheophytes
- Clade: Angiosperms
- Clade: Eudicots
- Clade: Asterids
- Order: Ericales
- Family: Sapotaceae
- Genus: Palaquium
- Species: P. multiflorum

Binomial name
- Palaquium multiflorum Pierre ex Dubard

Synonyms
- Isonandra emarginata H.J.Lam

Species of tree

Palaquium multiflorum is a tree in the family Sapotaceae. The specific epithet multiflorum means 'many flowers'.

== Description ==
Palaquium multiflorum grows up to 8 metres (30 ft) tall. The bark is reddish brown. The inflorescences bear up to seven flowers. The fruits are round, up to 2.5 cm (1 in) in diameter.

== Distribution and habitat ==
Palaquium multiflorum is endemic to Borneo, where it is known from Sarawak and Brunei. Its habitat is mostly kerangas forests, occasionally mixed dipterocarp forests.

== Conservation ==
Palaquium multiflorum has been assessed as endangered on the IUCN Red List. The species is threatened by logging and conversion of land for palm oil plantations.
