= Palaquium beccarianum =

Conservation status
- Least Concern (IUCN 3.1)

Scientific classification
- Kingdom: Plantae
- Clade: Embryophytes
- Clade: Tracheophytes
- Clade: Angiosperms
- Clade: Eudicots
- Clade: Asterids
- Order: Ericales
- Family: Sapotaceae
- Genus: Palaquium
- Species: P. beccarianum

Binomial name
- Palaquium beccarianum (Pierre) P.Royen

Synonyms
- Croixia beccariana Pierre; Croixia borneensis Pierre ex Dubard; Palaquium ferox H.J.Lam; Planchonella beccarianum (Pierre) Dubard; Planchonella pierreana Dubard; Sideroxylon beccarianum (Pierre) Merr.; Sideroxylon pierreanum (Dubard) Merr.

Species of flowering plant

Palaquium beccarianum is a tree in the family Sapotaceae. It is named for the Italian naturalist Odoardo Beccari.

== Description ==
Palaquium beccarianum grows up to 20 m (70 ft) tall. The bark is reddish brown. The inflorescences bear up to five flowers. The fruits are ellipsoid, up to 3.5 cm (1.4 in) long.

== Distribution and habitat ==
Palaquium beccarianum is endemic to Borneo. Its habitat is mostly in lowland mixed dipterocarp forests.
