= Palaquium microphyllum =

Conservation status
- Near Threatened (IUCN 3.1)

Scientific classification
- Kingdom: Plantae
- Clade: Tracheophytes
- Clade: Angiosperms
- Clade: Eudicots
- Clade: Asterids
- Order: Ericales
- Family: Sapotaceae
- Genus: Palaquium
- Species: P. microphyllum

Binomial name
- Palaquium microphyllum King & Gamble

Synonyms
- Croixia microphylla (King & Gamble) Baehni

Species of tree

Palaquium microphyllum is a tree in the family Sapotaceae. The specific epithet microphyllum means 'small leaves'.

== Description ==
Palaquium microphyllum grows up to 30 metres (100 ft) tall. The bark is reddish brown. Inflorescences bear up to four flowers. The fruits are round, up to 2.5 cm (1 in) in diameter.

== Distribution and habitat ==
Palaquium microphyllum is native to Sumatra, Peninsular Malaysia, Singapore and Borneo. Its habitat is swamps, mixed dipterocarp and kerangas forests.

== Conservation ==
Palaquium microphyllum has been assessed as near threatened on the IUCN Red List. The species is threatened by logging and conversion of land for palm oil plantations.
