= Palaquium mindanaense =

Conservation status
- Critically Endangered (IUCN 3.1)

Scientific classification
- Kingdom: Plantae
- Clade: Tracheophytes
- Clade: Angiosperms
- Clade: Eudicots
- Clade: Asterids
- Order: Ericales
- Family: Sapotaceae
- Genus: Palaquium
- Species: P. mindanaense

Binomial name
- Palaquium mindanaense Merr.

Species of flowering plant

Palaquium mindanaense is a species of plant in the family Sapotaceae. It is endemic to the Philippines, where it is confined to Mindanao.
