= Palaquium fidjiense =

Conservation status
- Data Deficient (IUCN 3.1)

Scientific classification
- Kingdom: Plantae
- Clade: Tracheophytes
- Clade: Angiosperms
- Clade: Eudicots
- Clade: Asterids
- Order: Ericales
- Family: Sapotaceae
- Genus: Palaquium
- Species: P. fidjiense

Binomial name
- Palaquium fidjiense Pierre ex Dubard

Species of tree

Palaquium fidjiense is a tree in the family Sapotaceae.

== Description ==
Palaquium fidjiense grows as an evergreen tree, 5–30 metres (20–100 ft) tall. The trunk measures up to 90 cm (40 in) in diameter. Its timber is locally harvested.

== Distribution and habitat ==
Palaquium fidjiense is endemic to Fiji, where it is known from the islands of Viti Levu, Vanua Levu, Kadavu, Ovalau and Waya. Its habitat is in forests, or along ridges, at altitudes of 180–1,120 m (600–3,700 ft).
