= Palaquium herveyi =

Conservation status
- Near Threatened (IUCN 3.1)

Scientific classification
- Kingdom: Plantae
- Clade: Embryophytes
- Clade: Tracheophytes
- Clade: Angiosperms
- Clade: Eudicots
- Clade: Asterids
- Order: Ericales
- Family: Sapotaceae
- Genus: Palaquium
- Species: P. herveyi

Binomial name
- Palaquium herveyi King & Gamble

Synonyms
- Croixia herveyi (King & Gamble) Baehni

Species of flowering plant

Palaquium herveyi is a tree in the family Sapotaceae.

== Description ==
Palaquium herveyi grows up to 45 metres (150 ft) tall. The bark is reddish brown. Inflorescences bear up to six brownish flowers. The fruits are ellipsoid, up to 1.4 cm (1 in) long.

== Distribution and habitat ==
Palaquium herveyi is native to Peninsular Malaysia and Borneo. Its habitat is mixed dipterocarp forests.

== Conservation ==
Palaquium herveyi has been assessed as near threatened on the IUCN Red List. The species is threatened by logging and conversion of forest land to palm oil plantations.
