= Palaquium thwaitesii =

Conservation status
- Endangered (IUCN 3.1)

Scientific classification
- Kingdom: Plantae
- Clade: Tracheophytes
- Clade: Angiosperms
- Clade: Eudicots
- Clade: Asterids
- Order: Ericales
- Family: Sapotaceae
- Genus: Palaquium
- Species: P. thwaitesii

Binomial name
- Palaquium thwaitesii Trimen

Species of flowering plant

Palaquium thwaitesii is a species of plant in the family Sapotaceae. It is endemic to Sri Lanka.

== Leaves ==
Scattered, oblong-lanceolate-linear, tapering ends, lateral veins inconspicuous.

== Trunk ==
Young parts rusty hairy.

== Flowers ==
Solitary or 2's in leaf axils.

== Fruits ==
Ovoid, pointed berry.

== Ecology ==
Rain forest understory of wet zone.

== Uses ==
Wood - plywood.
