= Palaquium rubiginosum =

Conservation status
- Vulnerable (IUCN 3.1)

Scientific classification
- Kingdom: Plantae
- Clade: Tracheophytes
- Clade: Angiosperms
- Clade: Eudicots
- Clade: Asterids
- Order: Ericales
- Family: Sapotaceae
- Genus: Palaquium
- Species: P. rubiginosum

Binomial name
- Palaquium rubiginosum (Thwaites) Engl.

Species of flowering plant

Palaquium rubiginosum is a species of plant in the family Sapotaceae. It is endemic to Sri Lanka.
