= Palaquium grande =

Conservation status
- Near Threatened (IUCN 3.1)

Scientific classification
- Kingdom: Plantae
- Clade: Tracheophytes
- Clade: Angiosperms
- Clade: Eudicots
- Clade: Asterids
- Order: Ericales
- Family: Sapotaceae
- Genus: Palaquium
- Species: P. grande

Binomial name
- Palaquium grande (Thwaites) Engl.

Species of tree

Palaquium grande is a species of plant in the family Sapotaceae. It is endemic to Sri Lanka.
