= Palaquium canaliculatum =

Conservation status
- Endangered (IUCN 3.1)

Scientific classification
- Kingdom: Plantae
- Clade: Tracheophytes
- Clade: Angiosperms
- Clade: Eudicots
- Clade: Asterids
- Order: Ericales
- Family: Sapotaceae
- Genus: Palaquium
- Species: P. canaliculatum

Binomial name
- Palaquium canaliculatum (Thwaites) Engl.

Species of flowering plant

Palaquium canaliculatum is a species of flowering plant in the family Sapotaceae. It is endemic to Sri Lanka. It is a rare species known from only eight locations in evergreen forest habitat.
