= Francis S.P. Ng =

Malaysian botanist of Chinese descent (born 1940)

Francis S.P. Ng (born 1940) is a Malaysian botanist of Chinese descent, who received his PhD in 1971 from Wolfson College, Oxford. Ng is a former Deputy Director-General of the Forest Research Institute Malaysia, the history of which he describes in a partially autobiographical book. In 2009 he was awarded the David Fairchild Medal for Plant Exploration by the National Tropical Botanical Garden for "forest ecology research primarily in Malaysia, including tropical Asian forest trees, introduction of rare and endangered species into cultivation, and conservation of Malaysian ecosystems".
