= William Burck =

Dutch botanist

William Burck (4 February 1848 in Monnickendam, the Netherlands – 25 September 1910 in Leiden, the Netherlands) was a Dutch botanist. He obtained a doctorate from Leiden University in 1874. In 1881 he became Assistant Director of the then Buitenzorg Botanical Gardens (now Bogor Botanical Gardens) in Java. He collected a large number of plant specimens from locations including the Padang Highlands of western Sumatra. The genus Burckella is named for him.

He was elected a corresponding member of the Royal Netherlands Academy of Arts and Sciences in 1885 and resigned in 1903. He was re-admitted as member in 1907.
