= Pieter van Royen =

Dutch botanist

Pieter van Royen (1923-2002) was a Dutch botanist. He is an author of many papers on the flora of New Guinea.

== Life ==
Pieter van Royen was born in Lahat, South Sumatra in Dutch East Indies. In 1933, he moved with his family from the Dutch East Indies to the Netherlands. He obtained his doctorate at the University of Utrecht in 1951 with the first volume of a monograph on the Podostemaceae of the Neotropics, the second and third volumes of which he presented in 1953 and 1954, respectively.

From 1951 to 1962, he worked at the Rijksherbarium in Leiden, from 1954 to 1955 he undertook his first botanical exploration in New Guinea. From 1962 to 1965, he was employed at the Lae Botanical Garden there and from 1964 to 1965 at the Queensland Herbarium in Brisbane, Australia.

In May 1967, he became a curator at the BP Bishop Museum Herbarium in Honolulu, Hawaii; he held this position until his retirement in 1983. During this time he devoted himself continuously to further research into the flora of New Guinea.

With his work, Van Royen has significantly enhanced knowledge of the New Guinea flora. His monograph on the Podostemonaceae is a fundamental standard work up to the present day; the American botanist C. Thomas Philbrick wrote about it: “Much of our current knowledge of the taxonomy of the New World Podostemaceae is based in large part on the work of Dr. P. van Royen."

== Honors ==
The genus Van-royena Aubrév. from the family of Sapotaceae was named in 1964 by van Royen. The generic name Vanroyenella Novelo & C.T.Philbrick from the Podostemaceae family also honored P. van Royen. It is now classed as a synonym of Marathrum Bonpl.

== Works (selection) ==
- The Podostemaceae of the New World, Vol. I, in: Meded. Bot. Mus. Herb. Rijks Univ. Utrecht, 107: 1–151, 1951
- The Podostemaceae of the New World, Vol. II, in: Acta Bot. Neerl. 2 (1): 1-21, 1953
- The Podostemaceae of the New World, Vol. III, in: Acta Bot. Neerl. 3: 215–263,1954
- The genus Rubus [Rosaceae] in New Guinea, Vaduz, Cramer, 1969
- P. van Royen & PR Reitz, Podostemáceas, in: PR Reitz. (Ed.). Flora Illustrada Catarinense, 1a (5): 2-36, 1971
- Sertulum Papuanum 17. Corsiaceae of New Guinea and surrounding areas, in: Webbia 27: pp. 223–255, 1972
- The alpine flora of New Guinea, Vaduz, 1979, ISBN 3768212440
- Genus Corybas (Orchidaceae in Its Eastern Areas), 1984, ISBN 3768213676
