= Flora of the Philippines =

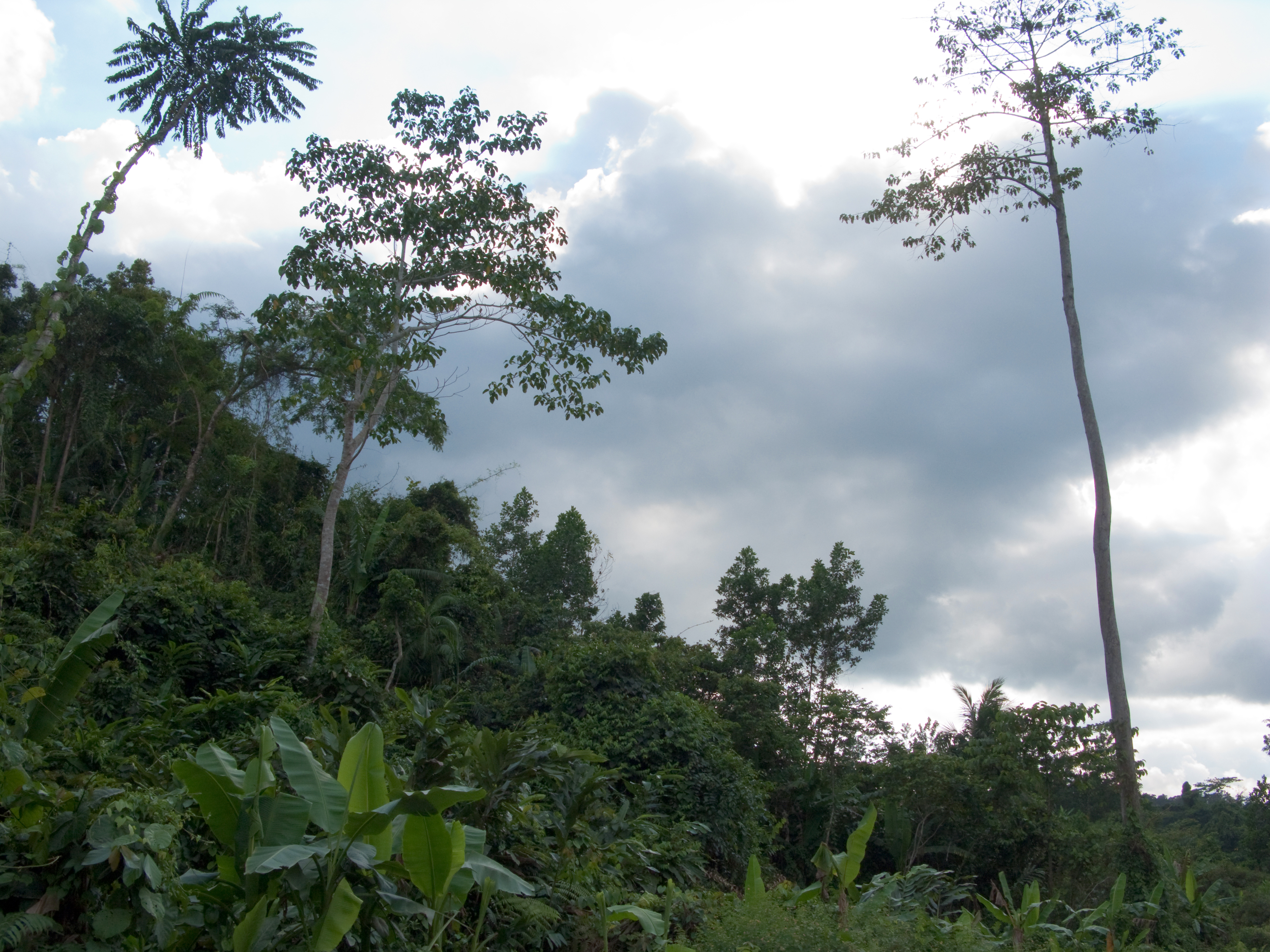
Lush vegetation in a forest in Palawan

The flora of the Philippines comprises a diverse array of plant species, owing to the country's location within the Malesian biogeographical region. The Malesian phytogeographic zone is considered one of the major centers of plant diversity because of the large number and variation of species found there. The Philippine archipelago is geographically isolated by both continental shelves and deep ocean trenches.

At least one-third of the more than 9,250 vascular plant species native to the country are endemic. However, no plant families are known to be endemic to the Philippines. The families of gingers, begonias, gesneriads, orchids, pandans, palms, and dipterocarps have particularly high numbers of endemic species. For instance, about two-thirds of the 150 palm species found in the country occur nowhere else in the world. More than 137 genera and about 998 species of orchids have been recorded in the Philippines as of 2007.

The broad lowland and hill rainforests of the Philippines, most of which have been lost, were once dominated by at least 45 species of dipterocarps. These large trees were common up to about 1,000 meters above sea level. Since dipterocarps originated in India and Malaysia, their presence in the Philippines indicates a historical biogeographical connection with western Malaysia. Other important tree species include giant figs, which provide food for fruit bats, parrots, and monkeys, and Pterocarpus indicus, which, like dipterocarps, is valued for its timber.

Due to ongoing environmental changes, the discovery and documentation of new species has become increasingly important for maintaining an accurate record of the archipelago's flora and fauna.

Several species of Rafflesia occur in the Philippines, including Rafflesia philippensis.

== List ==
=== Native ===
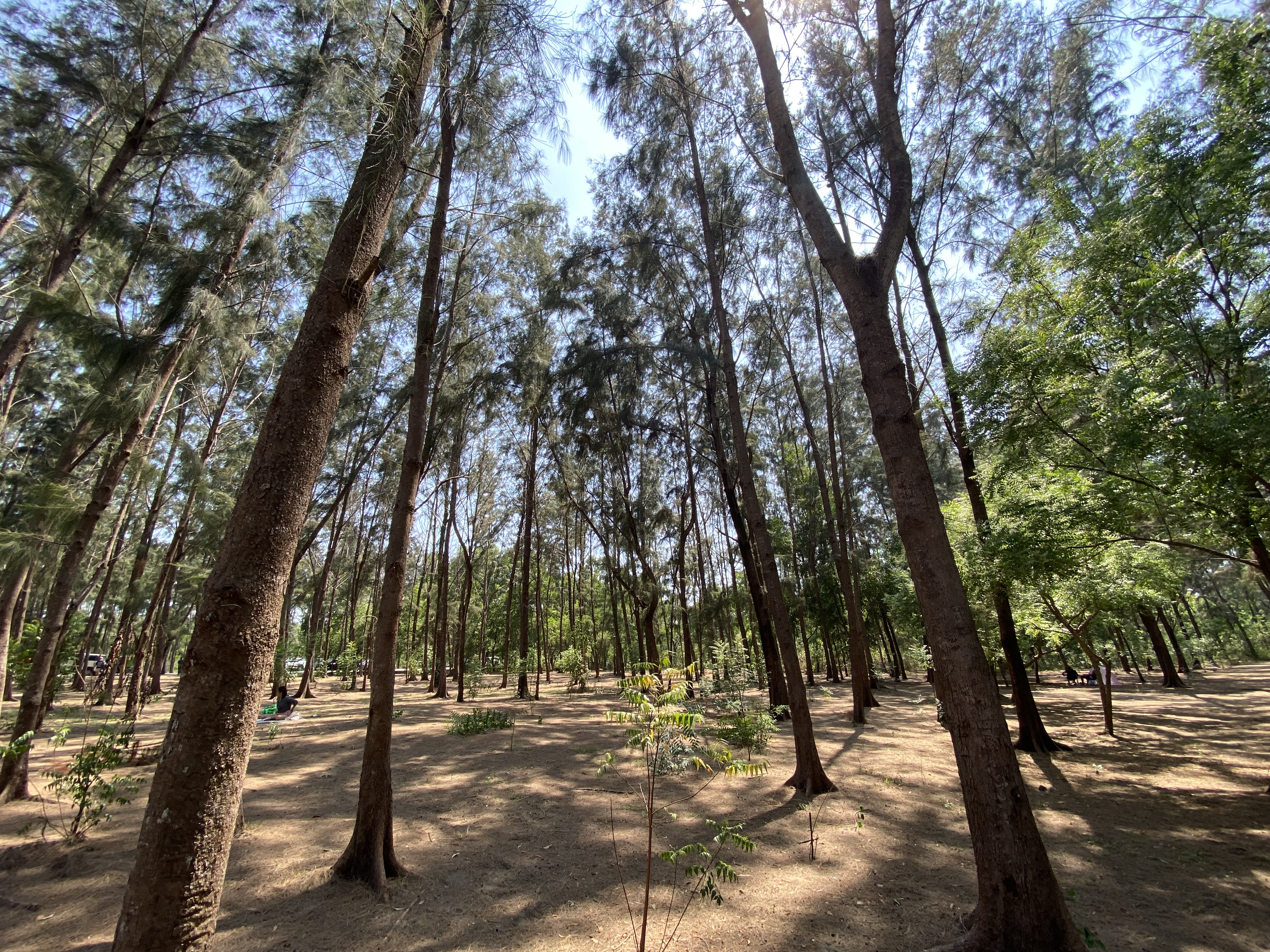
Agoho (Casuarina equisetifolia) trees at the Agoo-Damortis Protected Landscape and Seascape

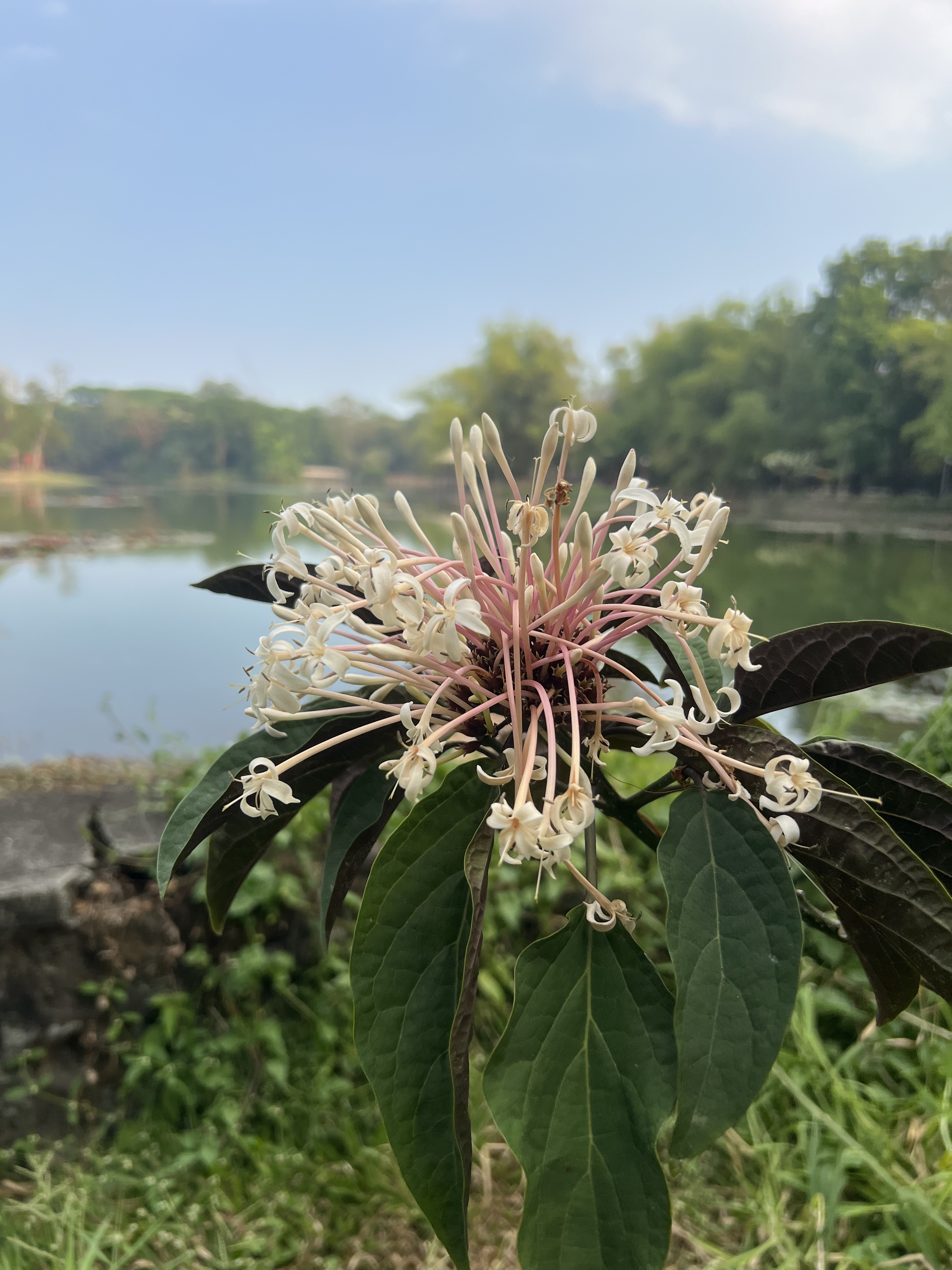
Bagawak-morado (Clerodendrum quadriloculare) at the Ninoy Aquino Parks and Wildlife Center

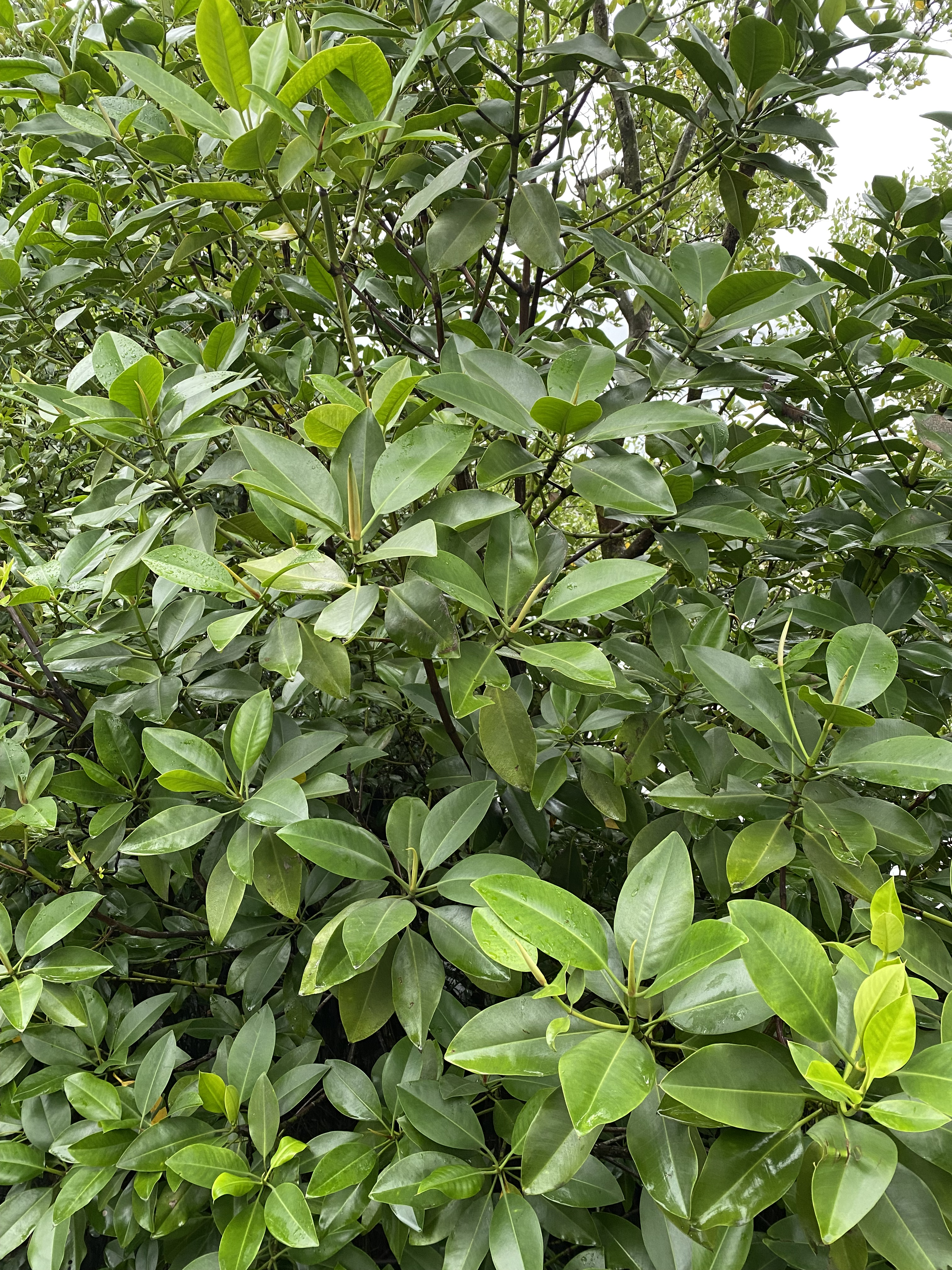
Bakauan babae (Rhizophora mucronata) at the Iloilo River Esplanade

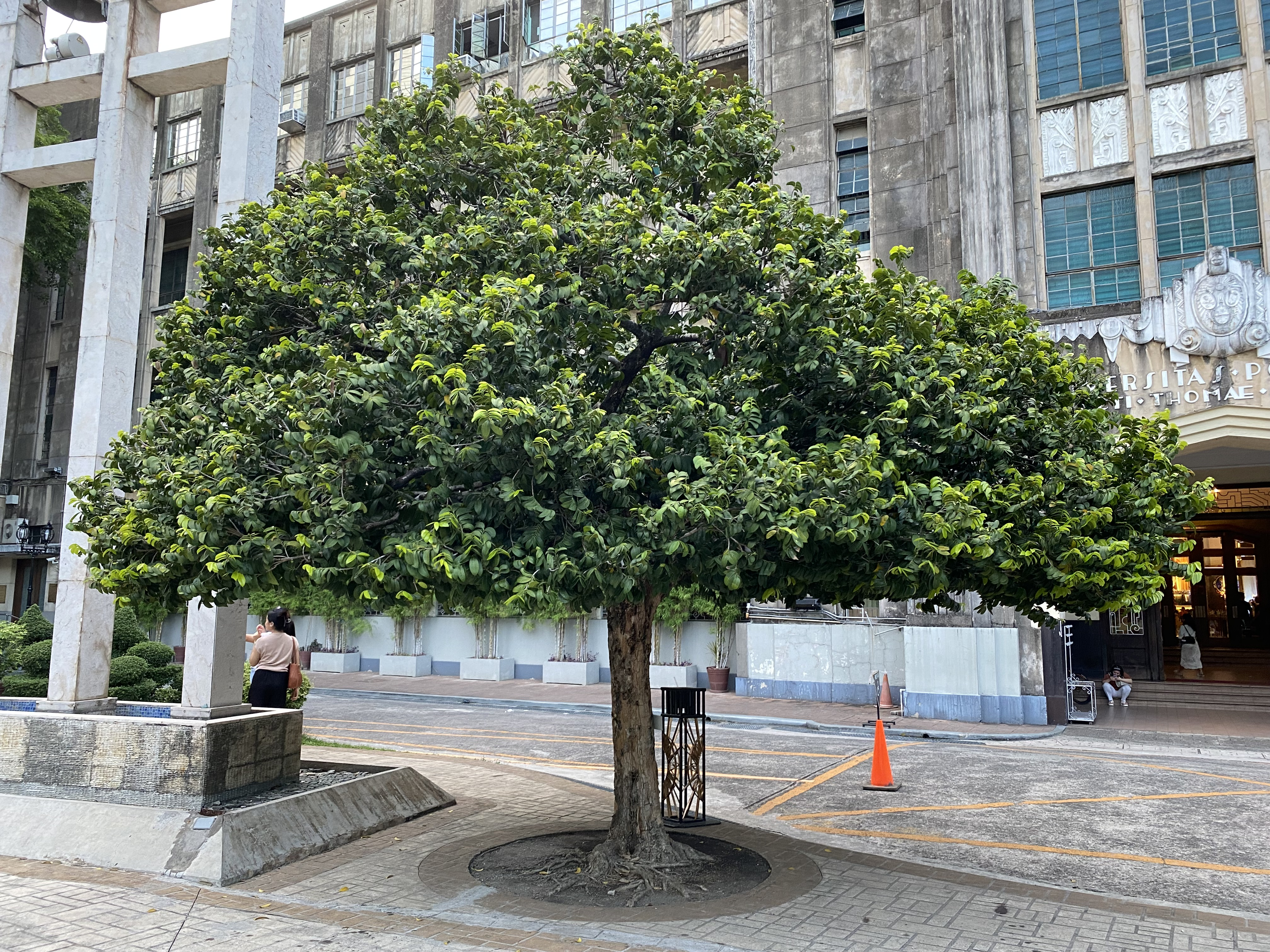
Gakakan (Drypetes falcata) at the University of Santo Tomas campus

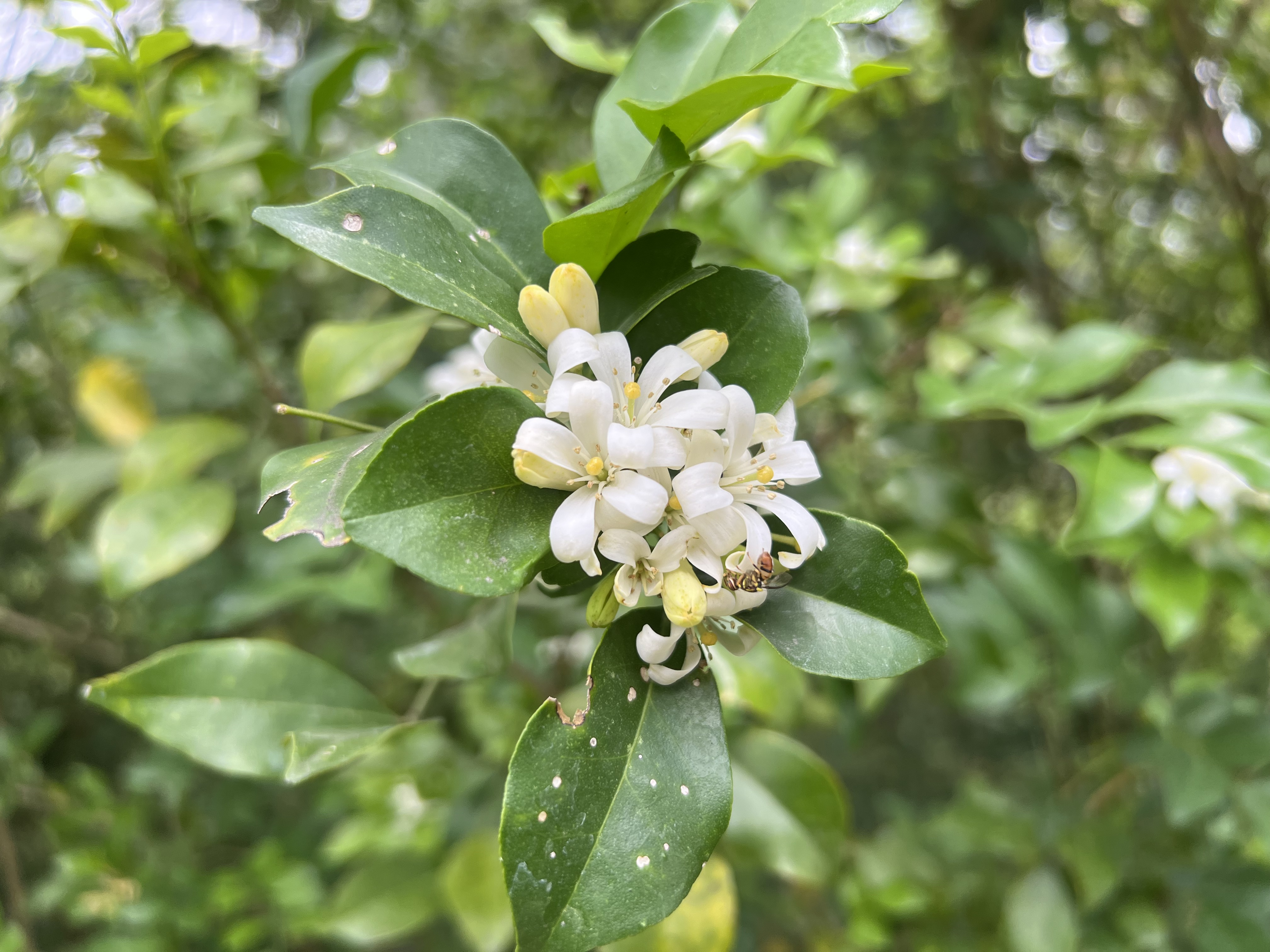
Kamuning (Murraya paniculata) flowers and foliage

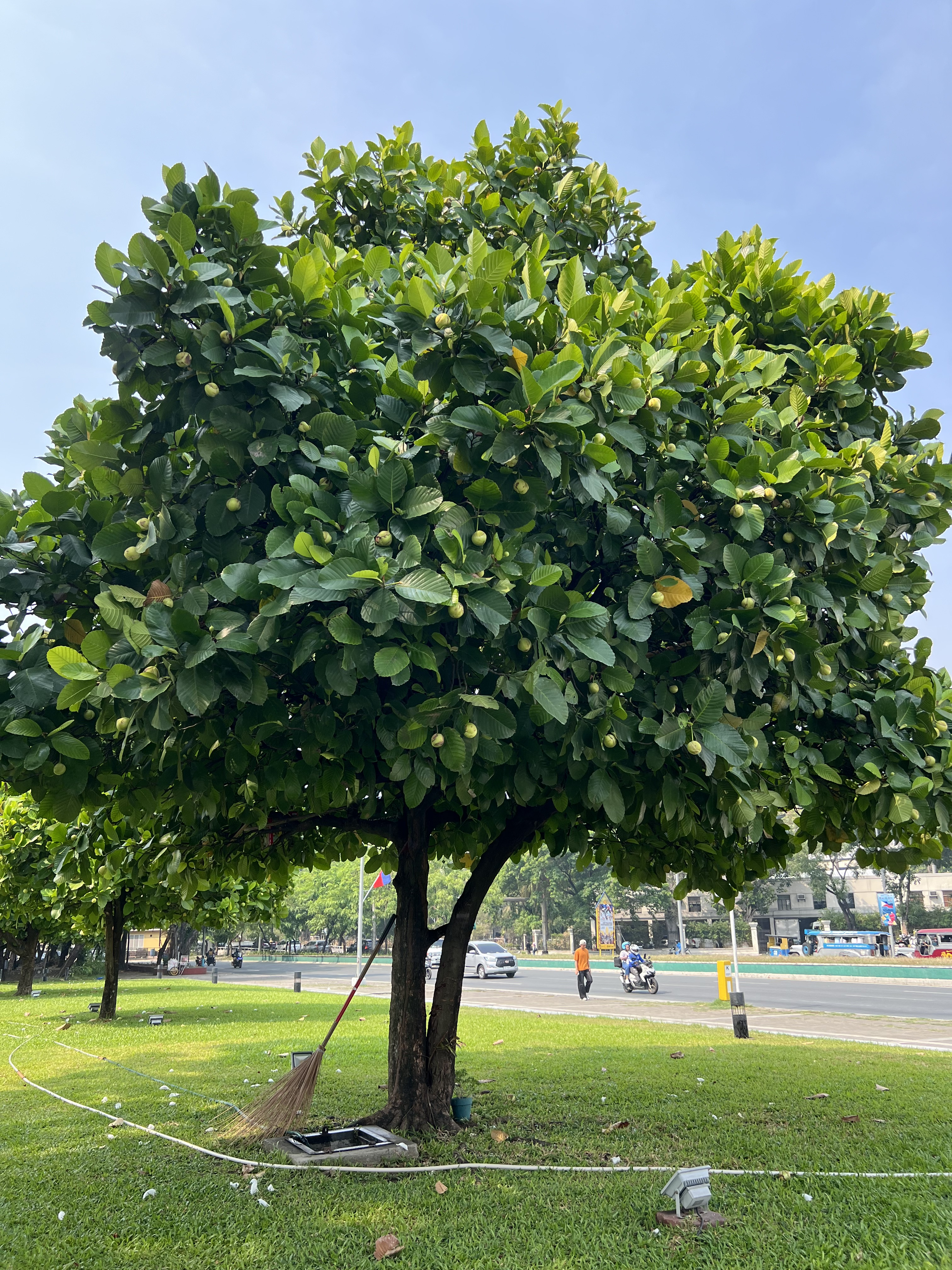
Katmon (Dillenia philippinensis) tree near the Gomburza Monument

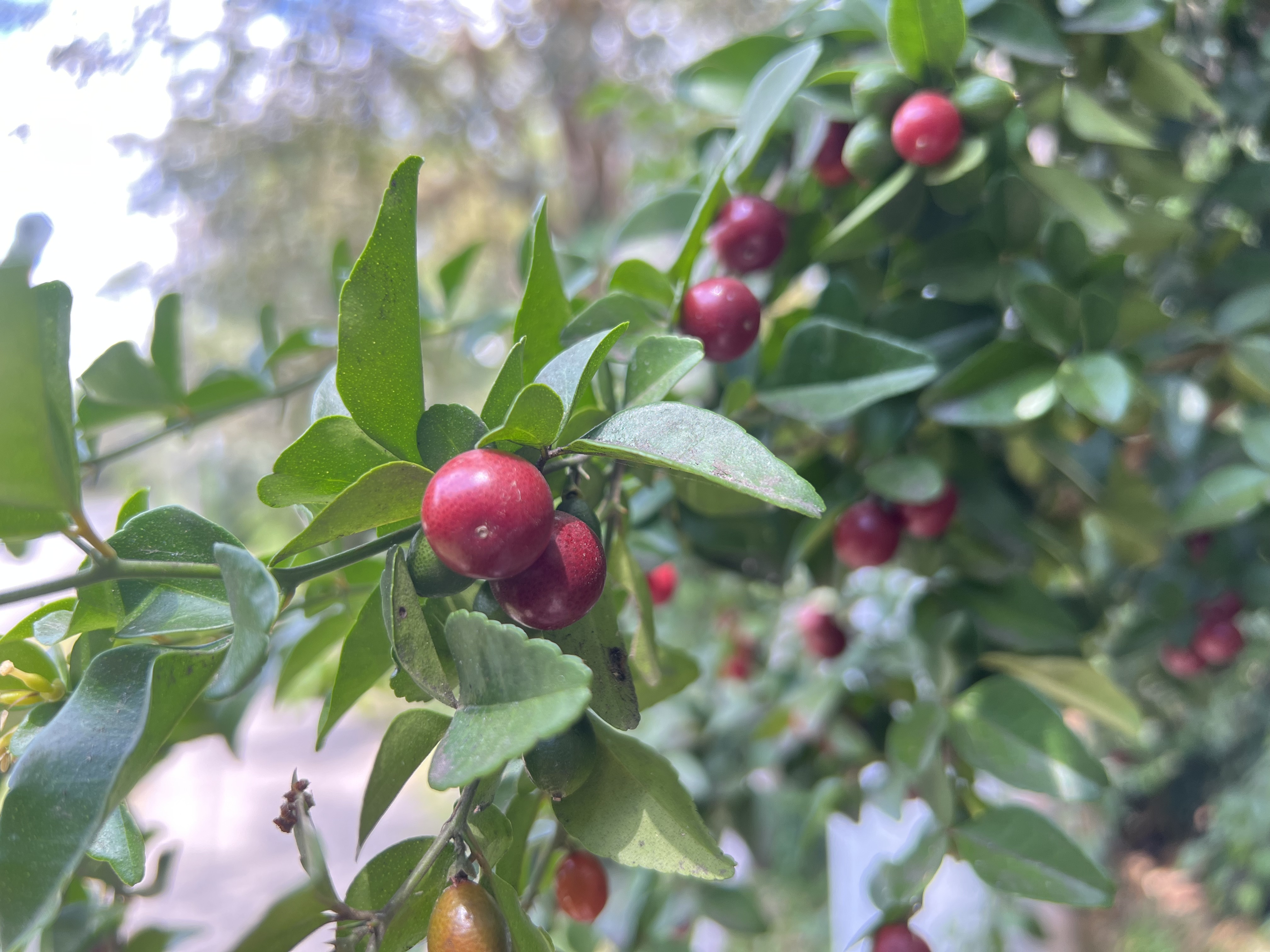
Limonsito (Triphasia trifolia) fruits

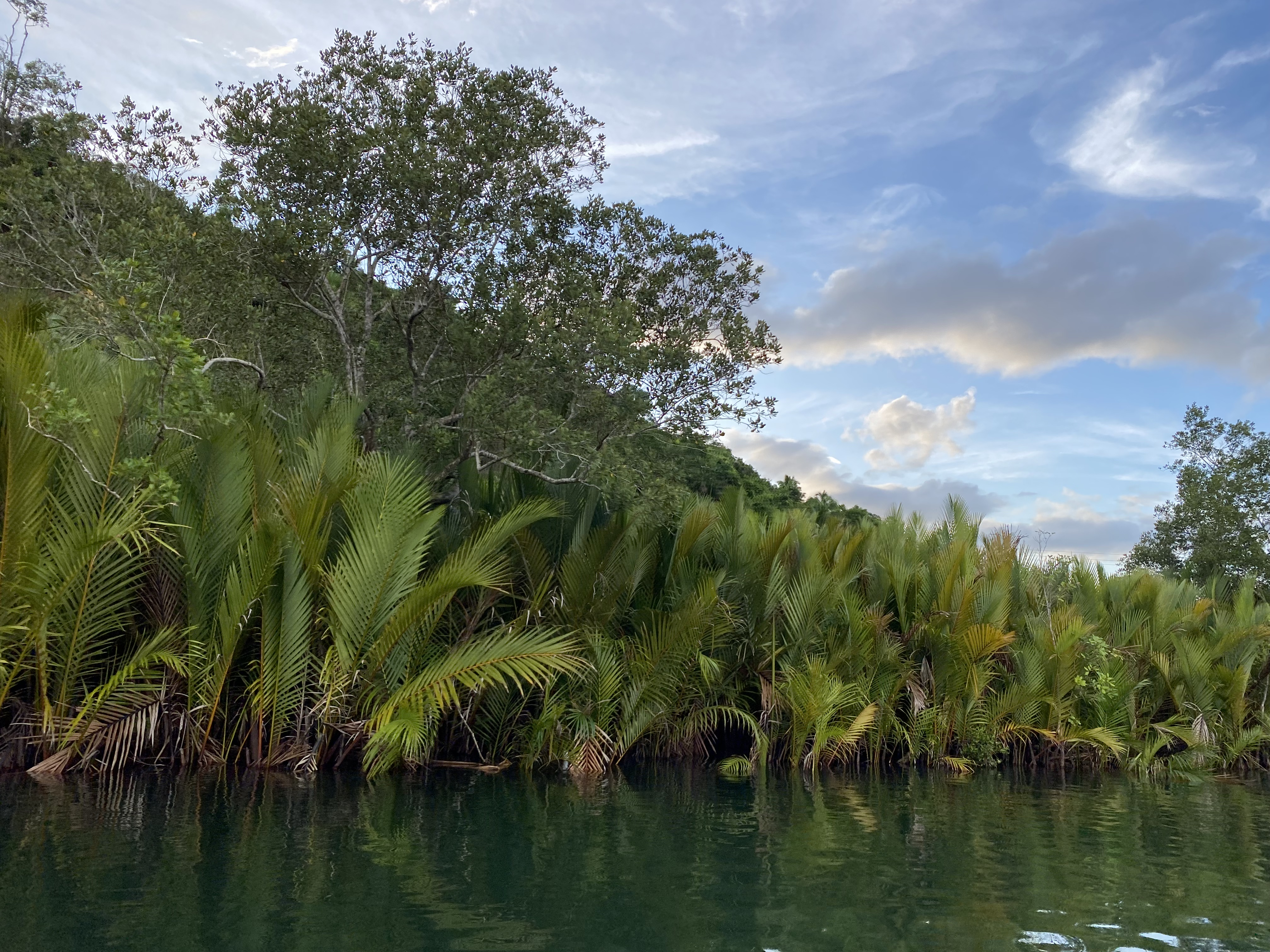
Nipa (Nypa fruticans) at the Abatan River in Maribojoc, Bohol

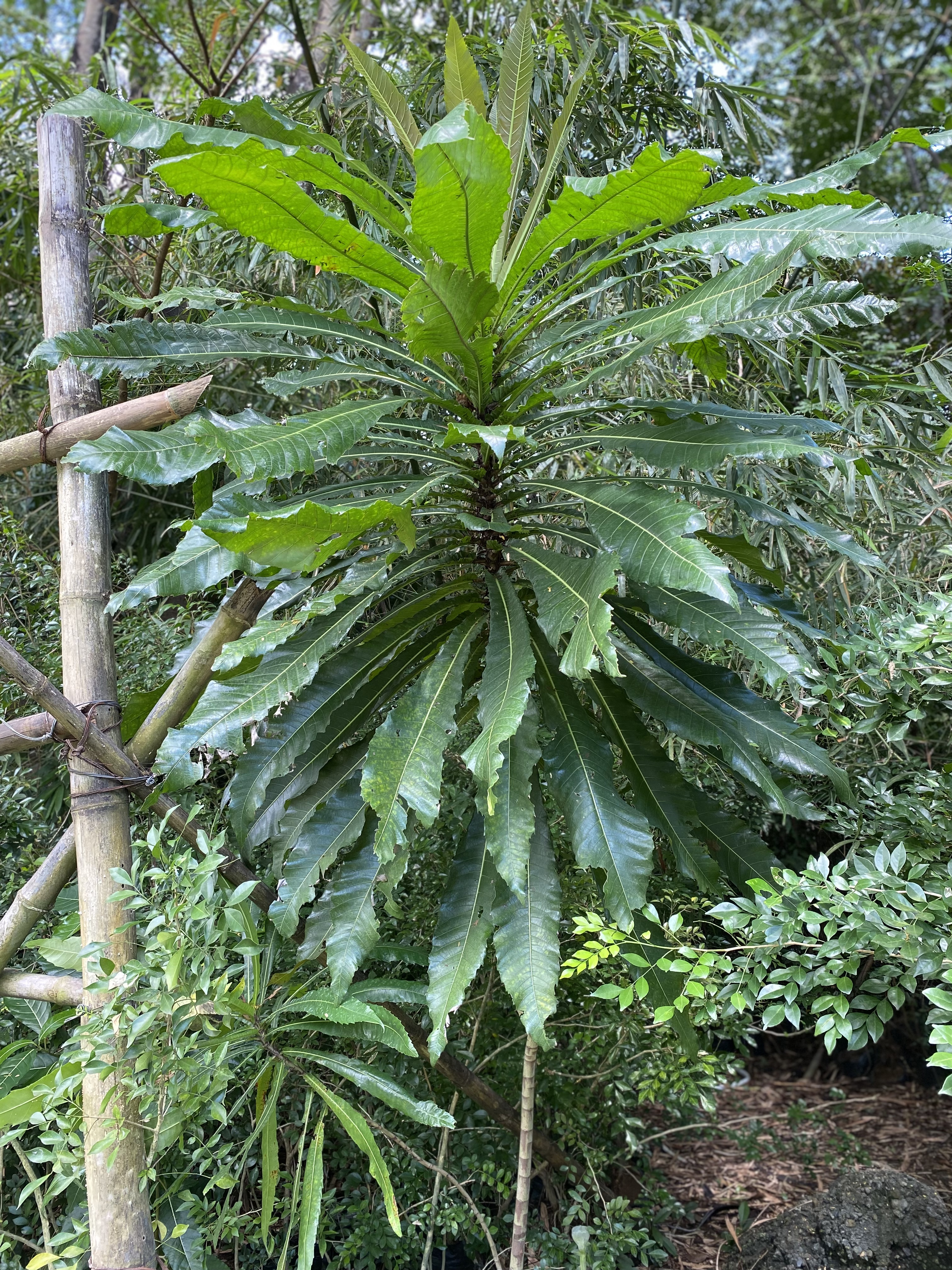
Niyog-niyogan (Ficus pseudopalma)

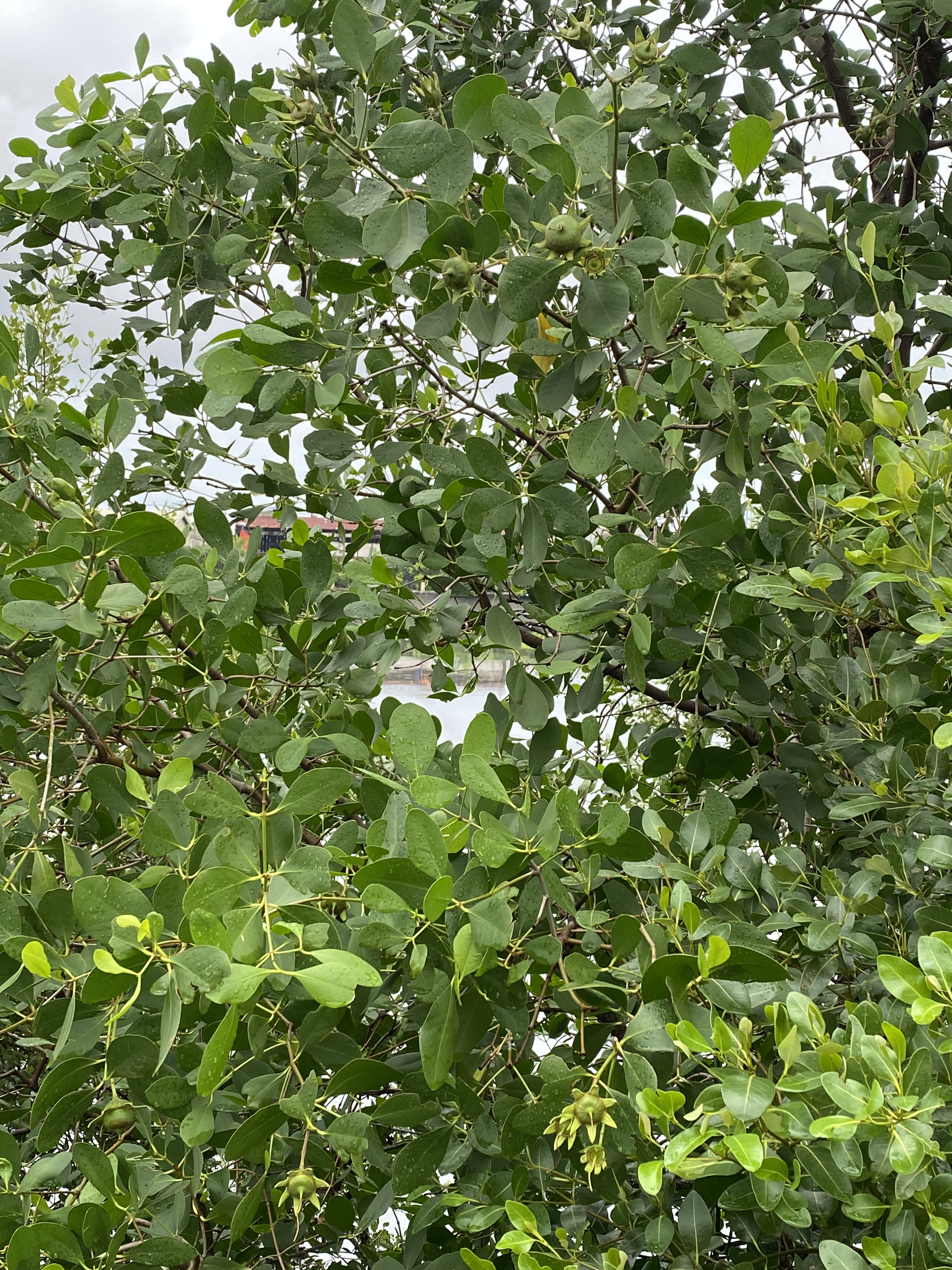
Pagatpat (Sonneratia alba) at the Iloilo River Esplanade

- Abaca – Musa textilis
- Agoho – Casuarina equisetifolia
- Agpoi / Banot - Phanera integrifolia
- Ahern's Balok – Millettia ahernii
- Akleng Butarek – Albizia butarek
- Akleng gubat – Albizia acle
- Akleng parang – Albizia procera
- Alagao – Premma odorata
- Alibangbang – Bauhinia malabarica / Piliostigma malabaricum
- Alim – Melanolepis multiglandulosa
- Alingaro – Elaeagnus triflora
- Albutra – Arcangelisia flava
- Alugbati – Basella alba
- Almaciga – Agathis philippinensis
- Almon – Shorea almon
- Alupag – Litchi chinensis ssp. philippinensis / Dimocarpus malesianus
- Amugis / Dangila – Koordersiodendron pinnatum
- Amuyong – Goniothalamus amuyon
- Anabiong – Trema orientale
- Anahaw – Saribus rotundifolius
- Anang – Diospyros pyrrhocarpa
- Anilao – Colona serratifolia
- Anonang – Cordia dichotoma
- Antipolo – Artocarpus blancoi
- Anubing – Artocarpus ovatus
- Apat-apat – Marsilea crenata
- Apatot / Noni – Morinda citrifolia
- Api-api – Avicennia alba
- Apitong – Dipterocarpus grandiflorus
- Apunan - Diospyros cauliflora
- Ata-ata - Diospyros mindanaensis
- Attenborough's pitcher plant – Nepenthes attenboroughii
- Ayangile – Acacia confusa
- Ayusip - Vacciniium myrtoides
- Badiang – Alocacia indica
- Bagakay - Schizostachyum lima
- Bagalunga – Melia dubia
- Bagawak morado – Clerodendum quadriloculare
- Bago / Culiat – Gnetum gnemon
- Bagoadlau - Xanthostemon philippinensis
- Bagtikan – Parashorea malaanonan
- Bagras – Eucalyptus deglupta
- Bagtikan - Palashorea malaaanonan
- Baguilumbang – Reutealis trisperma
- Bahai – Ormosia calavensis
- Bakauan (babae) – Rhizophora mucronata
- Bakauan (lalaki) – Rhizophora apiculata
- Bakauan-gubat – Carallia brachiata
- Bakong / Taboan - Pandanus dubius
- Balakat /Talanay – Ziziphus talanae
- Balakat-gubat - Balakata luzonica (Sapium luzonicum)
- Balat-buwaya - Utania volubilis
- Balete – Ficus balete
- Balimbing – Averrhoa carambola
- Balinghasai – Buchanania arborescens
- Balitbitan – Cynometra ramiflora
- Balobo – Diplodiscus paniculatus
- Bamban - Donax canniformis
- Banaba – Lagerstroemia speciosa
- Banai-banai – Radermachera pinnata
- Banana – Musa spp.
- Banato – Mallotus philippensis
- Banga / Tiger palm - Pinanga maculata
- Bangkal – Nauclea orientalis
- Bani – Pongamia pinnata / Millettia pinnata
- Banilad - Sterculia ceramica
- Baniti - Garcinia dulcis
- Bantigue – Pemphis acidula
- Bantolinau – Diospyros ferrea
- Banuyo – Wallaceodendron celebicum
- Baraibai – Cerebra manghas
- Batikuling – Litsea leytensis
- Batete - Kingiodendron alternifolium
- Batino – Alstonia macrophylla
- Batwan – Garcinia binucao
- Bayag-usa – Voacanga globosa
- Bayanti - Aglaia rimosa
- Bayok – Pterospermum diversifolium
- Bayuno / Mangga wani – Mangifera caesia
- Benguet pine – Pinus kesiya
- Betis – Madhuca betis
- Biasong - Citrus hystrix var. micrantha
- Biga – Alocasia macrorrhizos
- Bignai – Antidesma bunius
- Bignay kalabaw – Antidesma pleuricum
- Binoloan - Syzygium acuminatissimum
- Binuang – Octomeles sumatrana
- Binunga – Macaranga tanarius
- Binungang-malapad – Macaranga grandifolia
- Binayuyo – Antidesma ghaesembilla
- Bird's nest fern – Asplenium nidus
- Bitaog – Calophyllum inophyllum
- Bitongol – Flacourtia indica
- Black pepper – Piper nigrum
- Bogo - Garuga floribunda
- Bolon – Platymitra arborea
- Bolong-eta – Diospyros pilosanthera
- Botolan - Flueggea virosa
- Botong – Barringtonia asiatica
- Broad-winged apitong – Dipterocarpus kunstleri
- Bukawe - Cyrtochloa toppingii
- Bulala – Nephelium chryseum
- Bulalakaw - Hoya multiflora
- Bunga / Betel nut – Areca catechu
- Bungang-dakigan / Elmer's palm - Pinanga philippinensis
- Buri – Corypha utan
- Bunga de Jolo / Manila palm – Adonidia merrilli
- Cabuyao - Citrus hystrix
- Calamansi – Citrofortunella microcarpa
- Camansi – Artocarpus camansi
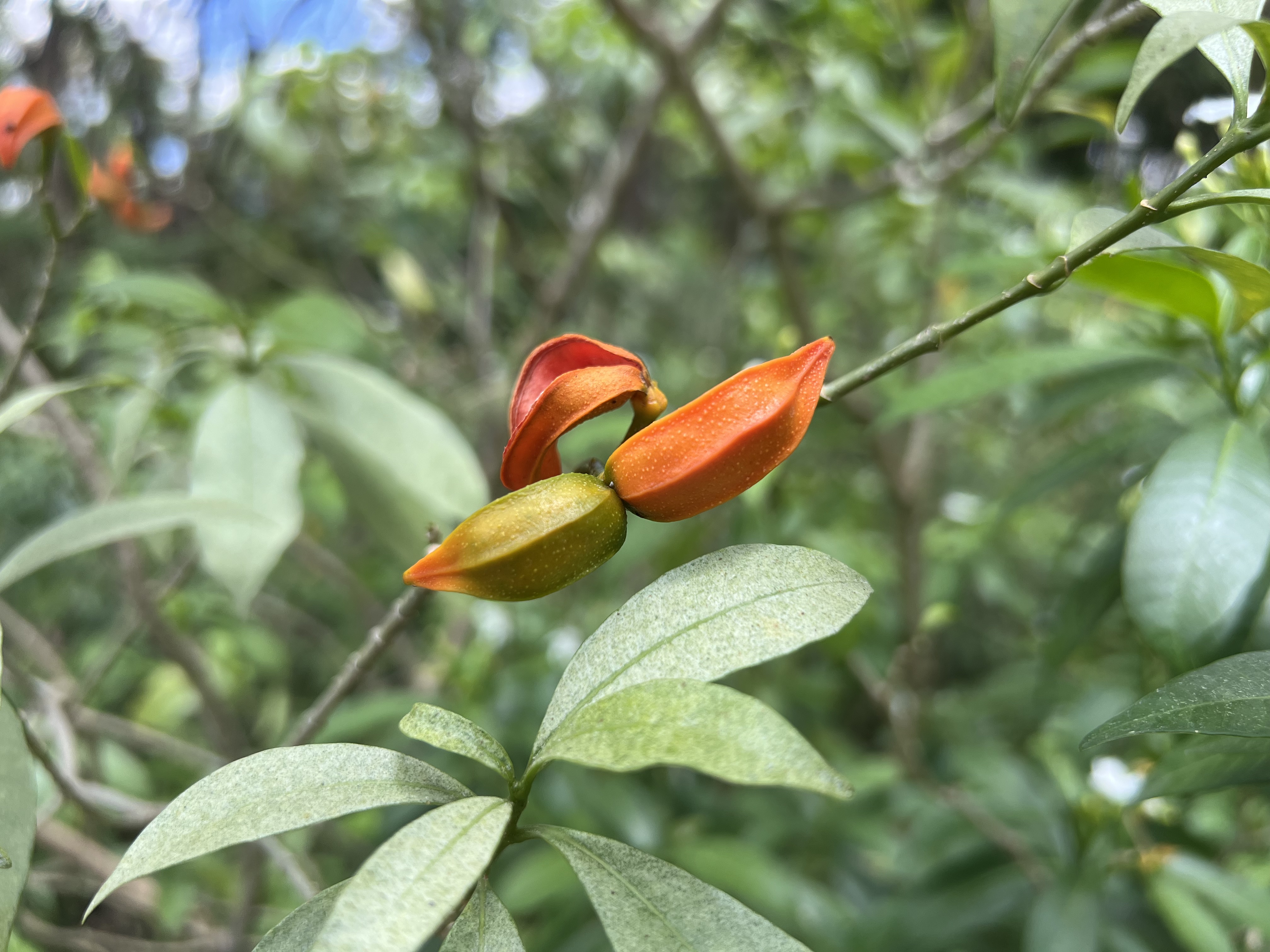
- Pandakaki (Tabernaemontana pandacaqui) fruits
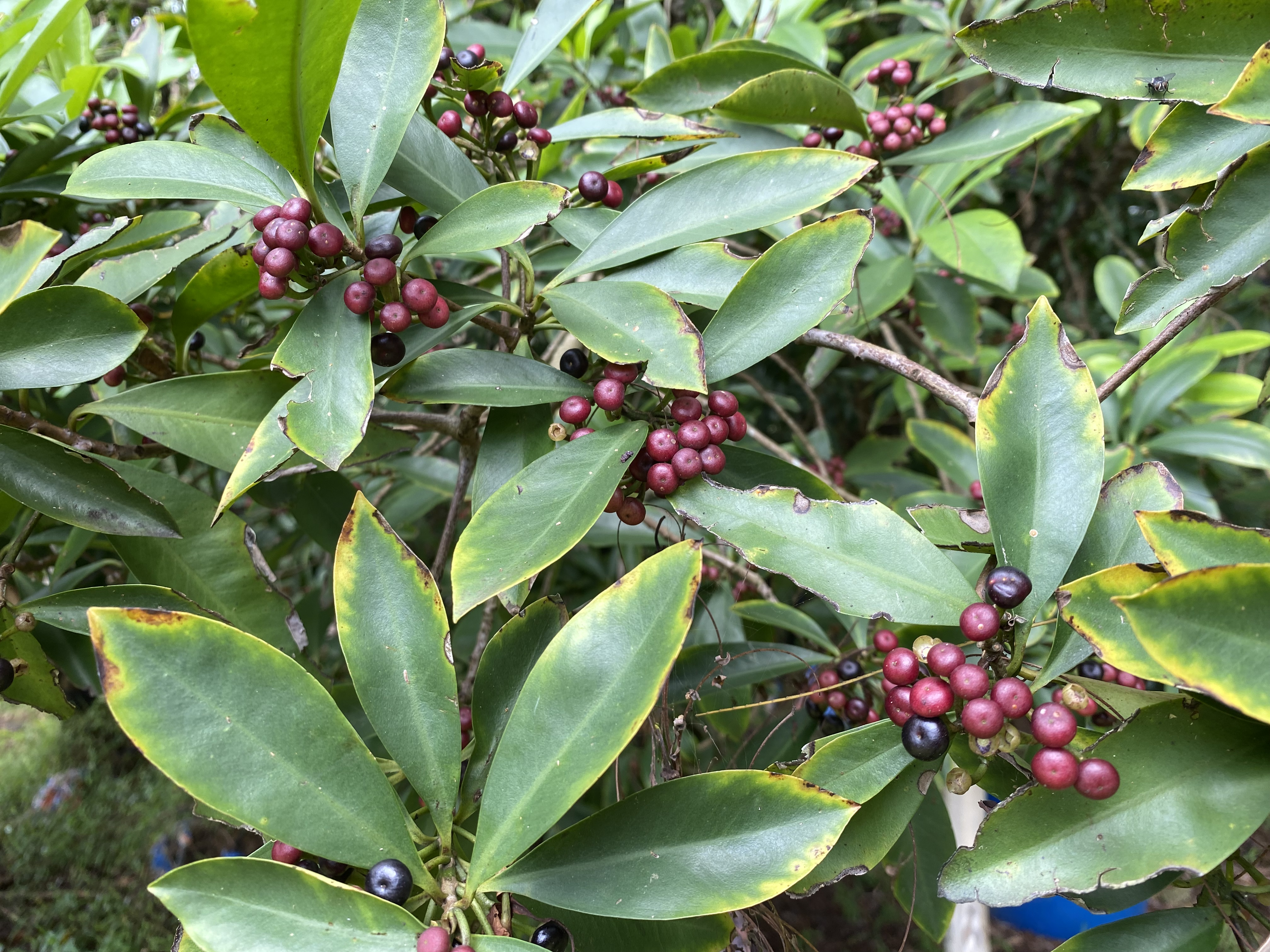
  Tagpo (Ardisia squamulosa) tree with fruits
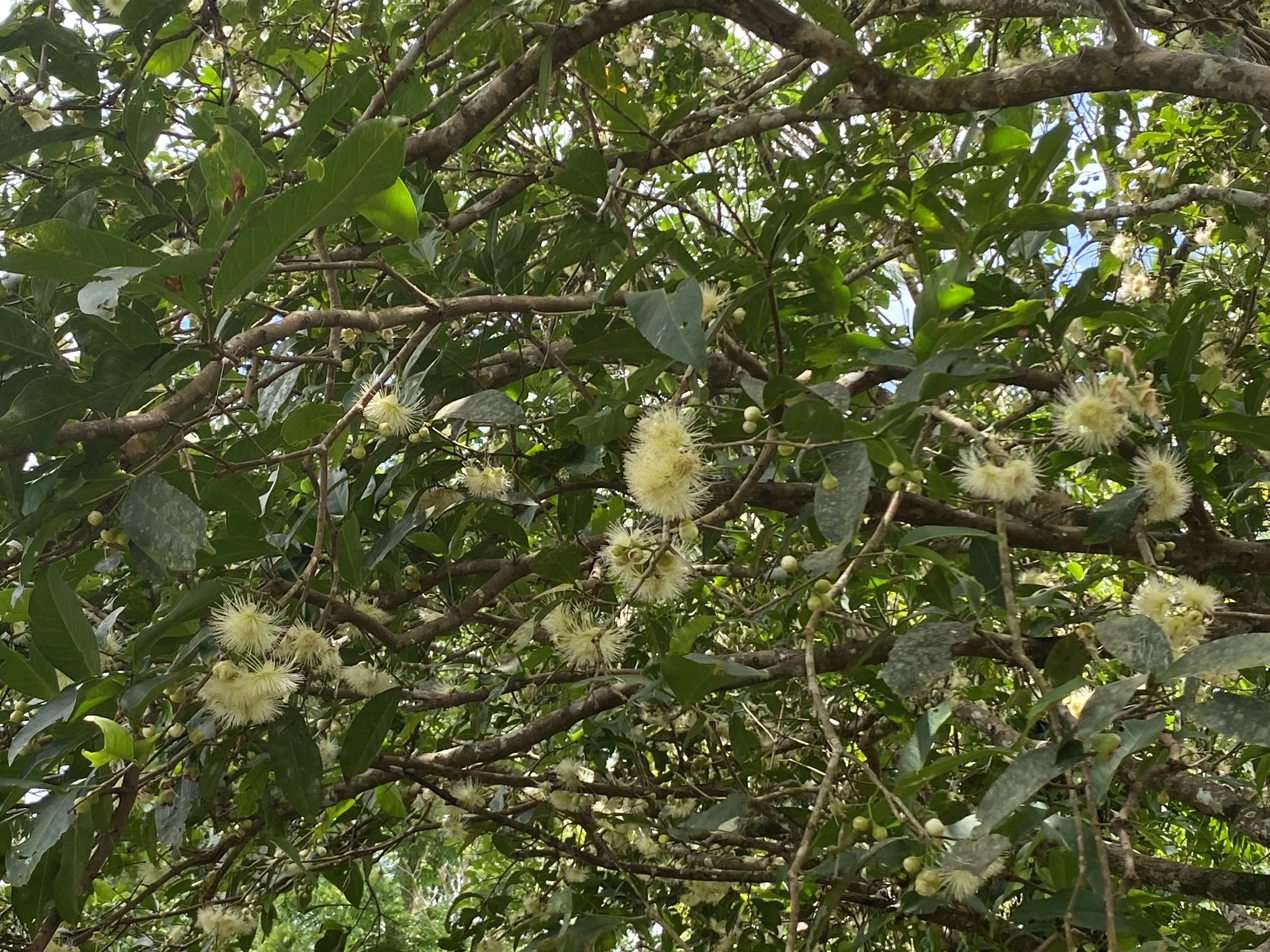
  Tambis (Syzygium aqueum) branch
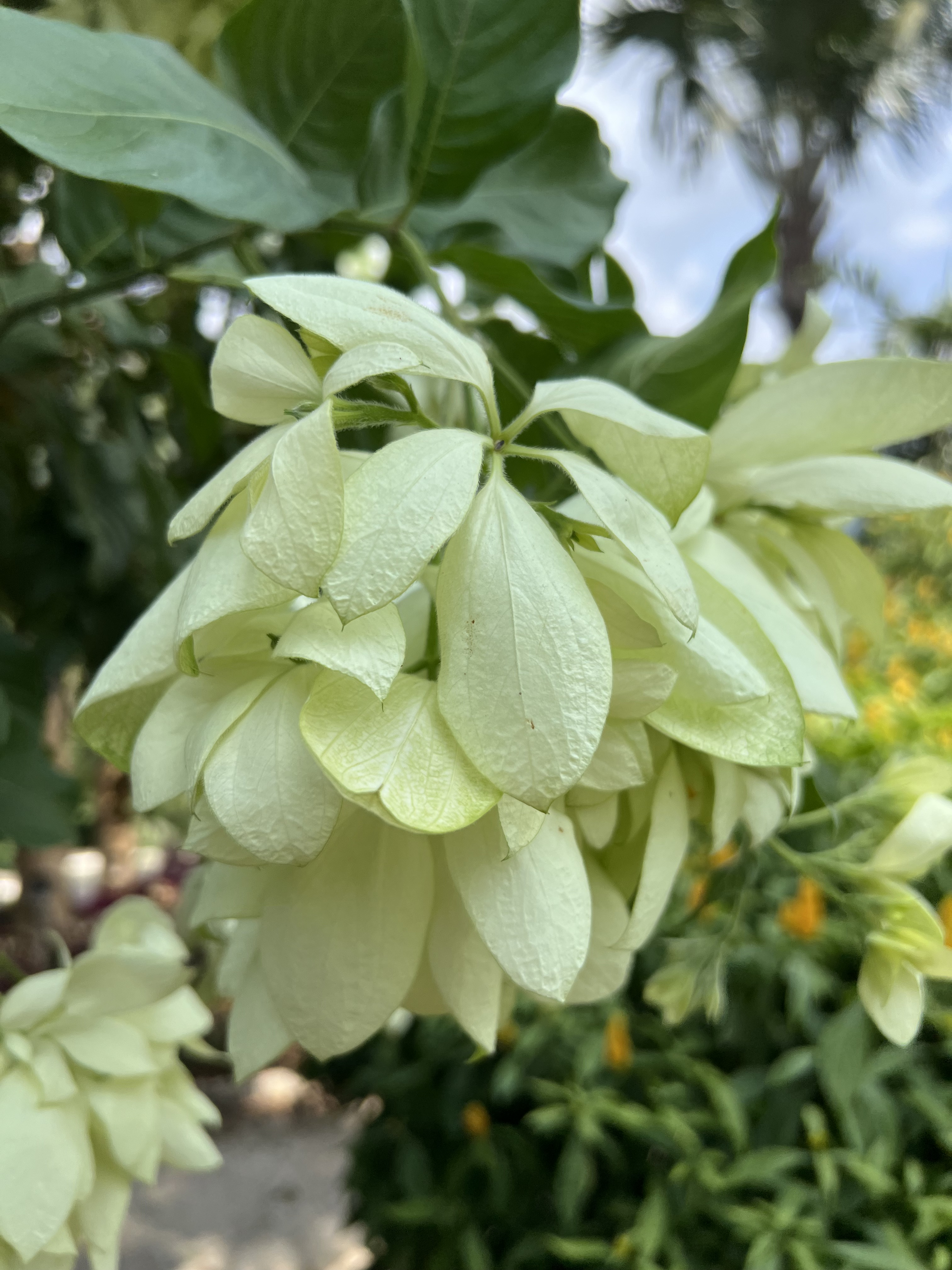
  Mussaenda philippica "Doña Aurora"
  Champaca - Magnolia champaca
- Cogon - Imperata cylindrica
- Dadiangas – Gmelina elliptica
- Dalingdingan - Hopea foxworthyi
- Damong Bingkalat / Little Tree - Biophytum sensitivum
- Dampalit – Sesuvium portulacastrum
- Dangkalan – Calophyllum obliquinervium
- Dao – Dracontomelon dao
- Dapdap – Erythrina variegata
- Dapong repolyo – Platycerium grande
- Dayapod mabolo - Rhodomyrtus tomentosa
- Digeg / Kandong – Memecylon lanceolatum
- Dilap - Doryxylon spinosum
- Dilaw – Cucurma longa
- Diliman – Stenochlaena palustris
- Dita – Alstonia scholaris
- Dolitan – Planchonella villamilii
- Donya aurora – Mussaenda philippica
- Duhat – Syzygium cumini
- Duguan – Myristica philippinensis
- Dungon – Heritiera sylvatica
- Dungon-late – Heritiera littoralis
- Durian – Durio zebithenus
- Foxtail orchid - Rhynchostylis retusa
- Gabi – Colacacia esculentum
- Gabing tigre - Alocasia zebrina
- Gakakan – Drypetes falcata
- Galo / Aluloy – Anacolosa frutescens
- Ginger – Zingiber officinale
- Gisok-gisok - Hopea philippinensis
- Golden Gardenia - Gardenia mutabilis
- Guijo – Shorea guiso
- Gugo – Entada phaseoloides
- Gumamela – Hibiscus rosa-sinensis
- Gumayaka - Arenga tremula
- Gumihan – Artocarpus sericicarpus
- Hagakhak – Dipterocarpus validus
- Hagimit – Ficus minahassae
- Hagis – Syzygium tripinnatum
- Hairy-leafed Apitong – Dipterocarpus alatus
- Hauili – Ficus septica
- Hasselt's Panau - Dipterocarpus hasselltii
- Himbaba-o – Broussonetia luzonica
- Igem – Dacrycarpus imbricatus
- Igem-dagat – Podocarpus costalis
- Igyo – Dysoxylum gaudichadianum
- Ikmo – Piper betle
- Iloilo – Aglaia argentea
- Ipil – Intsia bijuga
- Is-is – Ficus ulmifolia
- Itom-itom – Diospyros longiciliata
- JC's vine – Strongylodon juangonzalezii
- Kabiki - Mimusops elengi
- Kaladis Narig - Vatica elliptica
- Kalamansanay / Malakalumpit – Terminalia calamansanai
- Kalamansi – Citrus x microcarpa
- Kalibaian – Heynea trijuga
- Kalimatas – Phaeanthus ebracteolatus
- Kalingag – Cinnamomum mercadoi
- Kalantas – Toona calantas
- Kalios – Streblus asper
- Kalubkob - Syzygium calubcob
- Kalumpang – Sterculia foetida
- Kalumpit – Terminalia microcarpa
- Kalunti - Shorea hopeifolia
- Kamagong – Diospyros blancoi
- Kamantigi – Impatiens balsamina
- Kamantigi-gubat – Impatiens platypetala
- Kamatog - Sympetalandra densiflora
- Kamias – Averrhoa bilimbi
- Kaningag – Cinnamomum cebuense
- Kanining-peneras - Aglaia pyriformis
- Kapal-kapal baging - Hoya pubicalyx
- Katmon – Dillenia philippinensis
- Katmon bayani - Dillenia megalantha
- Katong-matsing – Chisocheton pentandrus
- Kamuning – Murraya paniculata
- Kaong – Arenga pinnata
- Kapa-kapa – Medinilla magnifica
- Kapulasan – Nephelium ramboutan-ake
- Karagumoy - Pandanus simplex
- Karaksan – Chionanthus ramiflorus
- Karutai / Katuday – Sesbania grandiflora
- Kawayang tinik – Bambusa spinosa
- Kayumanis – Clausena anisum-olens
- Kris plant – Alocasia sanderiana
- Kubili – Cubilia cubili
- Kupang – Parkia timoriana
- Lagundi – Vitex negundo
- Lagunding dagat – Vitex trifolia
- Langka – Artocarpus heterophylla
- Lamio – Dracontomelon edule
- Lamog - Planchonia spectabilis
- Lanete – Wrightia pubescens
- Lanutan - Mitrephora lanotan
- Lanzones – Lansium domesticum
- Lauan (Red) – Shorea negrosensis
- Lauan (White) – Shorea contorta
- Libas – Spondias pinnata
- Libato - Lumnitzera littorea
- Ligas - Semecarpus cuneiformis
- Lila-lilahan – Hibiscus radiatus
- Limonsito - Triphasia trifolia
- Lingo-Lingo – Viticipremna philippinensis
- Lipa / Lipang kalabaw – Dendrocnide meyeniana
- Lipote – Syzygium curranii / Syzygium polycephaloides
- Lirio – Crinum latifoliumCrinum latifolium
- Litlit - Piper retrofractum
- Liusin – Maranthes corymbosa
- Longan – Dimocarpus longan
- Luag – Clerodendrum klemmei
- Lubang - Podocarpus pilgeri
- Lumanai / Mayagos - Homonoia riparia
- Lumbang – Aleurites moluccana
- Lunas kahoy - Micromelum minutum
- Lupo-lupo – Achyranthes aspera
- Luya-luyahan – Curcuma zeodaria
- Magabuyo – Celtis luzonica
- Maiden's jealousy - Tristellateia australasiae
- Makabuhay – Tinospora rumphii
- Makaasim – Syzygium nitidum
- Makopa – Syzygium malaccense
- Mala- Elaeocarpus grandiflorus
- Malaabukado – Litsea cordata
- Malabagang – Glochindion album
- Malabago – Hibiscus tiliaceus
- Malabaltik – Syzygium affine
- Malabayabas - Tristaniopsis decorticata
- Malabulak – Bombax ceiba
- Malak-malak - Palaquium philippense
- Malakatmon - Dillenia luzonienses
- Malagaitmon - Diospyros curranii
- Malaikmo – Celtis philippinensis
- Malak-malak – Palaquim philippense
- Malapanau - Dipterocarpus kerrii
- Malanangka – Parartocarpus venonosus
- Malapapaya – Polyscias nodosa
- Malaputat - Terminalia darlingii
- Malasaging - Aglaia edulis
- Malatinta – Diospyros maritima
- Malatungaw - Melastoma malabatricum
- Malayakal - Shorea seminis
- Mali-Mali – Leea manillensis
- Malinoag - Diospyros brideliifolia
- Malunggay – Moringa oleifera
- Makopa – Syzygium samarangense
- Mamalis – Pittosporum pentandrum
- Manaog ka irog – Dischidia oiantha
- Mangga – Mangifera indica
- Manggachapui - Hopea acuminata
- Manggis - Koompassia excelsa
- Mangkono – Xanthostemon verdugonianus
- Mapilig – Xanthostemon bracteatus
- Marang – Artocarpus odoratissimus
- Marang laparan – Litsea grandis
- Matang-kuwaw - Clerodendrum japonicum
- Mayana – Coleus scutellarioides
- Mayapis – Shorea palosapis
- Miagos - Osmoxylon lineare
- Mindanao cinnamon – Cinnamomum mindanaense
- Mindanao narek - Hopea brachyptera
- Mindanao narig - Vatica mindanensis
- Mindanao palosapis - Anisoptera costata
- Molave – Vitex parviflora
- Narek - Hopea cagayanensis
- Narig - Vatica mangachapoi ssp. mangachapoi
- Narig-laot - Vatica maritima
- Narra / Philippine cedar – Pterocarpus indicus
- Nito - Lygodium sp.
- Niyog – Cocos nucifera
- Niyog-niyogan – Ficus psedopalma
- Nipa – Nypa fruticans
- Oliva – Cycas revoluta
- O-oi - Diospyros philippinensis
- Orchid – Phalaenopsis hieroglyphica
- Pagatpat – Sonneratia alba
- Pagsangihin / Elemi / Piling-liitan – Canarium luzonicum
- Pagsahingin-bulog / Salung – Canarium asperum
- Paguringon / Kansilay – Cratoxylum sumatranum
- Pahutan – Mangifera alitssima
- Pako - Diplazium esculentum
- Pakpak lawin – Drynaria quercifolia
- Palasan – Calamus merrillii
- Palaspas – Dacryodes rostrata
- Palawan mangkono - Xanthostemon speciosus
- Palisan / Dalakit - Aquilaria cumingiana
- Palosapis / Mayapis – Anisoptera thurifera
- Pamitoyen – Calophyllum pentapetalum
- Panalipan – Diospyros tenuipes
- Panao - Dipterocarpus gracilis
- Pandan – Pandanus amaryllifolius, Pandanus odorifer
- Pangapang – Vaccinium gitingense
- Pangnan - Lithocarpus sulitii
- Pansit-pansitan – Peperomia pellucida
- Patalsik-pula – Decaspermum blancoi
- Patolang-gibat / Katimbau - Trichosanthes quinquangulata
- Pedada – Sonneratia caseolaris
- Philippine Lily – Lilium philippinense
- Philippine teak – Tectona philippinensis
- Pianga - Ganua obovatifolia
- Pili – Canarium ovatum
- Piling liitan – Canarium luzonicum
- Pingka-pingkahan - Oroxylum indicum
- Pinulog - Palaquium mindanaense
- Pitcher plant – Nepenthes copilandii
- Pitogo – Cycas riuminiana / Cycas edentata
- Pomelo – Citrus maxima
- Pototan – Bruguiera cylindrica / Bruguiera sexangula
- Pugahan / Fishtail plant – Caryota rumphiana
- Puso-puso – Actinodaphne multiflorum
- Putat – Barringtonia racemosa
- Quisumbing-gisok - Hopea quisumbingiana
- Rafflesia – Rafflesia arnoldii
- Rambutan – Nephelium lappaceum
- Ramie – Boehmeria nivea
- Rattan – Calamus
- Rarang – Erythrina subumbrans
- Red flame - Strobilanthes reptans
- Red Nato – Palaquium luzoniense
- Rice – Oryza sativa
- Rimas / Breadfruit – Artocarpus altilis
- Sablot – Litsea glutinosa
- Sagmit – Rubus rosifolius
- Sakat – Terminalia nitens
- Salimbagat - Capparis micrantha
- Salingbobog / Balai-lamok – Crateva religiosa
- Salinggogon – Cratoxylum formosum
- Salisi – Ficus benjamina
- Samar-gisok - Hopea samarensis
- Sambong – Blumea balsamifera
- San Francisco / Croton – Codiaeum variegatum
- Sanggumay – Dendrobium anosmum
- Santol – Sandoricum koetjape
- Sapinit – Rubus moluccanus
- Siar – Peltophorum pterocarpum
- Sibuyas – Allium cepa
- Sierra Madre Mangkono - Xanthostemon fruticosus
- Spider lily - Crinum asiaticum
- Supa – Sindora supa
- Taba - Tristaniopsis littoralis
- Tabao – Lumnitzera littorea
- Tabon-tabon – Atuna excelsa subsp. racemosa
- Tabogok - Alsomitra macrocarpa
- Tagbak - Alpinia elegans
- Tagpo – Ardisia squamulosa
- Tagum - Indigofera tinctoria / Indigofera hirsuta
- Talisai – Terminalia catappa
- Talong punay – Datura metel
- Talungon – Gmelina philippensis
- Taluto / Malasapsap – Pterocymbium tinctorium
- Tamayuan – Strombosia philippinensis
- Tambis – Syzygium aqueum
- Tan-ag – Kleinhovia hospita
- Tanaua- Ehretia acuminata
- Tangisang bagyo – Xylopsia densifolia
- Tangisang bayawak – Ficus variegata
- Tanguile – Shorea polysperma
- Tangulo / Rangoon creeper - Combretum indicum
- Tapulao - Pinus merkusii
- Taraw - Livistona saribus
- Tayabak / Jade vine – Strongylodon macrobotrys
- Ti plant – Cordyline fruticosa
- Tiaong - Shorea ovata
- Tibatib – Epipremnum pinnatum
- Tibig – Ficus nota
- Tindalo – Afzelia rhomboidea
- Toog – Petersianthus quadrialatus
- Tsaang gubat – Ehretia microphylla
- Tuai – Bischofia javanica
- Tubili - Derris elliptica
- Tugabang – Corchorus olitorius
- Tui / Tiwi - Dolichandrone spathacea
- Tumolad – Syzygium merrittianum
- Ube – Dioscorea alata
- Urung - Cyrtophyllum fragrans
- Vidal's lanutan – Hibiscus campylosiphon
- Villamil Nato - Pouteria villamillii
- Vuyavuy / Mountain date palm - Phoenix loureiroi
- Waling-waling – Vanda sanderiana
- Water jasmine – Wrightia religiosa
- Yabnob – Horsfieldia costulata
- Yakal – Shorea astylosa
- Yakal-kaliot - Hopea malibato
- Yakal-magasusu - Hopea mindanensis
- Yakal-malibato - Shorea malibato
- Yakal Saplungan – Hopea plagata
- Yakal-yamban - Shorea falciferoides ssp. falciferoides
- Yellow lanutan – Polyalthia flava
- Ylang-ylang – Cananga odorata
- Ylang-ylang (dwarf) – Desmos chinensis
- Yangiyang-hapon - Youngia japonica

=== Introduced/Naturalized ===
- Acacia (Rain tree) – Samanea saman
- Adelfa – Nerium oleander
- Amorseco – Andropogon aciculatus
- Ampalaya / Amargoso – Momordica charantia
- Anonas – Annona reticulata
- Aratiles – Mutingia calabura
- Arbor vitae – Thuja occidentalis
- Aroma – Prosopis vidaliana
- Atis – Annona squamosa
- Avocado – Persea americana
- Baby's breath – Muscari armeniacum
- Baho-baho – Lantana camara
- Balsa – Ochroma pyramidale
- Caballero – Caesalpinia pulcherrima
- Cacao – Theobroma cacao
- Caimito – Chrysophyllum cainito
- Calabaza – Cucurbita maxima
- Calachuchi – Plumeria obtusa
- Camote – Ipomea batatas
- Carabao grass – Paspalum conjugatum
- Cassava – Manihot esculenta
- Chico – Achras zapota
- Comfrey – Symphytum officinalis
- Dama de Noche – Cestrum nocturnum
- Fire Tree – Delonix regia
- Golden shower – Cassia fistula
- Guava – Psidium guajava
- Guyabano – Annona muricata
- Hagonoy – Chromolaena odorata
- Ipil-ipil – Leucaena leucocephala
- Kadios – Cajanus cajan
- Kakauate – Glericidia sepium
- Kamatsile – Pithecellobium dulce
- Katakataka – Kalanchoe pinnata
- Kulitis – Amaranthus spinosus
- Lasong-kainan – Blighia sapida
- Mahogany – Swietenia macrophylla
- Makahiya – Mimosa pudica
- Malakamantigi – Impatiens walleriana
- Malapaputok – Crossandra infundibuliformis
- Marigold – Tagetes erecta
- Pineapple – Ananas comosus
- Pukingang-kahoi – Clitoria racemosa
- Sampaguita – Jasminum sambac
- Sibukaw – Caesalpinia sappan
- Mollucan sau – Albizzia falcataria
- Palawan cherry – Cassia nodosa
- Papaya – Carica papaya
- Sampaloc – Tamarindus indica
- Santan – Ixora coccinea
- Siniguelas – Spondeas purporea
- Sugarcane – Saccharum officinarum
- Tiesa – Pouteria campechiana
- Tobacco – Nicotiana tabacum
- Trompeta – Brugmansia suaveolens, Brugmansia arborea
- Tuba-tuba – Jatropha curcas

== See also ==
- Wildlife of the Philippines
- List of the orchids of the Philippines
