= Petersianthus =

Scientific classification
- Kingdom: Plantae
- Clade: Tracheophytes
- Clade: Angiosperms
- Clade: Eudicots
- Clade: Asterids
- Order: Ericales
- Family: Lecythidaceae
- Genus: Petersianthus; Merr.

Synonyms
- Petersia Welw. ex Benth. & Hook.f. 1865, illegitimate name, not Klotzsch 1861 (syn of Capparis in Capparaceae); Combretodendron A.Chev., not validly published

Genus of flowering plants

Petersianthus is a genus of woody plant in the Lecythidaceae family first described as a genus in 1865 under the name Petersia. This turned out to be an illegitimate homonym, meaning that it had already been used by someone else to refer to a very different plant. So the name of these species in the Lecythidaceae was changed to Petersianthus. It is native to the Philippines and to parts of Africa. The following two species belong to this genus, with the basionyms of both taxa belonging to what is known today as the family Combretaceae.

species

1. Petersianthus macrocarpus (P.Beauv.) Liben (syn. Combretum macrocarpum P.Beauv.) - Guinea, Ivory Coast, Cameroon, Congo Republic, Democratic Republic of the Congo, Cabinda, Gabon, Angola
2. Petersianthus quadrialatus (Merr.) Merr. (syn. Terminalia quadrialata Merr.) - Philippines
