= Diospyros cauliflora =

Conservation status
- Least Concern (IUCN 3.1)

Scientific classification
- Kingdom: Plantae
- Clade: Tracheophytes
- Clade: Angiosperms
- Clade: Eudicots
- Clade: Asterids
- Order: Ericales
- Family: Ebenaceae
- Genus: Diospyros
- Species: D. cauliflora

Binomial name
- Diospyros cauliflora Blume

Synonyms
- List: Diospyros caliginosa Ridl.; Diospyros fasciculiflora Merr.; Diospyros faucium Lecomte; Diospyros perforata Hiern; Diospyros pergamena Hiern; Diospyros pulgarensis (Elmer) Merr.; Diospyros refracta Hiern; Diospyros treubii Hochr.; Diospyros trunciflora Ridl.; Diospyros urdanetensis Elmer; Diospyros zollingeri Hiern; Rinorea pulgarensis Elmer

Species of flowering plant

Diospyros cauliflora is a tree in the family Ebenaceae. The specific epithet cauliflora means cauliflorous, i.e. flowers growing directly from the trunk or branches.

== Description ==
Diospyros cauliflora grows up to 17 metres (56 ft) tall, with a cauliflorous trunk. The leaves are membranous and measure up to 40 cm (16 in) long. The inflorescences may be on the trunk, branches or twigs. The fruits are eaten by various species of civet.

== Distribution and habitat ==
Diospyros cauliflora is native to an area of mainland and maritime Southeast Asia, from Myanmar south and east to the Maluku Islands. Its habitat is in lowland dipterocarp and hill forests, to elevations of around 500 m (1,600 ft).
