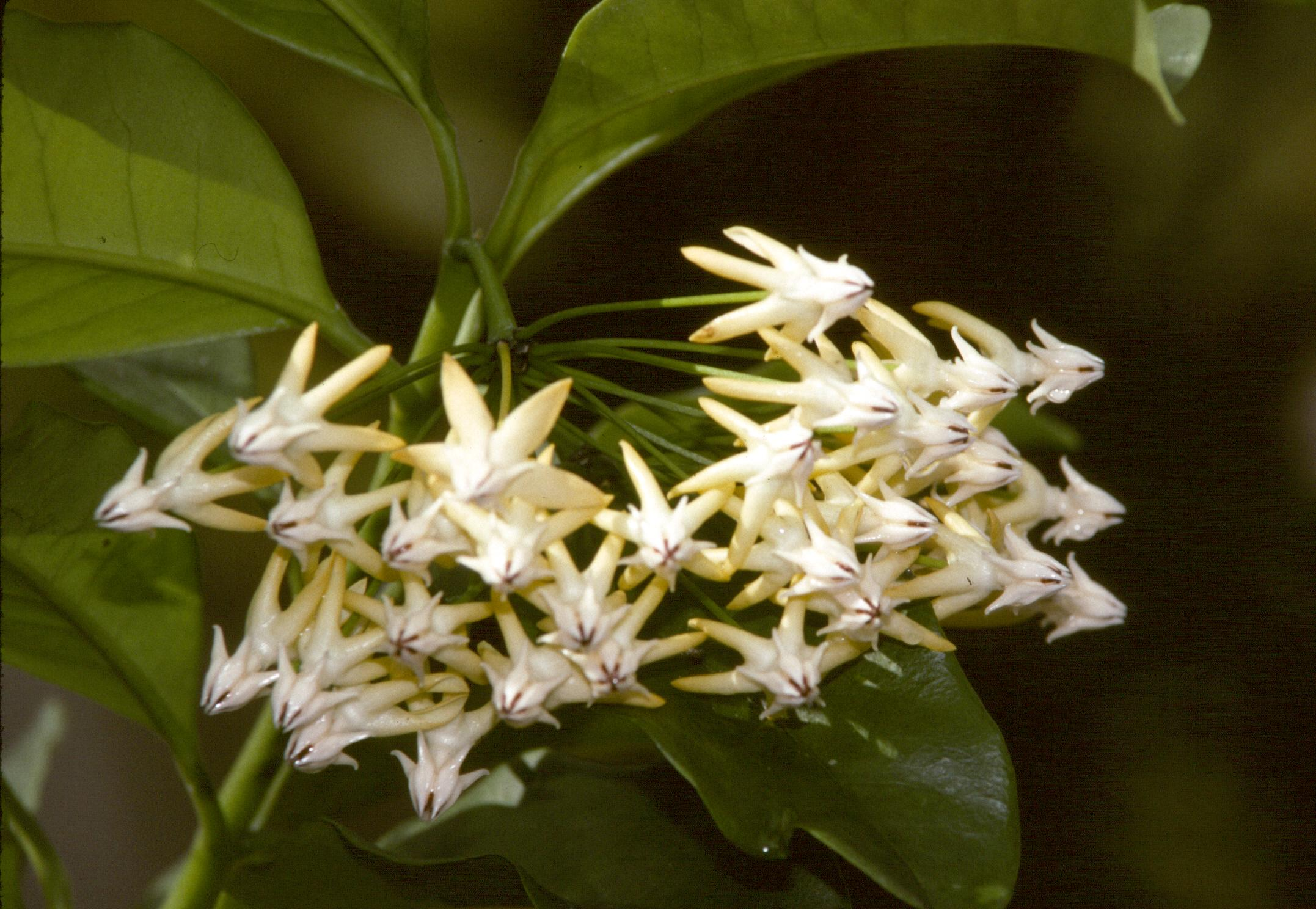

Scientific classification
- Kingdom: Plantae
- Clade: Tracheophytes
- Clade: Angiosperms
- Clade: Eudicots
- Clade: Asterids
- Order: Gentianales
- Family: Apocynaceae
- Genus: Hoya
- Species: H. multiflora

Binomial name
- Hoya multiflora Blume

Synonyms
- 29 synonyms: Centrostemma multiflorum (Blume) Decne.; Cyrtoceras multiflorum (Blume) Heynh.; Asclepias carnosa Blanco; Asclepias stellata Burm. ex Decne.; Centrostemma cyrtoceras Meisn.; Centrostemma elegans Blume; Centrostemma floribunda Bosse; Centrostemma laurifolium Blume; Centrostemma lindleyanum Decne.; Centrostemma micranthum Blume; Centrostemma platypetalum Merr.; Centrostemma yunnanense P.T.Li; Cyrtoceras coriaceum Heynh.; Cyrtoceras elegans (Blume) Miq.; Cyrtoceras floribundum Maund; Cyrtoceras laurifolium Miq.; Cyrtoceras lindleyanum (Decne.) Miq.; Cyrtoceras micranthum (Blume) Miq.; Cyrtoceras reflexum Benn.; Cyrtoceras uncinatum Teijsm. & Binn.; Hoya celebica Boerl.; Hoya coriacea Lindl.; Hoya costantinii P.T.Li; Hoya elegans (Blume) Boerl.; Hoya gongshanica P.T.Li; Hoya javanica Boerl.; Hoya lii C.M.Burton; Hoya lindleyana (Decne.) Fern.-Vill.; Hoya reticulata Costantin

= Hoya multiflora =

Species of plant

Hoya multiflora, commonly known as shooting star hoya, is a species of evergreen tropical plants in the oleander and frangipani family Apocynaceae. It is an epiphytic shrub to about 2.5 m (8 ft 2 in) tall, producing large clusters of distinctive "shooting star" flowers. It is native to Assam, Bangladesh, southern China, Indo-China and Malesia.
