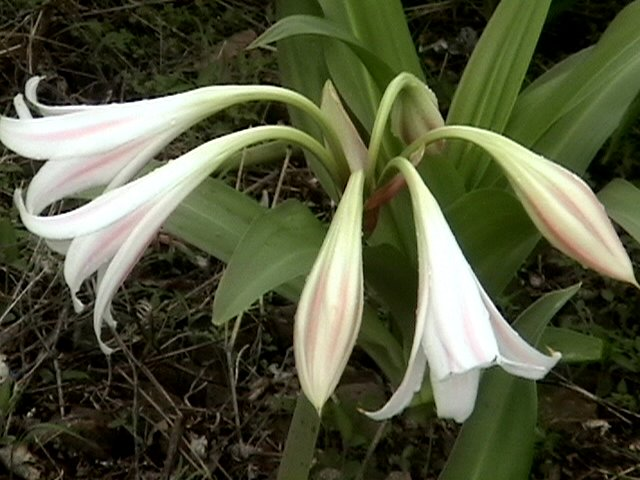
- Pink Striped Trumpet Lily

Scientific classification
- Kingdom: Plantae
- Clade: Tracheophytes
- Clade: Angiosperms
- Clade: Monocots
- Order: Asparagales
- Family: Amaryllidaceae
- Subfamily: Amaryllidoideae
- Genus: Crinum
- Species: C. latifolium

Binomial name
- Crinum latifolium L.

Synonyms
- Amaryllis insignis Ker Gawl.; Amaryllis moluccana Ker Gawl.; Crinum cochinchinense M.Roem.; Crinum esquirolii H.Lév.; Crinum insigne (Ker Gawl.) Sweet; Crinum jemenicum Dammann; Crinum longistylum Herb. ex Steud.; Crinum moluccanum Roxb. ex Ker Gawl.; Crinum ornatum var. latifolium (L.) Herb.

= Crinum latifolium =

Species of plant in the amaryllis family

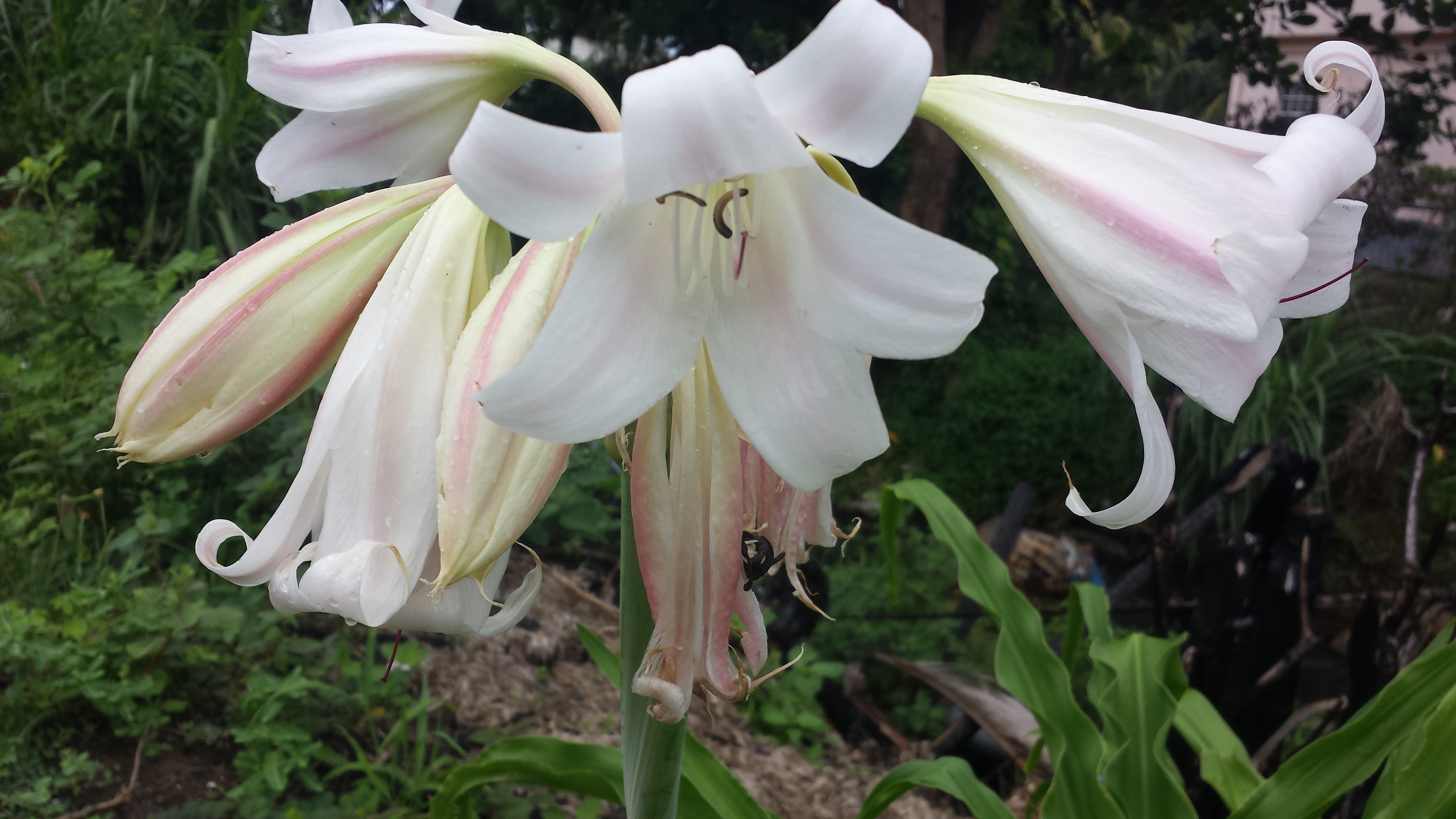

Crinum latifolium is a herbaceous perennial flowering plant in the amaryllis family (Amaryllidaceae). It arises from an underground bulb. The flowering stems are stout, reaching about 2 m in height. The leaves are long, linear and ligulate. The flowers are white and arranged in an umbel. It grows naturally in Asia, from India and Sri Lanka through much of mainland Southeast Asia to south China (Guangxi, Guizhou, Yunnan). It is also reportedly naturalized in the West Indies and in the Chagos Archipelago.
