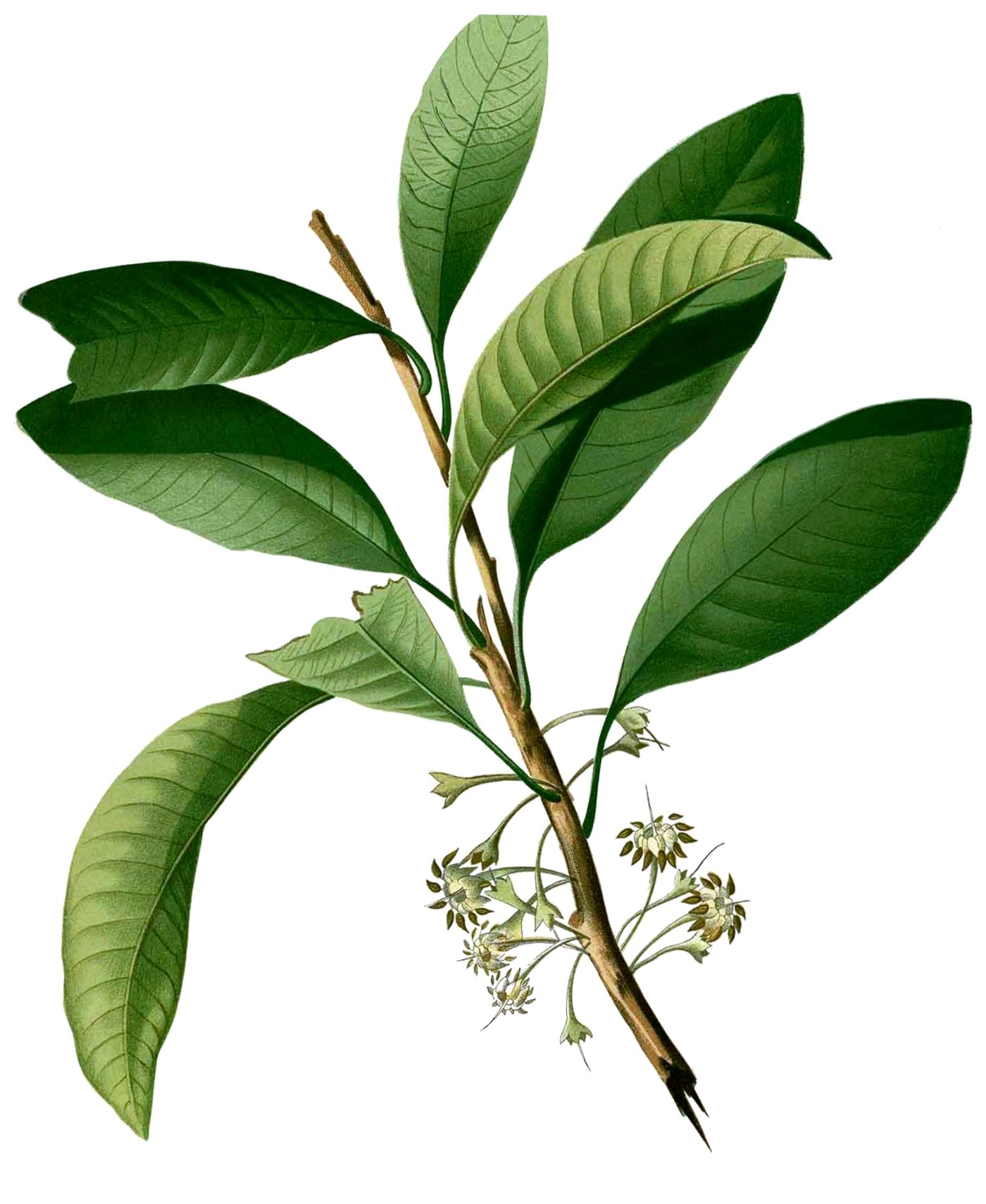

Conservation status
- Vulnerable (IUCN 2.3)

Scientific classification
- Kingdom: Plantae
- Clade: Tracheophytes
- Clade: Angiosperms
- Clade: Eudicots
- Clade: Asterids
- Order: Ericales
- Family: Sapotaceae
- Genus: Palaquium
- Species: P. philippense

Binomial name
- Palaquium philippense (Perr.) C.B.Rob.

= Palaquium philippense =

Species of flowering plant

Palaquium philippense is a species of plant in the family Sapotaceae. It is endemic to the Philippines. It is threatened by habitat loss.

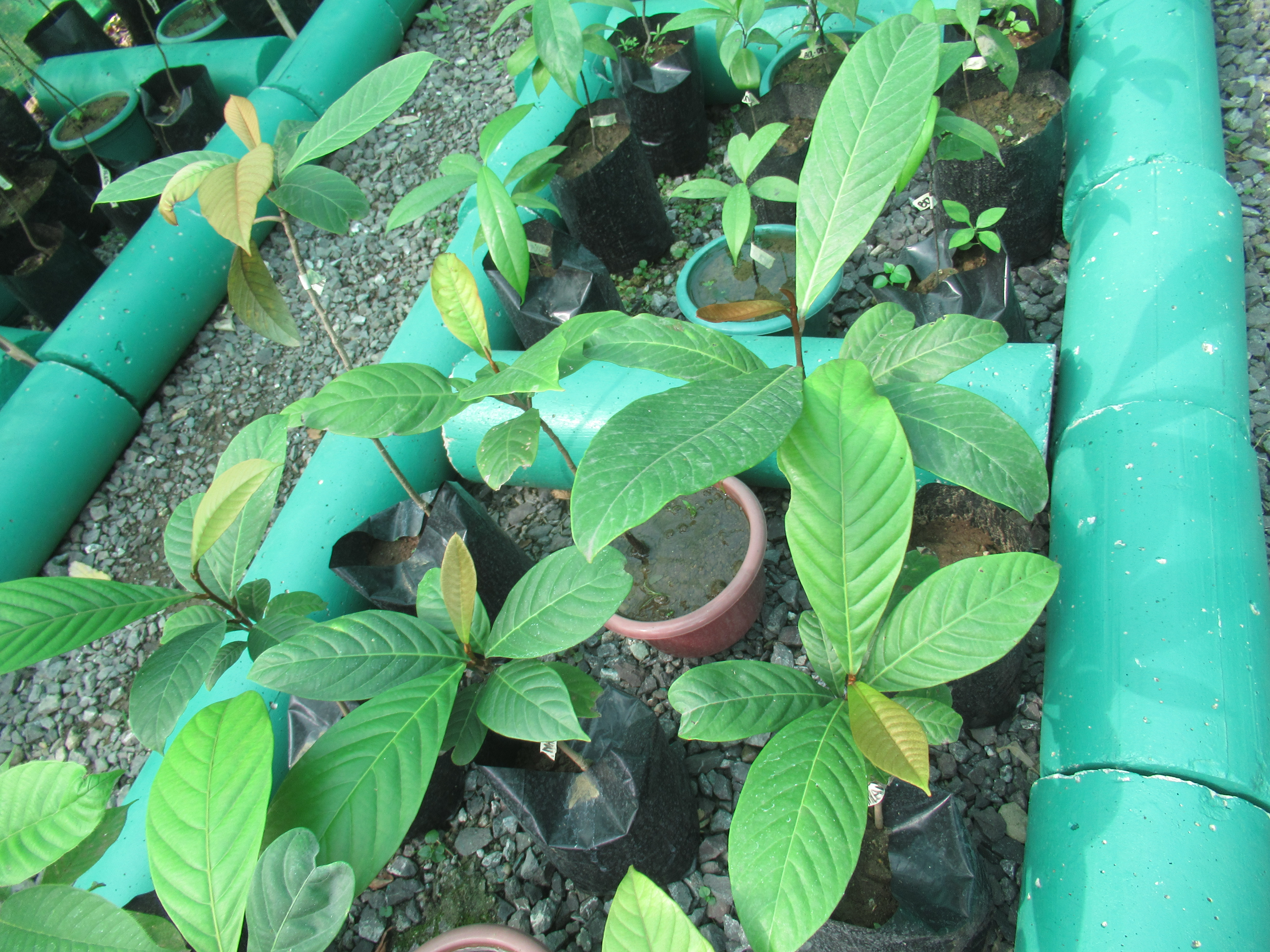
Seedling

According to Blanco's book (1845), Palaquium philippense, one of the tallest forest trees is also known as palacpalac, derived from the Kapampangan term used in reference to malakmalak. Malakmalak is a tree reaching a height of about 25 meters and a diameter of about 80 centimeters. The leaves are usually 16 centimeters or more in length. The lower surfaces are about 1.5. centimeters in length, and are borne on long stalks in small clusters. The corolla is white, the calyx brown and velvety. this species is very common and widely distributed in primary forests at low and medium altitudes from northern Luzon to southern Mindanao. It is cultivated at the Lamao Experimental Station.

The fruit of this species is oval, similar to chico in appearance, about 3 to 4 centimeters or more in length, with an edible pulp of good flavor, and contains a single seed. Blanco mentioned that the seeds yield limpid, odorous oil which is employed in food as an illuminant. It is also called Palaquium oleiferum blanco.
