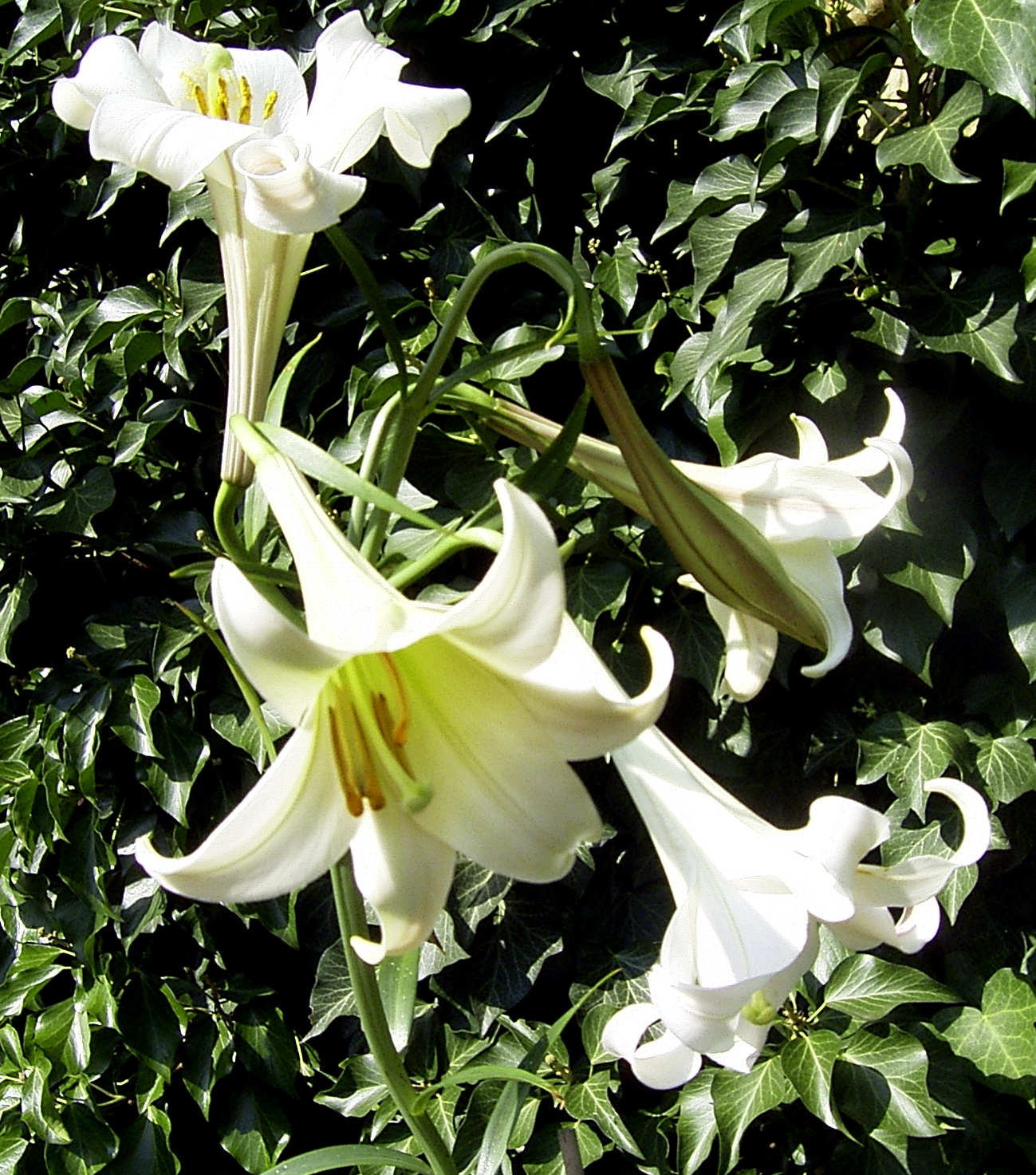

Scientific classification
- Kingdom: Plantae
- Clade: Embryophytes
- Clade: Tracheophytes
- Clade: Spermatophytes
- Clade: Angiosperms
- Clade: Monocots
- Order: Liliales
- Family: Liliaceae
- Subfamily: Lilioideae
- Genus: Lilium
- Species: L. philippinense

Binomial name
- Lilium philippinense Baker

Synonyms
- Lilium yoshidae Leichtlin

= Lilium philippinense =

Species of lily

Lilium philippinense, commonly known as the Benguet lily, or Philippine lily, is a lily native to Taiwan and to the Cordillera region, primarily to the province of Benguet, in the northern Philippines. This flower has several native names like us-usdong ("bowing", Kankanaey), kanyon (Ilocano from Spanish cañón "tube") and sabong ti bantay ("mountain flower").

== Description ==
It grows in well drained rocky slope soil under direct sunlight.

The plant's flowers are white trumpet-shaped, known to emit a fragrant odor.

== Conservation status ==
Lilium philippinense is endangered and is known to thrive only in high altitudes of the Cordillera Central mountains mostly between 1,443 and 1,868 meters. In August 2013, the Baguio City Environment and Parks Management Office personnel had successfully raised the lilies for six months at the city's Botanical Garden.
