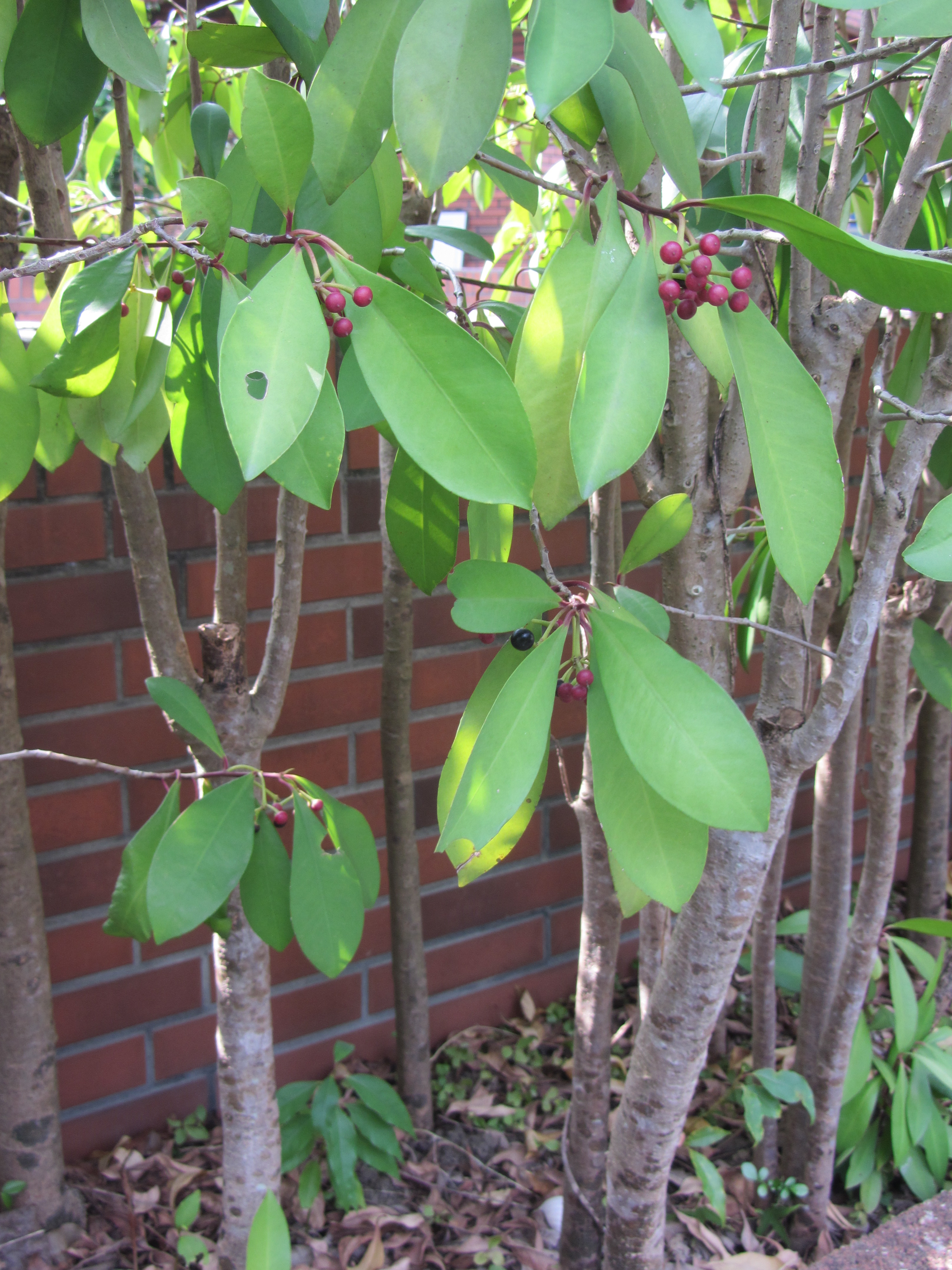

Conservation status
- Vulnerable (IUCN 2.3)

Scientific classification
- Kingdom: Plantae
- Clade: Tracheophytes
- Clade: Angiosperms
- Clade: Eudicots
- Clade: Asterids
- Order: Ericales
- Family: Primulaceae
- Genus: Ardisia
- Species: A. squamulosa

Binomial name
- Ardisia squamulosa C.Presl

= Ardisia squamulosa =

Species of flowering plant

Ardisia squamulosa is a species of plant in the family Primulaceae. It is endemic to the Philippines. It is used to flavor fish.

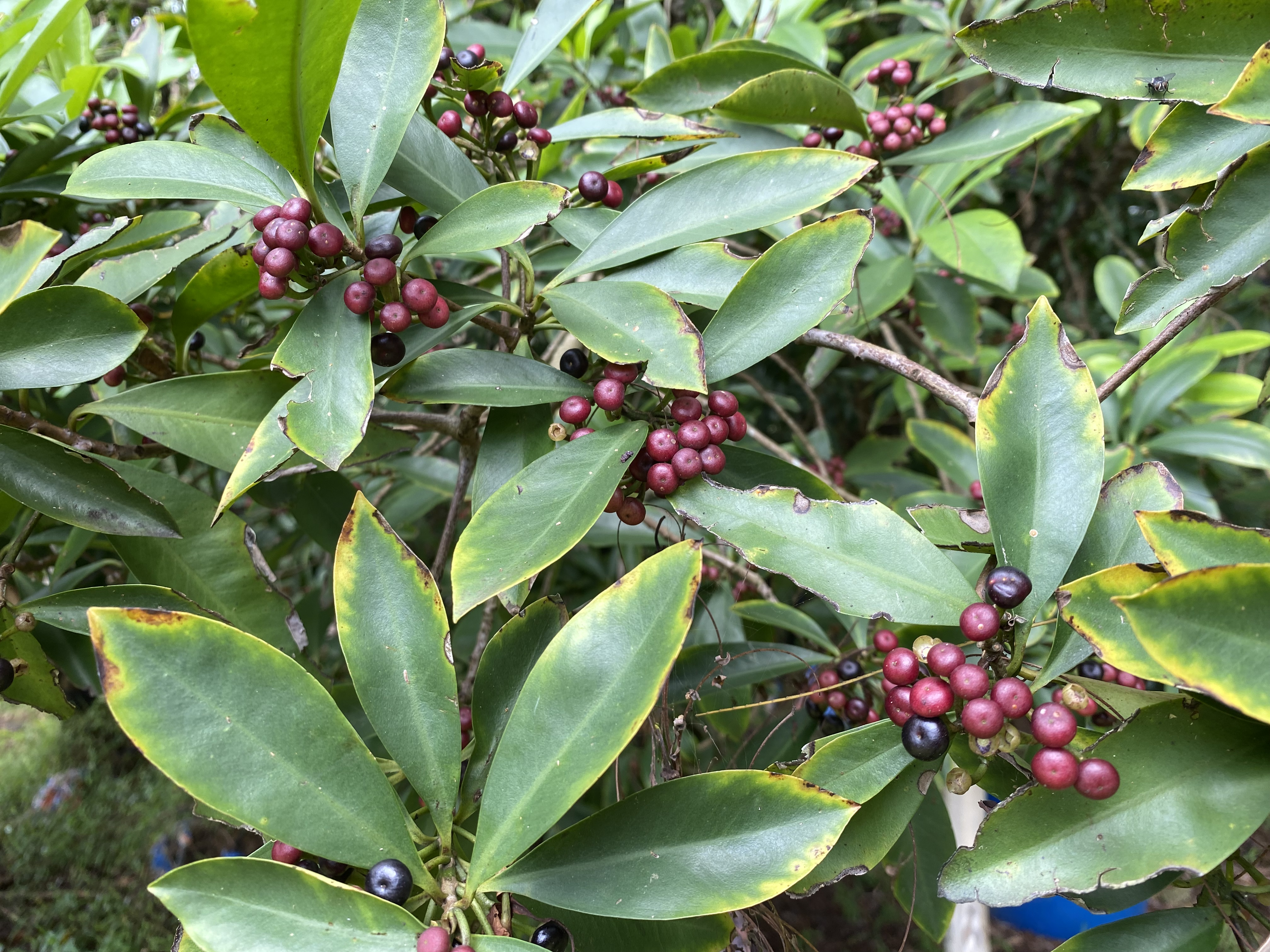
Closeup of leaves and fruits
