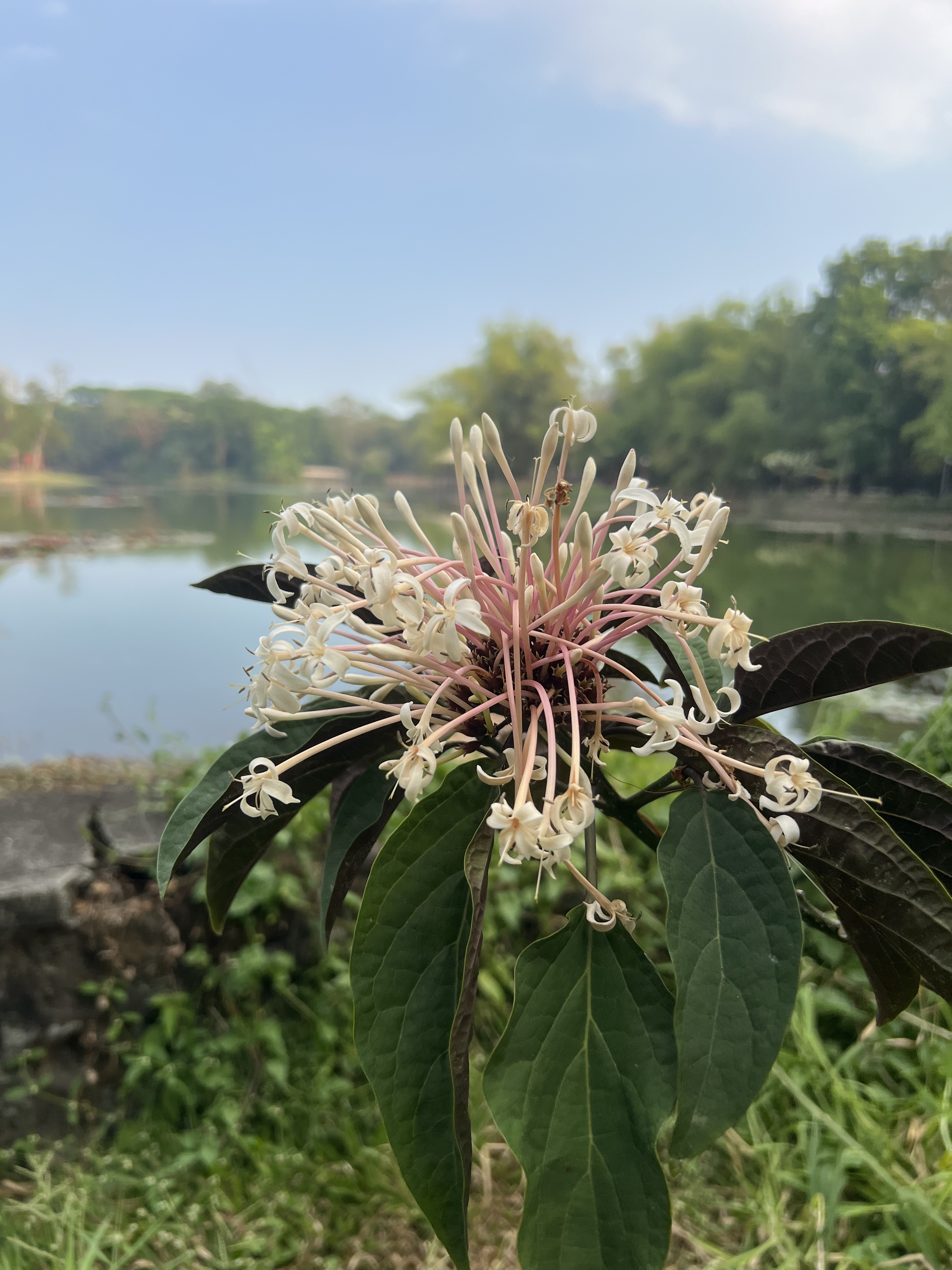

Conservation status
- Least Concern (IUCN 3.1)

Scientific classification
- Kingdom: Plantae
- Clade: Tracheophytes
- Clade: Angiosperms
- Clade: Eudicots
- Clade: Asterids
- Order: Lamiales
- Family: Lamiaceae
- Genus: Clerodendrum
- Species: C. quadriloculare

Binomial name
- Clerodendrum quadriloculare (Blanco) Merr.

Synonyms
- Ligustrum quadriloculare Blanco; Clerodendrum blancoanum Fern.-Vill.; Clerodendrum navesianum Vidal

= Clerodendrum quadriloculare =

Species of flowering plant

Clerodendrum quadriloculare (known as the bronze-leaved clerodendrum, fireworks plant, Philippine glorybower, shooting star or starburst bush in English, and bagawak or bagawak morado in Filipino) is a species of flowering plant native to New Guinea and the Philippines. It is one of many species previously included in the family Verbenaceae, but transferred to the Lamiaceae based on molecular studies. The plants produce flowers which look good in a garden, but it can be difficult to eradicate.

== Description ==
The bronze-leaved clerodendrum is a medium to large-sized shrub growing to a height of about 5 m (16 ft). The branches and twigs are four-sided. The leaves are in opposite pairs and are borne on medium-length petioles. The leaf blades are oblong and up to 20 cm (8 in) long, the upper surface being green and the underside purple; they have rounded bases, wavy margins and pointed tips. The showy flower clusters are borne at the tips of the shoots. Each contains many flowers with slender pink tubes about 7 cm (3 in) long, each terminated by five slender white, reflexed corolla lobes about 1.5 cm (0.6 in) long. The flowers are followed by ellipsoid, capsules containing four seeds. The corolla tubes are exceptionally long and require specialist pollinators.

== Distribution and habitat ==
The bronze-leaved clerodendrum is native to the Philippines and Papua New Guinea, and has also been recorded from American Samoa, the Federated States of Micronesia, Fiji, French Polynesia, Guam, the Marshall Islands, the Northern Mariana Islands, Palau, Rarotonga in the Cook Islands, and Samoa, as well as Puerto Rico, Singapore, and Hawaii. As well as parks and gardens, it is found on road verges and on disturbed ground, pastures, forest edges and undisturbed forests where it is able to displace native species.

== Invasiveness ==
The bronze-leaved clerodendrum is grown as an ornamental shrub but it has become naturalised in many locations, in some of which it is viewed as an invasive species. It is a vigorous, rapid-growing shrub which sends up suckers which may develop into thickets. Additionally, cuttings and pieces of detached roots are easily moved with soil and can develop into new plants, and the seeds, which germinate readily, are spread by animals and birds in their droppings. This shrub can grow in full sun, partial shade and deep shade, and in some locations grows as a dense, mono-specific ground cover layer under the forest canopy.

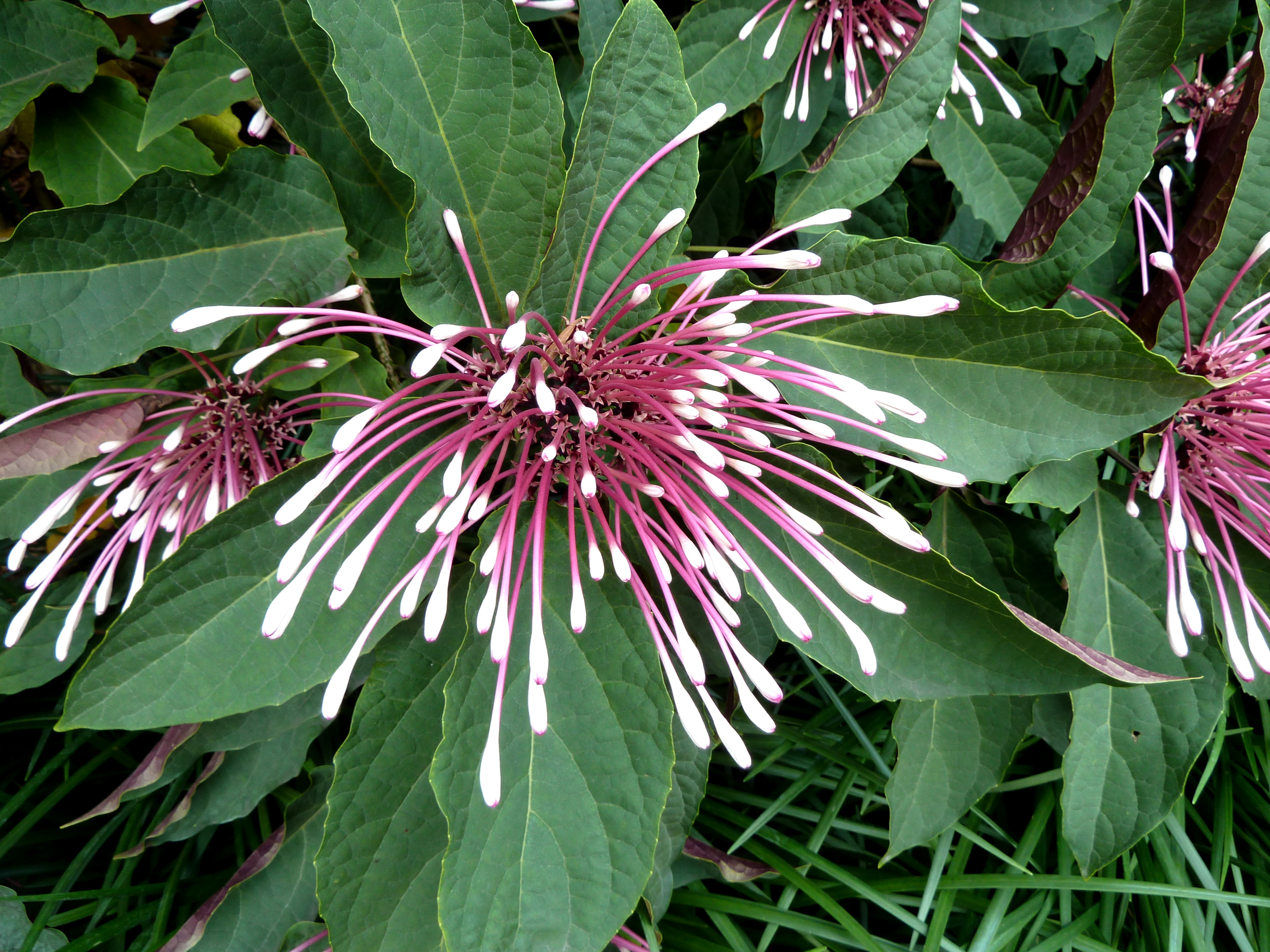
In bloom at the Fairchild Tropical Botanic Garden.

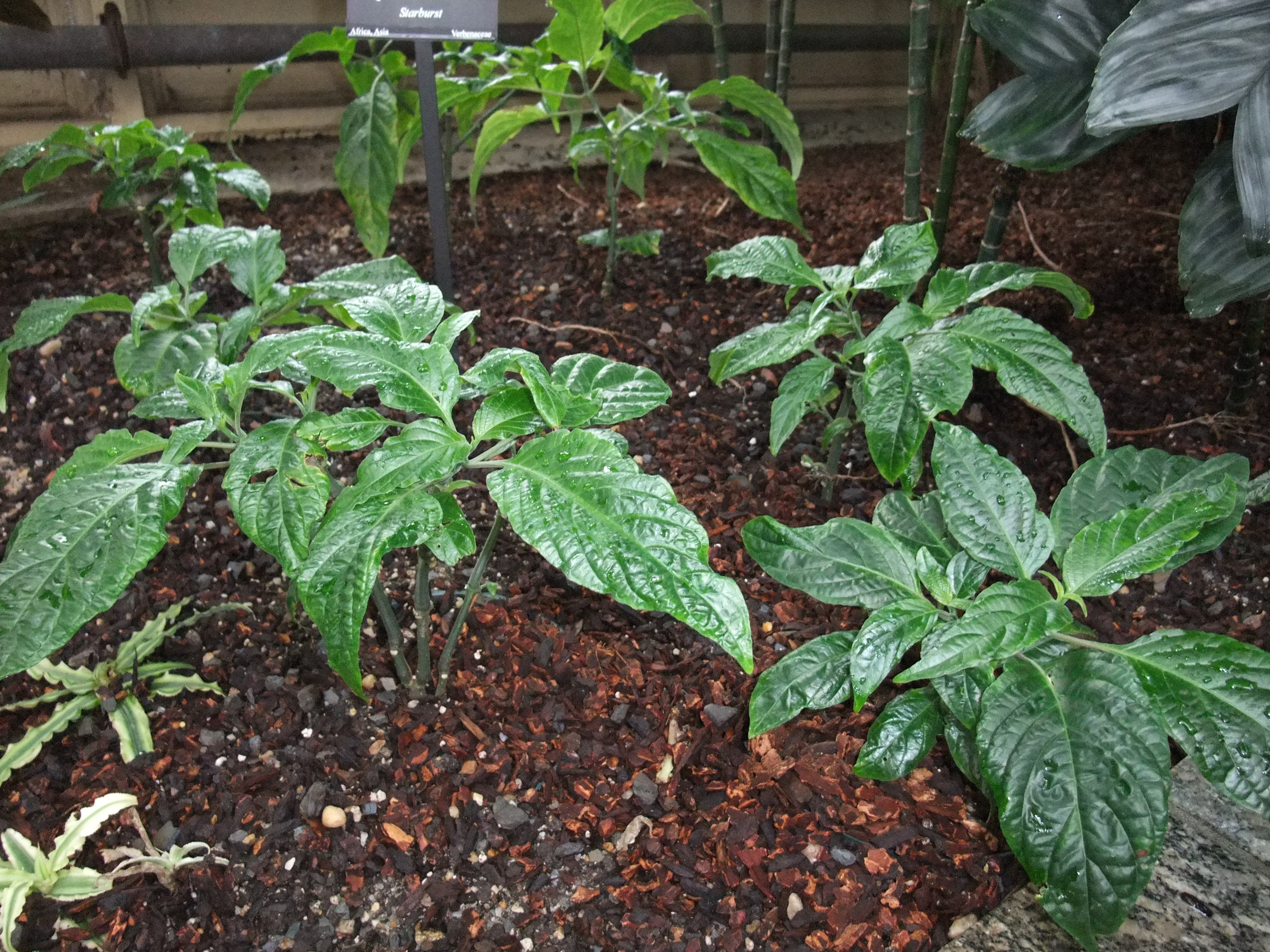
Seedlings

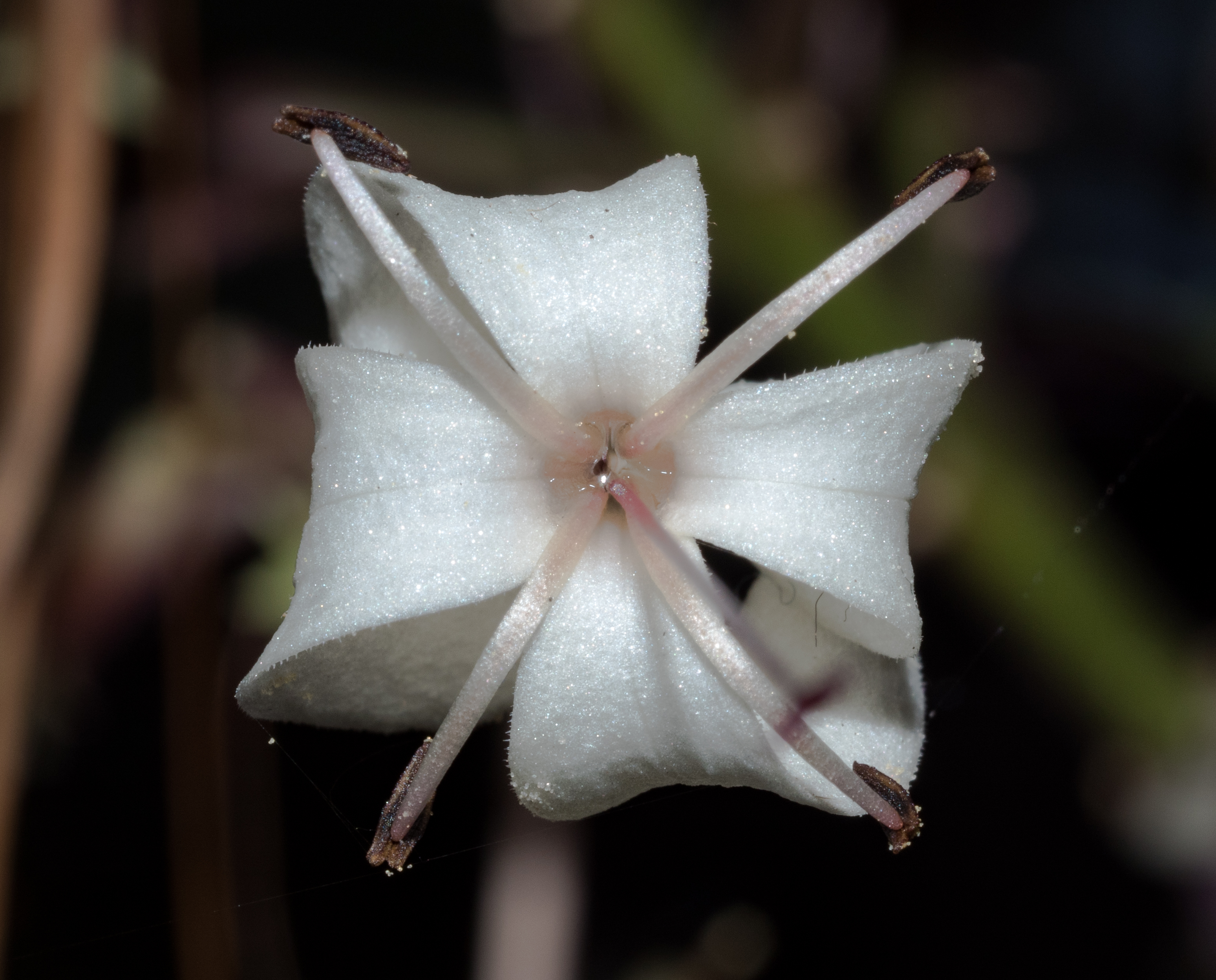
Close-up of a C. quadriculare flower
