= Planchonella villamilii =

Conservation status
- Endangered (IUCN 3.1)

Scientific classification
- Kingdom: Plantae
- Clade: Tracheophytes
- Clade: Angiosperms
- Clade: Eudicots
- Clade: Asterids
- Order: Ericales
- Family: Sapotaceae
- Genus: Planchonella
- Species: P. villamilii

Binomial name
- Planchonella villamilii (Merr.) Swenson

Synonyms
- Bureavella villamilii (Merr.) Aubrév.; Pouteria villamilii (Merr.) Baehni; Sideroxylon villamilii Merr.

Species of flowering plant

Planchonella villamilii (also called white nato) is a species of flowering plant in the family Sapotaceae. It is a tree endemic to the island of Luzon in the Philippines, where it is commonly known as dolitan.

It is a large tree, growing up to 30 meters tall. It flowers in June and sets fruit in March, May, and September.

It is native to lowland primary rainforest, and has been observed on Mount Mariveles in Bataan province, Mount Makiling in Laguna province, and in Cagayan Province on the island of Luzon, and on Siargao Island in Surigao del Norte Province. It is threatened by habitat loss from deforestation of its native forests for commercial timber, plantations, shifting agriculture, commodity agriculture, and urbanization. Some populations are within protected areas, including Wangag Watershed Forest Reserve, Siargao Protected Landscape/Seascape, and Mount Makiling Forest Reserve. The species is assessed as Endangered by the IUCN.

The species was first described as Sideroxylon villamilii in 1915 by Elmer Drew Merrill. In 2023 Ulf Swenson placed it in genus Planchonella as P. villamilii.
