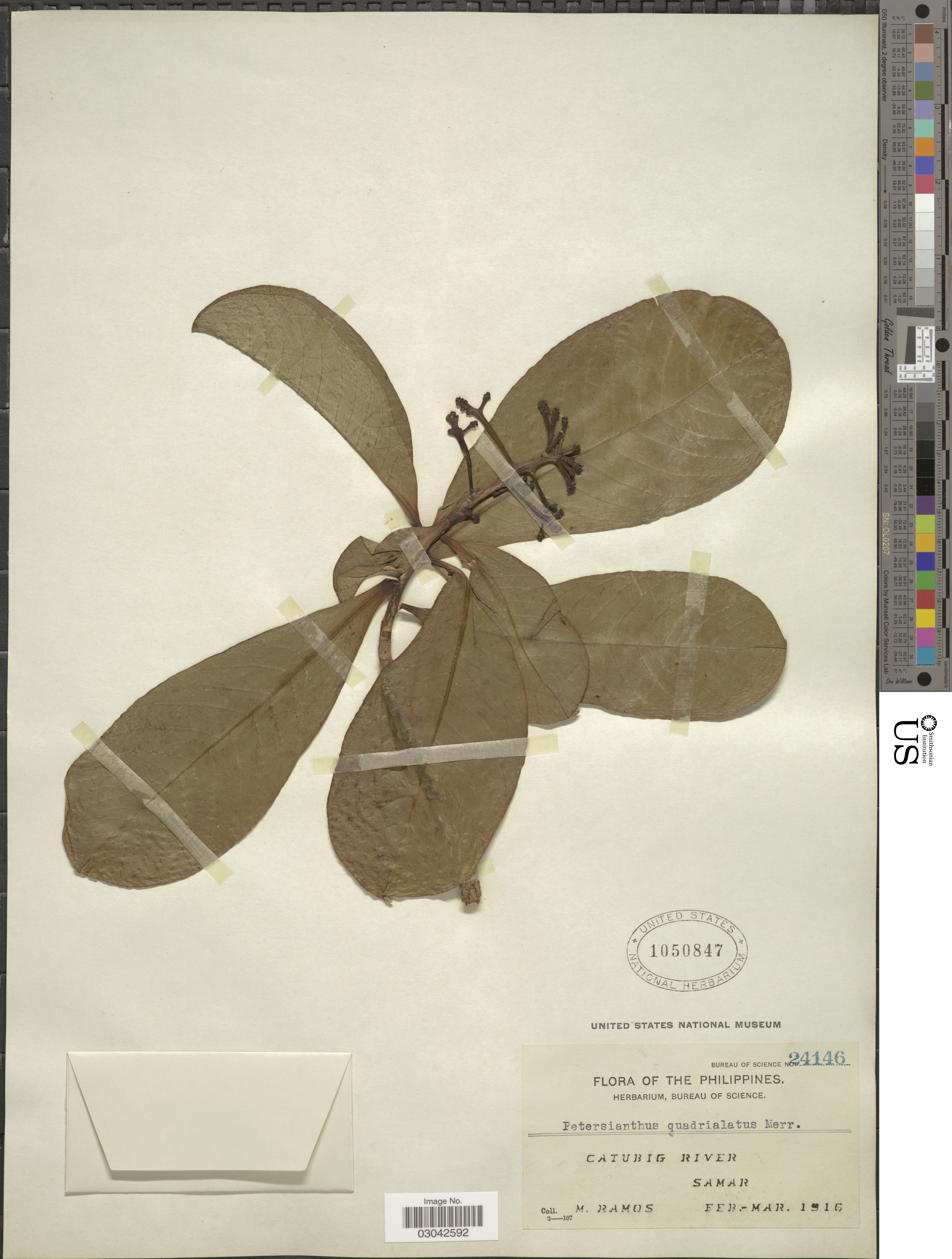
- Specimen of Petersianthus quadrialatus collected in Samar (1916).

Conservation status
- Near Threatened (IUCN 3.1)

Scientific classification
- Kingdom: Plantae
- Clade: Tracheophytes
- Clade: Angiosperms
- Clade: Eudicots
- Clade: Asterids
- Order: Ericales
- Family: Lecythidaceae
- Genus: Petersianthus
- Species: P. quadrialatus

Binomial name
- Petersianthus quadrialatus (Merr.) Merr.

Synonyms
- Combretodendron quadrialatum (Merr.) R.Knuth 1939, synonym; Terminalia quadrialata Merr.

= Petersianthus quadrialatus =

Species of tree

Petersianthus quadrialatus (also called toog and Philippine rosewood) is an emergent tropical rainforest tree species in the Lecythidaceae family. In the Visayas region called kapullan, in the Samar and Leyte areas - magtalisai. It is an indigenous tree species in the southeastern Philippines and one of the largest tree species in the Philippines islands.

== Taxonomy ==
This species was firstly described as Terminalia quadrialata of the family Combretaceae in Merrill (1909:301), but was later renamed with a new genus for the family Lecythidaceae, i.e. Petersianthus by the original author.

== Description ==
=== Morphology ===
The leaves are simple, spirally arranged, obovate, 10–16 cm long and 5–8 cm wide. The base is acutely acuminate, long cuneate, apex rounded caudate. Glossy and dark green, the petioles are short with short soft hairs. Fruits are in capsule form in flat circular outline containing four large winged seeds.

=== Growth and size ===
Natural regeneration is very scarce. Seedlings can be found as far as 200 m from mother trees, especially between buttresses. Height increment in a 2-year-old plantation was 0.7 – 2.9 m and diameter increment is 0.6 – 3.8 cm. Petersianthus quadrialatus trees coppice easily.

A deciduous, medium to very large rainforest tree species that grows up to 40–60 m tall and 80-100 (occasionally -250-370) cm in diameter at breast height. The trunk is straight, cylindrical, branchless with a length of 20–30 m. Buttress is occasionally up to 2 m high.

=== Largest tree ===
Currently known tallest Petersianthus quadrialatus growing near national highway, in the outskirts of San Francisco town, Alegria municipality in the northeastern part of Mindanao island. The tree is 65 metres (213 ft) meters high, 360 centimetres (140 in) in diameter, and estimated to be ~ 300 years old.

== Distribution ==
Petersianthus quadrialatus is endemic to the part of the southeastern Philippines - Mindanao, Panay, Leyte, Samar, Negros, Masbate and surrounding smaller islands.

== Habitat ==
Petersianthus quadrialatus grows in an elevation that ranges from sea level up to about 400 meters. Tree is fairly common and grows scattered in primary and secondary tropical rainforest, near riverbanks or on hillside, in swampy and cool places. It thrives in an area where rainfall is evenly distributed throughout the year. It requires well-drained, clayish, sandy and loamy soils.

== Uses ==
Leaves are medicinal especially in treating skin rashes. Seeds are edible and taste like groundnut. Because its wood is hard and difficult to cut and is as strong as molave (Vitex parviflora), its highly preferred for heavy construction such as bridges, beams, joists, poles, wood piles of wharves and piers, veneer, and plywood, also for door faces and door components like jambs, stops and casing.

=== Habitat destruction ===
Considered a disappearing tree due to logging and kaingin-making.

== See also ==
- List of superlative trees

== Bibliography ==
- Merrill, E. D. (1909). "New or Noteworthy Philippine plants, VII". The Philippine Journal of Science, Section C. Botany. 4 (3): 247–330.
- Merrill, E. D. (1916). "New plants from Samar". The Philippine Journal of Science, Section C. Botany. 11 (4): 175–206.
