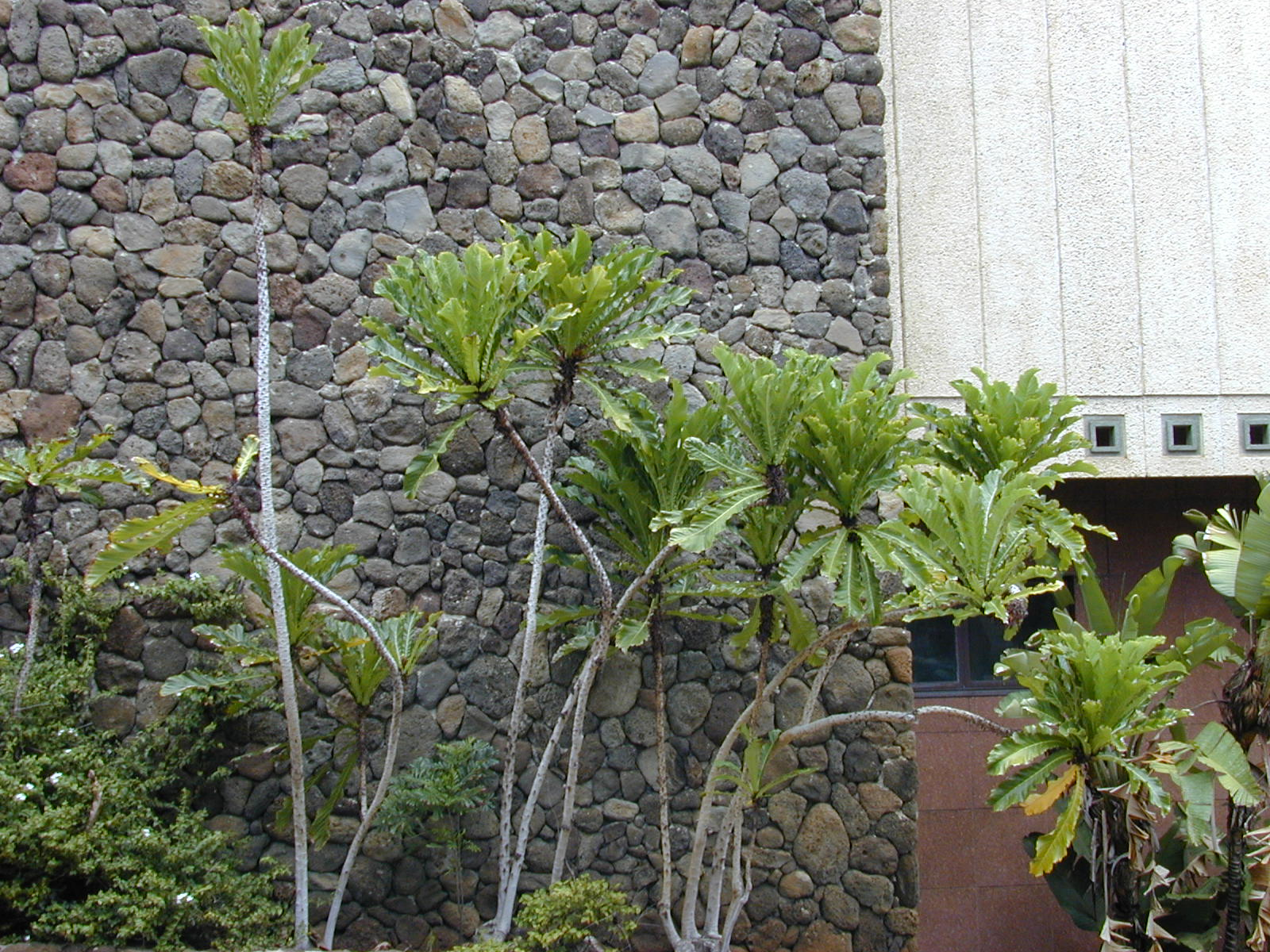

Conservation status
- Least Concern (IUCN 3.1)

Scientific classification
- Kingdom: Plantae
- Clade: Tracheophytes
- Clade: Angiosperms
- Clade: Eudicots
- Clade: Rosids
- Order: Rosales
- Family: Moraceae
- Genus: Ficus
- Subgenus: F. subg. Sycomorus
- Species: F. pseudopalma

Binomial name
- Ficus pseudopalma Blanco

Synonyms
- Ficus blancoi Elmer; Ficus blancoi var. longigrandifolia Sata; Ficus blancoi var. oblanceifolia Sata; Ficus haenkei Warb.

= Ficus pseudopalma =

Species of fig

Ficus pseudopalma is a species of fig, (subgenus Sycamorus) in the mulberry family (Moraceae). It is known by the common names Philippine fig, dracaena fig, and palm-leaf fig. In nature it is endemic to the Philippines, especially the island of Luzon. It is known elsewhere as an ornamental plant.

This is a shrub or rarely branching small tree growing erect with a naked unbranched mesocaul stem topped with a cluster of wavey-edged leaves to give it the appearance of a palm. Indeed, the species name pseudopalma means "false palm". The leaves are 75–100 cm (30–40 in) long and up to 15 cm (6 in) wide, with a yellow midrib and edged with dull teeth. The edges of the leaf are elevated above the midrib, forming a sort of trough. The fruit is a dark green fig that grows in pairs, each measuring 2.5 cm (1 in).

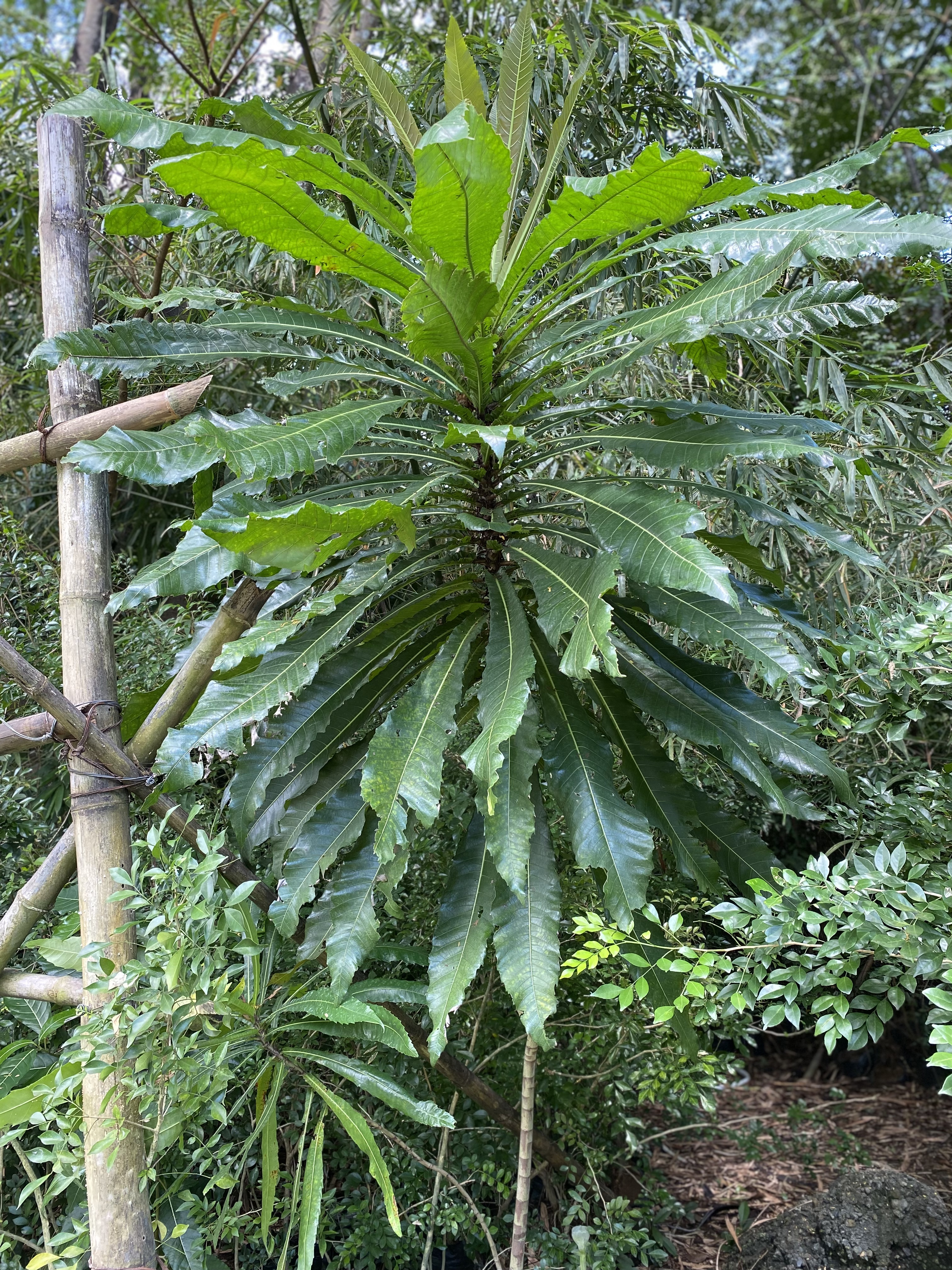

In Luzon, this plant occurs in grassland and forest habitat, where it is considered common. The new shoots of the plant are eaten as a type of vegetable, and there are a number of traditional medicinal uses, such as a remedy for kidney stones made from the leaves. In Bicol Region the plant is known as Lubi-lubi and the leaves are cooked in coconut milk. In 2003 the leaves were sold in markets for US$0.74 per kilogram, and the plant can be grown in plantations without pesticides for an adequate profit.

This shrub has been used as a landscaping plant in Hawaii, but it never escaped cultivation or became established in the wild because the species of wasp that pollinates it was never brought to the islands.
