= Madhuca curtisii =

Conservation status
- Vulnerable (IUCN 3.1)

Scientific classification
- Kingdom: Plantae
- Clade: Embryophytes
- Clade: Tracheophytes
- Clade: Angiosperms
- Clade: Eudicots
- Clade: Asterids
- Order: Ericales
- Family: Sapotaceae
- Genus: Madhuca
- Species: M. curtisii

Binomial name
- Madhuca curtisii (King & Gamble) Ridl.

Synonyms
- Bassia curtisii King & Gamble; Bassia perakensis King & Gamble; Ganua chrysocarpa Pierre ex Dubard; Ganua curtisii (King & Gamble) H.J.Lam; Isonandra curtisii (King & Gamble) Baehni; Madhuca chrysocarpa (Pierre ex Dubard) Ridl.; Madhuca perakensis (King & Gamble) Ridl.

Species of tree

Madhuca curtisii is a tree in the family Sapotaceae.

== Description ==
Madhuca curtisii grows up to 28 metres (90 ft) tall, with a trunk diameter of up to 50 cm (20 in). The bark is reddish brown. Inflorescences bear up to 12 flowers, which are fragrant and greenish cream-coloured.

== Distribution and habitat ==
Madhuca curtisii is native to Peninsular Malaysia and Borneo. Its habitat is forests to 1,800 m (6,000 ft) altitude.

== Conservation ==
Madhuca curtisii has been assessed as vulnerable on the IUCN Red List. The species is threatened by logging and conversion of land for palm oil plantations.
