= Madhuca cuprea =

Conservation status
- Data Deficient (IUCN 2.3)

Scientific classification
- Kingdom: Plantae
- Clade: Tracheophytes
- Clade: Angiosperms
- Clade: Eudicots
- Clade: Asterids
- Order: Ericales
- Family: Sapotaceae
- Genus: Madhuca
- Species: M. cuprea

Binomial name
- Madhuca cuprea (King & Gamble) H.J.Lam

Synonyms
- Bassia cuprea King & Gamble

Species of tree

Madhuca cuprea is a species of plant in the family Sapotaceae. It is a tree endemic to Peninsular Malaysia. The species is confined to rainforest in Perak. There is not enough information to determine whether it is endangered.
