= Madhuca erythrophylla =

Conservation status
- Endangered (IUCN 3.1)

Scientific classification
- Kingdom: Plantae
- Clade: Embryophytes
- Clade: Tracheophytes
- Clade: Angiosperms
- Clade: Eudicots
- Clade: Asterids
- Order: Ericales
- Family: Sapotaceae
- Genus: Madhuca
- Species: M. erythrophylla

Binomial name
- Madhuca erythrophylla (King & Gamble) H.J.Lam

Synonyms
- Bassia erythrophylla King & Gamble

Species of flowering plant

Madhuca erythrophylla is a plant in the family Sapotaceae. The specific epithet erythrophylla means 'red leaves'.

== Description ==
Madhuca erythrophylla grows as a tree up to 20 metres (70 ft) tall, with a trunk diameter of up to 30 cm (12 in). The bark is dark brown. Inflorescences bear up to six flowers.

== Distribution and habitat ==
Madhuca erythrophylla is native to Sumatra, Peninsular Malaysia and Borneo. Its habitat is lowland mixed dipterocarp forests from 50–400 m (200–1,300 ft) altitude.

== Conservation ==
Madhuca erythrophylla has been assessed as endangered on the IUCN Red List. The species is threatened by logging and conversion of land for palm oil plantations.
