= Madhuca sessilis =

Conservation status
- Endangered (IUCN 3.1)

Scientific classification
- Kingdom: Plantae
- Clade: Embryophytes
- Clade: Tracheophytes
- Clade: Angiosperms
- Clade: Eudicots
- Clade: Asterids
- Order: Ericales
- Family: Sapotaceae
- Genus: Madhuca
- Species: M. sessilis

Binomial name
- Madhuca sessilis (King & Gamble) Baehni

Synonyms
- Ganua sessilis (King & Gamble) H.J.Lam; Payena sessilis King & Gamble

Species of tree

Madhuca sessilis is a tree in the family Sapotaceae. The specific epithet sessilis means 'without stalk', referring to the leaves.

== Description ==
Madhuca sessilis grows up to 18 metres (60 ft) tall, with a trunk diameter of up to 35 cm (10 in). The bark is greyish brown. Inflorescences bear two to three flowers. The fruits are purplish-green, round, up to 1 cm (0.4 in) in diameter.

== Distribution and habitat ==
Madhuca sessilis is native to Sumatra, Singapore and Borneo. Its habitat is mixed dipterocarp forest.
