= Madhuca malaccensis =

Conservation status
- Least Concern (IUCN 3.1)

Scientific classification
- Kingdom: Plantae
- Clade: Tracheophytes
- Clade: Angiosperms
- Clade: Eudicots
- Clade: Asterids
- Order: Ericales
- Family: Sapotaceae
- Genus: Madhuca
- Species: M. malaccensis

Binomial name
- Madhuca malaccensis (C.B.Clarke) H.J.Lam

Synonyms
- Bassia malaccensis (C.B.Clarke) King & Gamble; Dasyaulus malaccensis (C.B.Clarke) Dubard; Isonandra malaccensis (C.B.Clarke) Baehni; Payena malaccensis C.B.Clarke

Species of tree

Madhuca malaccensis is a tree in the family Sapotaceae. It is named after Malacca in Peninsular Malaysia.

== Description ==
Madhuca malaccensis grows as a tree up to 25 metres (80 ft) tall, with a trunk diameter of up to 45 centimetres (18 in). The bark is greyish brown. Inflorescences bears up to eight flowers. The fruits are oblong, up to 2.7 cm (1 in) long.

== Distribution and habitat ==
Madhuca malaccensis is native to Thailand, Sumatra, Peninsular Malaysia, Singapore and Borneo. Its habitat is mixed dipterocarp forest to 4,400 m (14,000 ft) altitude.
