= Madhuca korthalsii =

Conservation status
- Near Threatened (IUCN 3.1)

Scientific classification
- Kingdom: Plantae
- Clade: Embryophytes
- Clade: Tracheophytes
- Clade: Angiosperms
- Clade: Eudicots
- Clade: Asterids
- Order: Ericales
- Family: Sapotaceae
- Genus: Madhuca
- Species: M. korthalsii

Binomial name
- Madhuca korthalsii (Pierre ex Burck) H.J.Lam

Synonyms
- Bassia braceana King & Gamble; Bassia korthalsii Pierre ex Burck; Illipe korthalsii (Pierre ex Burck) Engl.; Kakosmanthus korthalsii (Pierre ex Burck) Pierre ex Dubard; Vidoricum korthalsii (Pierre ex Burck) Kuntze

Species of tree

Madhuca korthalsii is a tree in the family Sapotaceae. It is named for the Dutch botanist P. W. Korthals.

== Description ==
Madhuca korthalsii grows up to 35 metres (115 ft) tall, with a trunk diameter of up to 50 cm (20 in). The bark is brown. Inflorescences bear up to five white flowers.

== Distribution and habitat ==
Madhuca korthalsii is native to Sumatra, Peninsular Malaysia, Singapore and Borneo. Its habitat is lowland mixed dipterocarp forest to 1,200 m (4,000 ft) altitude.

== Conservation ==
Madhuca korthalsii has been assessed as near threatened on the IUCN Red List. The species is threatened by logging and conversion of land for palm oil plantations.
