= Rhododendron wrayi =

Conservation status
- Least Concern (IUCN 3.1)

Scientific classification
- Kingdom: Plantae
- Clade: Tracheophytes
- Clade: Angiosperms
- Clade: Eudicots
- Clade: Asterids
- Order: Ericales
- Family: Ericaceae
- Genus: Rhododendron
- Species: R. wrayi

Binomial name
- Rhododendron wrayi King & Gamble

Synonyms
- Rhododendron coruscum Ridl.; Rhododendron dubium King & Gamble; Rhododendron wrayi var. minus Ridl.

Species of plant

Rhododendron wrayi is a species of flowering plant in the family Ericaceae. It is endemic to Peninsular Malaysia.
