= Madhuca obtusifolia =

Conservation status
- Data Deficient (IUCN 2.3)

Scientific classification
- Kingdom: Plantae
- Clade: Tracheophytes
- Clade: Angiosperms
- Clade: Eudicots
- Clade: Asterids
- Order: Ericales
- Family: Sapotaceae
- Genus: Madhuca
- Species: M. obtusifolia

Binomial name
- Madhuca obtusifolia (King & Gamble) P.Royen

Synonyms
- Payena obtusifolia King & Gamble

Species of tree

Madhuca obtusifolia is a species of plant in the family Sapotaceae. It is a tree endemic to Peninsular Malaysia.
