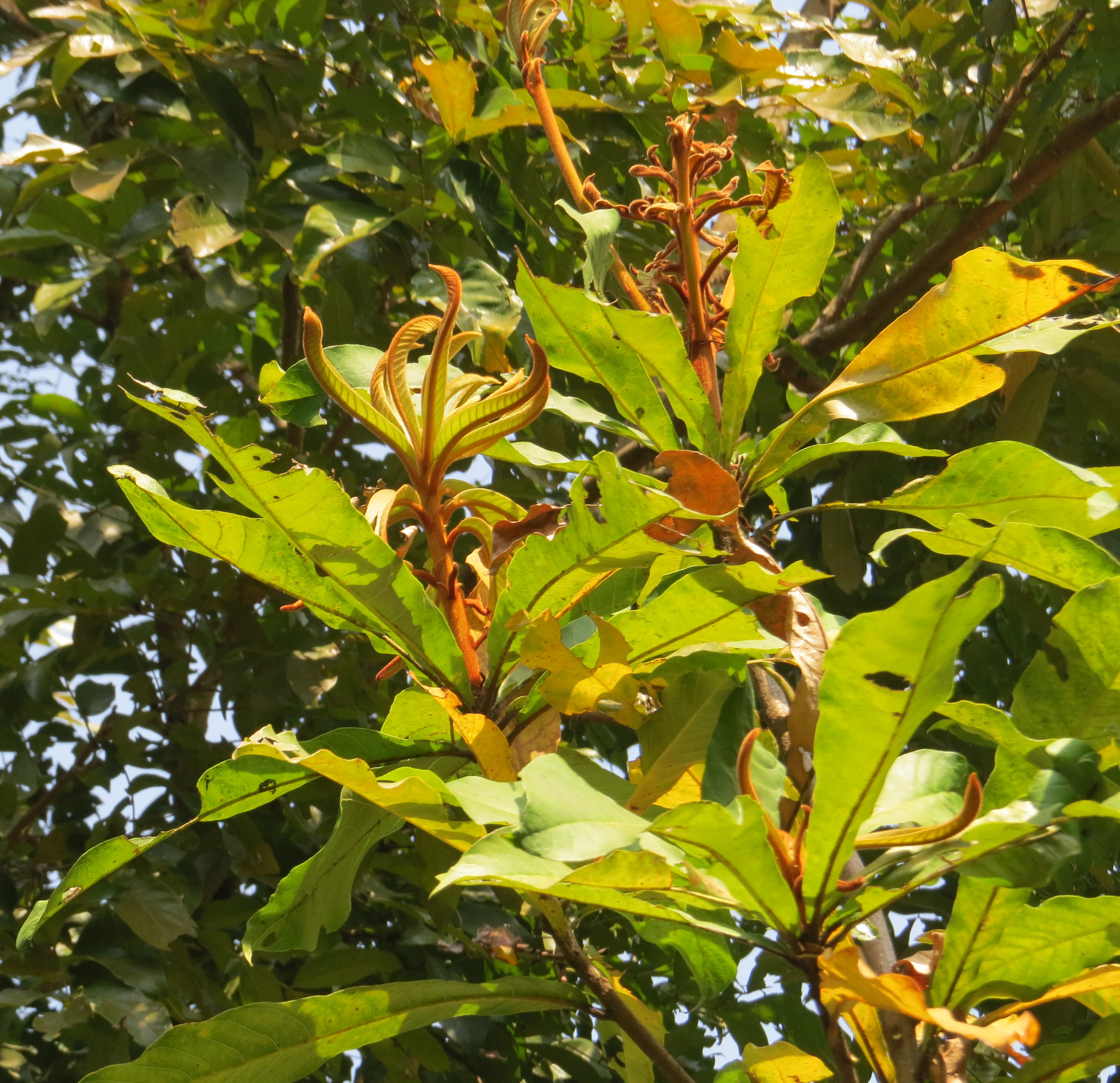

Conservation status
- Endangered (IUCN 2.3)

Scientific classification
- Kingdom: Plantae
- Clade: Tracheophytes
- Clade: Angiosperms
- Clade: Eudicots
- Clade: Asterids
- Order: Ericales
- Family: Sapotaceae
- Genus: Madhuca
- Species: M. bourdillonii

Binomial name
- Madhuca bourdillonii (Gamble) H.J.Lam

Synonyms
- Bassia bourdillonii Gamble

= Madhuca bourdillonii =

Species of flowering plant

Madhuca bourdillonii is a species of flowering plant in the family Sapotaceae. It is endemic to India, where it is known only from Kerala. Recent surveys failed to locate any specimens. The species has been exploited for its wood.
