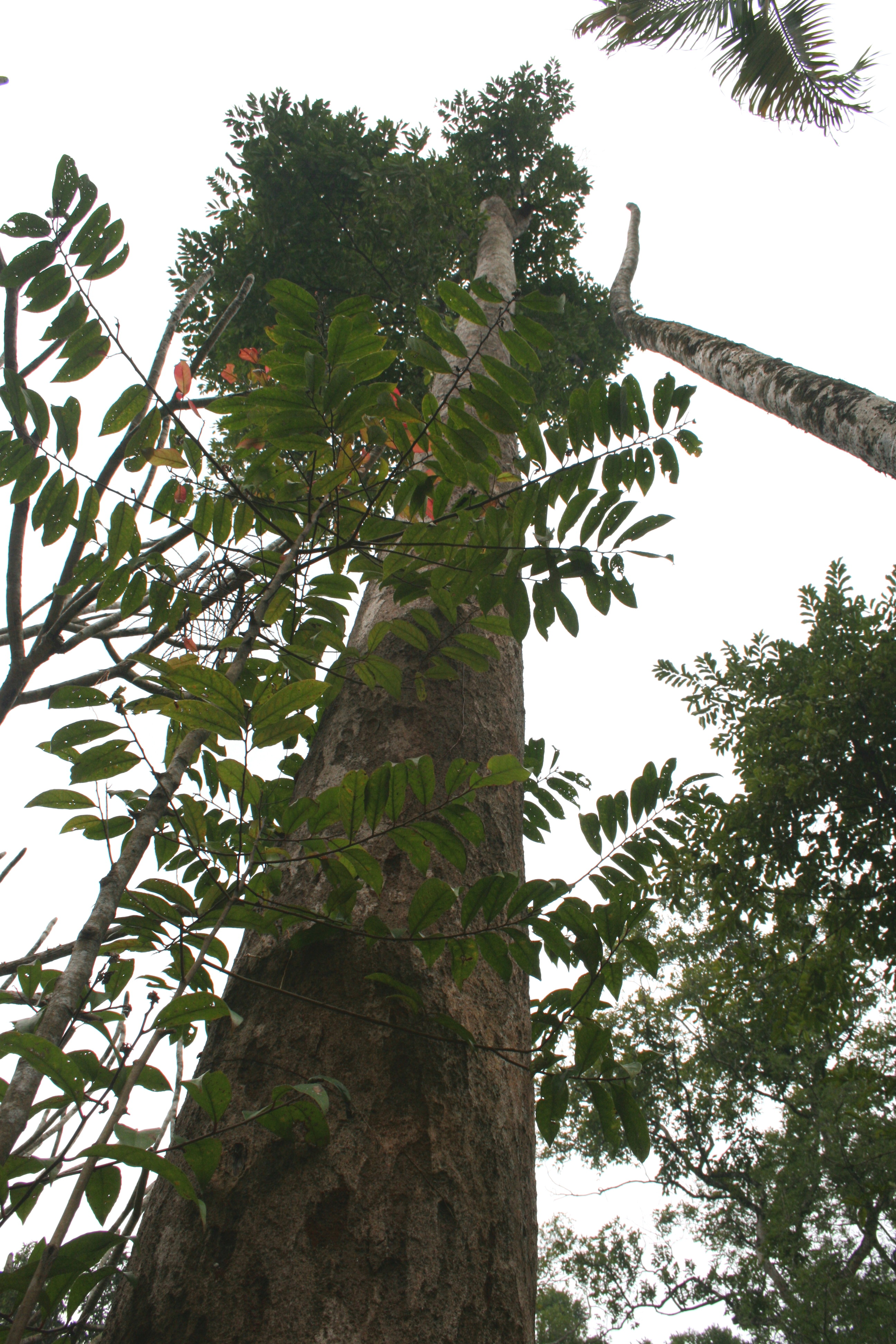
- Madhuca pasquieri

Scientific classification
- Kingdom: Plantae
- Clade: Tracheophytes
- Clade: Angiosperms
- Clade: Eudicots
- Clade: Asterids
- Order: Ericales
- Family: Sapotaceae
- Subfamily: Sapotoideae
- Genus: Madhuca; J.F.Gmel.

Type species
- Madhuca indica J.F. Gmel.

Synonyms
- Bassia J.Koenig ex L. 1771, illegitimate homonym not Bassia All. 1766. (Amaranthaceae); Aesandra Pierre; Azaola Blanco; Kakosmanthus Hassk.; Cacosmanthus Miq.; Dasyaulus Thwaites; Aesandra Pierre ex L.Planch.; Illipe F.Muell.; Vidoricum Rumph. ex Kuntze; Ganua Pierre ex Dubard; Dasillipe Dubard

= Madhuca =

Genus of flowering plants

Madhuca is a genus of plants in the family Sapotaceae first described as a genus in 1791.

Madhuca is native to south, east, and southeast Asia and Papuasia (from India to China to New Guinea).

== Species ==
Plants of the World Online currently lists more than 110 species:

- Madhuca alpina (A.Chev. ex Lecomte) A.Chev.
- Madhuca aristulata (King & Gamble) H.J.Lam
- Madhuca aspera H.J.Lam
- Madhuca barbata T.D.Penn.
- Madhuca bejaudii Aubrév.
- Madhuca betis (Blanco) J.F.Macbr.
- Madhuca boerlageana (Burck) Baehni
- Madhuca borneensis P.Royen
- Madhuca bourdillonii (Gamble) H.J.Lam
- Madhuca brochidodroma T.D.Penn.
- Madhuca burckiana (Koord.) H.J.Lam
- Madhuca butyrospermoides A.Chev.
- Madhuca calcicola P.Royen
- Madhuca chai-ananii Chantar.
- Madhuca cheongiana Yii & P.Chai
- Madhuca chiangmaiensis Chantar.
- Madhuca clavata Jayas.
- Madhuca cochinchinensis (Pierre ex Dubard) H.J.Lam
- Madhuca coriacea (Merr.) Merr.
- Madhuca costulata (Pierre ex Dubard) H.J.Lam
- Madhuca crassipes (Pierre ex Becc.) H.J.Lam
- Madhuca cuneata (Blume) J.F.Macbr.
- Madhuca cuprea (King & Gamble) H.J.Lam
- Madhuca curtisii (King & Gamble) Ridl.
- Madhuca daemonica (Assem) Yii & P.Chai
- Madhuca decipiens J.Sinclair
- Madhuca diplostemon (C.B.Clarke) P.Royen
- Madhuca dongnaiensis (Pierre) Baehni
- Madhuca dubardii H.J.Lam
- Madhuca elliptica (Pierre ex Dubard) H.J.Lam
- Madhuca elmeri Merr. ex H.J.Lam
- Madhuca endertii H.J.Lam
- Madhuca engkikiana Yii & P.Chai
- Madhuca engleri (Merr.) Vink
- Madhuca erythrophylla (King & Gamble) H.J.Lam
- Madhuca esculenta Fletcher
- Madhuca firma (Pierre ex Dubard) H.J.Lam
- Madhuca floribunda (Pierre ex Dubard) H.J.Lam
- Madhuca fulva (Thwaites) J.F.Macbr.
- Madhuca fusca (Engl.) Forman
- Madhuca glabrescens H.J.Lam
- Madhuca hainanensis Chun & F.C.How
- Madhuca heynei H.J.Lam
- Madhuca hirtiflora (Ridl.) H.J.Lam
- Madhuca insignis (Radlk.) H.J.Lam
- Madhuca kingiana (Brace ex King & Gamble) H.J.Lam
- Madhuca klackenbergii Chantar.
- Madhuca kompongsonensis Aubrév.
- Madhuca korthalsii (Pierre ex Burck) H.J.Lam
- Madhuca krabiensis (Aubrév.) Chantar.
- Madhuca kuchingensis Yii & P.Chai
- Madhuca kunstleri (Brace ex King & Gamble) H.J.Lam
- Madhuca lanceolata (Merr.) Merr.
- Madhuca lancifolia (Burck) H.J.Lam
- Madhuca lanuginosa Ridl.
- Madhuca laurifolia (King & Gamble) H.J.Lam
- Madhuca lecomtei (Aubrév.) Chantar.
- Madhuca leucodermis (K.Krause) H.J.Lam
- Madhuca ligulata (H.J.Lam) H.J.Lam
- Madhuca lobbii (C.B.Clarke) H.J.Lam
- Madhuca longifolia (J.Koenig ex L.) J.F.Macbr.
- Madhuca longistyla (King & Gamble) H.J.Lam
- Madhuca macrophylla (Hassk.) H.J.Lam
- Madhuca magnifolia (King ex S.Moore) S.Moore
- Madhuca malaccensis (C.B.Clarke) H.J.Lam
- Madhuca markleeana Yii & P.Chai
- Madhuca microphylla (Hook.) Alston
- Madhuca mindanaensis (Merr.) Merr.
- Madhuca mirandae (Merr.) Merr.
- Madhuca montana P.Royen
- Madhuca monticola (Merr.) Merr.
- Madhuca moonii (Thwaites) H.J.Lam
- Madhuca motleyana (de Vriese) J.F.Macbr.
- Madhuca multiflora (Merr.) J.F.Macbr.
- Madhuca multinervia Yii & P.Chai
- Madhuca neriifolia (Moon) H.J.Lam
- Madhuca oblongifolia (Merr.) Merr.
- Madhuca obovatifolia (Merr.) Merr.
- Madhuca obtusifolia (King & Gamble) P.Royen
- Madhuca ochracea Yii & P.Chai
- Madhuca orientalis (Assem) T.D.Penn.
- Madhuca ovata H.J.Lam
- Madhuca pachyphylla (K.Krause) ined.
- Madhuca palembanica (Miq.) Forman
- Madhuca pallida (Burck) Baehni
- Madhuca pasquieri (Dubard) H.J.Lam
- Madhuca penangiana (King & Gamble) H.J.Lam
- Madhuca penicillata (King & Gamble) H.J.Lam
- Madhuca pierrei (F.N.Williams) H.J.Lam
- Madhuca platyphylla (Merr.) Merr.
- Madhuca primoplagensis Vink
- Madhuca prolixa (Pierre ex Dubard) Yii & P.Chai
- Madhuca pubicalyx Ridl.
- Madhuca punctata H.R.Fletcher
- Madhuca ridleyi H.J.Lam
- Madhuca rufa (King & Gamble) P.Royen
- Madhuca sandakanensis P.Royen
- Madhuca sarawakensis (Pierre ex Dubard) H.J.Lam
- Madhuca selangorica (King & Gamble) J.Sinclair
- Madhuca sepilokensis P.Royen
- Madhuca sericea (Miq.) S.Moore
- Madhuca sessiliflora P.Royen
- Madhuca sessilis (King & Gamble) Baehni
- Madhuca silamensis Yii & P.Chai
- Madhuca smitinandii Chantar.
- Madhuca spectabilis P.Royen
- Madhuca stipulacea H.R.Fletcher
- Madhuca stylosa H.J.Lam
- Madhuca takensis Aubrév.
- Madhuca thorelii (Pierre ex Dubard) H.J.Lam
- Madhuca tomentosa H.J.Lam
- Madhuca tubulosa H.J.Lam
- Madhuca utilis (Ridl.) H.J.Lam
- Madhuca vulcanica (Ridl.) P.Royen
- Madhuca vulpina Vink
- Madhuca woodii P.Royen
