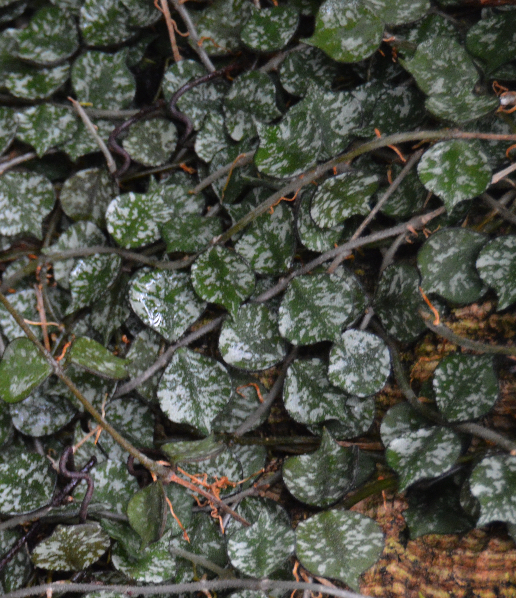
- Hoya curtisii at the United States Botanic Garden

Scientific classification
- Kingdom: Plantae
- Clade: Tracheophytes
- Clade: Angiosperms
- Clade: Eudicots
- Clade: Asterids
- Order: Gentianales
- Family: Apocynaceae
- Genus: Hoya
- Species: H. curtisii

Binomial name
- Hoya curtisii King & Gamble

= Hoya curtisii =

Species of flowering plant

Hoya curtisii is a species of flowering plant in the genus Hoya. It is native to Southeast Asia across Thailand, the Philippines, Borneo, and Malaysia. The species has easily recognizable foliage among Hoyas with small, pointed leaves and silver variegation. Like many Hoyas, it grows as a creeping epiphyte.
