= Madhuca tomentosa =

Conservation status
- Near Threatened (IUCN 2.3)

Scientific classification
- Kingdom: Plantae
- Clade: Tracheophytes
- Clade: Angiosperms
- Clade: Eudicots
- Clade: Asterids
- Order: Ericales
- Family: Sapotaceae
- Genus: Madhuca
- Species: M. tomentosa

Binomial name
- Madhuca tomentosa H.J.Lam

Synonyms
- Madhuca palustris P.Royen

Species of tree

Madhuca tomentosa is a species of flowering plant in the family Sapotaceae. It is a tree endemic to Peninsular Malaysia. It is threatened by habitat loss.
