= Quercus gemelliflora =

Conservation status
- Least Concern (IUCN 3.1)

Scientific classification
- Kingdom: Plantae
- Clade: Embryophytes
- Clade: Tracheophytes
- Clade: Spermatophytes
- Clade: Angiosperms
- Clade: Eudicots
- Clade: Rosids
- Order: Fagales
- Family: Fagaceae
- Genus: Quercus
- Subgenus: Quercus subg. Cerris
- Section: Quercus sect. Cyclobalanopsis
- Species: Q. gemelliflora

Binomial name
- Quercus gemelliflora Blume

Synonyms
- Cyclobalanopsis gemelliflora (Blume) Oerst.; Cyclobalanopsis horsfieldii (Miq.) Oerst.; Cyclobalanopsis merkusii (Endl.) Oerst.; Cyclobalanopsis turbinata (Blume) Schottky; Quercus crassilamellata (Gamble) A.Camus; Quercus horsfieldii Miq.; Quercus horsfieldii var. longifolia Miq.; Quercus lineata var. merkusii (Endl.) Wenz.; Quercus merkusii Endl.; Quercus turbinata Blume; Quercus turbinata var. crassilamellata Gamble

Species of oak tree

Quercus gemelliflora is a tree species in the beech family Fagaceae. there are no known subspecies. It is placed in subgenus Cerris, section Cyclobalanopsis (the ring-cupped oaks). It is native to Peninsular Malaysia, Borneo, Java, and Sumatra.
