= Madhuca sarawakensis =

Conservation status
- Vulnerable (IUCN 3.1)

Scientific classification
- Kingdom: Plantae
- Clade: Embryophytes
- Clade: Tracheophytes
- Clade: Spermatophytes
- Clade: Angiosperms
- Clade: Eudicots
- Clade: Asterids
- Order: Ericales
- Family: Sapotaceae
- Genus: Madhuca
- Species: M. sarawakensis

Binomial name
- Madhuca sarawakensis (Pierre ex Dubard) H.J.Lam

Synonyms
- Kakosmanthus sarawakensis Pierre ex Dubard

Species of flowering plant

Madhuca sarawakensis is a tree in the family Sapotaceae. It is native to Borneo.

== Description ==
Madhuca sarawakensis grows up to 25 m (80 ft) tall, with a trunk diameter of up to 35 cm (14 in). The bark is greyish. Inflorescences bear up to 10 flowers. The fruits are ellipsoid, up to 3.2 cm (1.3 in) long.

== Taxonomy ==
Madhuca sarawakensis was described as Kakosmanthus sarawahensis in 1908 by French botanists Jean Baptiste Louis Pierre in Revue générale de botanique, and later validly by Marcel Dubard in the Bulletin du Muséum national d'histoire naturelle. In 1925, Dutch botanist Herman Johannes Lam transferred the species to the genus Madhuca. The lectotype was collected in Kuching in Sarawak, Borneo. The species is named after Sarawak.

== Distribution and habitat ==
Madhuca sarawakensis is endemic to Borneo, where it is confined to Sarawak's Kuching Division. Its habitat is lowland mixed dipterocarp forest from sea level to 50 m (200 ft) altitude.

== Conservation ==
Madhuca sarawakensis has been assessed as vulnerable on the IUCN Red List. It is threatened by logging and by conversion of its habitat to palm oil plantations. However, the species is present in Semengoh Forest Reserve, affording it a level of protection.
