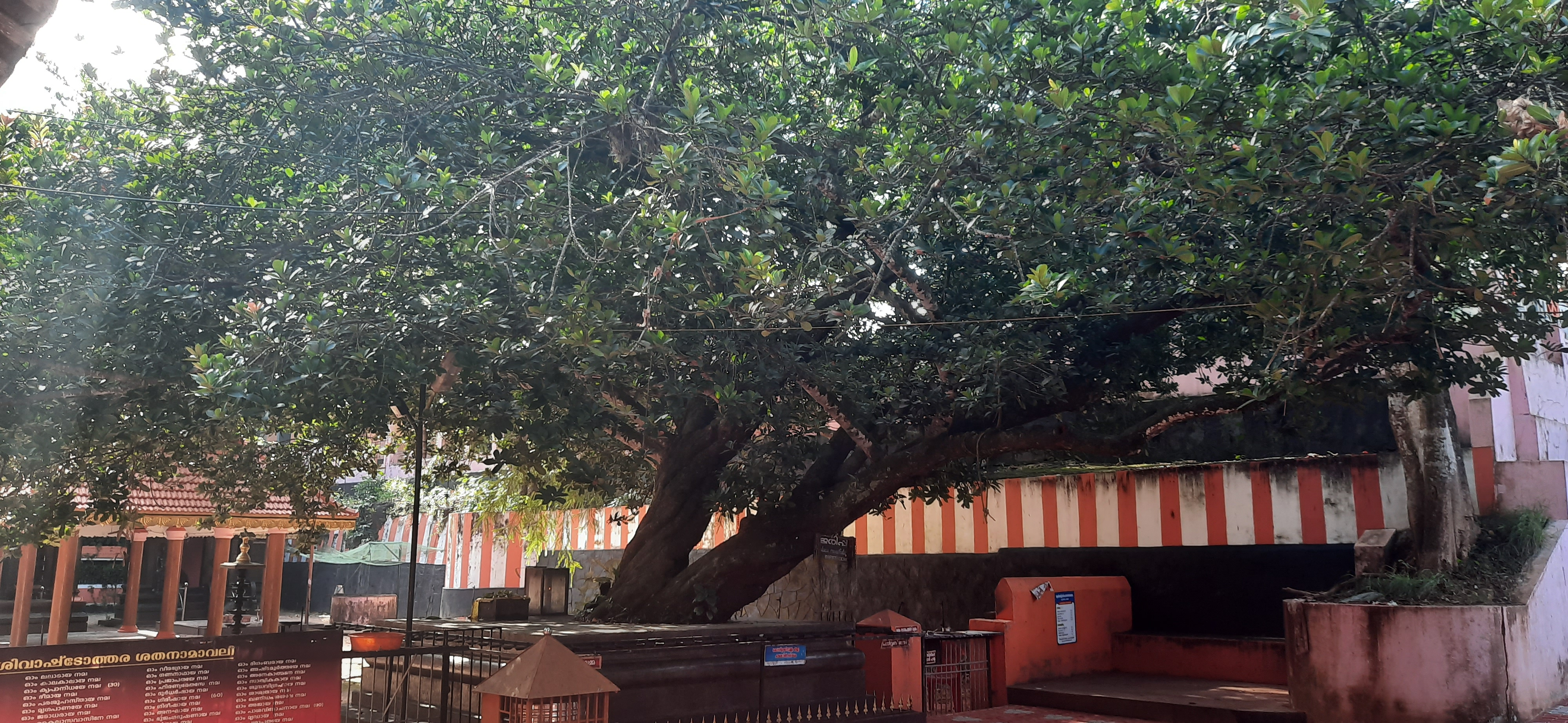

Conservation status
- Critically Endangered (IUCN 3.1)

Scientific classification
- Kingdom: Plantae
- Clade: Tracheophytes
- Clade: Angiosperms
- Clade: Eudicots
- Clade: Asterids
- Order: Ericales
- Family: Sapotaceae
- Genus: Madhuca
- Species: M. diplostemon

Binomial name
- Madhuca diplostemon (C.B.Clarke) P.Royen

= Madhuca diplostemon =

Species of tree

Coordinates: 8.81731°N 76.67998°E

Madhuca diplostemon is a species of flowering plant in the family Sapotaceae, endemic to India. It is a threatened tree species of the Western Ghats whose original specimens were collected in 1835, and it was considered extinct for 184 years until a single living specimen was discovered in a sacred grove in Kollam district, when scientists at the Jawaharlal Nehru Tropical Botanic Garden and Research Institute (JNTBGRI) identified the tree as Madhuca diplostemon rather than the common attilippa (Madhuca neriifolia).

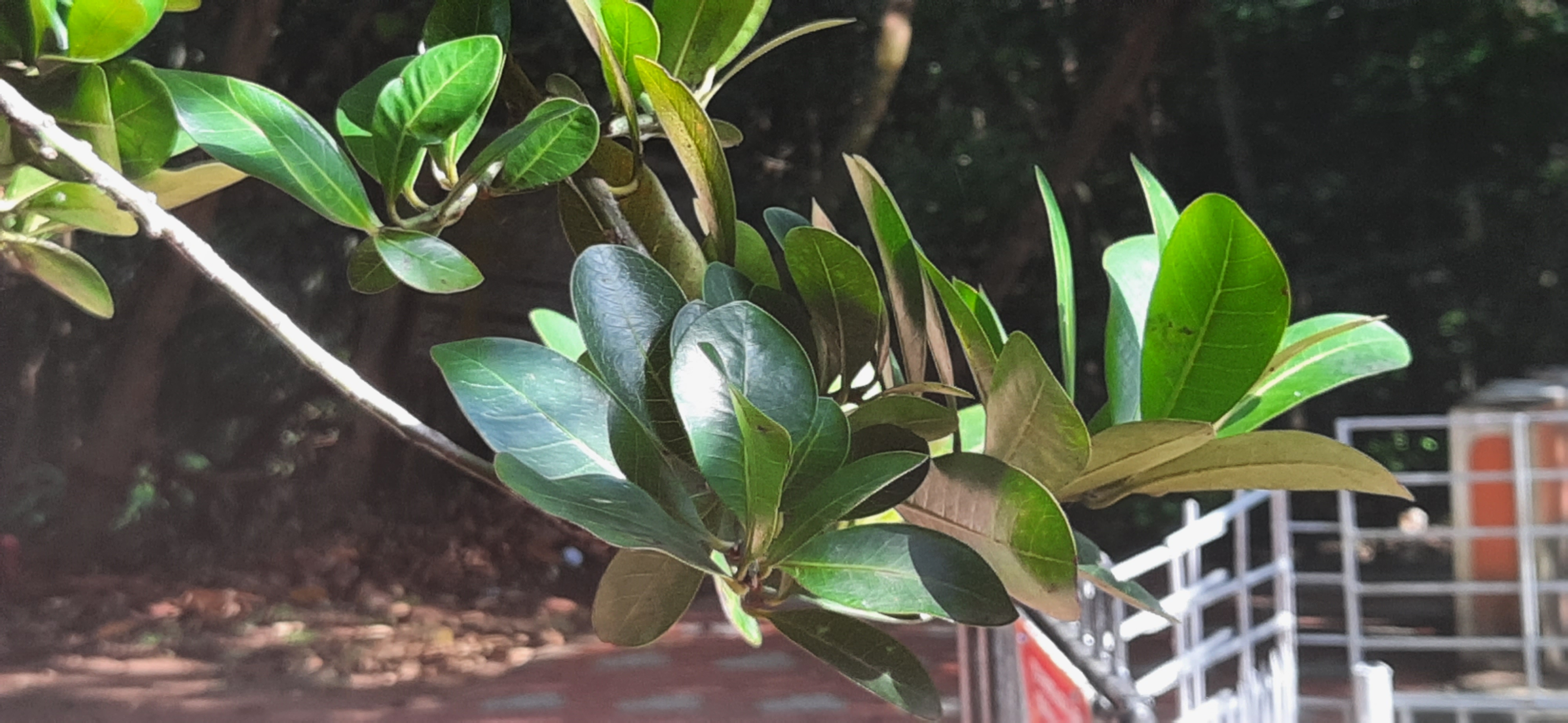
Leaf

The lone mature tree is located at the Koonayil Ayiravilli Shiva temple at Paravur, Kollam, Kerala. Surveys in other sacred groves in Kollam district failed to find another tree of the species. Since the species is represented by only one specimen in a single locality, it is eligible to be categorized as 'Critically Endangered' by the IUCN (International Union for Conservation of Nature), the JNTBGRI has noted.
