= Madhuca crassipes =

Conservation status
- Near Threatened (IUCN 3.1)

Scientific classification
- Kingdom: Plantae
- Clade: Embryophytes
- Clade: Tracheophytes
- Clade: Angiosperms
- Clade: Eudicots
- Clade: Asterids
- Order: Ericales
- Family: Sapotaceae
- Genus: Madhuca
- Species: M. crassipes

Binomial name
- Madhuca crassipes (Pierre ex Becc.) H.J.Lam

Synonyms
- Bassia crassipes Pierre ex Becc.; Croixia crassipes (Pierre ex Becc.) Baehni; Illipe crassipes (Pierre ex Becc.) Pierre ex Dubard

Species of flowering plant

Madhuca crassipes is a plant in the family Sapotaceae. The specific epithet crassipes means 'thick foot or stalk', referring to the fruit stalk.

== Description ==
Madhuca crassipes grows as a tree up to 40 metres (130 ft) tall, with a trunk diameter of up to 70 cm (28 in). The bark is brown, mottled grey. Inflorescences bear up to 10 flowers which are fragrant and cream-coloured.

== Distribution and habitat ==
Madhuca crassipes is native to Sumatra and Borneo. Its habitat is swamps and forests to 1,000 m (3,000 ft) altitude.

== Conservation ==
Madhuca crassipes has been assessed as near threatened on the IUCN Red List. The species is threatened by logging and conversion of land for palm oil plantations.
