= Madhuca burckiana =

Conservation status
- Least Concern (IUCN 3.1)

Scientific classification
- Kingdom: Plantae
- Clade: Embryophytes
- Clade: Tracheophytes
- Clade: Angiosperms
- Clade: Eudicots
- Clade: Asterids
- Order: Ericales
- Family: Sapotaceae
- Genus: Madhuca
- Species: M. burckiana

Binomial name
- Madhuca burckiana (Koord.) H.J.Lam

Synonyms
- Manglietia minahassae Koord. & Valeton; Bassia cagayanensis Merr.; Illipe burckiana Koord.; Illipe schlechteri K.Krause; Isonandra burckiana (Koord.) Baehni; Madhuca fusicarpa Elmer Merr.; Payena fusicarpa Elmer

Species of flowering plant

Madhuca burckiana is a plant in the family Sapotaceae.

== Description ==
Madhuca burckiana grows as a tree up to 15 metres (50 ft) tall, with a trunk diameter of up to 20 cm (8 in). The bark is greyish brown. Inflorescences bear up to 10 flowers.

== Distribution and habitat ==
Madhuca burckiana is native to Sumatra, Borneo, Sulawesi, the Maluku Islands, the Philippines and New Guinea. Its habitat is mixed dipterocarp forest to 1,000 m (3,000 ft) altitude.
