= Madhuca hirtiflora =

Conservation status
- Vulnerable (IUCN 3.1)

Scientific classification
- Kingdom: Plantae
- Clade: Embryophytes
- Clade: Tracheophytes
- Clade: Angiosperms
- Clade: Eudicots
- Clade: Asterids
- Order: Ericales
- Family: Sapotaceae
- Genus: Madhuca
- Species: M. hirtiflora

Binomial name
- Madhuca hirtiflora (Ridl.) H.J.Lam

Synonyms
- Bassia hirtiflora Ridl.; Ganua hirtiflora (Ridl.) P.Royen

Species of flowering plant

Madhuca hirtiflora is a plant in the family Sapotaceae. The specific epithet hirtiflora means 'hairy flowers'.

== Description ==
Madhuca hirtiflora grows as a tree up to 15 metres (50 ft) tall, with a trunk diameter of up to 15 cm (6 in). Its bark is greyish brown. Inflorescences bear up to six flowers. The fruit is greyish, ellipsoid, up to 2.5 cm (1 in) long.

== Distribution and habitat ==
Madhuca hirtiflora is native to Sumatra, Peninsular Malaysia and Borneo. Its habitat is lowland mixed dipterocarp forest from 50–700 m (200–2,300 ft) altitude.

== Conservation ==
Madhuca hirtiflora has been assessed as vulnerable on the IUCN Red List. The species is threatened by logging and conversion of land for palm oil plantations.
