= Madhuca endertii =

Conservation status
- Vulnerable (IUCN 3.1)

Scientific classification
- Kingdom: Plantae
- Clade: Embryophytes
- Clade: Tracheophytes
- Clade: Angiosperms
- Clade: Eudicots
- Clade: Asterids
- Order: Ericales
- Family: Sapotaceae
- Genus: Madhuca
- Species: M. endertii

Binomial name
- Madhuca endertii H.J.Lam

Species of flowering plant

Madhuca endertii is a species of flowering plant in the family Sapotaceae.

== Description ==
Madhuca endertii grows as a tree up to 30 metres (100 ft) tall, with a trunk diameter of up to 60 cm (24 in). Inflorescences bear up to three flowers. The fruits are ellipsoid, up to 4.5 cm (2 in) long.

== Distribution and habitat ==
Madhuca endertii is endemic to Borneo. Its habitat is montane forests from 800–3,700 m (3,000–12,000 ft) altitude.

== Conservation ==
Madhuca endertii has been assessed as vulnerable on the IUCN Red List. The species is threatened by logging and conversion of land for palm oil plantations.
