= Madhuca insignis =

Conservation status
- Critically Endangered (IUCN 3.1)

Scientific classification
- Kingdom: Plantae
- Clade: Tracheophytes
- Clade: Angiosperms
- Clade: Eudicots
- Clade: Asterids
- Order: Ericales
- Family: Sapotaceae
- Genus: Madhuca
- Species: M. insignis

Binomial name
- Madhuca insignis (Radlk.) H.J.Lam

Species of flowering plant

Madhuca insignis is a species of plant in the family Sapotaceae. It is endemic to India. It had been declared extinct due to habitat loss. However, a Madhuca insignis population has been rediscovered along the banks of the river Kumaradhara, in Dakshina Kannada region of Karnataka state, India. The area is the proposed site for the Kukke I and Kukke II hydel power projects. Restoration efforts of the species are being attempted.
