= Madhuca glabrescens =

Conservation status
- Vulnerable (IUCN 3.1)

Scientific classification
- Kingdom: Plantae
- Clade: Embryophytes
- Clade: Tracheophytes
- Clade: Angiosperms
- Clade: Eudicots
- Clade: Asterids
- Order: Ericales
- Family: Sapotaceae
- Genus: Madhuca
- Species: M. glabrescens

Binomial name
- Madhuca glabrescens H.J.Lam

Species of flowering plant

Madhuca glabrescens is a species of flowering plant in the family Sapotaceae. The specific epithet glabrescens means 'becoming glabrous', referring to the leaves.

== Description ==
Madhuca glabrescens grows as a tree up to 25 metres (80 ft) tall, with a trunk diameter of up to 40 cm (16 in). The bark is reddish brown. Inflorescences bear up to six flowers. The fruit is yellowish-brown, ellipsoid, up to 10 cm (4 in) long.

== Distribution and habitat ==
Madhuca glabrescens is endemic to Borneo. Its habitat is lowland mixed dipterocarp forest, to 1,360 m (4,000 ft) altitude.

== Conservation ==
Madhuca glabrescens has been assessed as vulnerable on the IUCN Red List. The species is threatened by logging and conversion of land for palm oil plantations.
