= M. ridleyi =

M. ridleyi may refer to:

- Madhuca ridleyi, a plant species endemic to Malaysia
- Myotis ridleyi, the Ridley's bat, a vesper bat species found in Indonesia and Malaysia

== See also ==
- Henry Nicholas Ridley
