= Madhuca lancifolia =

Conservation status
- Vulnerable (IUCN 3.1)

Scientific classification
- Kingdom: Plantae
- Clade: Embryophytes
- Clade: Tracheophytes
- Clade: Angiosperms
- Clade: Eudicots
- Clade: Asterids
- Order: Ericales
- Family: Sapotaceae
- Genus: Madhuca
- Species: M. lancifolia

Binomial name
- Madhuca lancifolia (Burck) H.J.Lam

Species of tree

Madhuca lancifolia is a tree in the family Sapotaceae. The specific epithet lancifolia means 'lance-shaped leaves'.

== Description ==
Madhuca lancifolia grows up to 14 metres (50 ft) tall, with a trunk diameter of up to 15 cm (6 in). The bark is brown. Inflorescences bear up to 10 flowers.

== Distribution and habitat ==
Madhuca lancifolia is endemic to Borneo. Its habitat is lowland mixed dipterocarp forest.

== Conservation ==
Madhuca lancifolia has been assessed as vulnerable on the IUCN Red List. The species is threatened by logging and conversion of land for palm oil plantations.
