= Madhuca costulata =

Conservation status
- Vulnerable (IUCN 3.1)

Scientific classification
- Kingdom: Plantae
- Clade: Embryophytes
- Clade: Tracheophytes
- Clade: Angiosperms
- Clade: Eudicots
- Clade: Asterids
- Order: Ericales
- Family: Sapotaceae
- Genus: Madhuca
- Species: M. costulata

Binomial name
- Madhuca costulata (Pierre ex Dubard) H.J.Lam

Synonyms
- Kakosmanthus costulatus Pierre ex Dubard

Species of flowering plant

Madhuca costulata is a plant in the family Sapotaceae. The specific epithet costulata means 'finely ribbed', referring to the leaves.

== Description ==
Madhuca costulata grows as a tree up to 8 metres (30 ft) tall, with a trunk diameter of up to 10 cm (4 in). The bark is greyish. Inflorescences bear up to six flowers.

== Distribution and habitat ==
Madhuca costulata is endemic to Borneo. Its habitat is mixed dipterocarp forests to 300 m (1,000 ft) altitude.

== Conservation ==
Madhuca costulata has been assessed as vulnerable on the IUCN Red List. The species is threatened by logging and conversion of land for palm oil plantations.
