= Madhuca monticola =

Conservation status
- Data Deficient (IUCN 3.1)

Scientific classification
- Kingdom: Plantae
- Clade: Embryophytes
- Clade: Tracheophytes
- Clade: Spermatophytes
- Clade: Angiosperms
- Clade: Eudicots
- Clade: Asterids
- Order: Ericales
- Family: Sapotaceae
- Genus: Madhuca
- Species: M. monticola

Binomial name
- Madhuca monticola (Merr.) Merr.

Synonyms
- Bassia monticola Merr.; Ganua monticola (Merr.) H.J.Lam ex Assem

Species of tree

Madhuca monticola is a tree in the family Sapotaceae. The twigs are greyish. Inflorescences bear up to eight flowers. The specific epithet monticola is from the Latin meaning 'mountain dweller', referring to the habitat. M. monticola is found in Borneo and the Philippines.
