= Madhuca utilis =

Conservation status
- Endangered (IUCN 3.1)

Scientific classification
- Kingdom: Plantae
- Clade: Embryophytes
- Clade: Tracheophytes
- Clade: Angiosperms
- Clade: Eudicots
- Clade: Asterids
- Order: Ericales
- Family: Sapotaceae
- Genus: Madhuca
- Species: M. utilis

Binomial name
- Madhuca utilis (Ridl.) H.J.Lam

Synonyms
- Isonandra utilis (Ridl.) Baehni; Madhuca stenophylla H.J.Lam; Payena utilis Ridl.

Species of tree

Madhuca utilis is a tree in the family Sapotaceae. The specific epithet utilis means 'useful', referring to the timber.

== Description ==
Madhuca utilis grows up to 40 metres (130 ft) tall, with a trunk diameter of up to 70 cm (30 in). The bark is greyish brown. The fruits are ellipsoid, up to 5.5 cm (2 in) long.

== Distribution and habitat ==
Madhuca utilis is native to Peninsular Malaysia and Borneo. Its habitat is swamps and lowland kerangas forests from 18–520 m (100–1,700 ft).

== Conservation ==
Madhuca utilis has been assessed as endangered on the IUCN Red List. The species is threatened by logging and conversion of land for palm oil plantations.
