= Madhuca dubardii =

Conservation status
- Near Threatened (IUCN 3.1)

Scientific classification
- Kingdom: Plantae
- Clade: Embryophytes
- Clade: Tracheophytes
- Clade: Angiosperms
- Clade: Eudicots
- Clade: Asterids
- Order: Ericales
- Family: Sapotaceae
- Genus: Madhuca
- Species: M. dubardii

Binomial name
- Madhuca dubardii H.J.Lam

Synonyms
- Madhuca dubardii var. lanceolata H.J.Lam

Species of flowering plant

Madhuca dubardii is a species of flowering plant in the family Sapotaceae.

== Description ==
Madhuca dubardii grows as a tree up to 16 metres (50 ft) tall, with a trunk diameter of up to 40 cm (16 in). The bark is reddish brown. Inflorescences bear up to four flowers. The fruit is greyish-brown, ellipsoid, up to 3 cm (1 in) long.

== Distribution and habitat ==
Madhuca dubardii grows naturally in Sumatra, Peninsular Malaysia and Borneo. Its habitat is lowland mixed dipterocarp forests from 40–200 m (100–700 ft) altitude.

== Conservation ==
Madhuca dubardii has been assessed as near threatened on the IUCN Red List. The species is threatened by logging and conversion of land for palm oil plantations.
