= Madhuca pallida =

Conservation status
- Near Threatened (IUCN 3.1)

Scientific classification
- Kingdom: Plantae
- Clade: Embryophytes
- Clade: Tracheophytes
- Clade: Angiosperms
- Clade: Eudicots
- Clade: Asterids
- Order: Ericales
- Family: Sapotaceae
- Genus: Madhuca
- Species: M. pallida

Binomial name
- Madhuca pallida (Burck) Baehni

Synonyms
- Bassia pallida Burck; Ganua pallida (Burck) H.J.Lam; Illipe pallida (Burck) Engl.; Vidoricum pallidum (Burck) Kuntze

Species of tree

Madhuca pallida is a tree in the family Sapotaceae. The specific epithet pallida means 'pale in colour', referring to the leaves.

== Description ==
Madhuca pallida grows up to 16 metres (50 ft) tall, with a trunk diameter of up to 30 cm (12 in). The bark is dark brown. Inflorescences bear up to eight bright yellowish-green flowers.

== Distribution and habitat ==
Madhuca pallida is native to Sumatra and Borneo. Its habitat is mixed dipterocarp forest to 1,800 m (6,000 ft) altitude.

== Conservation ==
Madhuca pallida has been assessed as near threatened on the IUCN Red List. The species is threatened by logging and conversion of land for palm oil plantations.
