= Madhuca elmeri =

Conservation status
- Endangered (IUCN 3.1)

Scientific classification
- Kingdom: Plantae
- Clade: Embryophytes
- Clade: Tracheophytes
- Clade: Angiosperms
- Clade: Eudicots
- Clade: Asterids
- Order: Ericales
- Family: Sapotaceae
- Genus: Madhuca
- Species: M. elmeri

Binomial name
- Madhuca elmeri Merr. ex H.J.Lam

Species of flowering plant

Madhuca elmeri is a species of flowering plant in the family Sapotaceae. It is named for the American botanist and plant collector Adolph Elmer who worked extensively in the Philippines and Borneo.

== Description ==
Madhuca elmeri grows as a tree up to 20 metres (70 ft) tall, with a trunk diameter of up to 30 cm (12 in). The bark is greyish brown. Inflorescences bear up to five flowers.

== Distribution and habitat ==
Madhuca elmeri is endemic to Borneo where it is confined to the east coast of Sabah. Its habitat is lowland mixed dipterocarp forests to 106 m (348 ft) altitude.

== Conservation ==
Madhuca elmeri has been assessed as endangered on the IUCN Red List. The species is threatened by logging and conversion of land for palm oil plantations.
