= Quercus argentata =

Conservation status
- Least Concern (IUCN 3.1)

Scientific classification
- Kingdom: Plantae
- Clade: Tracheophytes
- Clade: Angiosperms
- Clade: Eudicots
- Clade: Rosids
- Order: Fagales
- Family: Fagaceae
- Genus: Quercus
- Subgenus: Quercus subg. Cerris
- Section: Quercus sect. Cyclobalanopsis
- Species: Q. argentata

Binomial name
- Quercus argentata Korth.

Synonyms
- Cyclobalanopsis argentata (Korth.) Oerst.; Lithocarpus argentatus (Korth.) Merr.; Pasania pinanga (Blume) Oerst.; Quercus pinanga Blume; Quercus wilhelminae Seemen; Synaedrys wilhelminae (Seemen) Koidz.

Species of oak tree

Quercus argentata is an evergreen tropical oak species in the beech family Fagaceae. There are no known subspecies. It is placed in subgenus Cerris, section Cyclobalanopsis. It derived its name from the silvery hairs on the lower surface of its leaves.

The species is distributed in Borneo, Sumatra including Bangka, the peninsula of Malaysia, and western Java. It can grow 10 meters and up heights of 40 meters.

The species was first described by Pieter Willem Korthals in 1842.

== Distribution and habitat ==
Quercus argentata is native to the islands of Sumatra, Borneo (though absent in Brunei), and Western Java, as well as to Peninsular Malaysia. This oak is found on Mount Kinabalu in lower montane forests up to an elevation of 2,700 m above sea level.

It occurs up to 3,350 meters above sea level in lowland mixed dipterocarp to montane forests, but is most commonly found between 600-1,500 meters on sandy clay or sandy loam soils.

Within its region can be found 20-25 other Quercus species with Q. nivea being most similar in appearance and distribution.
