= Madhuca multinervia =

Conservation status
- Endangered (IUCN 3.1)

Scientific classification
- Kingdom: Plantae
- Clade: Tracheophytes
- Clade: Angiosperms
- Clade: Eudicots
- Clade: Asterids
- Order: Ericales
- Family: Sapotaceae
- Genus: Madhuca
- Species: M. multinervia

Binomial name
- Madhuca multinervia Yii & P.Chai

Species of tree

Madhuca multinervia is a tree in the family Sapotaceae, native to Borneo. The specific epithet multinervia means 'many-veined', referring to the leaves.

== Description ==
Madhuca multinervia grows up to 20 m (70 ft) tall, with a trunk diameter of up to 40 cm (16 in). The bark is pale brown, mottled grey. Its Inflorescences bear up to 10 flowers. The fruits are ellipsoid, up to 2.1 cm (0.8 in) long.

== Distribution and habitat ==
Madhuca multinervia is endemic to Borneo, where it is confined to Sabah. Its habitat is lowland mixed dipterocarp forest, on hills at elevations of 200–300 m (700–1,000 ft).

== Conservation ==
Madhuca multinervia has been assessed as endangered on the IUCN Red List. It is primarily threatened by conversion of land in its habitat for palm oil plantations. It is also threatened by harvesting for its timber. The species does occur in some protected areas.
