= Semecarpus lineatus =

Conservation status
- Endangered (IUCN 3.1)

Scientific classification
- Kingdom: Plantae
- Clade: Embryophytes
- Clade: Tracheophytes
- Clade: Spermatophytes
- Clade: Angiosperms
- Clade: Eudicots
- Clade: Rosids
- Order: Sapindales
- Family: Anacardiaceae
- Genus: Semecarpus
- Species: S. lineatus

Binomial name
- Semecarpus lineatus Kosterm.

Species of flowering plant

Semecarpus lineatus is a flowering plant in the family Anacardiaceae. It is native to Borneo.

== Description ==
Semecarpus lineatus grows as a tree up to 5 m (20 ft) tall, with a stem diameter of up to 10 cm (4 in). The twigs are furrowed. The leaves measure up to 43 cm (17 in) long and to 2 cm (0.8 in) wide. The inflorescences, in panicles, feature green flowers.

== Taxonomy ==
Semecarpus lineatus was described by Indonesian botanist André Kostermans in Blumea in 1988. The type specimen was collected in Lahad Datu in Sabah, Borneo. The specific epithet lineatus means 'with fine lines', referring to the twigs.

== Distribution and habitat ==
Semecarpus lineatus is endemic to Borneo, where it is confined to Mount Silam and the Danum Valley in Sabah. Its habitat is in hill forests, at elevations of 30–600 m (100–2,000 ft).

== Conservation ==
Semecarpus lineatus has been assessed as endangered on the IUCN Red List. It is threatened by forest fires and by conversion of its habitat for agriculture. However the species is present in two protected areas: Sungai Taliwas and Sapagaya Forest Reserves.
