= Madhuca cheongiana =

Conservation status
- Vulnerable (IUCN 3.1)

Scientific classification
- Kingdom: Plantae
- Clade: Embryophytes
- Clade: Tracheophytes
- Clade: Angiosperms
- Clade: Eudicots
- Clade: Asterids
- Order: Ericales
- Family: Sapotaceae
- Genus: Madhuca
- Species: M. cheongiana

Binomial name
- Madhuca cheongiana Yii & P.Chai

Synonyms
- Ganua sarawakensis Pierre ex Dubard

Species of flowering plant

Madhuca cheongiana is a plant in the family Sapotaceae.

== Description ==
Madhuca cheongiana grows as a tree up to 30 metres (100 ft) tall, with a trunk diameter of up to 50 cm (20 in). The bark is brown. Inflorescences bear up to 10 white flowers.

== Distribution and habitat ==
Madhuca cheongiana is endemic to Borneo. Its habitat is mixed dipterocarp and kerangas forests to 250 m (800 ft) altitude.

== Conservation ==
Madhuca cheongiana has been assessed as vulnerable on the IUCN Red List. The species is threatened by logging and conversion of land for palm oil plantations.
