= Madhuca barbata =

Conservation status
- Near Threatened (IUCN 3.1)

Scientific classification
- Kingdom: Plantae
- Clade: Embryophytes
- Clade: Tracheophytes
- Clade: Angiosperms
- Clade: Eudicots
- Clade: Asterids
- Order: Ericales
- Family: Sapotaceae
- Genus: Madhuca
- Species: M. barbata

Binomial name
- Madhuca barbata T.D.Penn.

Synonyms
- Ganua pierrei Assem

Species of flowering plant

Madhuca barbata is a plant in the family Sapotaceae. The specific epithet barbata means 'bearded', referring to the sepals.

== Description ==
Madhuca barbata grows as a small tree. Inflorescences bear up to 12 flowers.

== Distribution and habitat ==
Madhuca barbata is endemic to Borneo. Its habitat is peat swamp and mixed dipterocarp forests to 300 m (1,000 ft) altitude.

== Conservation ==
Madhuca barbata has been assessed as near threatened on the IUCN Red List. The species is threatened by conversion of land for palm oil plantations.
