= Madhuca montana =

Conservation status
- Endangered (IUCN 3.1)

Scientific classification
- Kingdom: Plantae
- Clade: Tracheophytes
- Clade: Angiosperms
- Clade: Eudicots
- Clade: Asterids
- Order: Ericales
- Family: Sapotaceae
- Genus: Madhuca
- Species: M. montana

Binomial name
- Madhuca montana P.Royen

Species of tree

Madhuca montana is a tree in the family Sapotaceae. The specific epithet montana means 'of the mountains', referring to its habitat.

== Description ==
Madhuca montana grows up to 33 metres (100 ft) tall, with a trunk diameter of up to 55 cm (20 in). The twigs are brownish. Inflorescences bear up to three flowers.

== Distribution and habitat ==
Madhuca montana is endemic to Borneo. Its habitat is montane forests from 1,210–4,000 m (4,000–13,000 ft) altitude.

== Conservation ==
Madhuca montana has been assessed as endangered on the IUCN Red List. The species is threatened by logging and conversion of land for palm oil plantations.
