= Madhuca spectabilis =

Conservation status
- Endangered (IUCN 3.1)

Scientific classification
- Kingdom: Plantae
- Clade: Embryophytes
- Clade: Tracheophytes
- Clade: Angiosperms
- Clade: Eudicots
- Clade: Asterids
- Order: Ericales
- Family: Sapotaceae
- Genus: Madhuca
- Species: M. spectabilis

Binomial name
- Madhuca spectabilis P.Royen

Species of tree

Madhuca spectabilis is a tree in the family Sapotaceae. The specific epithet spectabilis means 'spectacular', referring to the tree's appearance.

== Description ==
Madhuca spectabilis grows up to 26 metres (90 ft) tall, with a trunk diameter of up to 40 cm (16 in). Inflorescences bear eight or more flowers.

== Distribution and habitat ==
Madhuca spectabilis is endemic to Borneo. Its habitat is lowland mixed dipterocarp forest from 30–450 m (100–1,500 ft) altitude.

== Conservation ==
Madhuca spectabilis has been assessed as endangered on the IUCN Red List. The species is threatened by logging and conversion of land for palm oil plantations.
