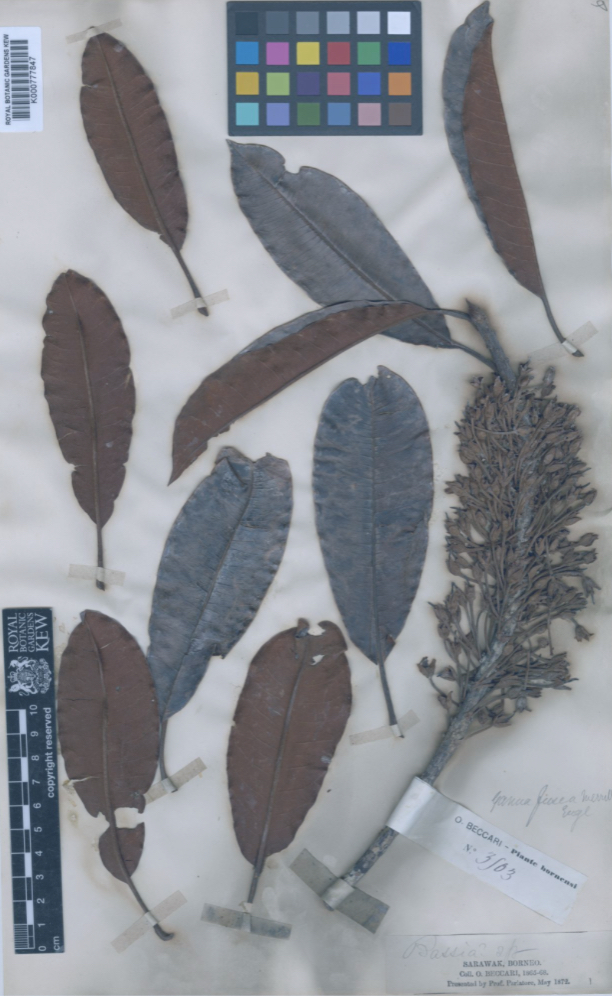

Conservation status
- Endangered (IUCN 3.1)

Scientific classification
- Kingdom: Plantae
- Clade: Embryophytes
- Clade: Tracheophytes
- Clade: Angiosperms
- Clade: Eudicots
- Clade: Asterids
- Order: Ericales
- Family: Sapotaceae
- Genus: Madhuca
- Species: M. fusca

Binomial name
- Madhuca fusca (Engl.) Forman

Synonyms
- Ganua fusca (Engl.) Merr.; Ganua rubiginosa Pierre ex Dubard; Illipe fusca Engl.; Vidoricum fuscum (Engl.) Kuntze

= Madhuca fusca =

Species of t

Madhuca fusca is a tree in the family Sapotaceae. The specific epithet fusca means 'very dark brown', referring to the indumentum.

== Distribution and habitat ==
Madhuca fusca is endemic to Borneo. Its habitat is kerangas forests to 300 metres (1,000 ft) altitude.

== Conservation ==
Madhuca fusca has been assessed as endangered on the IUCN Red List. The species is threatened by logging and conversion of land for palm oil plantations.
