= Madhuca brochidodroma =

Conservation status
- Endangered (IUCN 3.1)

Scientific classification
- Kingdom: Plantae
- Clade: Embryophytes
- Clade: Tracheophytes
- Clade: Angiosperms
- Clade: Eudicots
- Clade: Asterids
- Order: Ericales
- Family: Sapotaceae
- Genus: Madhuca
- Species: M. brochidodroma

Binomial name
- Madhuca brochidodroma T.D.Penn.

Synonyms
- Ganua coriacea Pierre ex Dubard

Species of flowering plant

Madhuca brochidodroma is a plant in the family Sapotaceae. The specific epithet brochidodroma means 'loop-veined', referring to the leaves.

== Description ==
Madhuca brochidodroma grows as a tree up to 25 metres (80 ft) tall, with a trunk diameter of up to 30 cm (12 in). The bark is reddish brown. Inflorescences bear up to six cream-coloured flowers.

== Distribution and habitat ==
Madhuca brochidodroma is native to Sumatra and Borneo. Its habitat is peat swamp forest.

== Conservation ==
Madhuca brochidodroma has been assessed as endangered on the IUCN Red List. The species is threatened by logging and conversion of land for palm oil plantations.
