= Madhuca palembanica =

Conservation status
- Vulnerable (IUCN 3.1)

Scientific classification
- Kingdom: Plantae
- Clade: Tracheophytes
- Clade: Angiosperms
- Clade: Eudicots
- Clade: Asterids
- Order: Ericales
- Family: Sapotaceae
- Genus: Madhuca
- Species: M. palembanica

Binomial name
- Madhuca palembanica (Miq.) Forman

Synonyms
- Nageia palembanica (Miq.) Kuntze; Podocarpus palembanicus Miq.; Ganua palembanica (Miq.) Assem & Kosterm.

Species of tree

Madhuca palembanica is a tree in the family Sapotaceae. It is named for Palembang in Sumatra.

== Description ==
Madhuca palembanica grows up to 30 metres (100 ft) tall, with a trunk diameter of up to 45 cm (20 in). The bark is greyish brown.

== Distribution and habitat ==
Madhuca palembanica is native to Sumatra and Borneo. Its habitat is mixed dipterocarp forest from 50–800 m (200–2,600 ft) altitude.

== Conservation ==
Madhuca palembanica has been assessed as vulnerable on the IUCN Red List. The species is threatened by logging and conversion of land for palm oil plantations.
