= Madhuca motleyana =

Conservation status
- Near Threatened (IUCN 3.1)

Scientific classification
- Kingdom: Plantae
- Clade: Tracheophytes
- Clade: Angiosperms
- Clade: Eudicots
- Clade: Asterids
- Order: Ericales
- Family: Sapotaceae
- Genus: Madhuca
- Species: M. motleyana

Binomial name
- Madhuca motleyana (de Vriese) J.F.Macbr.

Synonyms
- Bassia motleyana (de Vriese) Hook.f.; Ganua motleyana (de Vriese) Pierre ex Dubard; Ganua scortechinii (King & Gamble) H.J.Lam; Illipe motleyana (de Vriese) Engl.; Isonandra motleyana de Vriese; Payena bankensis Burck; Payena latifolia Burck; Payena longipetiolata Kurz; Payena rubropedicellata Burck; Sideroxylon glabrescens Miq.; Vidoricum motleyanum (de Vriese) Kuntze

Species of tree

Madhuca motleyana is a tree in the family Sapotaceae. It is named for engineer and naturalist James Motley, who lived and worked in Borneo in the 1850s.

== Description ==
Madhuca motleyana grows up to 28 metres (90 ft) tall, with a trunk diameter of up to 50 cm (20 in). The bark is greyish brown. Inflorescences bear up to 12 flowers. The fruits are ellipsoid, up to 2.5 cm (1 in) long and ripen yellow then reddish. Madhuca motleyana produces nyatoh timber, suitable for furniture making.

== Distribution and habitat ==
Madhuca motleyana is native to Thailand, Sumatra, Peninsular Malaysia and Borneo. Its habitat is swamps and forests from sea level to 1,460 m (5,000 ft) altitude.
