= Madhuca sandakanensis =

Conservation status
- Vulnerable (IUCN 3.1)

Scientific classification
- Kingdom: Plantae
- Clade: Embryophytes
- Clade: Tracheophytes
- Clade: Angiosperms
- Clade: Eudicots
- Clade: Asterids
- Order: Ericales
- Family: Sapotaceae
- Genus: Madhuca
- Species: M. sandakanensis

Binomial name
- Madhuca sandakanensis P.Royen

Species of tree

Madhuca sandakanensis is a tree in the family Sapotaceae. It is named for Sandakan in Borneo.

== Description ==
Madhuca sandakanensis grows up to 17 metres (60 ft) tall, with a trunk diameter of up to 20 cm (8 in). The twigs are pale yellowish green. Inflorescences bear up to five flowers.

== Distribution and habitat ==
Madhuca sandakanensis is endemic to Borneo. Its habitat is mixed dipterocarp forest from 30–550 m (100–1,800 ft) altitude.

== Conservation ==
Madhuca sandakanensis has been assessed as vulnerable on the IUCN Red List. The species is threatened by logging and conversion of land for palm oil plantations.
