= Madhuca silamensis =

Conservation status
- Endangered (IUCN 3.1)

Scientific classification
- Kingdom: Plantae
- Clade: Embryophytes
- Clade: Tracheophytes
- Clade: Angiosperms
- Clade: Eudicots
- Clade: Asterids
- Order: Ericales
- Family: Sapotaceae
- Genus: Madhuca
- Species: M. silamensis

Binomial name
- Madhuca silamensis Yii & P.Chai

Species of tree

Madhuca silamensis is a tree in the family Sapotaceae. It is named for Mount Silam in Borneo.

== Description ==
Madhuca silamensis grows up to 9 metres (30 ft) tall, with a trunk diameter of up to 15 cm (6 in). The bark is greyish brown. Inflorescences bear up to three flowers.

== Distribution and habitat ==
Madhuca silamensis is endemic to Borneo, where it is known from only two locations in Sabah. Its habitat is lowland forests growing on ultrabasic soils up to 850 m (2,800 ft) elevation.

== Conservation ==
Madhuca silamensis has been assessed as endangered on the IUCN Red List. The species is threatened by logging and conversion of land for palm oil plantations.
