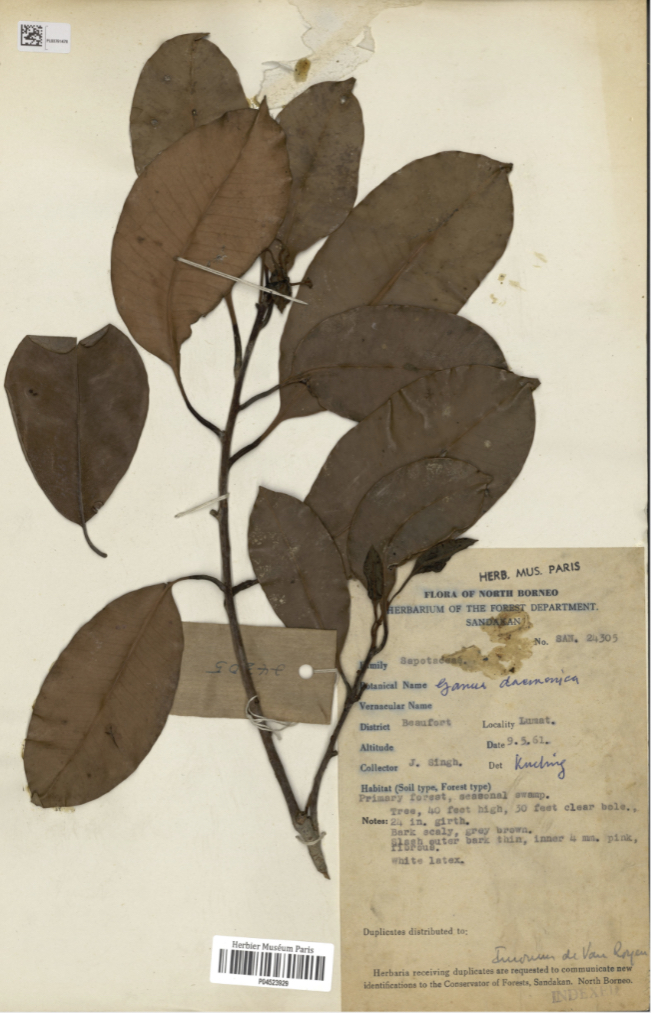

Conservation status
- Endangered (IUCN 3.1)

Scientific classification
- Kingdom: Plantae
- Clade: Embryophytes
- Clade: Tracheophytes
- Clade: Angiosperms
- Clade: Eudicots
- Clade: Asterids
- Order: Ericales
- Family: Sapotaceae
- Genus: Madhuca
- Species: M. daemonica

Binomial name
- Madhuca daemonica (Assem) Yii & P.Chai

Synonyms
- Ganua daemonica Assem

= Madhuca daemonica =

Species of tree

Madhuca daemonica is a tree in the family Sapotaceae.

== Description ==
Madhuca daemonica grows up to 24 metres (80 ft) tall, with a trunk diameter of up to 50 cm (20 in). The bark is reddish brown. Inflorescences bear up to seven translucent white flowers.

== Distribution and habitat ==
Madhuca daemonica is endemic to Borneo. Its habitat is peat swamp, mixed dipterocarp and kerangas forests to 700 m (2,000 ft) altitude.

== Conservation ==
Madhuca daemonica has been assessed as endangered on the IUCN Red List. The species is threatened by logging and conversion of land for palm oil plantations.
