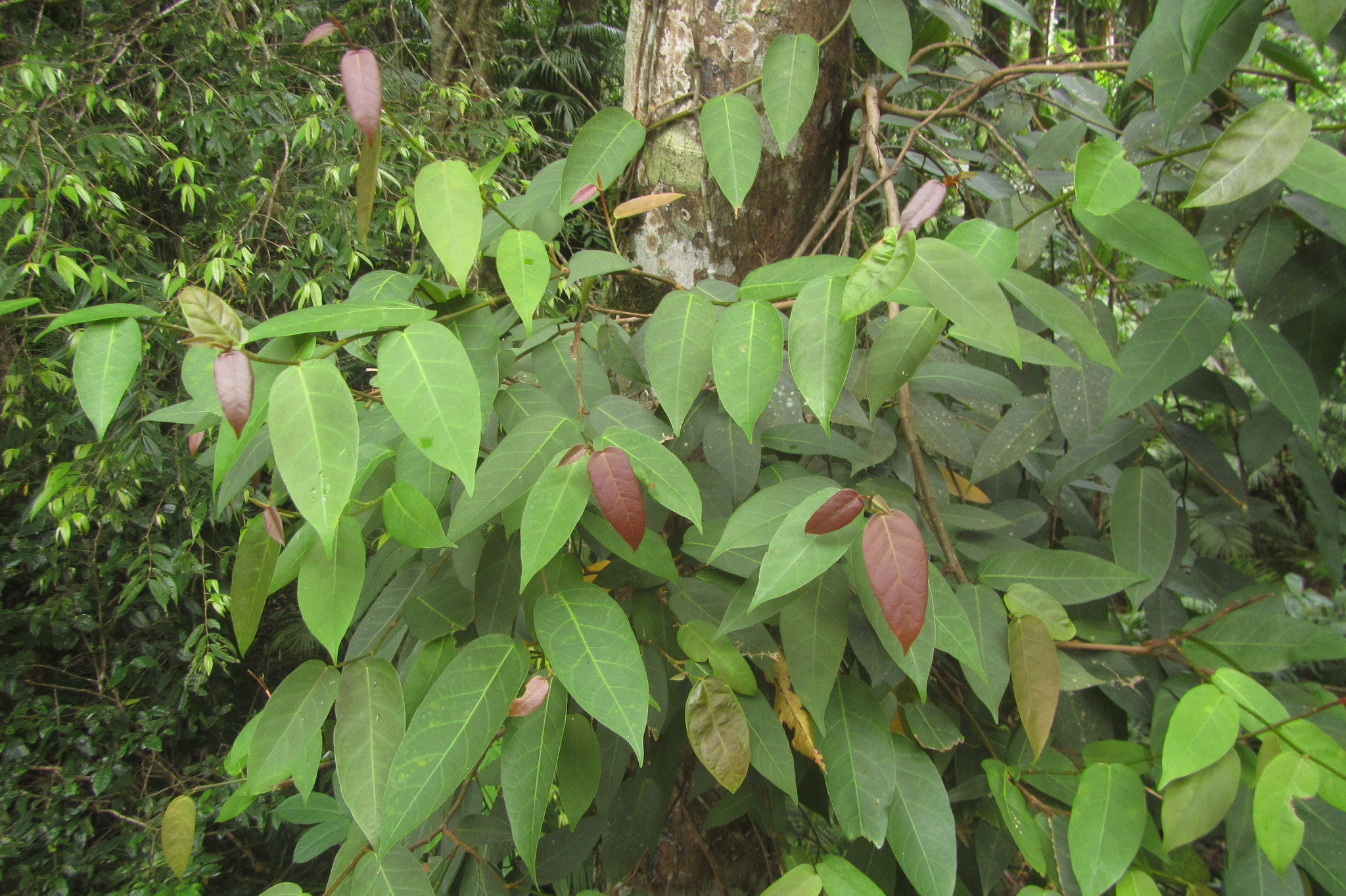

Conservation status
- Least Concern (NCA)

Scientific classification
- Kingdom: Plantae
- Clade: Embryophytes
- Clade: Tracheophytes
- Clade: Spermatophytes
- Clade: Angiosperms
- Clade: Eudicots
- Clade: Rosids
- Order: Rosales
- Family: Moraceae
- Genus: Ficus
- Subgenus: F. subg. Synoecia
- Species: F. pantoniana

Binomial name
- Ficus pantoniana King

Synonyms
- Ficus nugenti Domin; F. scandens var. australis F.M.Bailey

= Ficus pantoniana =

Species of plant

Ficus pantoniana, commonly known as the climbing fig, is a plant in the family Moraceae. It is native to the eastern part of Malesia, Papua New Guinea, and northeastern Queensland, Australia. It is a woody root climber which may reach 6 m (20 ft) in height. It was described by botanist George King in 1887 from a specimen collected in New Guinea. Ficus nugenti by Karel Domin in 1921, and F. scandens var. australis by Bailey are synonyms.
