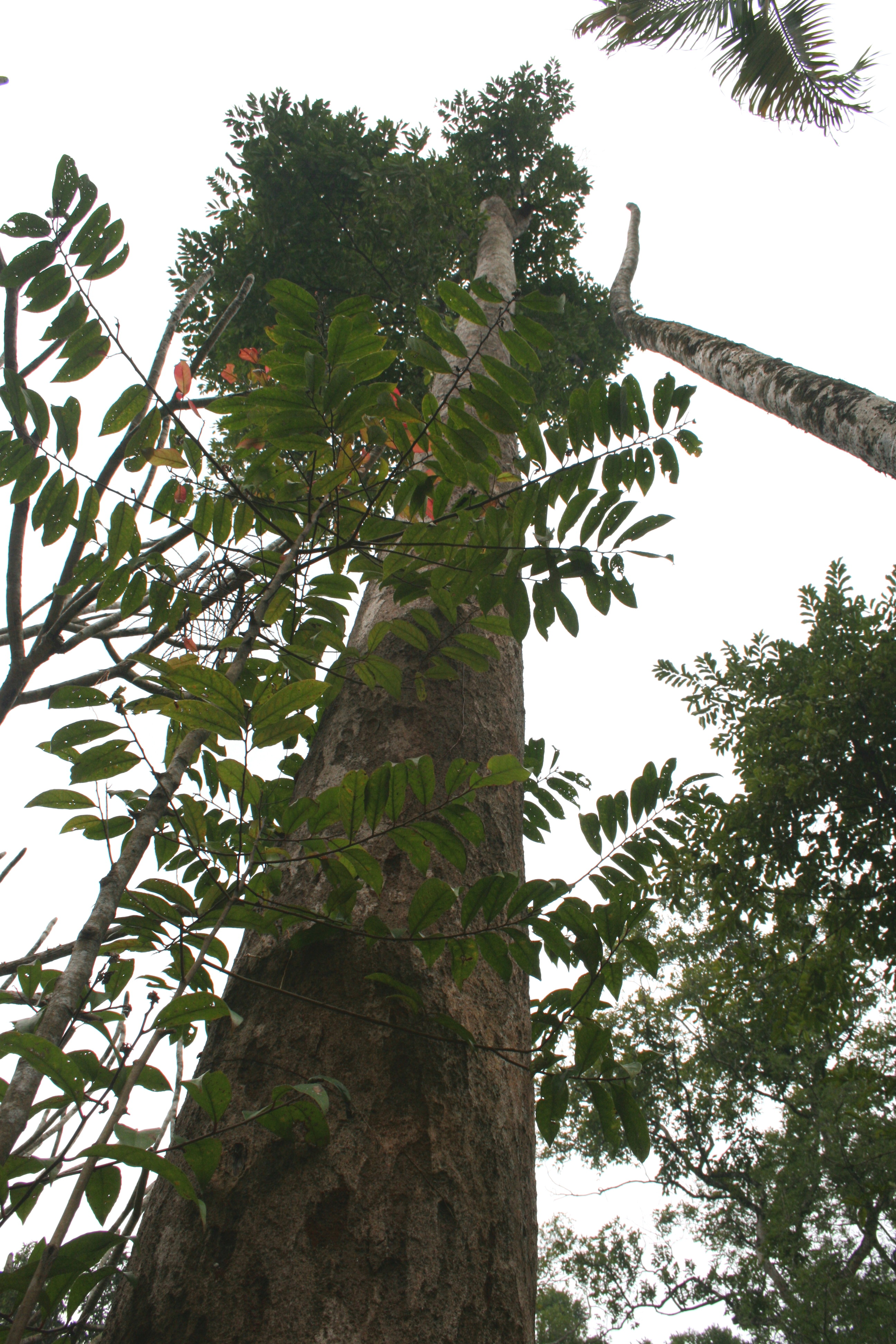

Conservation status
- Vulnerable (IUCN 2.3)

Scientific classification
- Kingdom: Plantae
- Clade: Tracheophytes
- Clade: Angiosperms
- Clade: Eudicots
- Clade: Asterids
- Order: Ericales
- Family: Sapotaceae
- Genus: Madhuca
- Species: M. pasquieri

Binomial name
- Madhuca pasquieri (Dubard) H.J.Lam

= Madhuca pasquieri =

Species of tree

Madhuca pasquieri is a species of plant in the family Sapotaceae. It is found in China and Vietnam. It is threatened by habitat loss and overharvesting for its timber.
