= Madhuca fulva =

Conservation status
- Vulnerable (IUCN 2.3)

Scientific classification
- Kingdom: Plantae
- Clade: Tracheophytes
- Clade: Angiosperms
- Clade: Eudicots
- Clade: Asterids
- Order: Ericales
- Family: Sapotaceae
- Genus: Madhuca
- Species: M. fulva

Binomial name
- Madhuca fulva (Thwaites) J.F.Macbr.

Species of flowering plant

Madhuca fulva is a species of plant in the family Sapotaceae. It is endemic to Sri Lanka. It is known as "වන මල් - wana mal" by Sinhalese people.
