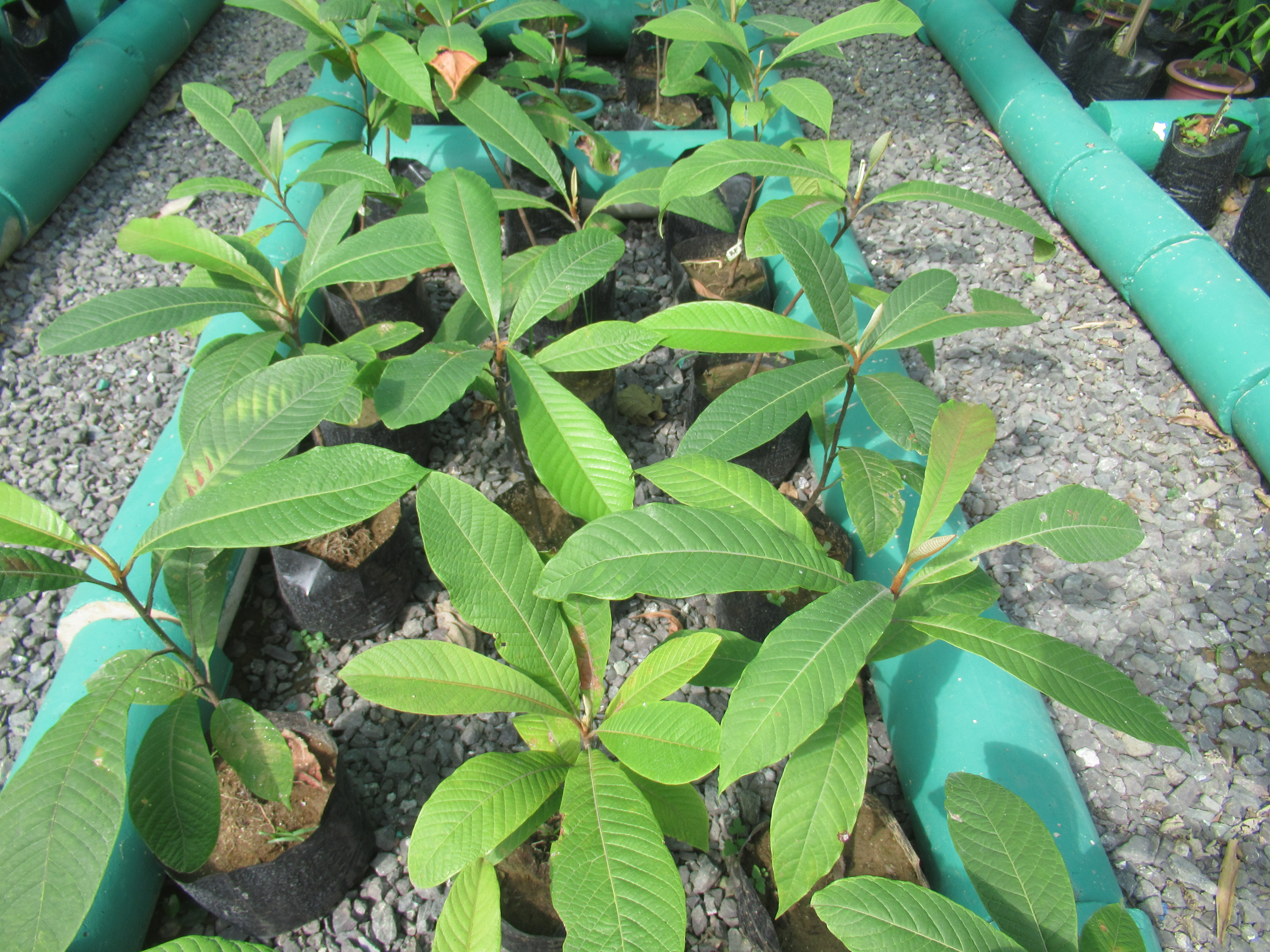

Conservation status
- Vulnerable (IUCN 2.3)

Scientific classification
- Kingdom: Plantae
- Clade: Embryophytes
- Clade: Tracheophytes
- Clade: Angiosperms
- Clade: Eudicots
- Clade: Asterids
- Order: Ericales
- Family: Sapotaceae
- Genus: Madhuca
- Species: M. betis

Binomial name
- Madhuca betis (Blanco) J.F.Macbr.

Synonyms
- Azaola betis Blanco; Bassia betis (Blanco) Merr. Illipe betis (Blanco) Merr. Isonandra betis (Blanco) Baehni; Madhuca philippinensis Merr. Payena betis (Blanco) Fern.-Vill.

= Madhuca betis =

Species of flowering plant

Madhuca betis is a species of flowering plant in the family Sapotaceae. It is found in Indonesia and the Philippines. It is threatened by habitat loss.
