= Madhuca hainanensis =

Conservation status
- Vulnerable (IUCN 2.3)

Scientific classification
- Kingdom: Plantae
- Clade: Tracheophytes
- Clade: Angiosperms
- Clade: Eudicots
- Clade: Asterids
- Order: Ericales
- Family: Sapotaceae
- Genus: Madhuca
- Species: M. hainanensis

Binomial name
- Madhuca hainanensis Chun & F.C.How

Species of flowering plant

Madhuca hainanensis is a species of plant in the family Sapotaceae. It is endemic to China. It is threatened by habitat loss.
