= Madhuca prolixa =

Conservation status
- Near Threatened (IUCN 3.1)

Scientific classification
- Kingdom: Plantae
- Clade: Embryophytes
- Clade: Tracheophytes
- Clade: Angiosperms
- Clade: Eudicots
- Clade: Asterids
- Order: Ericales
- Family: Sapotaceae
- Genus: Madhuca
- Species: M. prolixa

Binomial name
- Madhuca prolixa (Pierre ex Dubard) Yii & P.Chai

Synonyms
- Ganua prolixa Pierre ex Dubard

Species of tree

Madhuca prolixa is a tree in the family Sapotaceae. The specific epithet prolixa means 'expanded', referring to the inflorescences.

== Description ==
Madhuca prolixa grows up to 10 metres (30 ft) tall, with a trunk diameter of up to 15 cm (6 in). The bark is greyish brown. Inflorescences bear up to eight flowers. The fruits are yellowish-grey, subglobose, up to 2 cm (1 in) in diameter.

== Distribution and habitat ==
Madhuca prolixa is endemic to Borneo. Its habitat is lowland mixed dipterocarp forest from 120–1,640 m (400–5,400 ft) altitude.

== Conservation ==
Madhuca prolixa has been assessed as near threatened on the IUCN Red List. The species is threatened by logging and conversion of land for palm oil plantations.
