= Madhuca sepilokensis =

Conservation status
- Endangered (IUCN 3.1)

Scientific classification
- Kingdom: Plantae
- Clade: Embryophytes
- Clade: Tracheophytes
- Clade: Angiosperms
- Clade: Eudicots
- Clade: Asterids
- Order: Ericales
- Family: Sapotaceae
- Genus: Madhuca
- Species: M. sepilokensis

Binomial name
- Madhuca sepilokensis P.Royen

Species of tree

Madhuca sepilokensis is a tree in the family Sapotaceae. It is named for Sepilok in Malaysia's Sabah state.

== Description ==
Madhuca sepilokensis grows up to 13 metres (40 ft) tall, with a trunk diameter of up to 15 cm (6 in). Inflorescences bear up to six flowers.

== Distribution and habitat ==
Madhuca sepilokensis is endemic to Borneo. Its habitat is lowland mixed dipterocarp forest to 100 m (300 ft) altitude.

== Conservation ==
Madhuca sepilokensis has been assessed as endangered on the IUCN Red List. The species is threatened by logging and conversion of land for palm oil plantations.
