= Madhuca borneensis =

Conservation status
- Near Threatened (IUCN 3.1)

Scientific classification
- Kingdom: Plantae
- Clade: Embryophytes
- Clade: Tracheophytes
- Clade: Angiosperms
- Clade: Eudicots
- Clade: Asterids
- Order: Ericales
- Family: Sapotaceae
- Genus: Madhuca
- Species: M. borneensis

Binomial name
- Madhuca borneensis P.Royen

Synonyms
- Madhuca eriobrachyon P.Royen

Species of flowering plant

Madhuca borneensis is a plant in the family Sapotaceae.

== Description ==
Madhuca borneensis grows as a tree up to 30 metres (100 ft) tall, with a trunk diameter of up to 50 cm (20 in). The bark is greyish. Inflorescences bear up to seven white flowers. The fruit is reddish-brown, ovoid to ellipsoid, up to 3 cm (1 in) long.

== Distribution and habitat ==
Madhuca borneensis is endemic to Borneo. Its habitat is lowland mixed dipterocarp forest to 200 m (700 ft) altitude.

== Conservation ==
Madhuca borneensis has been assessed as near threatened on the IUCN Red List. The species is threatened by logging and land conversion for palm oil plantations.
