= Madhuca mindanaensis =

Conservation status
- Least Concern (IUCN 3.1)

Scientific classification
- Kingdom: Plantae
- Clade: Tracheophytes
- Clade: Angiosperms
- Clade: Eudicots
- Clade: Asterids
- Order: Ericales
- Family: Sapotaceae
- Genus: Madhuca
- Species: M. mindanaensis

Binomial name
- Madhuca mindanaensis (Merr.) Merr.

Synonyms
- Bassia mindanaensis Merr.

Species of tree

Madhuca mindanaensis is a tree in the family Sapotaceae. It is named after Mindanao in the Philippines.

== Description ==
Madhuca mindanaensis grows up to 20 metres (70 ft) tall, with a trunk diameter of up to 25 cm (10 in). The bark is greyish brown. Inflorescences bear up to nine flowers.

== Distribution and habitat ==
Madhuca mindanaensis is native to Borneo and the Philippines. Its habitat is mixed dipterocarp forests to 1,500 m (5,000 ft) altitude.
