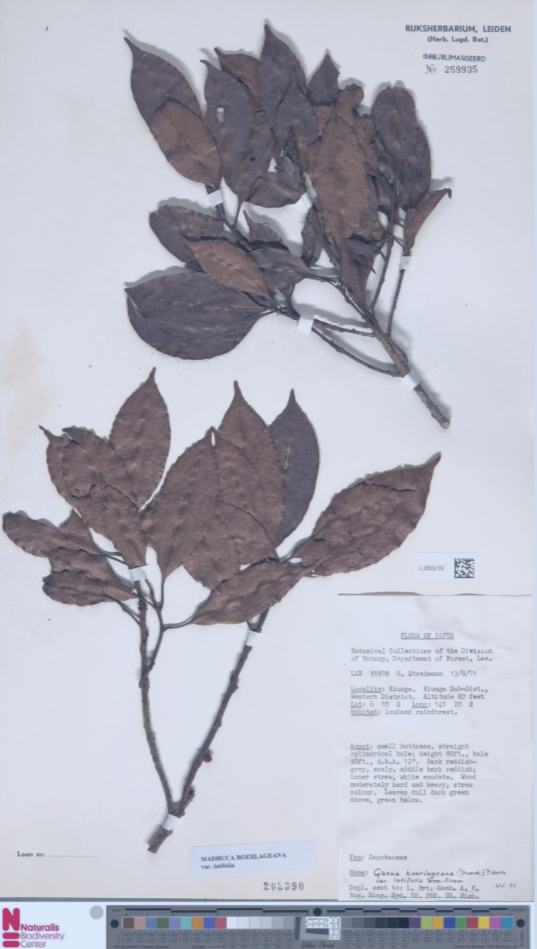

Conservation status
- Vulnerable (IUCN 3.1)

Scientific classification
- Kingdom: Plantae
- Clade: Tracheophytes
- Clade: Angiosperms
- Clade: Eudicots
- Clade: Asterids
- Order: Ericales
- Family: Sapotaceae
- Genus: Madhuca
- Species: M. boerlageana

Binomial name
- Madhuca boerlageana (Burck) Baehni

= Madhuca boerlageana =

Species of flowering plant

Madhuca boerlageana is a species of plant in the family Sapotaceae. It is found in the Maluku Islands of Indonesia and on New Guinea, which is politically divided between Indonesia and Papua New Guinea. It is a tree native to lowland tropical rain forest. It is threatened by habitat loss.
