= Madhuca sericea =

Conservation status
- Vulnerable (IUCN 3.1)

Scientific classification
- Kingdom: Plantae
- Clade: Embryophytes
- Clade: Tracheophytes
- Clade: Angiosperms
- Clade: Eudicots
- Clade: Asterids
- Order: Ericales
- Family: Sapotaceae
- Genus: Madhuca
- Species: M. sericea

Binomial name
- Madhuca sericea (Miq.) S.Moore

Synonyms
- Bassia sericea (Miq.) King ex S.Moore; Kakosmanthus argenteus (de Vriese ex C.B.Clarke) Pierre ex Dubard

Species of tree

Madhuca sericea is a tree in the family Sapotaceae. The specific epithet sericea means 'silky', referring to the indumentum.

== Description ==
Madhuca sericea grows up to 33 metres (110 ft) tall, with a trunk diameter of up to 60 cm (24 in). The bark is greyish brown. Inflorescences bear up to seven flowers. The fruits are ellipsoid, up to 3.5 cm (1 in) long and greyish when young.

== Distribution and habitat ==
Madhuca sericea is native to Sumatra, Peninsular Malaysia, Singapore and Borneo. Its habitat is mixed dipterocarp forest to 1,210 m (4,000 ft) altitude.

== Conservation ==
Madhuca sericea has been assessed as vulnerable on the IUCN Red List. The species is threatened by logging and conversion of land for palm oil plantations.
