= Madhuca kuchingensis =

Conservation status
- Vulnerable (IUCN 3.1)

Scientific classification
- Kingdom: Plantae
- Clade: Embryophytes
- Clade: Tracheophytes
- Clade: Angiosperms
- Clade: Eudicots
- Clade: Asterids
- Order: Ericales
- Family: Sapotaceae
- Genus: Madhuca
- Species: M. kuchingensis

Binomial name
- Madhuca kuchingensis Yii & P.Chai

Synonyms
- Ganua beccarii Pierre ex Dubard

Species of tree

Madhuca kuchingensis is a tree in the family Sapotaceae. It is named for the city of Kuching in Borneo.

== Description ==
Madhuca kuchingensis grows up to 20 metres (70 ft) tall, with a trunk diameter of up to 30 centimetres (12 in). The bark is greyish brown. Inflorescences bear up to eight flowers. The fruits are yellowish, ellipsoid, up to 2 cm (1 in) long.

== Distribution and habitat ==
Madhuca kuchingensis is endemic to Borneo. Its habitat is lowland mixed dipterocarp and kerangas forests from 90–1,350 m (300–4,400 ft) altitude.

== Conservation ==
Madhuca kuchingensis has been assessed as vulnerable on the IUCN Red List. The species is threatened by logging and conversion of land to palm oil plantations.
