= Madhuca pubicalyx =

Conservation status
- Near Threatened (IUCN 3.1)

Scientific classification
- Kingdom: Plantae
- Clade: Embryophytes
- Clade: Tracheophytes
- Clade: Angiosperms
- Clade: Eudicots
- Clade: Asterids
- Order: Ericales
- Family: Sapotaceae
- Genus: Madhuca
- Species: M. pubicalyx

Binomial name
- Madhuca pubicalyx Ridl.

Species of tree

Madhuca pubicalyx is a tree in the family Sapotaceae. The specific epithet pubicalyx means 'soft-haired calyx'.

== Description ==
Madhuca pubicalyx grows up to 25 metres (80 ft) tall, with a trunk diameter of up to 30 cm (12 in). The bark is greyish brown. Inflorescences bear up to eight flowers. The fruits are ellipsoid, up to 2.6 cm (1 in) long.

== Distribution and habitat ==
Madhuca pubicalyx is endemic to Borneo. Its habitat is mixed dipterocarp forest to 1,371 m (4,500 ft) altitude.

== Conservation ==
Madhuca pubicalyx has been assessed as near threatened on the IUCN Red List. The species is threatened by logging and conversion of land for palm oil plantations.
