= Mount Silam =

Mountain in Malaysia

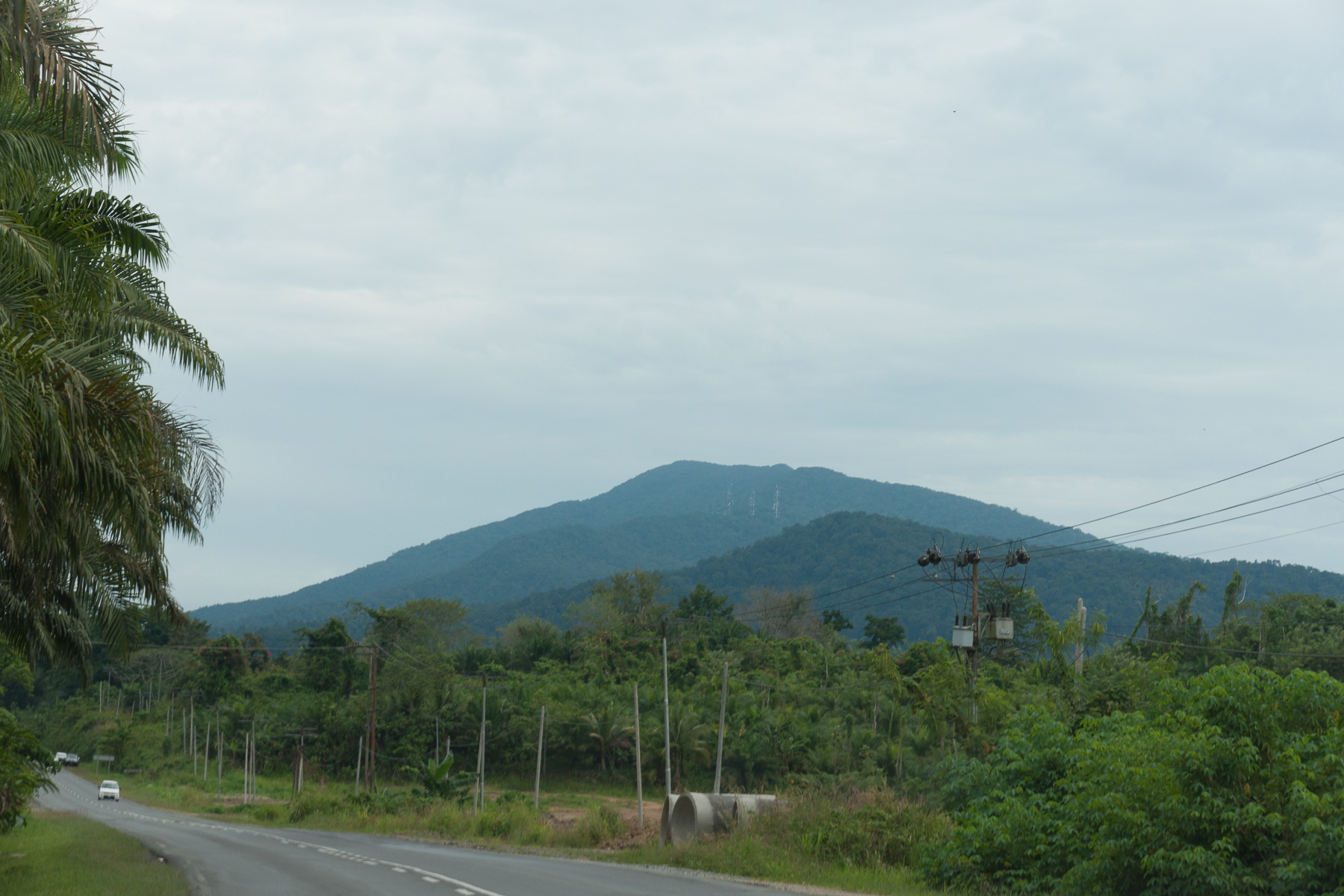

Highest point
- Elevation: 884 m (2,900 ft)
- Prominence: 656 m (2,152 ft)
- Coordinates: 4.957°N 118.165°E

Naming
- Native name: Gunung Silam (Malay)

Geography
- Location within Malaysia
- Location: Lahad Datu District, Sabah, Malaysia

Mount Silam (Malay: Gunung Silam) is a mountain in Lahad Datu District, Sabah, Malaysia.

== Description ==
Mount Silam is 884 metres (2,900 ft) high and overlooks Darvel Bay on the Celebes Sea. The geology is characterised by ultrabasic rock. Rainforest covers the mountain from 200 m (700 ft) altitude to the summit.

== Flora ==
Mount Silam is home to the endangered tree species Madhuca silamensis and Semecarpus lineatus. It is also home to a number of pitcher plant species including Nepenthes macrovulgaris and Nepenthes tentaculata.

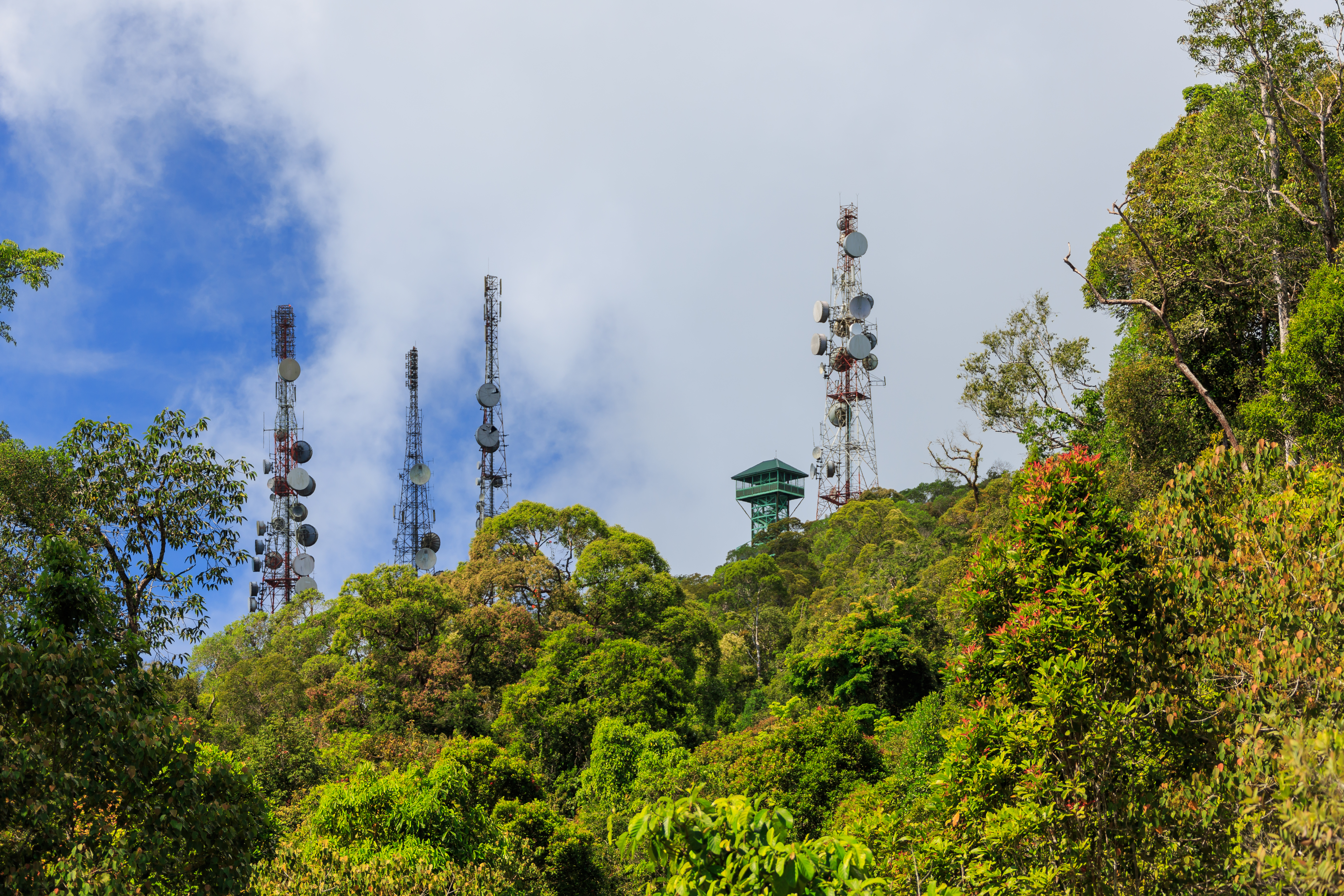
Radio masts on mountain

== Tourism ==
The Tower of Heaven (Menara Kayangan) is a 30-metre-high (98 ft) observation tower that was built as a tourist facility at the top of Mount Silam in 2012. The tower has panoramic views that include the Darvel Bay islands. The complex includes nature trails and tourist accommodation.
