= Madhuca microphylla =

Conservation status
- Endangered (IUCN 2.3)

Scientific classification
- Kingdom: Plantae
- Clade: Tracheophytes
- Clade: Angiosperms
- Clade: Eudicots
- Clade: Asterids
- Order: Ericales
- Family: Sapotaceae
- Genus: Madhuca
- Species: M. microphylla

Binomial name
- Madhuca microphylla (Hook.) Alston

Species of flowering plant

Madhuca microphylla is a species of flowering plant in the family Sapotaceae. It is endemic to Sri Lanka, where it has been found in only two locations.
