= Madhuca ochracea =

Conservation status
- Vulnerable (IUCN 3.1)

Scientific classification
- Kingdom: Plantae
- Clade: Embryophytes
- Clade: Tracheophytes
- Clade: Angiosperms
- Clade: Eudicots
- Clade: Asterids
- Order: Ericales
- Family: Sapotaceae
- Genus: Madhuca
- Species: M. ochracea

Binomial name
- Madhuca ochracea Yii & P.Chai

Species of tree

Madhuca ochracea is a tree in the family Sapotaceae. The specific epithet ochracea means 'yellowish brown', referring to the indumentum.

== Description ==
Madhuca ochracea grows up to 25 metres (80 ft) tall, with a trunk diameter of up to 70 cm (30 in). The bark is greyish brown. Inflorescences bear up to seven flowers.

== Distribution and habitat ==
Madhuca ochracea is endemic to Borneo, where it is known only from Sarawak. Its habitat is lowland mixed dipterocarp forest from sea level to 100 m (300 ft) altitude.

== Conservation ==
Madhuca ochracea has been assessed as vulnerable on the IUCN Red List. The species is threatened by logging and conversion of land for palm oil plantations. One collection (of two) of the species is in Niah National Park, where the habitat is considered intact.
