= Quercus nivea =

Conservation status
- Endangered (IUCN 3.1)

Scientific classification
- Kingdom: Plantae
- Clade: Embryophytes
- Clade: Tracheophytes
- Clade: Spermatophytes
- Clade: Angiosperms
- Clade: Eudicots
- Clade: Rosids
- Order: Fagales
- Family: Fagaceae
- Genus: Quercus
- Subgenus: Quercus subg. Cerris
- Section: Quercus sect. Cyclobalanopsis
- Species: Q. nivea

Binomial name
- Quercus nivea King

Species of flowering plant

Quercus nivea is a species of oak. It is a tree native to Peninsular Malaysia and to Sarawak on northern Borneo. It grows in widely scattered populations in tropical moist forests from 305 to 1,000 metres elevation.

The species was described by George King in 1889.
