= Madhuca moonii =

Conservation status
- Vulnerable (IUCN 2.3)

Scientific classification
- Kingdom: Plantae
- Clade: Tracheophytes
- Clade: Angiosperms
- Clade: Eudicots
- Clade: Asterids
- Order: Ericales
- Family: Sapotaceae
- Genus: Madhuca
- Species: M. moonii

Binomial name
- Madhuca moonii (Thwaites) H.J.Lam

Species of flowering plant

Madhuca moonii is a species of plant in the family Sapotaceae. It is endemic to Sri Lanka.
