= Madhuca vulpina =

Conservation status
- Critically Endangered (IUCN 3.1)

Scientific classification
- Kingdom: Plantae
- Clade: Embryophytes
- Clade: Tracheophytes
- Clade: Angiosperms
- Clade: Eudicots
- Clade: Asterids
- Order: Ericales
- Family: Sapotaceae
- Genus: Madhuca
- Species: M. vulpina

Binomial name
- Madhuca vulpina Vink

Species of tree

Madhuca vulpina is a tree in the family Sapotaceae. The specific epithet vulpina means 'fox-like', referring to the colour of the indumentum.

== Description ==
Madhuca vulpina grows up to 30 metres (100 ft) tall, with a trunk diameter of up to 45 cm (20 in). The bark is brown. Inflorescences bear up to three flowers.

== Distribution and habitat ==
Madhuca vulpina is endemic to Borneo, where it is confined to Sarawak. Its habitat is mixed dipterocarp and kerangas forests to 120 m (400 ft) altitude.

== Conservation ==
Madhuca vulpina has been assessed as critically endangered on the IUCN Red List. The species is threatened by logging and conversion of land for palm oil plantations.
