= Madhuca markleeana =

Conservation status
- Critically Endangered (IUCN 3.1)

Scientific classification
- Kingdom: Plantae
- Clade: Embryophytes
- Clade: Tracheophytes
- Clade: Angiosperms
- Clade: Eudicots
- Clade: Asterids
- Order: Ericales
- Family: Sapotaceae
- Genus: Madhuca
- Species: M. markleeana

Binomial name
- Madhuca markleeana Yii & P.Chai

Species of flowering plant

Madhuca markleeana is a tree in the family Sapotaceae.

== Description ==
Madhuca markleeana grows up to 15 metres (50 ft) tall, with a trunk diameter of up to 25 cm (10 in). The bark is chocolate brown. Inflorescences bear up to five white flowers. The fruits are green, ellipsoid, up to 7 cm (3 in) long.

== Distribution and habitat ==
Madhuca markleeana is endemic to Borneo, where it is confined to Sarawak. Its habitat is lowland mixed dipterocarp forest to 400 m (1,300 ft) altitude.

== Conservation ==
Madhuca markleeana has been assessed as critically endangered on the IUCN Red List. The species is known from only two collections in Sarawak's Simunjan District, where most forest has been logged and converted to palm oil plantations.
