= Madhuca primoplagensis =

Conservation status
- Endangered (IUCN 3.1)

Scientific classification
- Kingdom: Plantae
- Clade: Embryophytes
- Clade: Tracheophytes
- Clade: Angiosperms
- Clade: Eudicots
- Clade: Asterids
- Order: Ericales
- Family: Sapotaceae
- Genus: Madhuca
- Species: M. primoplagensis

Binomial name
- Madhuca primoplagensis Vink

Species of tree

Madhuca primoplagensis is a tree in the family Sapotaceae. The specific epithet primoplagensis means 'first region', referring to Sarawak's First or Kuching Division, the tree's native habitat.

== Description ==
Madhuca primoplagensis grows up to 20 metres (70 ft) tall, with a trunk diameter of up to 35 cm (14 in). The bark is dark brown. Inflorescences bear up to 13 flowers. The fruits are ellipsoid, up to 3 cm (1 in) long.

== Distribution and habitat ==
Madhuca primoplagensis is endemic to Borneo, where it is known only from Sarawak. Its habitat is lowland forests from 90–300 m (300–1,000 ft) altitude.

== Conservation ==
Madhuca primoplagensis has been assessed as endangered on the IUCN Red List. The species is threatened by logging conversion of land to palm oil plantations.
