= Madhuca obovatifolia =

Conservation status
- Endangered (IUCN 3.1)

Scientific classification
- Kingdom: Plantae
- Clade: Tracheophytes
- Clade: Angiosperms
- Clade: Eudicots
- Clade: Asterids
- Order: Ericales
- Family: Sapotaceae
- Genus: Madhuca
- Species: M. obovatifolia

Binomial name
- Madhuca obovatifolia (Merr.) Merr.

Species of flowering plant

Madhuca obovatifolia is a species of plant in the family Sapotaceae. It is endemic to the Philippines, where it is confined to Luzon. It is threatened by habitat loss.
