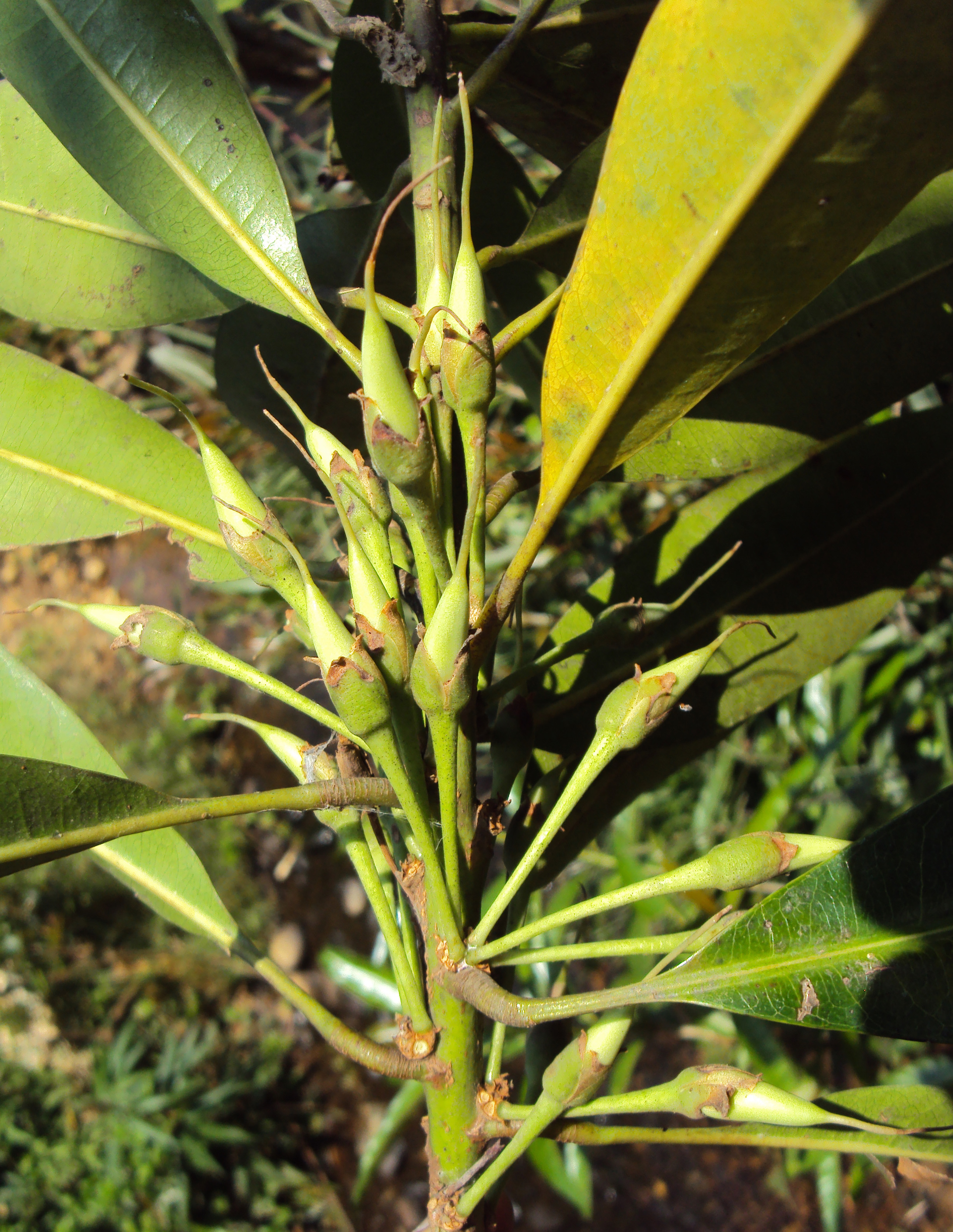

Conservation status
- Least Concern (IUCN 3.1)

Scientific classification
- Kingdom: Plantae
- Clade: Tracheophytes
- Clade: Angiosperms
- Clade: Eudicots
- Clade: Asterids
- Order: Ericales
- Family: Sapotaceae
- Genus: Madhuca
- Species: M. neriifolia

Binomial name
- Madhuca neriifolia (Moon) H.J.Lam

= Madhuca neriifolia =

Species of flowering plant

Madhuca neriifolia is a species of plant in the family Sapotaceae. It is native to Sri Lanka and India's Western Ghats.
