= James Sykes Gamble =

English botanist (1847-1925)

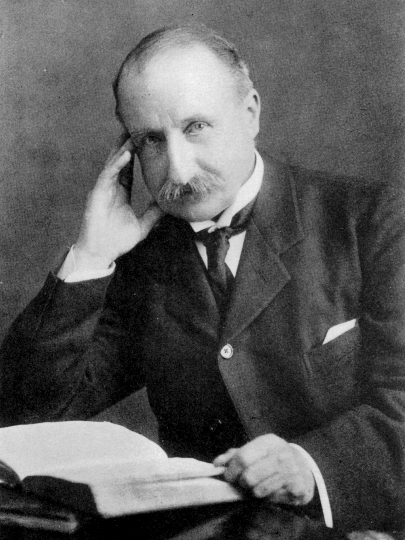
- Born: 2 July 1847; London
- Died: 16 October 1925 (aged 78); Haslemere, West Sussex
- Known for: The book A Manual of Indian Timbers
- Awards: Fellow of the Royal Society
- Scientific career
- Fields: Botany

James Sykes Gamble CIE FRS FLS (2 July 1847 – 16 October 1925) was an English botanist who specialized in the flora of the Indian sub-continent; he became Director of the British Imperial Forest School at Dehradun, and a Fellow of the Royal Society.

== Early life and education ==
Gamble was born at Portland Place, London, the second son of Harpur Gamble, M.D., R.N. and Isabella. He completed his formal education at the Royal Naval School, New Cross, before going up to Oxford, where he attended Magdalen College, studying mathematics, gaining a First in the Final Schools in 1868. In the same year, he sat for the Indian Civil Service examinations, and gained an appointment in the Indian Forest Department the following year. Gamble later studied at the École nationale des eaux et forêts, Nancy (1869-1871) where he gained an interest in taxonomy.

== Career ==
Gamble sailed for India in 1871 to join the Imperial Forest Department, and ultimately became Director of the Imperial Forest School at Dehradun. His first posting was in Burma but after a year he moved to Bengal where he worked in the Darjeeling forests. Here he produced the first list of the trees and shrubs of Darjeeling. From 1872 to 1877 he worked mostly in the Darjeeling and Jalpaiguri area with short visits to Allahabad and Shimla. In 1877 he moved to the capital in Shimla where he worked on the local flora. In 1879 he moved back to Calcutta and travelled around the Sunderbans, Chota Nagpore, Santal Parganas and Orissa regions. He worked, along with his colleague Sulpiz Kurz, at the Calcutta Herbarium. In 1890, Gamble founded the Forest School Herbarium (renamed the Dehradun Herbarium in 1908). In 1882 he was made Conservator in the Madras Presidency and here he worked in collaboration with W. A. Talbot of the Bombay Presidency. During this time he took an interest in the cultivation of Eucalyptus globulus in the Nilgiris. In 1890 he moved to the North-West Provinces and became Director of the Forest School in Dehra Dun. He stayed in this post until his retirement in 1899. At Dehra Dun he developed his collections, adding from the Himalayan regions and also receiving specimens from J.F. Duthie and C.G. Rogers. This collection was described by Sir George King in 1899 as "probably the largest collection of plants ever owned in India." After his retirement Gamble also collected at the Cape of Good Hope in 1890 and from Switzerland, Italy, Sardinia, Malta, Gibraltar and South Norway. He was appointed CIE in the 1899 Birthday Honours

After retirement he continued to work on forestry, helping found the Forestry School at Oxford. His collection of nearly 50,000 specimens were gifted to Kew.

Author of several books, his best known was A Manual of Indian Timbers. He was also the author of many papers on forestry and botanical subjects in the Indian Forester, of which he was a founding editor. Another major work was the Flora of the Presidency of Madras (1915) of which five parts were published during his lifetime and he was working on the seventh at the time of his death. This required obtaining specimens from the botanical gardens at Calcutta, the forest herbarium at Travancore, the Agricultural College at Coimbatore and the Royal Botanic Garden at Edinburgh. He also made use of the specimens in the Madras Herbarium at Kew presented by Sir Alfred Gibbs and Lady Bourne. The work was completed by C.E.C. Fischer..

== Other works ==
- List of the trees, shrubs and large climbers found in the Darjeeling District, Bengal, (1st ed. 1877; 1878; 2nd ed. 1896), Bengal.
- A Manual of Indian Timbers: An Account of the Growth, Distribution and Uses of the Trees and Shrubs of India and Ceylon with Description of Their Wood-Structure. (1881; 1902).
- The Bambuseae of British India. Annals of the Royal Botanic Garden Calcutta, (1896), 133 pp.]
- Flora of the Presidency of Madras (1915–21, continued after his death by C.E.C. Fischer)
  - Volume 1 – Ranunculaceae to Caprifoliaceae.
  - Volume 2 – Rubiaceae to Euphorbiaceae.
  - Volume 3 – Ulmaceae to Gramineae. Addenda, indexes, etc.

== Personal life ==
Gamble retired to the UK in 1899, settling at Highfield, Liss, Hampshire, where he planted 72 acres with exotic trees, using many of the seeds he had collected. In 1911, he married Gertrude Latter.

Gamble died aged 78 on 16 October 1925 at the College Hospital, Haslemere, a few days after a surgery.

== Honours ==
In 1879, botanist C.B.Clarke published Gamblea, a genus of plants of the family Araliaceae, from Indo-China, and named in Gamble's honour.

In 1899, Gamble was elected a Fellow of the Royal Society, his candidature citation describing him as: 'Conservator of Forests, School Circle, NW Provinces, India, and Director of the Imperial Forest School, Dehra Dunn. Fellow of the University of Madras, and ex officio Fellow of the University of Allahabad...'

== Notes ==
NB: Gamble is listed erroneously as J. H. Gamble in some treatises.
