= Herman Johannes Lam =

Dutch botanist (1892–1977)

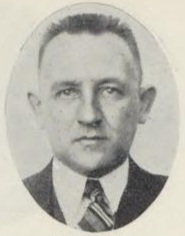
Lam

Herman Johannes Lam (3 January 1892 in Veendam – 15 February 1977 in Leiden) was a Dutch botanist.

Lam studied at Utrecht University, where he was awarded a Doctor of Biology in 1919. Lam was the appointed the director of the Rijksherbarium in 1933. He retired from academic work in 1962. He was member of the Royal Netherlands Academy of Arts and Sciences since 1960.

In 1957, botanist Steenis published a genus of plants from New Guinea (belonging to the family Bignoniaceae) as Lamiodendron, in his honour. The New Guinea species Myrmecodia lamii was also named after Lam.
