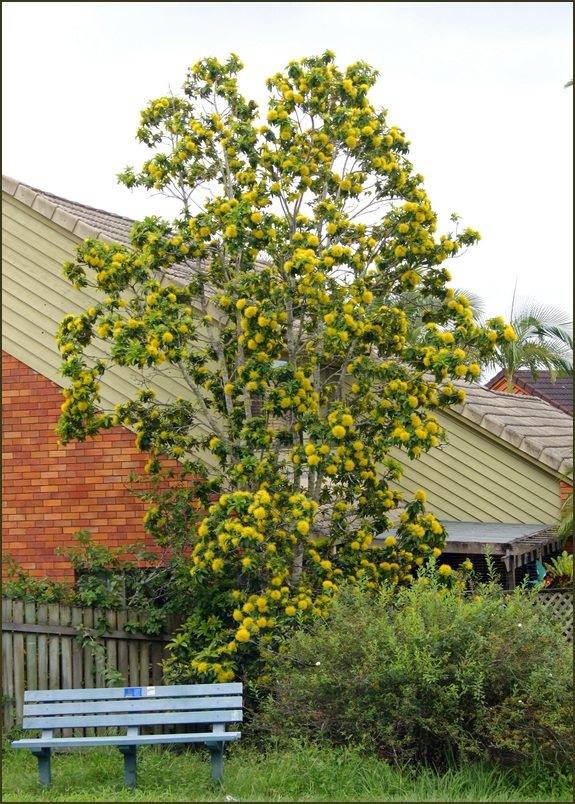
- Golden penda tree in Brisbane

Conservation status
- Least Concern (NCA)

Scientific classification
- Kingdom: Plantae
- Clade: Embryophytes
- Clade: Tracheophytes
- Clade: Spermatophytes
- Clade: Angiosperms
- Clade: Eudicots
- Clade: Rosids
- Order: Myrtales
- Family: Myrtaceae
- Genus: Xanthostemon
- Species: X. chrysanthus

Binomial name
- Xanthostemon chrysanthus (F.Muell.) Benth.

Synonyms
- Metrosideros chrysantha F.Muell.; Nania chrysantha (F.Muell.) Kuntze

= Xanthostemon chrysanthus =

Golden penda

Species of plant in the myrtle family

Xanthostemon chrysanthus, commonly known as golden penda, is a species of tree in the myrtle family Myrtaceae which is endemic to (found only in) north eastern Queensland, Australia. It is a popular garden plant with showy yellow blooms, and is the floral emblem of the city of Cairns.

== Description ==
Xanthostemon chrysanthus is as a tree growing up to 25 m (82 ft) high, and the rough-barked trunk may be buttressed. In its preferred habitat alongside rainforest creeks, the trunk will often be gnarled and twisted. It has a dense crown, with the dark glossy green leaves clustered towards the ends of the branches. The simple (i.e. without lobes or divisions) leaves are arranged alternately or in whorls. They are generally elliptic and measure up to 22 cm (8.7 in) long by 9.5 cm (3.7 in) wide.

The inflorescence is a terminal or axillary panicle which forms dense, showy heads of golden flowers. The calyx is green with 5 lobes and is about 1.5 cm (0.59 in) wide; petals are yellow or yellow-green and up to 9 mm (0.35 in) long. The most conspicuous aspect of the flower is the numerous stamens, which are bright yellow and up to 3 cm (1.2 in) long, making the overall diameter of the flower about 5 cm (2.0 in). Flowering can occur at any time of year, particularly after heavy rain events.

The fruit is a woody capsule about 1.5 cm (0.59 in) diameter, and contains between 2 and 4 small black seeds about 4 mm (0.16 in) long. The capsule splits open at maturity and releases the seeds.

== Taxonomy ==
This species was first described in 1864 by the Victorian Government botanist Ferdinand von Mueller as Metrosideros chrysantha, based on material collected by John Dallachy on 12 April 1864 from Rockingham Bay in northern Queensland. In 1891 the German botanist Otto Kuntze published a revision of the taxon, and gave it the new combination Nania chrysantha. Finally, it was reclassified in the genus Xanthostemon by George Bentham in the third volume of his Flora Australiensis in 1867.

=== Etymology ===
The specific epithet (chrysanthus) is derived from the ancient Greek words χρυσός (chrysós) "gold", and ἄνθος (ánthos) "flower".

== Distribution and habitat ==
The native range of the golden penda is from the Seaview Range near Ingham northwards to the area around the Pascoe River in Cape York Peninsula. It is most commonly found alongside creeks and rivers in rainforest, and at altitudes from sea level to 1,000 m (3,300 ft).

== Ecology ==
The profuse flowering attracts many nectar eating birds, including rainbow lorikeets (Trichoglossus moluccanus) and friarbirds (genus Philemon).

== Cultivation ==
Xanthostemon chrysanthus is cultivated as an ornamental plant for use in gardens and park landscaping but will only reach about 12 m (39 ft) in height in such situations. Its horticultural appeal stems from its profuse and attractive flowering. It can be propagated by seed or cuttings but will flower sooner when grown from cuttings. It grows well in subtropical gardens with fair drainage and sunny aspect, but in cooler climates such as Sydney, the tree will not flower as profusely as it does in its native range.

=== Expo gold ===
The golden penda was selected as the theme plant for Expo 88. Cuttings of the tree were taken from a superior form from a garden in Brisbane and planted in flower in Brisbane to create a 'Sea of Gold'. In late autumn, the tree can still be seen in flower in gardens and lining streets across Brisbane.

== Gallery ==
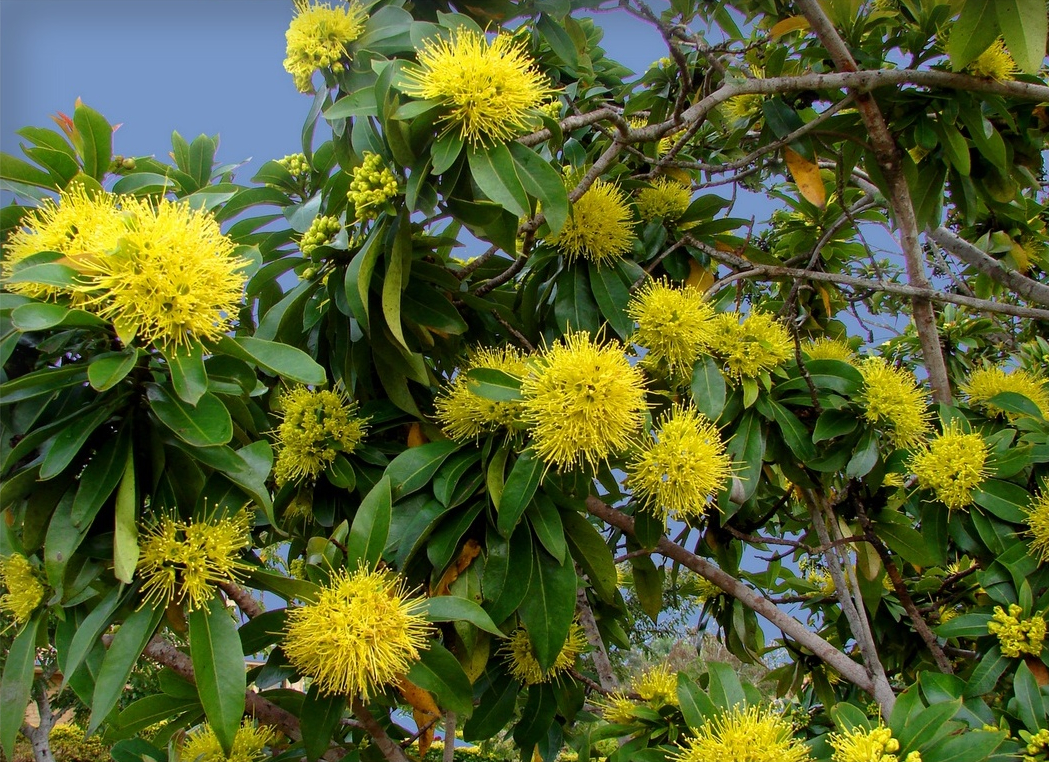
Flowers

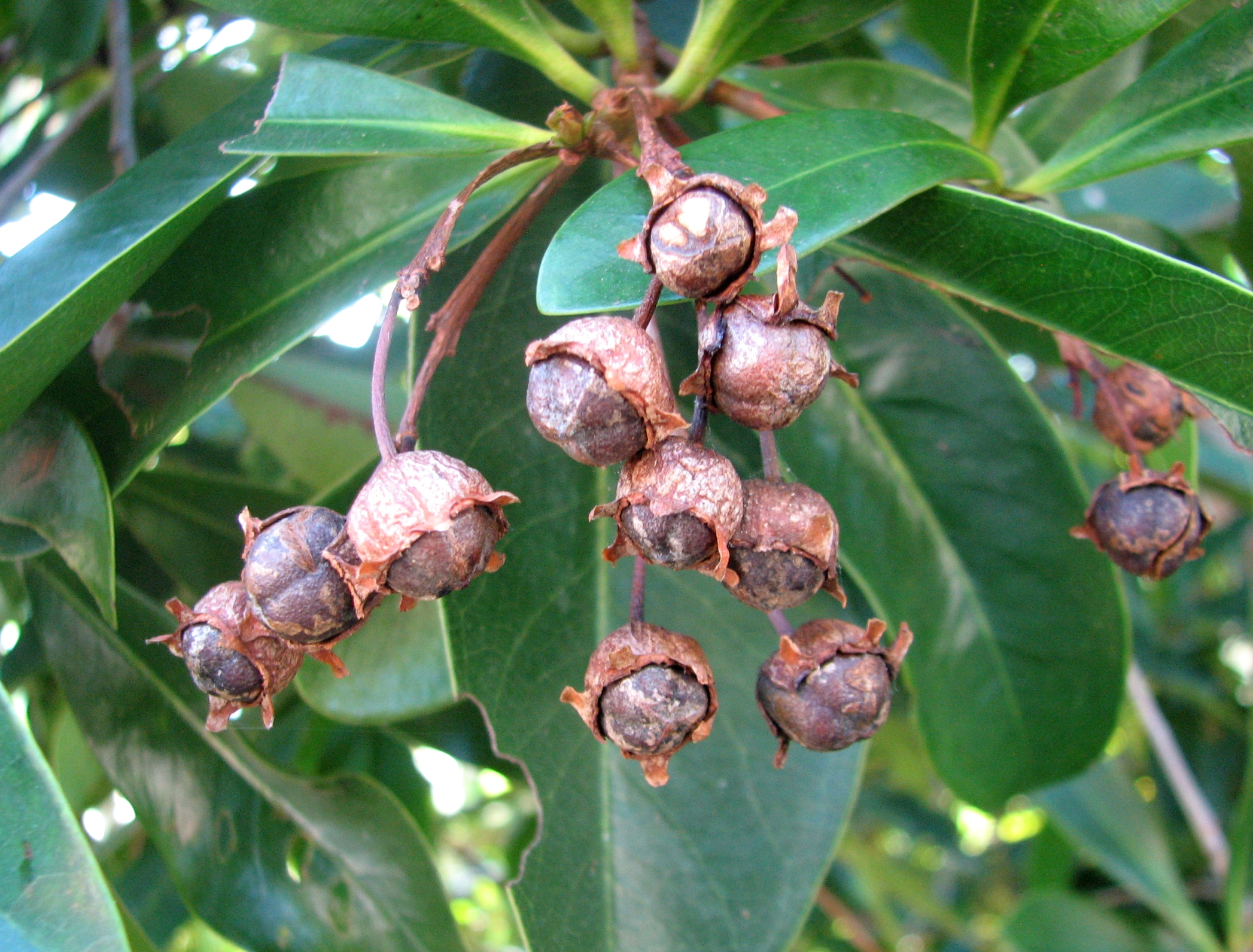
Fruit, almost ready to split open

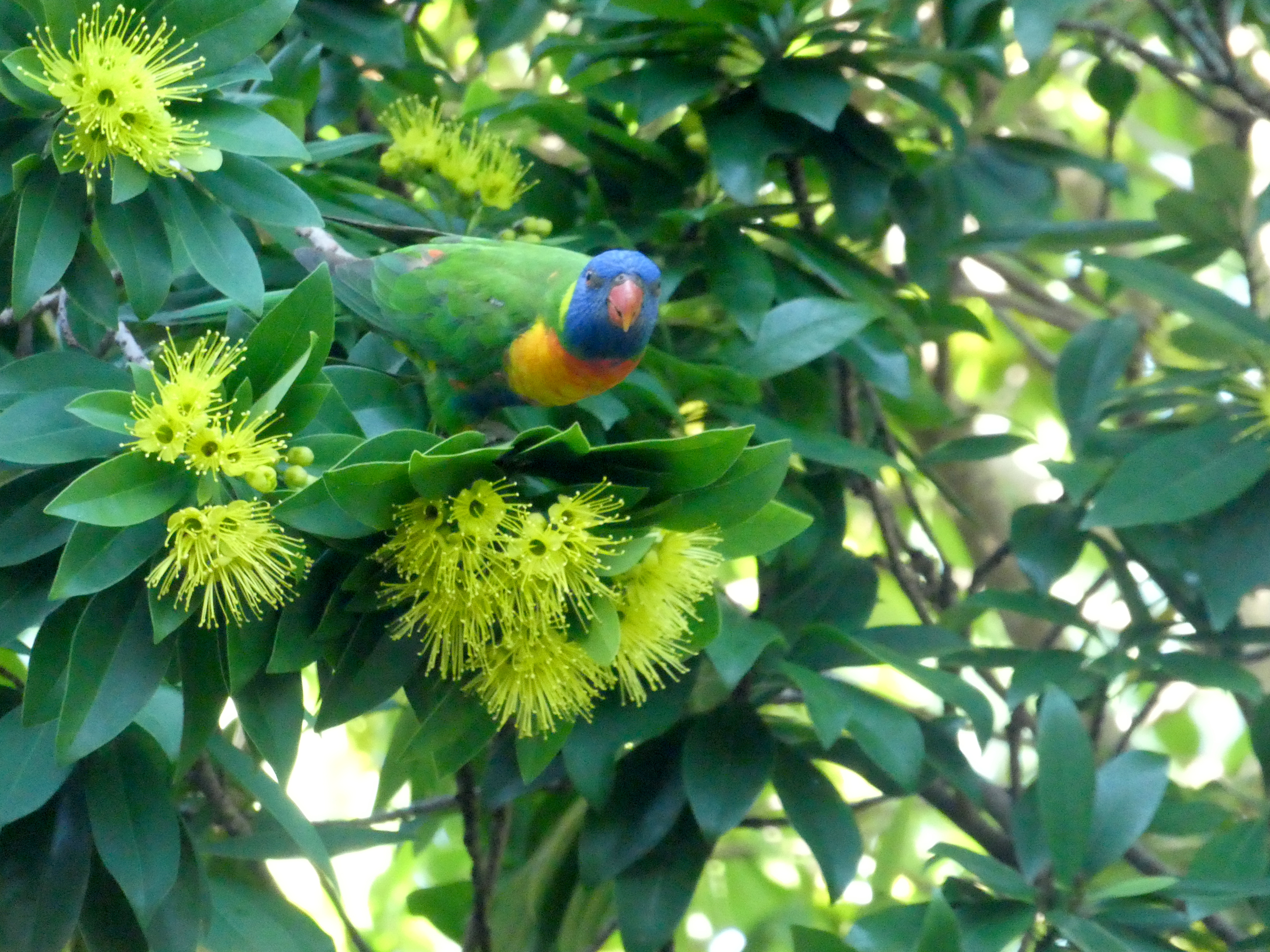
On the Cairns foreshore, with a rainbow lorikeet feeding on the flowers

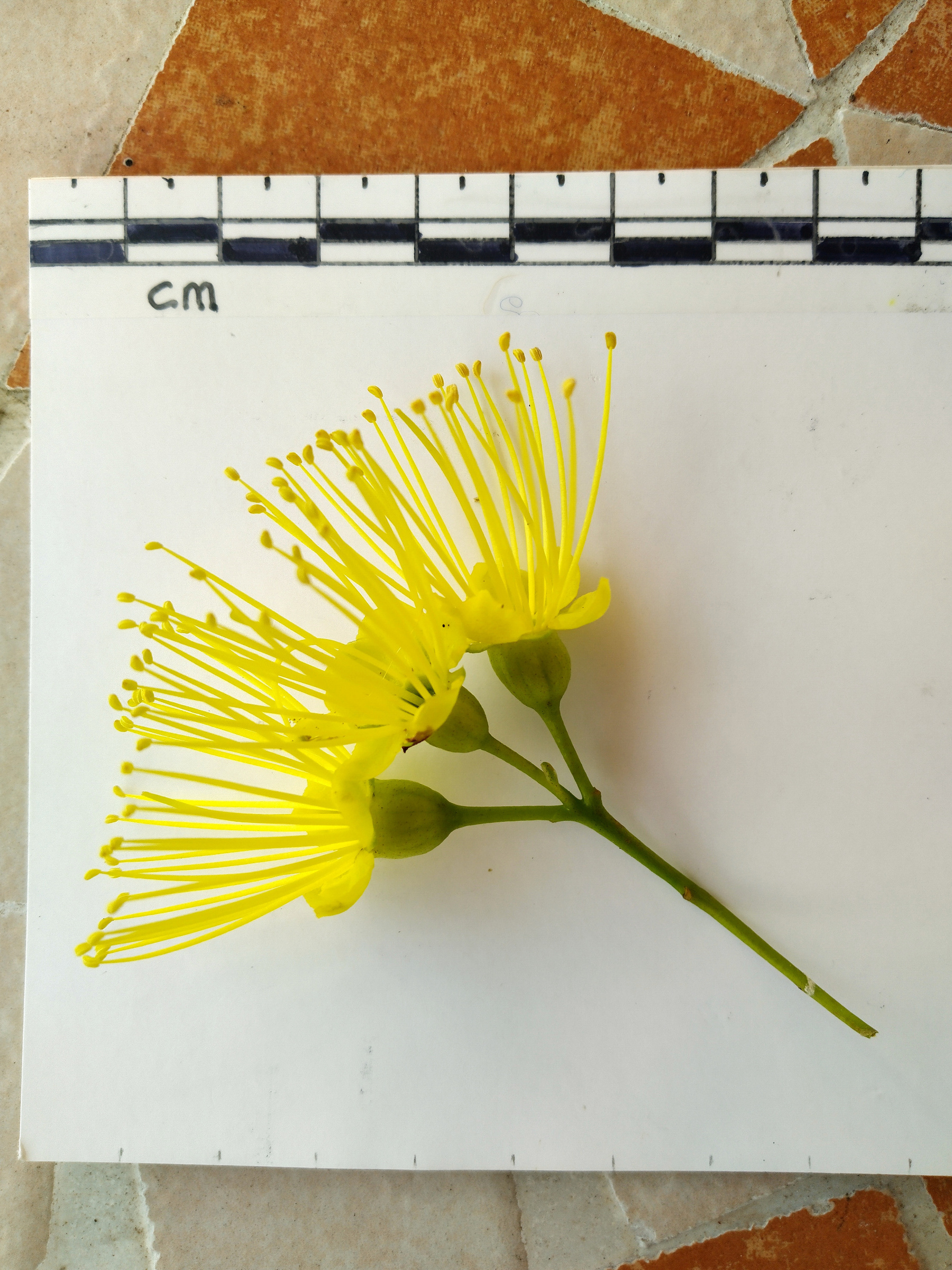
Individual flowers

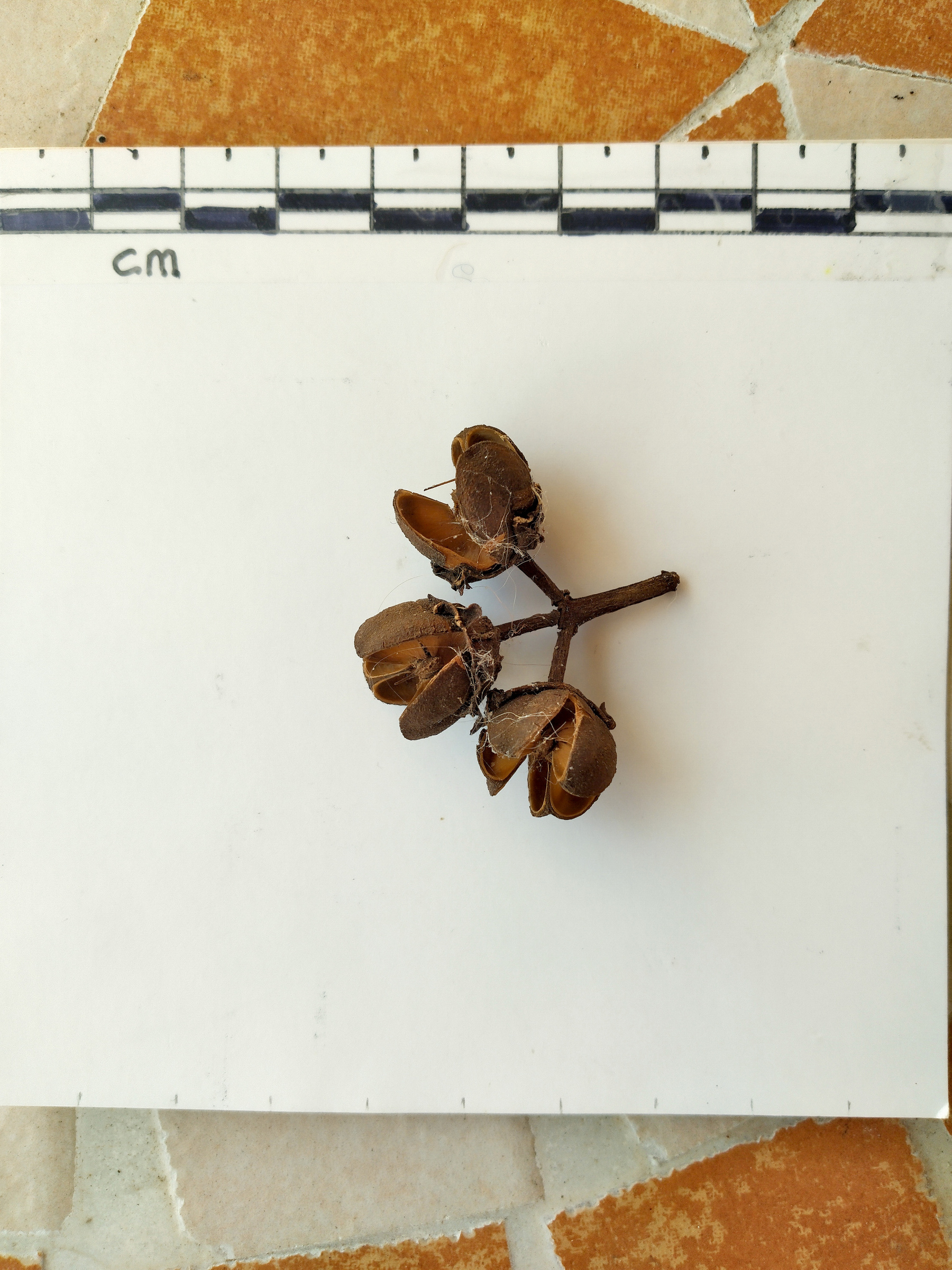
Dehisced fruit
