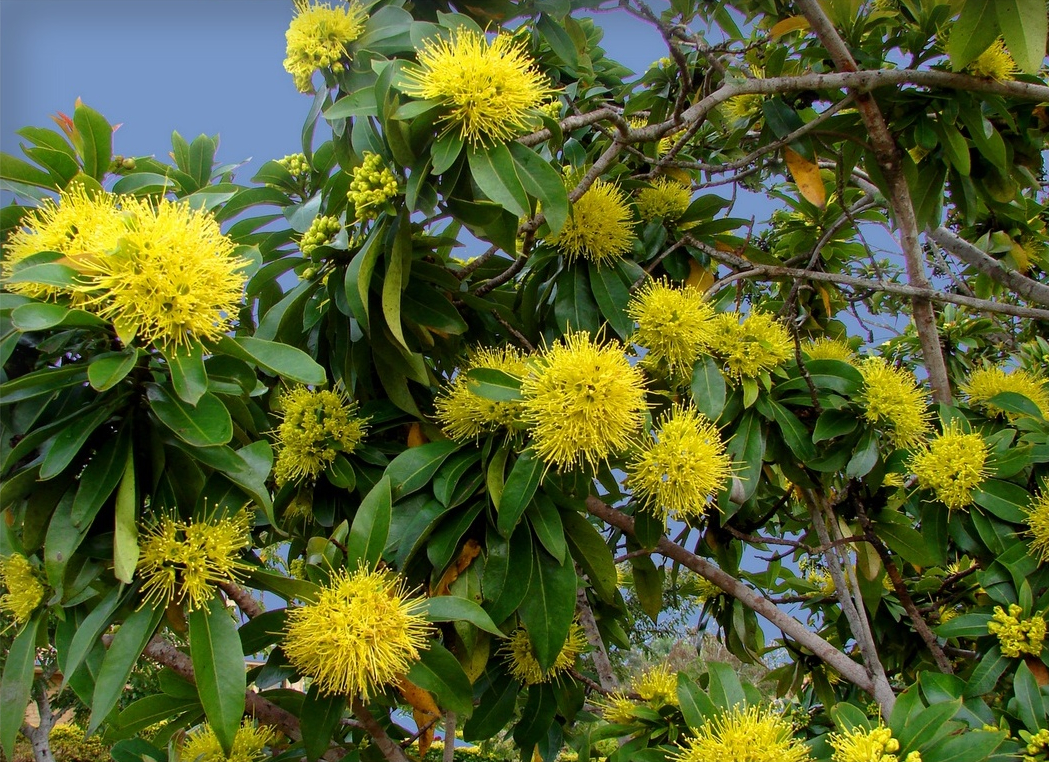
- Xanthostemon chrysanthus flowering

Scientific classification
- Kingdom: Plantae
- Clade: Tracheophytes
- Clade: Angiosperms
- Clade: Eudicots
- Clade: Rosids
- Order: Myrtales
- Family: Myrtaceae
- Subfamily: Myrtoideae
- Tribe: Xanthostemoneae
- Genus: Xanthostemon; F.Muell.

Type species
- Xanthostemon paradoxus F.Muell.

Synonyms
- Draparnaudia Montrouz.; Fremya Brongn. & Gris; Nani Adans.; Nania Miq.; Salisia Pancher ex Brongn. & Gris

= Xanthostemon =

Genus of flowering plants

Xanthostemon is a genus of plants in the myrtle family Myrtaceae, first described in 1857 by the German–born Australian botanist Ferdinand von Mueller. The genus is distributed across Malesia, Papuasia and northern Australia. The genera Pleurocalyptus and Purpureostemon from New Caledonia are morphologically close to Xanthostemon.

== Species ==
The following list includes all 48 species in this genus that are accepted by Plants of the World Online as of 3 August 2023

- Xanthostemon arenarius Peter G.Wilson - Queensland
- Xanthostemon aurantiacus (Brongn. & Gris) Schltr. - New Caledonia
- Xanthostemon bracteatus Merr. - Philippines
- Xanthostemon brassii Merr. - New Guinea
- Xanthostemon carlii J.W.Dawson - New Caledonia
- Xanthostemon chrysanthus (F.Muell.) Benth. - Queensland
- Xanthostemon confertiflorus Merr. - Sulawesi
- Xanthostemon crenulatus C.T.White - New Guinea, Queensland
- Xanthostemon eucalyptoides F.Muell. - Western Australia, Northern Territory
- Xanthostemon ferrugineus J.W.Dawson - New Caledonia
- Xanthostemon formosus Peter G.Wilson - Queensland
- Xanthostemon francii Guillaumin - New Caledonia
- Xanthostemon fruticosus Peter G.Wilson & Co - Philippines
- Xanthostemon glaucus Pamp. - New Caledonia
- Xanthostemon grandiflorus Gugerli - New Caledonia
- Xanthostemon graniticus Peter G.Wilson - Queensland
- Xanthostemon grisii Guillaumin - New Caledonia
- Xanthostemon gugerlii Merr. - New Caledonia
- Xanthostemon × intermedius Gugerli - New Caledonia
- Xanthostemon lateriflorus Guillaumin - New Caledonia
- Xanthostemon laurinus (Pamp.) Guillaumin - New Caledonia
- Xanthostemon longipes Guillaumin - New Caledonia
- Xanthostemon macrophyllus Pamp. - New Caledonia
- Xanthostemon melanoxylon Peter G.Wilson & Pitisopa - Solomon Islands
- Xanthostemon multiflorus (Montrouz.) Beauvis. - New Caledonia
- Xanthostemon myrtifolius (Brongn. & Gris) Pamp. ex Pampal. - New Caledonia
- Xanthostemon natunae Sedayu - Kalimantan
- Xanthostemon novaguineensis Valeton - New Guinea
- Xanthostemon oppositifolius F.M.Bailey - Queensland
- Xanthostemon paabaensis Gugerli - New Caledonia
- Xanthostemon paradoxus F.Muell. - Western Australia, Northern Territory
- Xanthostemon petiolatus (Valeton) Peter G.Wilson - Sulawesi to New Guinea
- Xanthostemon philippinensis Merr. - Luzon
- Xanthostemon psidioides (A.Cunn. ex Lindl.) Peter G.Wilson & J.T.Waterh. - Western Australia, Northern Territory
- Xanthostemon pubescens (Brongn. & Gris) Sebert & Pancher - New Caledonia
- Xanthostemon retusus Gugerli - New Caledonia
- Xanthostemon ruber (Brongn. & Gris) Sebert & Pancher - New Caledonia
- Xanthostemon sebertii Guillaumin - New Caledonia
- Xanthostemon speciosus Merr. - Philippines
- Xanthostemon sulfureus Guillaumin - New Caledonia
- Xanthostemon umbrosus (A.Cunn. ex Lindl.) Peter G.Wilson & J.T.Waterh. - Western Australia, Northern Territory, Queensland
- Xanthostemon velutinus (Gugerli) J.W.Dawson - New Caledonia
- Xanthostemon verdugonianus Náves ex Fern.-Vill. - Philippines
- Xanthostemon verticillatus (C.T.White & W.D.Francis) L.S.Sm. - Queensland
- Xanthostemon verus (Roxb.) Peter G.Wilson - Sulawesi to Maluku
- Xanthostemon vieillardii (Brongn. & Gris) Nied. - New Caledonia
- Xanthostemon whitei Gugerli - Queensland
- Xanthostemon xerophilus Peter G.Wilson - Queensland
- Xanthostemon youngii C.T.White & W.D.Francis - Queensland

== Other species ==
Provisionally named and awaiting formal publication

- Xanthostemon sp. Bolt Head (J.R.Clarkson+ 8805) Qld Herbarium
- Xanthostemon sp. Obiri Rock (J.A.Estbergs s.n.) NT Herbarium

== Gallery ==
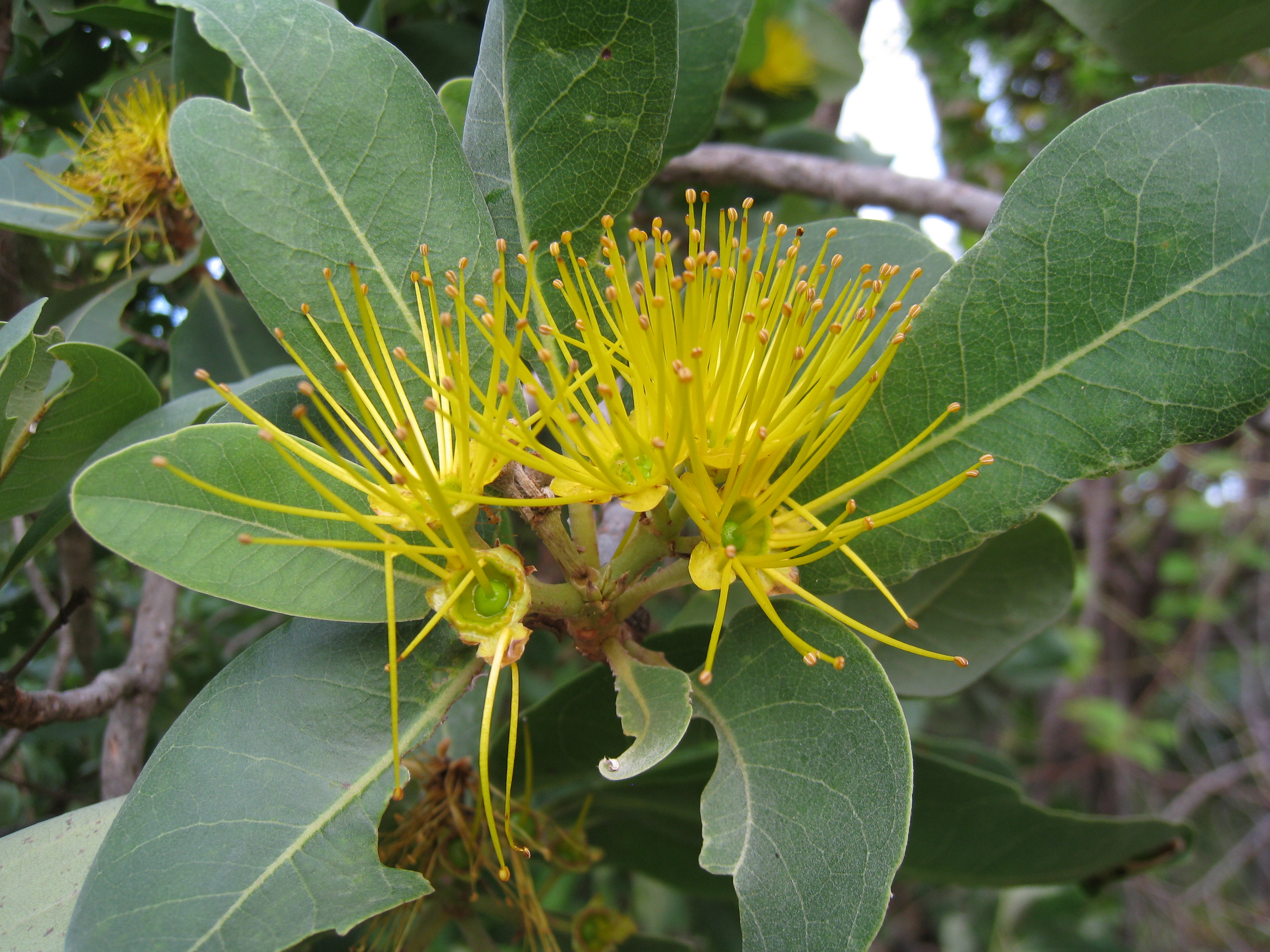
Xanthostemon paradoxus

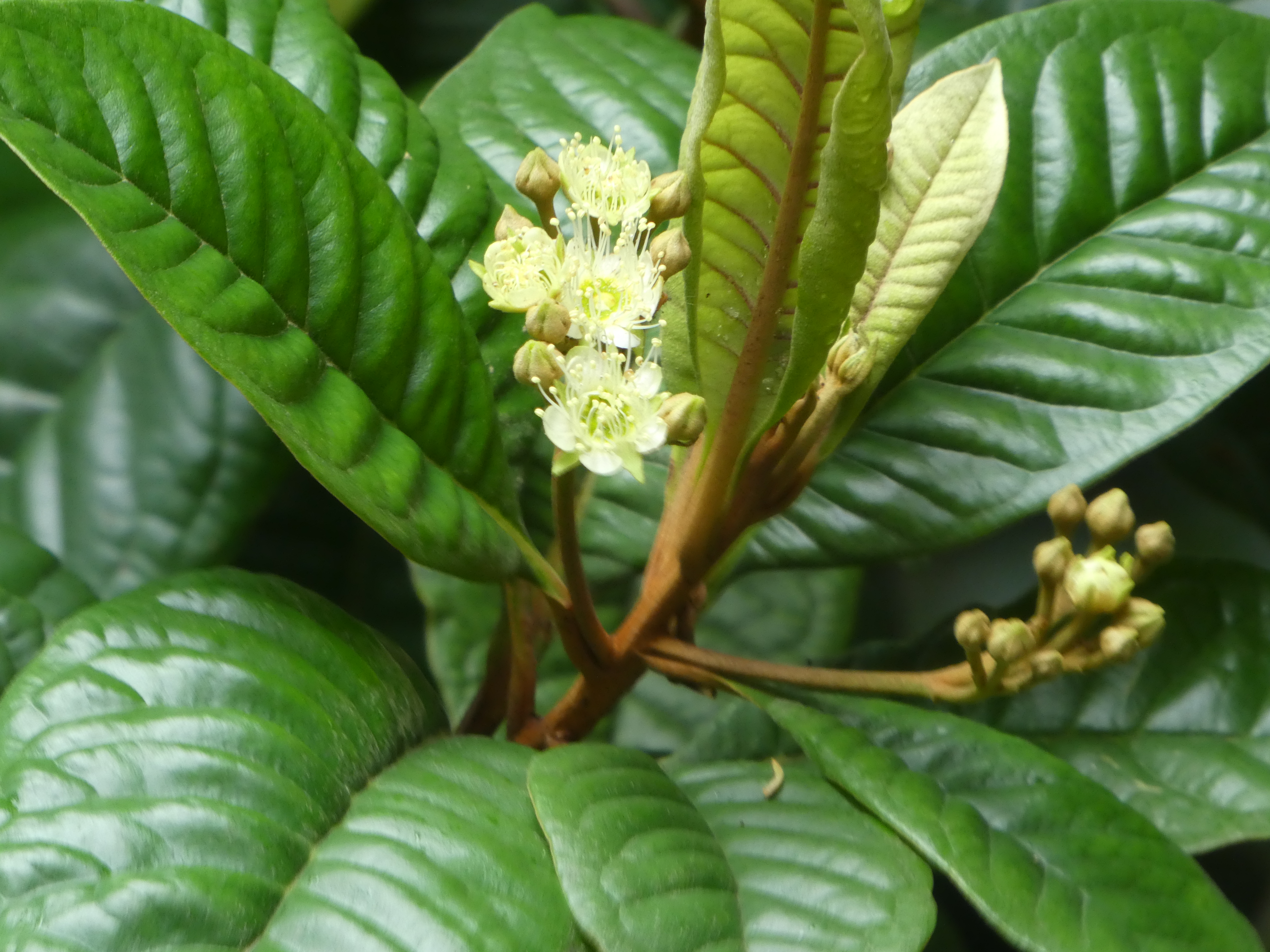
Xanthostemon graniticus

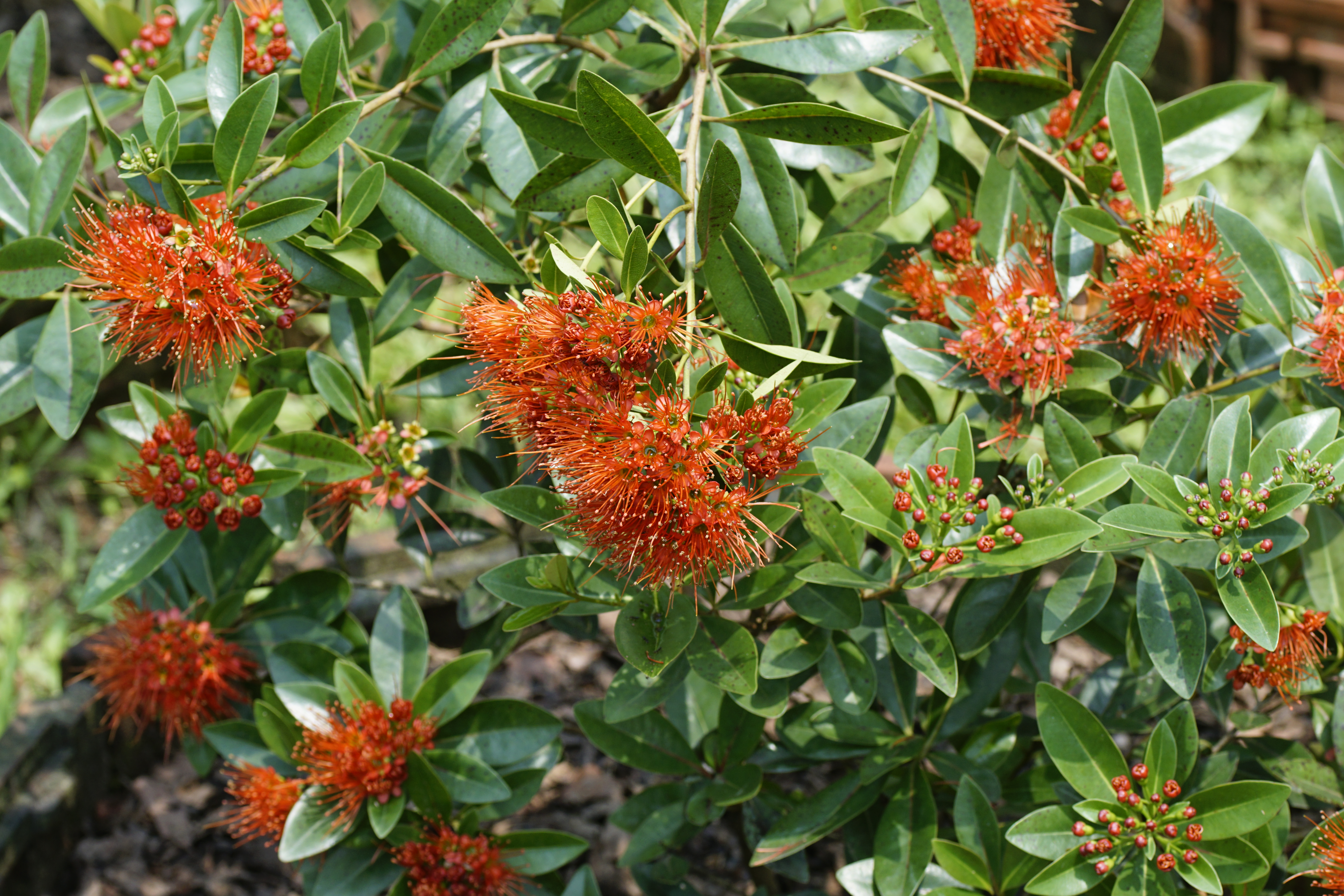
Xanthostemon youngii

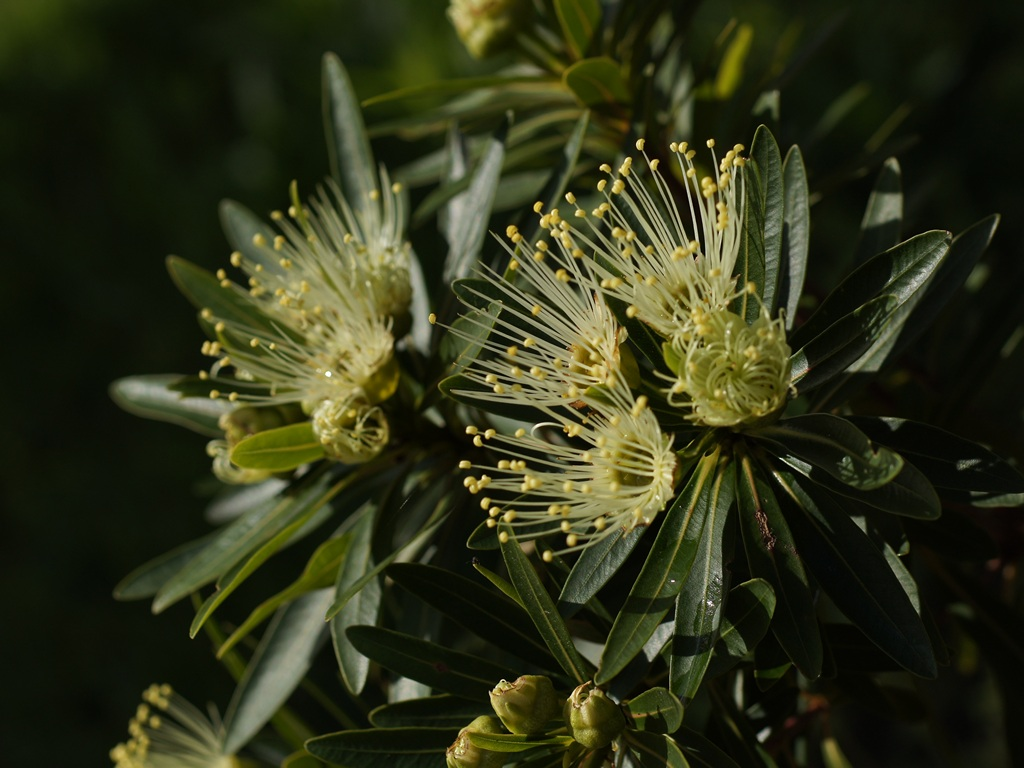
Xanthostemon verticillatus

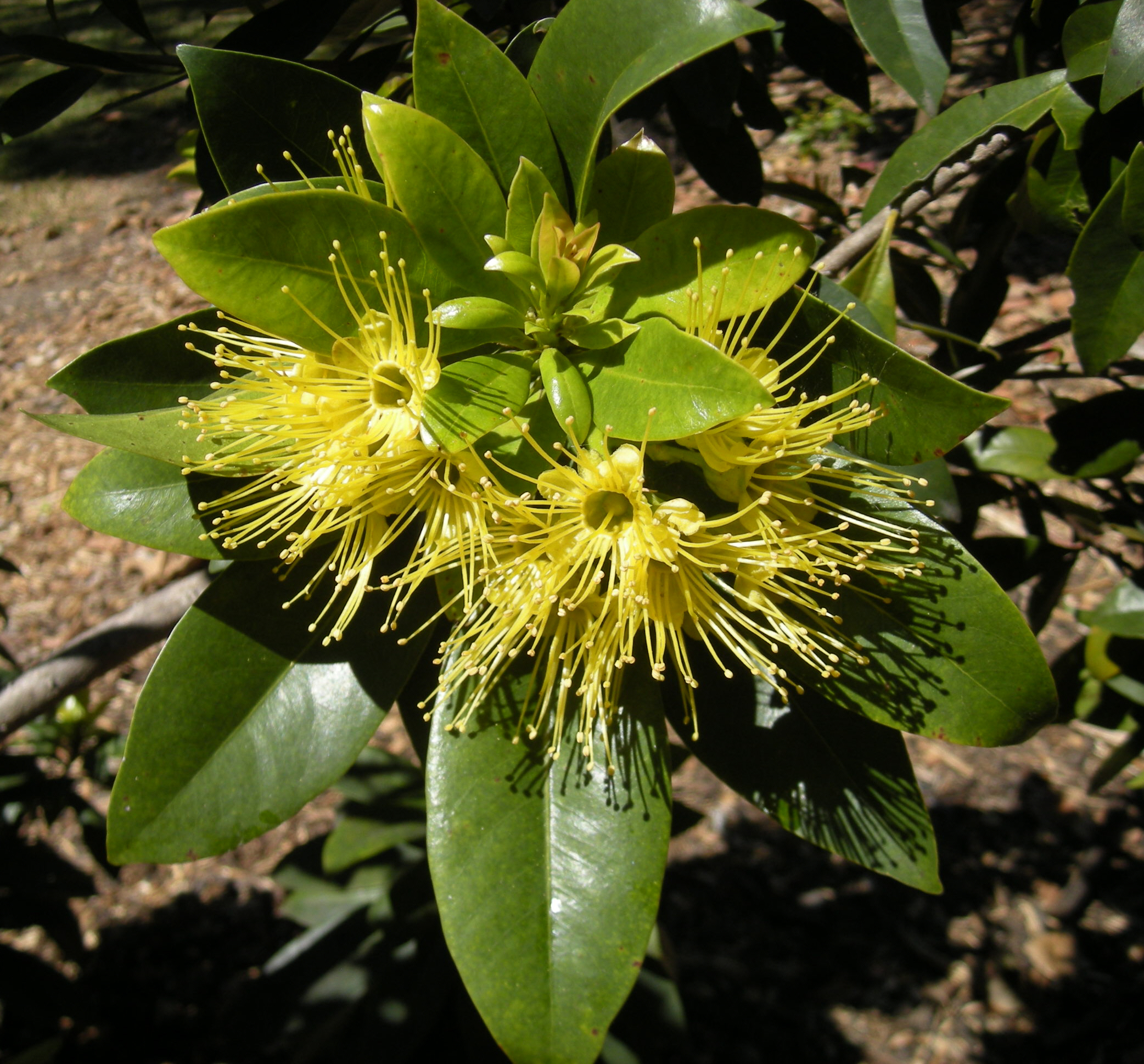
Xanthostemon chrysanthus
