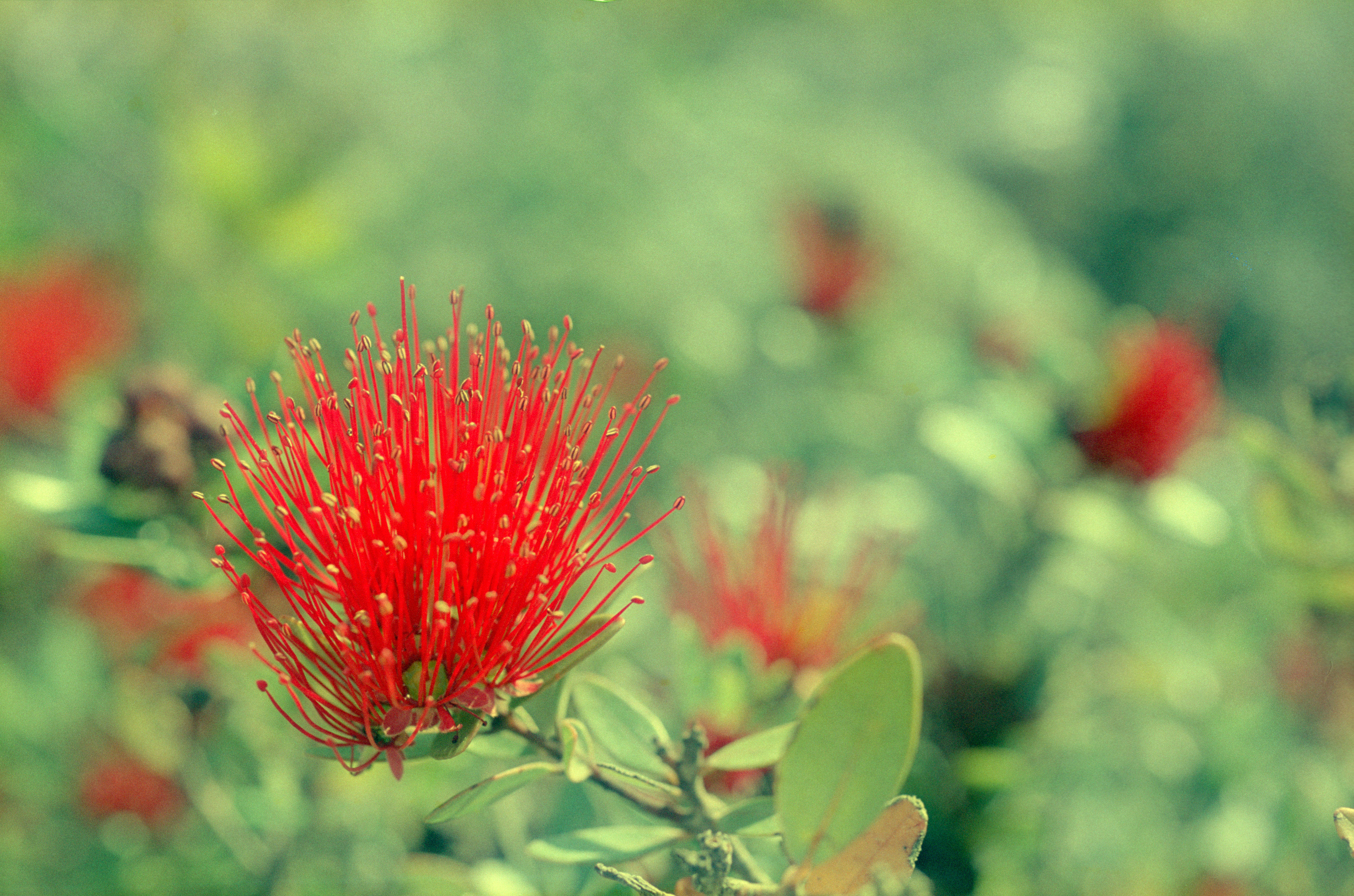

Conservation status
- Least Concern (IUCN 3.1)

Scientific classification
- Kingdom: Plantae
- Clade: Tracheophytes
- Clade: Angiosperms
- Clade: Eudicots
- Clade: Rosids
- Order: Myrtales
- Family: Myrtaceae
- Subfamily: Myrtoideae
- Tribe: Xanthostemoneae
- Genus: Purpureostemon; Gugerli
- Species: P. ciliatus

Binomial name
- Purpureostemon ciliatus (J.R.Forst. & G.Forst.) Gugerli

Synonyms
- Leptospermum ciliatum J.R.Forst. & G.Forst.; Melaleuca ciliata (J.R.Forst. & G.Forst.) G.Forst.; Metrosideros ciliata (J.R.Forst. & G.Forst.) Sm.; Stenospermum ciliatum (J.R.Forst. & G.Forst.) Heynh.; Fremya ciliata (J.R.Forst. & G.Forst.) Brongn. & Gris; Nania ciliata (J.R.Forst. & G.Forst.) Kuntze; Xanthostemon ciliatus (J.R.Forst. & G.Forst.) Nied.; Metrosideros buxifolia Dum.Cours.

= Purpureostemon =

Genus of plants

Purpureostemon is a genus of plant in the myrtle family Myrtaceae described as a genus in 1939. There is only one known species, Purpureostemon ciliatus, a shrub endemic to New Caledonia. Purpureostemon is related to Xanthostemon.
