= Xanthostemon arenarius =

Scientific classification
- Kingdom: Plantae
- Clade: Tracheophytes
- Clade: Angiosperms
- Clade: Eudicots
- Clade: Rosids
- Order: Myrtales
- Family: Myrtaceae
- Genus: Xanthostemon
- Species: X. arenarius

Binomial name
- Xanthostemon arenarius Peter G. Wilson 1993

Species of tree

Xanthostemon arenarius is a species of tree in the myrtle family Myrtaceae that is endemic to tropical north-eastern Queensland, Australia.

== Description ==
The tree usually grows to about 5–6 m in height, though is occasionally found as an emergent up to 20 m. The bark is plated and hard, grey to greyish brown. The spirally arranged leaves are about 5–9 cm long by 2–4.5 cm wide. The flowers are yellow, with the inflorescences crowded at the ends of seasonal growth. The ovoid fruits are about 10–14 mm in diameter, containing flat seeds 4.25–6 mm long.

== Distribution and habitat ==
The species is known only from a restricted locality on the east coast of Queensland's Cape York Peninsula, north of Cooktown, in the Cape Bedford to Cape Flattery area. It grows on the grey or white sandy soils of Quaternary dunes, in closed forest dominated by Asteromyrtus angustifolia or Araucaria, at an altitude of 20–80 m.
