= Xanthostemon sulfureus =

Conservation status
- Vulnerable (IUCN 2.3)

Scientific classification
- Kingdom: Plantae
- Clade: Tracheophytes
- Clade: Angiosperms
- Clade: Eudicots
- Clade: Rosids
- Order: Myrtales
- Family: Myrtaceae
- Genus: Xanthostemon
- Species: X. sulfureus

Binomial name
- Xanthostemon sulfureus Guillaumin

Species of flowering plant

Xanthostemon sulfureus is a species of flowering plant in the family Myrtaceae. It is a shrub or tree endemic to New Caledonia. It is native to the southeast of Grande Terre near Yaté, where it grows in remnant maquis shrubland and low forest. It is threatened by habitat loss.
