= Xanthostemon formosus =

Conservation status
- Endangered (EPBC Act)

Scientific classification
- Kingdom: Plantae
- Clade: Tracheophytes
- Clade: Angiosperms
- Clade: Eudicots
- Clade: Rosids
- Order: Myrtales
- Family: Myrtaceae
- Genus: Xanthostemon
- Species: X. formosus

Binomial name
- Xanthostemon formosus Peter G. Wilson

Species of tree

Xanthostemon formosus is a species of tree in the myrtle family Myrtaceae that is endemic to north-eastern Queensland, Australia.

== Description ==
The species may reach a height of 18 m with a stem diameter of 30 cm. The bark is grey and flaky. The crowded leaves are about 12–22 cm long by 2–4.5 cm wide, forming whorls on the twigs. The flowers are greenish-yellow. The fruits are globular, about 12–20 mm in diameter, containing flat seeds 4–5 mm across.

== Distribution and habitat ==
Endemic to the wet tropics of north-eastern Queensland, the species is restricted to a few streams between the Daintree River and Cape Tribulation, with an altitudinal range from close to sea level to 100 m. It grows as a rheophyte along rocky or boulder-strewn streams flowing through rainforest.
