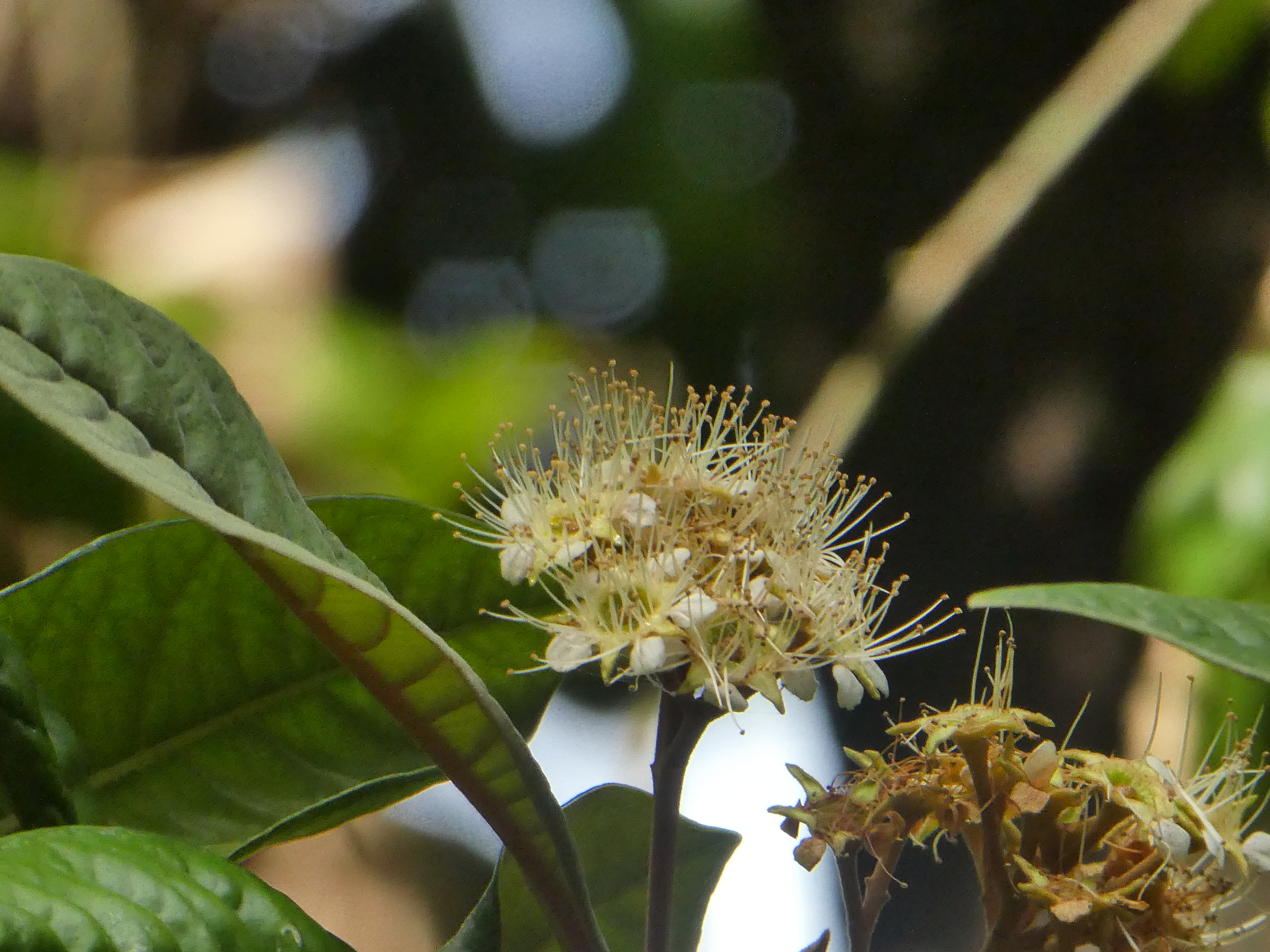
- At Cairns Botanic Gardens; July 2023

Conservation status
- Vulnerable (NCA)

Scientific classification
- Kingdom: Plantae
- Clade: Tracheophytes
- Clade: Angiosperms
- Clade: Eudicots
- Clade: Rosids
- Order: Myrtales
- Family: Myrtaceae
- Genus: Xanthostemon
- Species: X. graniticus

Binomial name
- Xanthostemon graniticus Peter G.Wilson

= Xanthostemon graniticus =

Granite penda

Species of flowering plant

Xanthostemon graniticus, commonly known as granite penda or mountain penda, is a species of plant in the family Myrtaceae, endemic to a very small part of northeastern Queensland, Australia. It is an evergreen shrub or small tree growing up to 13 m (43 ft) high with brown, flaky bark and stiff, bullate (corrugated) leaves. It inhabits open forests in the vicinity of Mount Pieter Botte, in peaty soils beside creeks at altitudes between 600 and 800 m (2,000 and 2,600 ft). It is the only species in the genus known to grow in granitic soil. The species was first described by Australian botanist Peter Gordon Wilson in 1990.

== Conservation ==
This species is listed by the Queensland Department of Environment and Science as vulnerable. As of December 2024, it has not been assessed by the International Union for Conservation of Nature (IUCN).
