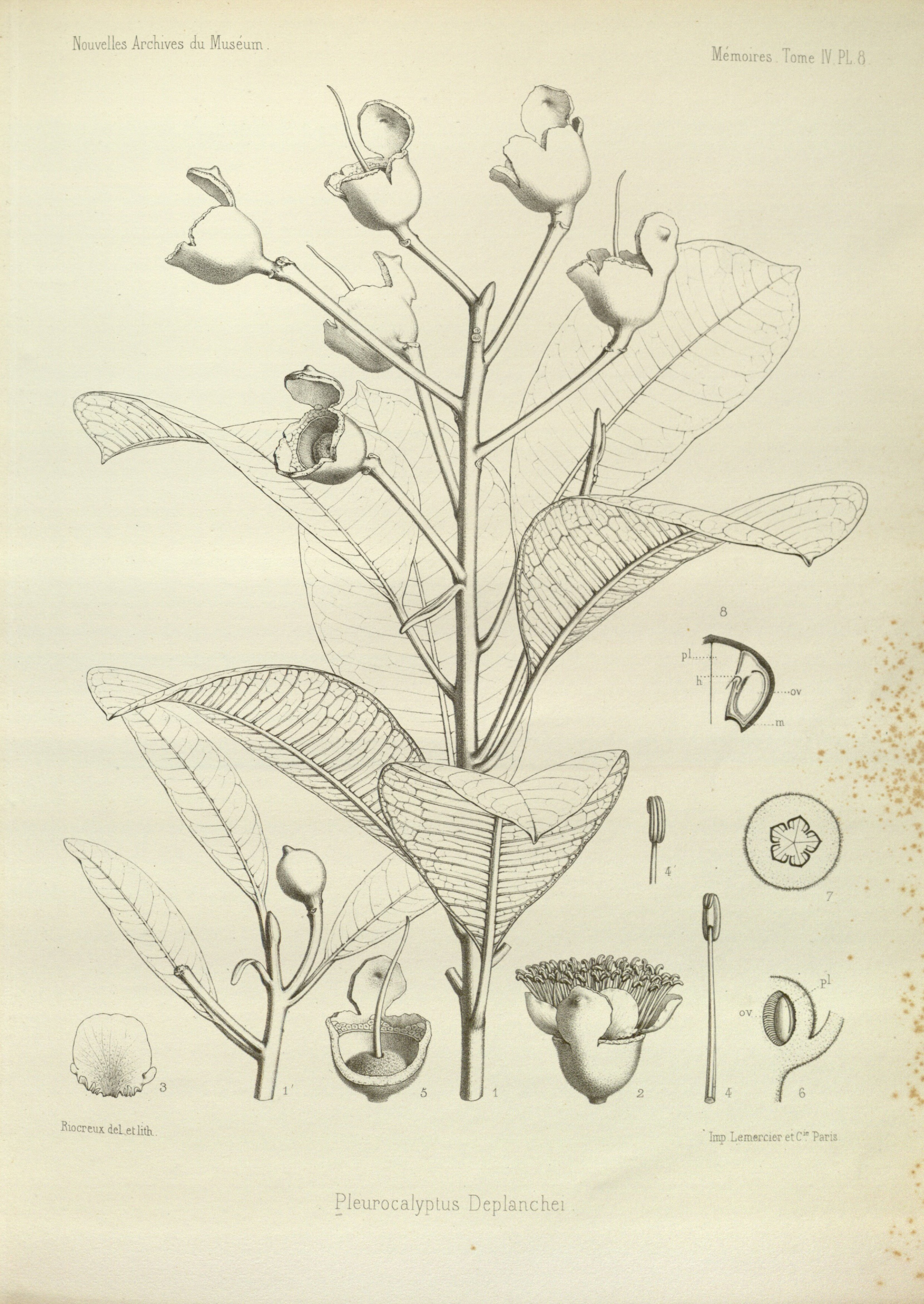
- Pleurocalyptus pancheri

Scientific classification
- Kingdom: Plantae
- Clade: Tracheophytes
- Clade: Angiosperms
- Clade: Eudicots
- Clade: Rosids
- Order: Myrtales
- Family: Myrtaceae
- Subfamily: Myrtoideae
- Tribe: Xanthostemoneae
- Genus: Pleurocalyptus; Brongn. & Gris

= Pleurocalyptus =

Family of shrubs and trees

Pleurocalyptus is a group of shrubs and small trees in the family Myrtaceae, first described as a genus in 1868. The entire genus is endemic to New Caledonia. It is closely related to Xanthostemon.

== Species ==
1. Pleurocalyptus austrocaledonicus (Guillaumin) J.W.Dawson
2. Pleurocalyptus pancheri (Brongn. & Gris) J.W.Dawson
