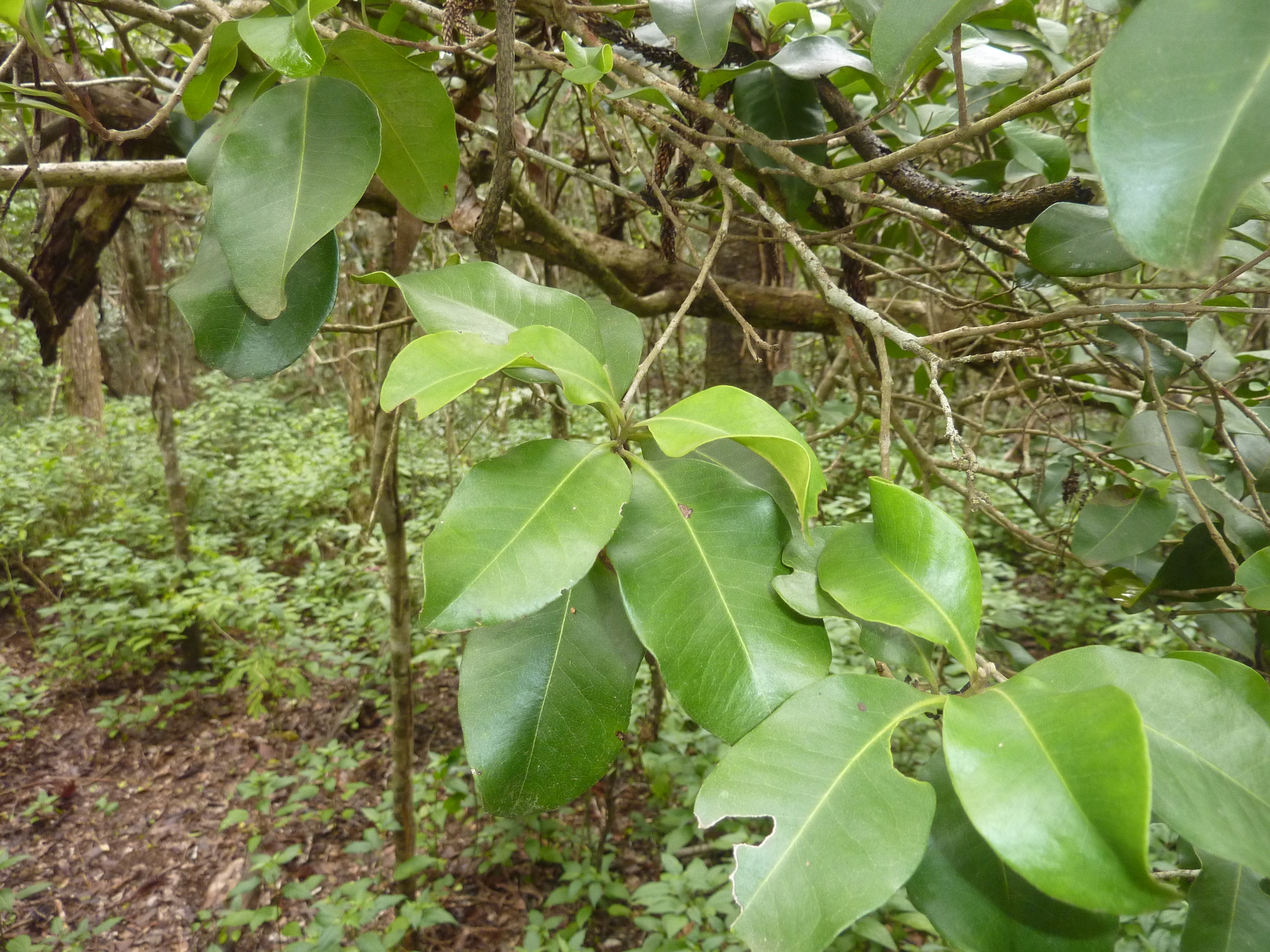

Conservation status
- Vulnerable (IUCN 3.1)

Scientific classification
- Kingdom: Plantae
- Clade: Tracheophytes
- Clade: Angiosperms
- Clade: Eudicots
- Clade: Rosids
- Order: Myrtales
- Family: Myrtaceae
- Genus: Xanthostemon
- Species: X. oppositifolius

Binomial name
- Xanthostemon oppositifolius F.M.Bailey

= Xanthostemon oppositifolius =

Species of flowering plant

Xanthostemon oppositifolius is a species of flowering plant in the family Myrtaceae. It is a tree endemic to southeastern Queensland in Australia. It is a tall tree, up to 40 metres tall. It flowering from May to September and produces fruits in September and October. It grows in coastal and sub-coastal rainforest, from sea level up to 300 metres elevation. It typically grows along streams, on alluvial terraces, and occasionally on slopes and low ridges. It is threatened by habitat loss.
