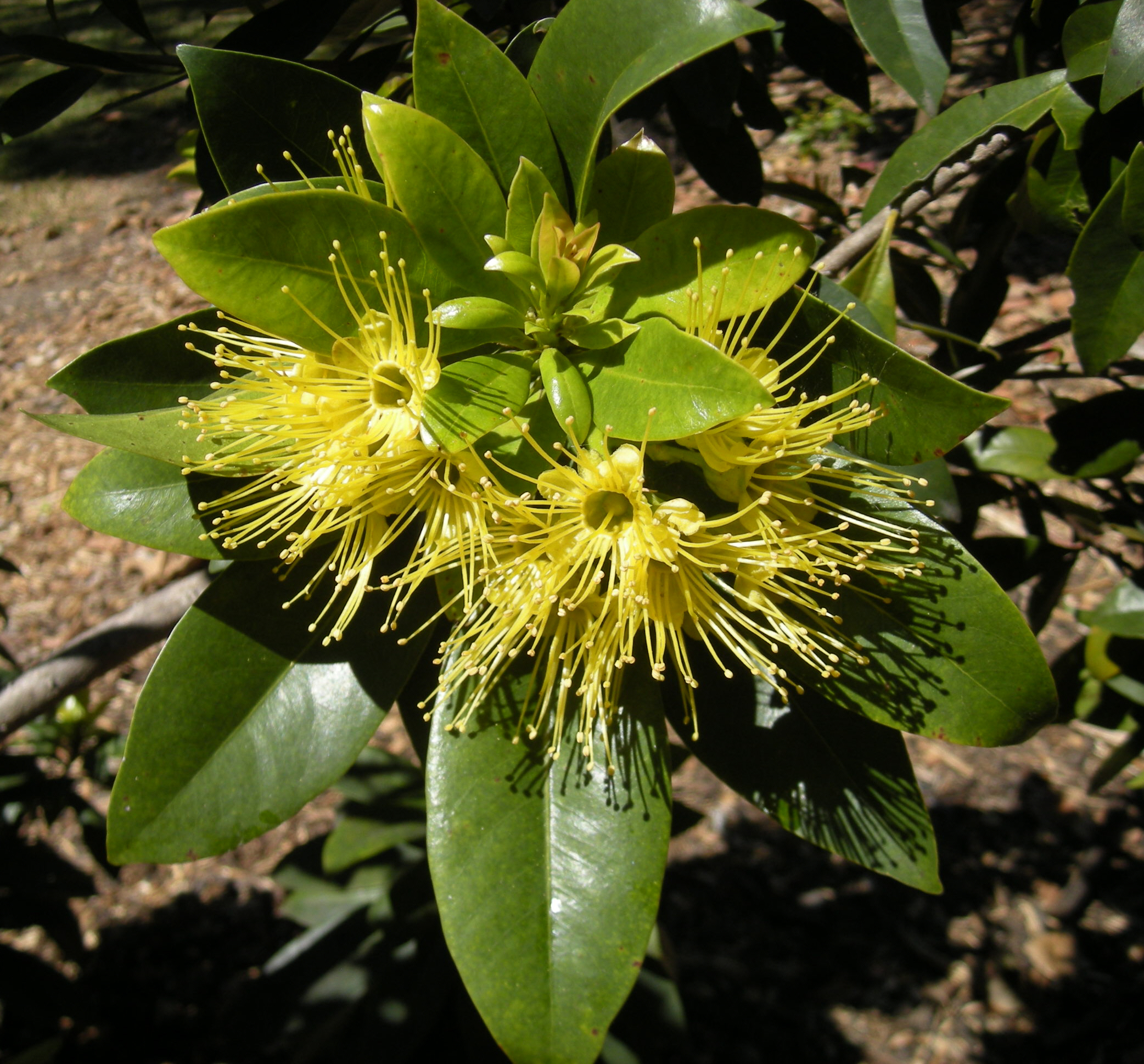
- Xanthostemon chrysanthus

Scientific classification
- Kingdom: Plantae
- Clade: Tracheophytes
- Clade: Angiosperms
- Clade: Eudicots
- Clade: Rosids
- Order: Myrtales
- Family: Myrtaceae
- Subfamily: Myrtoideae
- Tribe: Xanthostemoneae; Peter G.Wilson

= Xanthostemoneae =

Tribe of flowering plants

Xanthostemoneae is a tribe in the plant family Myrtaceae. from Australia, New Caledonia, New Guinea, Solomon Islands, eastern Indonesia and the Philippines.

== Genera ==
- Xanthostemon
- Pleurocalyptus
- Purpureostemon
