= Xanthostemon glaucus =

Conservation status
- Critically Endangered (IUCN 2.3)

Scientific classification
- Kingdom: Plantae
- Clade: Tracheophytes
- Clade: Angiosperms
- Clade: Eudicots
- Clade: Rosids
- Order: Myrtales
- Family: Myrtaceae
- Genus: Xanthostemon
- Species: X. glaucus

Binomial name
- Xanthostemon glaucus Pamp.

Synonyms
- Fremya glauca Vieill. ex Pamp. & Pampal.

Species of flowering plant

Xanthostemon glaucus is a species of flowering plant in the family Myrtaceae. It is a shrub endemic to west-northwestern New Caledonia.
