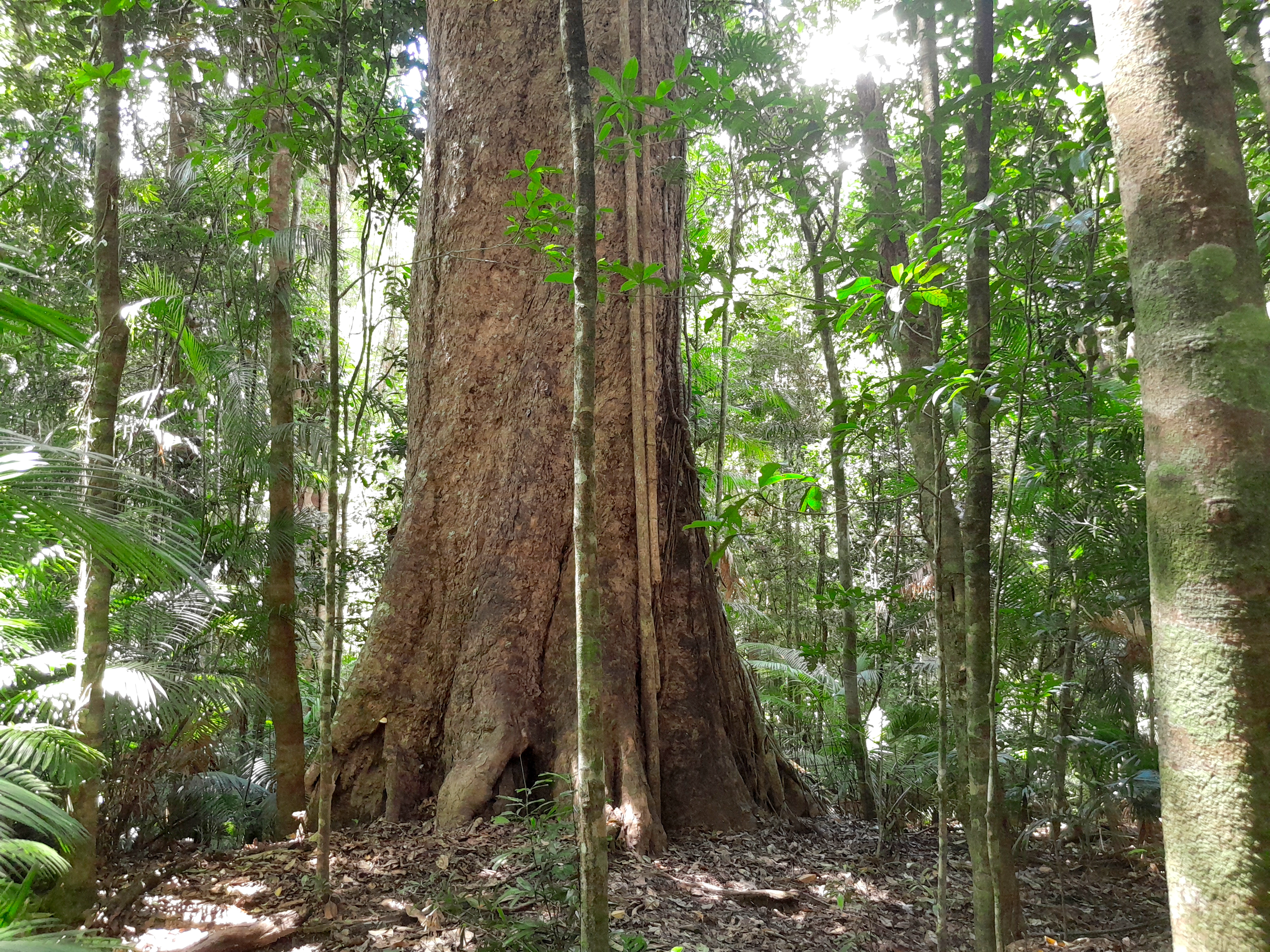
- In rainforest near Cairns, Queensland

Conservation status
- Least Concern (NCA)

Scientific classification
- Kingdom: Plantae
- Clade: Tracheophytes
- Clade: Angiosperms
- Clade: Eudicots
- Clade: Rosids
- Order: Myrtales
- Family: Myrtaceae
- Genus: Xanthostemon
- Species: X. whitei

Binomial name
- Xanthostemon whitei Gugerli

Synonyms
- Xanthostemon pubescens C.T.White

= Xanthostemon whitei =

Atherton penda

Species of flowering plant

Xanthostemon whitei, commonly known as Atherton penda or red penda, is a species of plants in the clove and eucalyptus family Myrtaceae found only in the Wet Tropics bioregion of Queensland, Australia. It is a large evergreen rainforest tree up to 45 m (148 ft) tall and a trunk diameter of up to 3 m (9.8 ft). Old trees have large buttresses and the trunk is marked by small hollows where bark has been shed. It was first described (informally) by Cyril Tenison White in 1917, and later formally described by German botanist Karl Gugerli.

Its very hard timber meant that early timber cutters ignored the trees, and many large specimens can still be seen in the region's National Parks.

== Conservation ==
This species is listed as least concern under the Queensland Government's Nature Conservation Act. As of December 2024, it has not been assessed by the International Union for Conservation of Nature (IUCN).
