= Xanthostemon umbrosus =

Conservation status
- Data Deficient (IUCN 3.1)

- Priority One — Poorly Known Taxa (DEC)

Scientific classification
- Kingdom: Plantae
- Clade: Tracheophytes
- Clade: Angiosperms
- Clade: Eudicots
- Clade: Rosids
- Order: Myrtales
- Family: Myrtaceae
- Genus: Xanthostemon
- Species: X. umbrosus

Binomial name
- Xanthostemon umbrosus (A.Cunn. ex Lindl.) Peter G.Wilson & J.T.Waterh.

Synonyms
- Metrosideros tetrapetala F.Muell.; Nania tetrapetala (F.Muell.) Kuntze; Tristania umbrosa A.Cunn. ex Lindl.

Species of tree

Xanthostemon umbrosus is a tree species in the family Myrtaceae that is endemic to Australia.

The tree typically grows to a height of 10 metres (33 ft). It blooms in between May and June producing yellow-cream coloured flowers.

It is found in sandstone crevices in the Kimberley region of Western Australia and is also found in the top end of the Northern Territory and north Queensland.
