= Xanthostemon crenulatus =

Conservation status
- Least Concern (IUCN 3.1)

Scientific classification
- Kingdom: Plantae
- Clade: Tracheophytes
- Clade: Angiosperms
- Clade: Eudicots
- Clade: Rosids
- Order: Myrtales
- Family: Myrtaceae
- Genus: Xanthostemon
- Species: X. crenulatus

Binomial name
- Xanthostemon crenulatus C.T.White

Species of flowering plant

Xanthostemon crenulatus is a species of tree in the family Myrtaceae. It is found in southern New Guinea in Papua New Guinea as well as in the Cape York Peninsula of Queensland, Australia.

== Habitat ==
It grows in monsoonal tropical rainforests in a variety of environments, from estuarine to inland habitats.

== Conservation ==
Under the Nature Conservation Act 1992 the species is regarded as Least Concern. The IUCN Red List also assesses it as Least Concern.
