= Xanthostemon bracteatus =

Conservation status
- Vulnerable (IUCN 3.1)

Scientific classification
- Kingdom: Plantae
- Clade: Tracheophytes
- Clade: Angiosperms
- Clade: Eudicots
- Clade: Rosids
- Order: Myrtales
- Family: Myrtaceae
- Genus: Xanthostemon
- Species: X. bracteatus

Binomial name
- Xanthostemon bracteatus Merr.

Species of flowering plant

Xanthostemon bracteatus is a species of flowering plant in the family Myrtaceae. It is a tree endemic in the Philippines. It grows in lowland riparian forests, typically on ultramafic substrates, from 10 to 800 metres elevation.
