= Xanthostemon eucalyptoides =

Conservation status
- Data Deficient (IUCN 3.1)

Scientific classification
- Kingdom: Plantae
- Clade: Tracheophytes
- Clade: Angiosperms
- Clade: Eudicots
- Clade: Rosids
- Order: Myrtales
- Family: Myrtaceae
- Genus: Xanthostemon
- Species: X. eucalyptoides

Binomial name
- Xanthostemon eucalyptoides F.Muell.

Synonyms
- Metrosideros eucalyptoides (F.Muell.) F.Muell.; Nania eucalyptoides (F.Muell.) Kuntze

Species of tree

Xanthostemon eucalyptoides is a tree species in the family Myrtaceae that is endemic to Australia.

The tree typically grows to a height of 8 to 25 metres (26 to 82 ft). It blooms between June and July producing cream coloured flowers. The stem has a cream or pale brown colour with brittle stripes usually visible in the outer blaze. The stem is covered in flaky grey bark. The evergreen leaf blades are amplexicaul with a length of 5 to 12 centimetres (2.0 to 4.7 in) and a width of 3 to 7 centimetres (1.18 to 2.76 in) and having curving lateral veins. The leaves are discolorous with an elliptic shape with a base that is obtuse to cordate and an apex that is obtuse or emarginate. The inflorescence is cymose, often several in the upper axils forming a terminal cluster of five to thirty flowers that are up to 40 millimetres (1.57 in) long. The fruits have a globular shape with a diameter of about 5 to 6 millimetres (0.20 to 0.24 in) with a calyx persistent at the base.

The tree has a typical lifespan of over 20 years forming seeds after 10 years. It has a lignotuber and will resprout basally following fire.

It is found in along watercourses in the east Kimberley region of Western Australia between the Prince Regent National Park and Wyndham where it grows in rocky sandstone-based soils. The plants range extends into the Northern Territory, from the Western Australian border as far east as the Arnhem Land plateau and south to about Pine Creek.

The species was first formally described by the botanist Ferdinand von Mueller in 1859 as part of the work Fragmenta Phytographiae Australiae. Synonyms include Metrosideros eucalyptoides, Nania eucalyptoides and Nania eucalyptodes.
