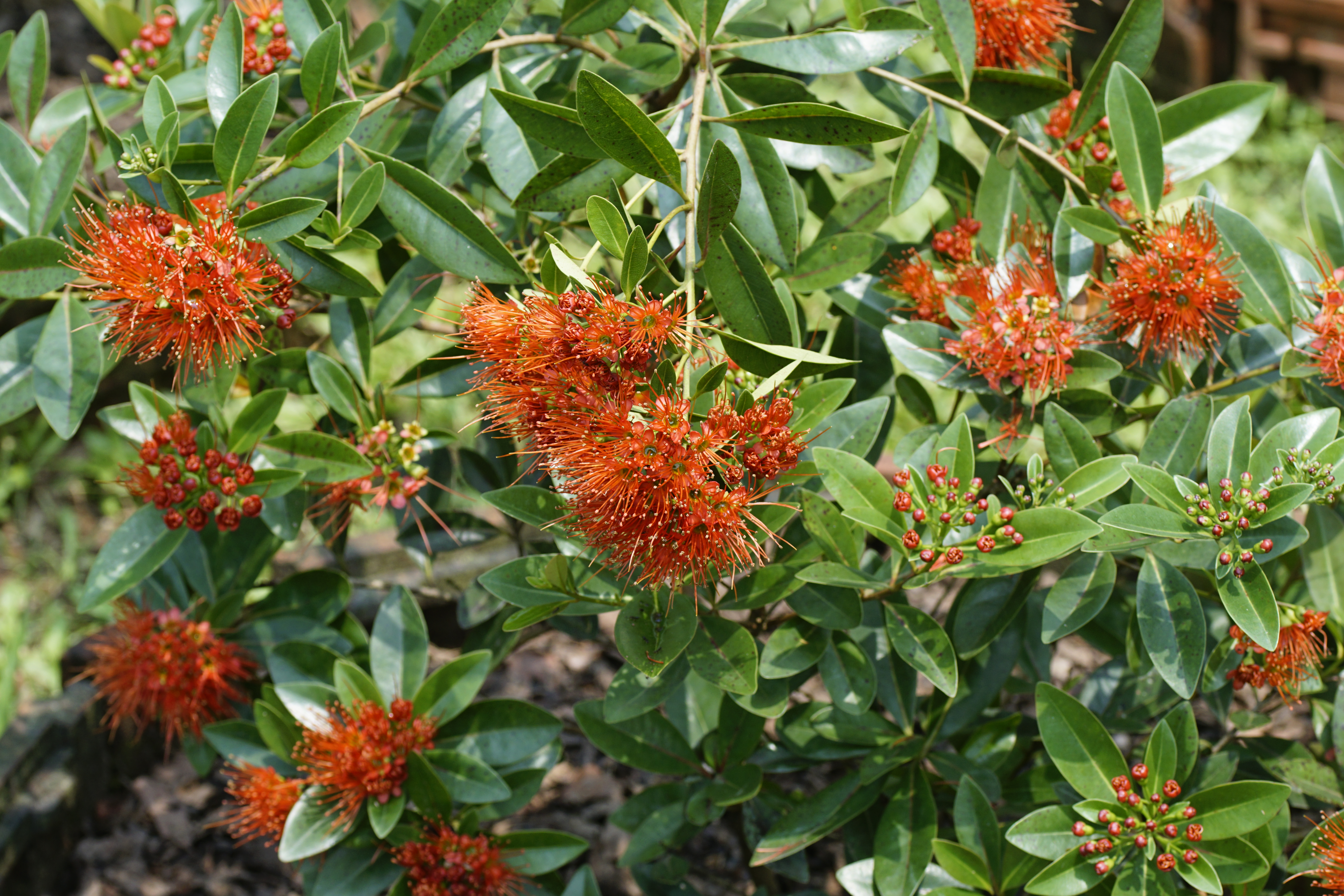

Scientific classification
- Kingdom: Plantae
- Clade: Tracheophytes
- Clade: Angiosperms
- Clade: Eudicots
- Clade: Rosids
- Order: Myrtales
- Family: Myrtaceae
- Genus: Xanthostemon
- Species: X. youngii

Binomial name
- Xanthostemon youngii C.T.White & W.D.Francis

= Xanthostemon youngii =

Species of tree in the myrtle family

Xanthostemon youngii, commonly known as crimson penda or red penda, is a species of trees endemic to North Queensland, constituting part of the plant family Myrtaceae.

It has showy red blooms, but has been difficult to keep alive in cultivation.

It is extremely prone to Myrtle Rust disease that has spread rapidly throughout the east coast of Australia.

This species was first formally described in 1926 by Cyril Tenison White and William Douglas Francis and named after Queensland naturalist J. Edgar Young (1871 - 1956), who first observed it.
