= Xanthostemon xerophilus =

Scientific classification
- Kingdom: Plantae
- Clade: Tracheophytes
- Clade: Angiosperms
- Clade: Eudicots
- Clade: Rosids
- Order: Myrtales
- Family: Myrtaceae
- Genus: Xanthostemon
- Species: X. xerophilus

Binomial name
- Xanthostemon xerophilus C.T.White

Species of flowering plant

Xanthostemon xerophilus is a species of tree in the family Myrtaceae. It is endemic to the Cape York Peninsula of Queensland, Australia.

== Habitat ==
It is found north and south of the Jardine River in layered open forest with Eucalyptus tetrodonta and Corymbia nesophila.

== Conservation ==
Under the Nature Conservation Act 1992 it is regarded as Least Concern.
