= Xanthostemon psidioides =

Conservation status
- Data Deficient (IUCN 3.1)

- Priority Two — Poorly Known Taxa (DEC)

Scientific classification
- Kingdom: Plantae
- Clade: Tracheophytes
- Clade: Angiosperms
- Clade: Eudicots
- Clade: Rosids
- Order: Myrtales
- Family: Myrtaceae
- Genus: Xanthostemon
- Species: X. psidioides

Binomial name
- Xanthostemon psidioides (A.Cunn. ex Lindl.) Peter G.Wilson & J.T.Waterh.

Synonyms
- Tristania psidioides A.Cunn. ex Lindl.

Species of shrub

Xanthostemon psidioides is a shrub or tree species in the family Myrtaceae that is endemic to Australia.

The spreading shrub or tree typically grows to a height of 6 metres (20 ft). It blooms in May producing cream-white coloured flowers.

It is found on and the base of sandstone cliffs in the Kimberley region of Western Australia near the Walcott Inlet and the Prince Regent National Park.
