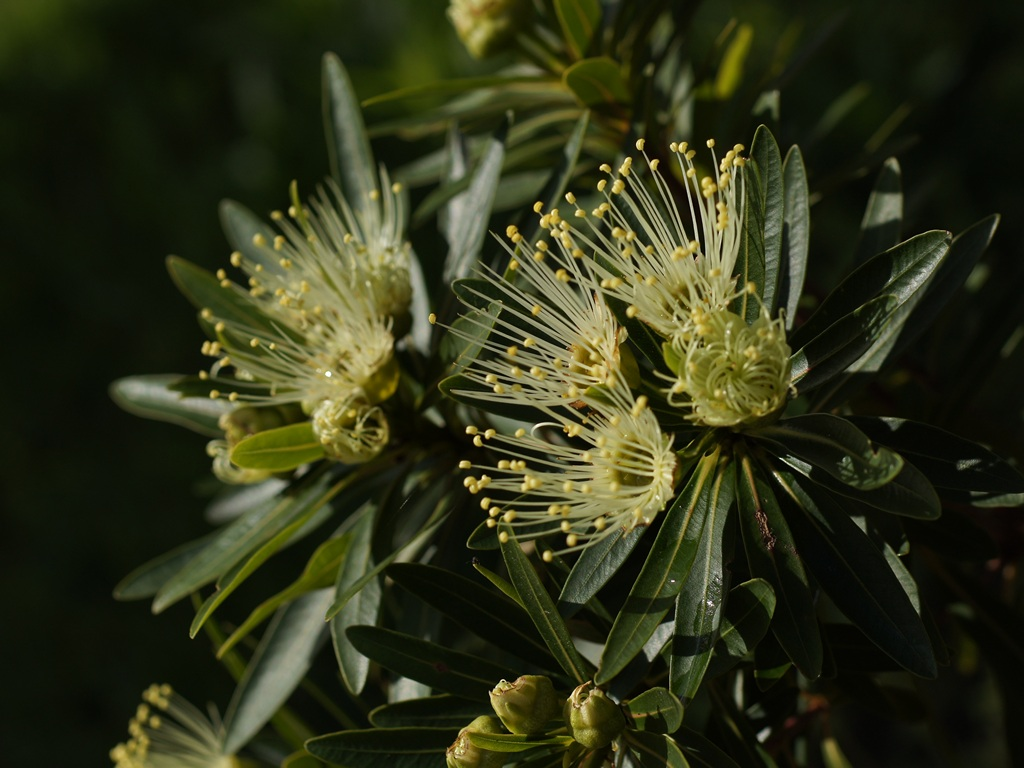
- Cultivated, Brisbane, 2011
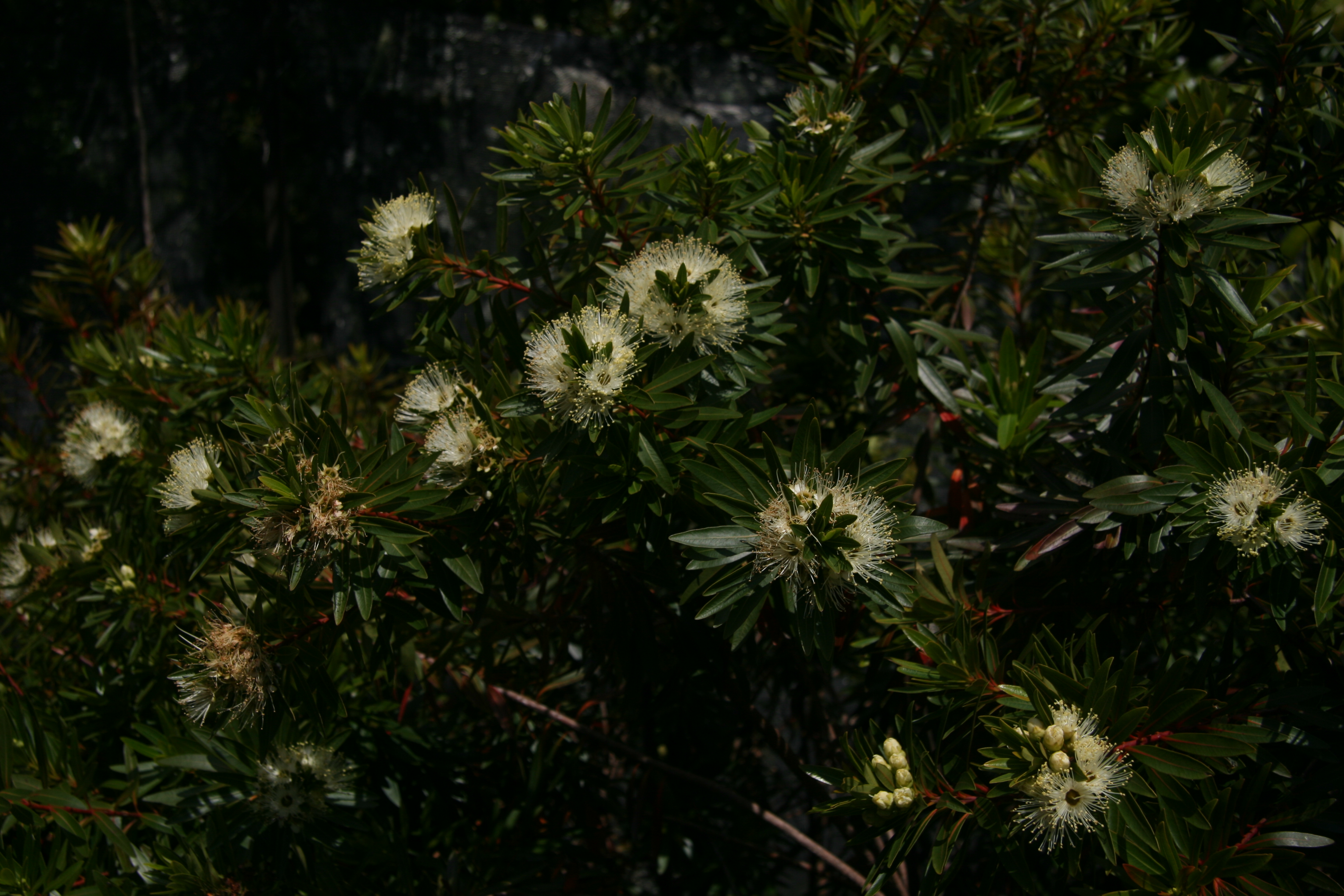
- Cultivated, Maleny, SE. Queensland, 2011

Scientific classification
- Kingdom: Plantae
- Clade: Tracheophytes
- Clade: Angiosperms
- Clade: Eudicots
- Clade: Rosids
- Order: Myrtales
- Family: Myrtaceae
- Genus: Xanthostemon
- Species: X. verticillatus

Binomial name
- Xanthostemon verticillatus (C.T.White & W.D.Francis) L.S.Sm.

= Xanthostemon verticillatus =

Species of tree

Xanthostemon verticillatus is a species of trees from the plant family Myrtaceae endemic to the Wet Tropics rainforests of northeastern Queensland.
