= List of plants of Malaysia =

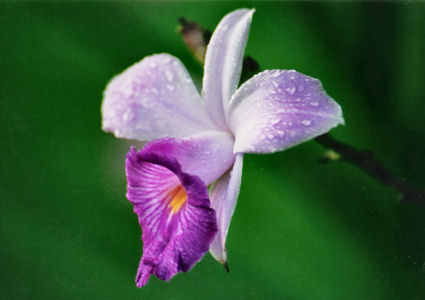
Bamboo orchid

Malaysia is a Megadiverse country, of which two thirds is covered in forest which is believed to be 130million years old. It is composed of a variety of types, although they are mainly dipterocarp forests. There are an estimated 8,500 species of vascular plants in Peninsular Malaysia, with another 15,000 in the East. The forests of East Malaysia are estimated to be the habitat of around 2,000 tree species, and are one of the most biodiverse areas in the world, with 240 different species of trees every hectare.

== Plants ==
- Areca gurita
- Areca triandra
- Bamboo orchid
- Dacrydium gibbsiae
- Dipterocarpus acutangulus
- Dipterocarpus caudatus
- Dipterocarpus confertus
- Dipterocarpus conformis
- Dipterocarpus coriaceus
- Dipterocarpus cornutus
- Dipterocarpus costulatus
- Dipterocarpus crinitus
- Dipterocarpus dyeri
- Dipterocarpus elongatus
- Dipterocarpus eurynchus
- Dipterocarpus geniculatus
- Dipterocarpus glabrigemmatus
- Dipterocarpus globosus
- Dipterocarpus gracilis
- Dipterocarpus hasseltii
- Dipterocarpus humeratus
- Dipterocarpus kerrii
- Dipterocarpus lamellatus
- Dipterocarpus ochraceus
- Dipterocarpus retusus
- Dipterocarpus sarawakensis
- Dipterocarpus semivestitus
- Dipterocarpus validus
- Dipterocarpus verrucosus
- Durian
- Nepenthes rajah
- Rafflesia arnoldii
- Rafflesia kerrii
- Ridleyandra chuana
- Vietnamese White Pine

== See also ==
- Endemic flora of Malaysia
- Endemic flora of Peninsular Malaysia
- Wildlife of Malaysia
