= Bukit Taviu Forest Reserve =

Protected area in Sabah, Malaysia

- IUCN category Ia (strict nature reserve)
- Location within Borneo
- Location: Sabah, Malaysia
- Nearest city: Telupid, Telupid District
- Coordinates: 5°40′10″N 116°55′02″E
- Area: 86.3 km^{2} (33.3 sq mi)
- Established: 1984
- Governing body: Sabah Forestry Department

Bukit Taviu Forest Reserve is a protected forest reserve in Ranau District of West Coast Division, Sabah, Malaysia. It was designated as a Class 1 Protection Forest by the Sabah Forestry Department in 1992. Its area is 8,630 hectares (86.3 km^{2}). The reserve is hilly and lacks rivers. The forest is mixed dipterocarp.

== Flora ==
Bukit Taviu Forest Reserve hosts threatened species such as Anisoptera laevis, Dipterocarpus acutangulus, Dipterocarpus applanatus, Dipterocarpus humeratus, Dipterocarpus tempehes, Shorea agamii, Shorea atrinervosa, Shorea confusa, Shorea flaviflora, Shorea hypoleuca, Shorea laevis, Shorea symingtonii and Vatica dulitensis. It also hosts Adinandra, Clethra, Dryobalanops, Hopea, Lithocarpus, Parashorea and Schizostachyum species.

== Fauna ==
Bukit Taviu Forest Reserve is home to orangutans. An aerial survey in 2002–2003 recorded a population of 53 orangutans.
