= Ulu Telupid Forest Reserve =

Protected area in Sabah, Malaysia

- IUCN category Ia (strict nature reserve)
- Location within Borneo
- Location: Sabah, Malaysia
- Nearest city: Telupid, Telupid District
- Coordinates: 5°34′12″N 116°56′43″E
- Area: 64.6 km^{2} (24.9 sq mi)
- Established: 1984
- Governing body: Sabah Forestry Department

Ulu Telupid Forest Reserve is a protected forest reserve in Tongod District of Sandakan Division, Sabah, Malaysia. First established in 1972, it was designated as a Class 1 Protection Forest by the Sabah Forestry Department in 1984. Its area is 6,460 hectares (64.6 km^{2}), down from its former size of 7,508 hectares (75.08 km^{2}). Prior to being established as a forest reserve, the area was used for logging and palm oil plantations. The reserve is mostly mountainous, consisting mainly of mixed dipterocarp forest. The land surrounding the reserve includes a town, oil palm plantations, rubber plantations, and rice paddies. It is threatened by fires and illegal logging. In some areas agricultural activities have encroached into the protected area. Since 2000 there has been a net loss of just under 2% of the reserve's forested area. There is a small level of ecotourism activity in the reserve, consisting of guided tours from a nearby village, which provides livelihood alternatives to logging and poaching.

== Flora ==
163 floral species have been identified within the reserve, the lowest diversity found within Sabah's inland forest reserves. 29 are endemic to Borneo, with none endemic to Sabah. Due to fire, illegal logging, and illegal agricultural activities, only around 40% of Ulu Telupid Forest Reserve remains primary forest, mostly in the upland interior areas of the reserve. The rest of the reserve's forest is secondary, including areas populated by pioneer species. It is an important area for tree species including, in upland areas of the reserve, Schima wallichii, Dipterocarpus confertus, Shorea atrinervosa, Shorea argentifolia and Shorea agamii. The reserve is also home to Anisoptera, Dipterocarpus, Dryobalanops, Hopea, Parashorea, Polyalthia, Shorea, Syzygium and Vatica species.
