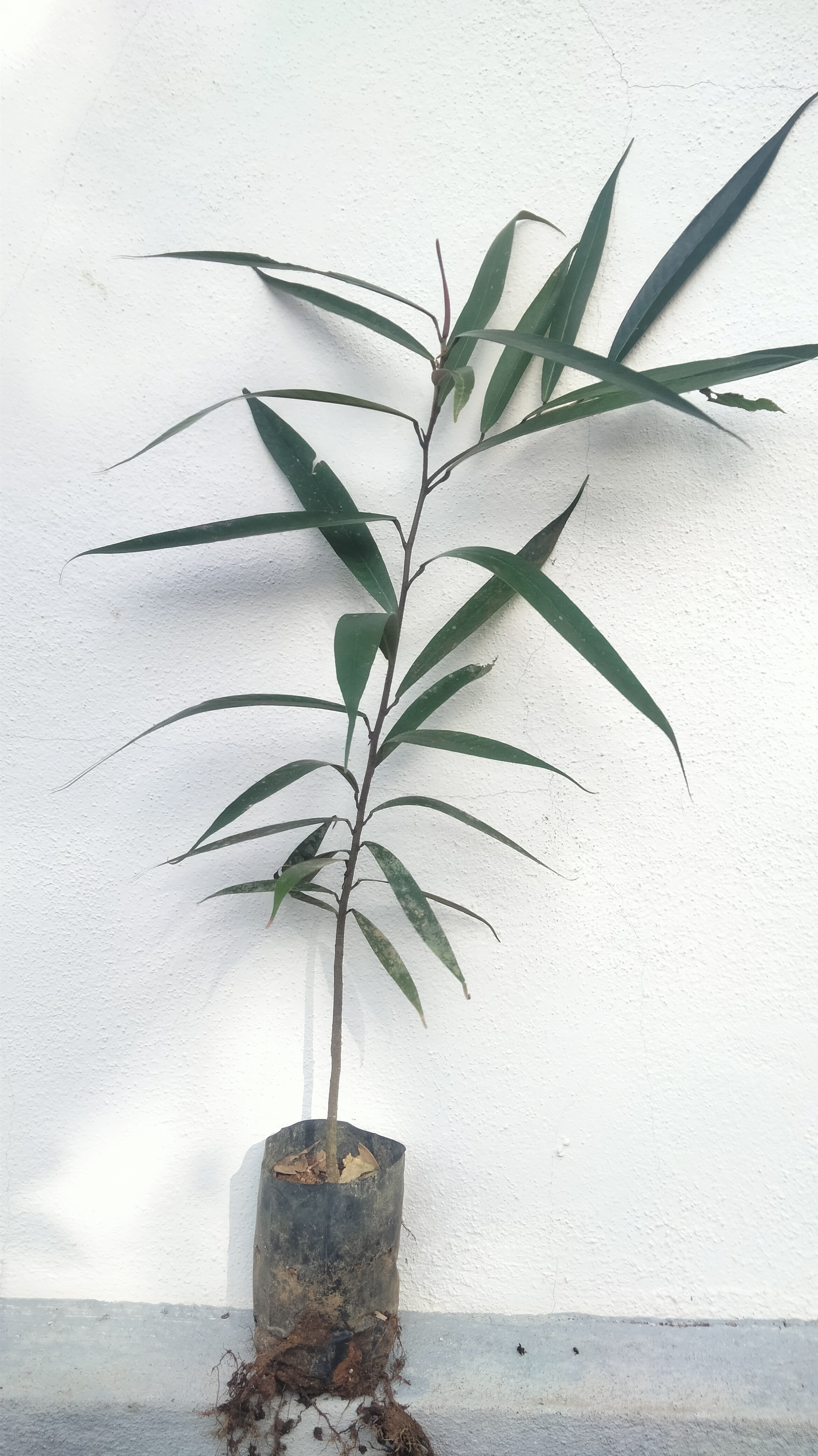
- Sapling

Conservation status
- Least Concern (IUCN 3.1)

Scientific classification
- Kingdom: Plantae
- Clade: Tracheophytes
- Clade: Angiosperms
- Clade: Eudicots
- Clade: Rosids
- Order: Malvales
- Family: Dipterocarpaceae
- Genus: Dipterocarpus
- Species: D. oblongifolius

Binomial name
- Dipterocarpus oblongifolius Blume

Synonyms
- Dipterocarpus pulcherrimus Ridl.; Dipterocarpus stenopterus Vesque

= Dipterocarpus oblongifolius =

Species of tree

Dipterocarpus oblongifolius is a species of tree in the family Dipterocarpaceae. The specific epithet oblongifolius is from the Latin meaning 'oblong leaves'.

== Description ==
Dipterocarpus oblongifolius grows up to 30 m (100 ft) tall, with a trunk diameter of up to 1.5 m (5 ft). The bark is greyish brown. The fruits are ovoid to spindle-shaped, up to 3 cm (1.2 in) long.

== Distribution and habitat ==
Dipterocarpus oblongifolius is native to Thailand, Peninsular Malaysia and Borneo. Its habitat is on river banks to 400 m (1,300 ft) elevation.

== Conservation ==
Dipterocarpus oblongifolius has been assessed as least concern on the IUCN Red List. It is threatened by conversion of its habitat for agriculture through logging. The species is present in a number of protected areas in Borneo including Gunung Mulu National Park, Batang Ai National Park, Lanjak Entimau Wildlife Sanctuary and Gunung Lumaku Forest Reserve.
