= Gelonaetha hirta =

Scientific classification
- Kingdom: Animalia
- Phylum: Arthropoda
- Clade: Pancrustacea
- Class: Insecta
- Order: Coleoptera
- Suborder: Polyphaga
- Infraorder: Cucujiformia
- Family: Cerambycidae
- Genus: Gelonaetha
- Species: G. hirta

Binomial name
- Gelonaetha hirta (Fairmaire, 1850)

Synonyms
- Stromatium hirtum Fairmaire, 1850; Gelonaetha curtipes Thomson, 1878; Astrimus obscurus Sharp, 1878

Species of beetle

Gelonaetha hirta, commonly known as the hibiscus long-horned beetle, or long horn teak borer, is a species of longhorn beetle. It is distributed in Sri Lanka, India, Myanmar, Thailand, Laos, Hainan Island, Taiwan, Borneo, Philippines, Micronesia, Polynesia and West Indies.

== Biology ==
Adult is reddish brown to dark brown in colour. There is tinge of greyish depressed pubescence with tawny setae. Head densely punctate and prothorax densely rugulose to punctate. Elytra densely punctate where each elytron with one or two raised longitudinal lines. Abdomen very sparsely punctate. Adult is about 9 to 16 mm (0.35 to 0.63 in) in length.

Host plants of the larva include: Hibiscus tiliaceus, Anogeissus latifolia, Berrya cordifolia, Dipterocarpus, Grewia, Heritiera fomes, Tectona grandis, and Shorea laevis.
