= Dipterocarpus fagineus =

Conservation status
- Vulnerable (IUCN 3.1)

Scientific classification
- Kingdom: Plantae
- Clade: Tracheophytes
- Clade: Angiosperms
- Clade: Eudicots
- Clade: Rosids
- Order: Malvales
- Family: Dipterocarpaceae
- Genus: Dipterocarpus
- Species: D. fagineus

Binomial name
- Dipterocarpus fagineus Vesque

Species of flowering plant

Dipterocarpus fagineus grows as a medium-sized tree up to 45 m (150 ft) tall, with a trunk diameter of up to 1 m (3 ft). The bark is greyish brown. The fruits are roundish to ellipsoid, up to 1 cm (0.4 in) long. The specific epithet fagineus is from the Latin meaning 'like a beech'. Its habitat is mixed dipterocarp forest on hills. Dipterocarpus fagineus is native to Sumatra, Peninsular Malaysia and Borneo.
