= Dipterocarpus rotundifolius =

Conservation status
- Endangered (IUCN 3.1)

Scientific classification
- Kingdom: Plantae
- Clade: Tracheophytes
- Clade: Angiosperms
- Clade: Eudicots
- Clade: Rosids
- Order: Malvales
- Family: Dipterocarpaceae
- Genus: Dipterocarpus
- Species: D. rotundifolius

Binomial name
- Dipterocarpus rotundifolius Foxw.

Species of flowering plant

Dipterocarpus rotundifolius is a species of flowering plant in the family Dipterocarpaceae. It is a tree native to Peninsular Malaysia. It is native to coastal hill dipterocarp rain forest in Johor, Pahang and Perak states.

The species was first described by Frederick William Foxworthy in 1932.
