= Dipterocarpus conformis =

Scientific classification
- Kingdom: Plantae
- Clade: Tracheophytes
- Clade: Angiosperms
- Clade: Eudicots
- Clade: Rosids
- Order: Malvales
- Family: Dipterocarpaceae
- Genus: Dipterocarpus
- Species: D. conformis

Binomial name
- Dipterocarpus conformis Slooten

Subspecies
- Dipterocarpus conformis subsp. borneensis P.S.Ashton; Dipterocarpus conformis subsp. conformis

Species of tree

Dipterocarpus conformis is a species of plant in the family Dipterocarpaceae. The species is named derived from Latin (conformis = of a similar form) and alludes to the great similarity in vegetative characters with two other large-leaved Dipterocarpus species (D. concavus and D. confertus). There are two subspecies; D. conformis subsp. conformis which is confined to Aceh and North Sumatra and D. conformis subsp. borneensis which is confined to Borneo. D. conformis subsp. borneensis is an emergent tree, up to 50 m tall, in mixed dipterocarp forest on clay soils over shale. It is a medium hardwood sold under the trade names of Keruing.

The species was described by Dirk Fok van Slooten in 1941.
