= Dipterocarpus kunstleri =

Conservation status
- Least Concern (IUCN 3.1)

Scientific classification
- Kingdom: Plantae
- Clade: Tracheophytes
- Clade: Angiosperms
- Clade: Eudicots
- Clade: Rosids
- Order: Malvales
- Family: Dipterocarpaceae
- Genus: Dipterocarpus
- Species: D. kunstleri

Binomial name
- Dipterocarpus kunstleri King

Synonyms
- Dipterocarpus exalatus Slooten; Dipterocarpus speciosus Brandis

Species of tree

Dipterocarpus kunstleri is a species of tree in the family Dipterocarpaceae, native to Southeast Asia.

== Description ==
Dipterocarpus kunstleri grows as a canopy tree up to 40 m (130 ft) tall, with a trunk diameter of up to 1 m (3 ft). The bark is orange-brown. The fruit is ellipsoid, measuring up to 5 cm (2 in) long.

== Taxonomy ==
Dipterocarpus kunstleri was described in 1893 by the British botanist George King. The type specimen was collected in Perak, Malaysia. The species is named for the plant collector H. H. Kunstler, who collected for King.

== Distribution and habitat ==
Dipterocarpus kunstleri is native to Sumatra, Peninsular Malaysia, Singapore, Borneo and the Philippines. Its habitat is primary forests, sometimes near rivers or on hills, up to 700 m (2,300 ft) elevation.

== Conservation ==
As of 2023, Dipterocarpus kunstleri has been assessed as least concern on the IUCN Red List. The status is due to the broad distribution and abundance of the species. Additionally, the species is present in numerous protected areas. In Borneo, these include Batang Ai National Park, Gunung Gading National Park, Lambir Hills National Park and Danum Valley Conservation Area.

Threats to the species include logging in Peninsular Malaysia and Borneo, conversion of land for agriculture and plantations in Borneo and a very small genetically vulnerable population in Singapore. In 1998, the species was assessed as critically endangered.
