= Dipterocarpus sublamellatus =

Conservation status
- Endangered (IUCN 3.1)

Scientific classification
- Kingdom: Plantae
- Clade: Tracheophytes
- Clade: Angiosperms
- Clade: Eudicots
- Clade: Rosids
- Order: Malvales
- Family: Dipterocarpaceae
- Genus: Dipterocarpus
- Species: D. sublamellatus

Binomial name
- Dipterocarpus sublamellatus Foxw.

Species of tree

Dipterocarpus sublamellatus grows as a large tree up to 70 m (230 ft) tall, with a trunk diameter of up to 3 m (10 ft). Bark is orange-brown. The fruits are round, up to 3 cm (1.2 in) in diameter. It is found in a variety of now vulnerable habitats from sea level to 400 m (1,300 ft) elevation. Dipterocarpus sublamellatus is native to Sumatra, Peninsular Malaysia and Borneo.
