= Dipterocarpus stellatus =

Conservation status
- Vulnerable (IUCN 3.1)

Scientific classification
- Kingdom: Plantae
- Clade: Embryophytes
- Clade: Tracheophytes
- Clade: Angiosperms
- Clade: Eudicots
- Clade: Rosids
- Order: Malvales
- Family: Dipterocarpaceae
- Genus: Dipterocarpus
- Species: D. stellatus

Binomial name
- Dipterocarpus stellatus Vesque

Synonyms
- Dipterocarpus nobilis Dyer

Species of tree

Dipterocarpus stellatus is a tree in the family Dipterocarpaceae. The specific epithet stellatus means 'star-like', referring to its trichomes.

== Description ==
Dipterocarpus stellatus grows as a tree up to 65 metres (200 ft) tall, with a trunk diameter of up to 1 m (3 ft). The bark is pinkish brown. Its fruits are spiraled, up to 5 cm (2 in) long.

== Distribution and habitat ==
Dipterocarpus stellatus is endemic to Borneo. Its habitat is mixed dipterocarp forest to 800 m (2,600 ft) elevation.

== Conservation ==
Dipterocarpus stellatus has been assessed as vulnerable on the IUCN Red List. The species is threatened by land conversion to plantations for agriculture and by logging roads. Mining is considered a threat to the species in Kalimantan.
