= Dipterocarpus orbicularis =

Conservation status
- Endangered (IUCN 3.1)

Scientific classification
- Kingdom: Plantae
- Clade: Tracheophytes
- Clade: Angiosperms
- Clade: Eudicots
- Clade: Rosids
- Order: Malvales
- Family: Dipterocarpaceae
- Genus: Dipterocarpus
- Species: D. orbicularis

Binomial name
- Dipterocarpus orbicularis Foxw.

Species of flowering plant

Dipterocarpus orbicularis is a species of flowering plant in the family Dipterocarpaceae. It is a tree endemic to the island of Luzon in the Philippines, where it grows in lowland and mid-elevation rain forest.

The species was first described by Frederick William Foxworthy in 1918.
