= Heart of Borneo =

Inter-governmental conservation agreement

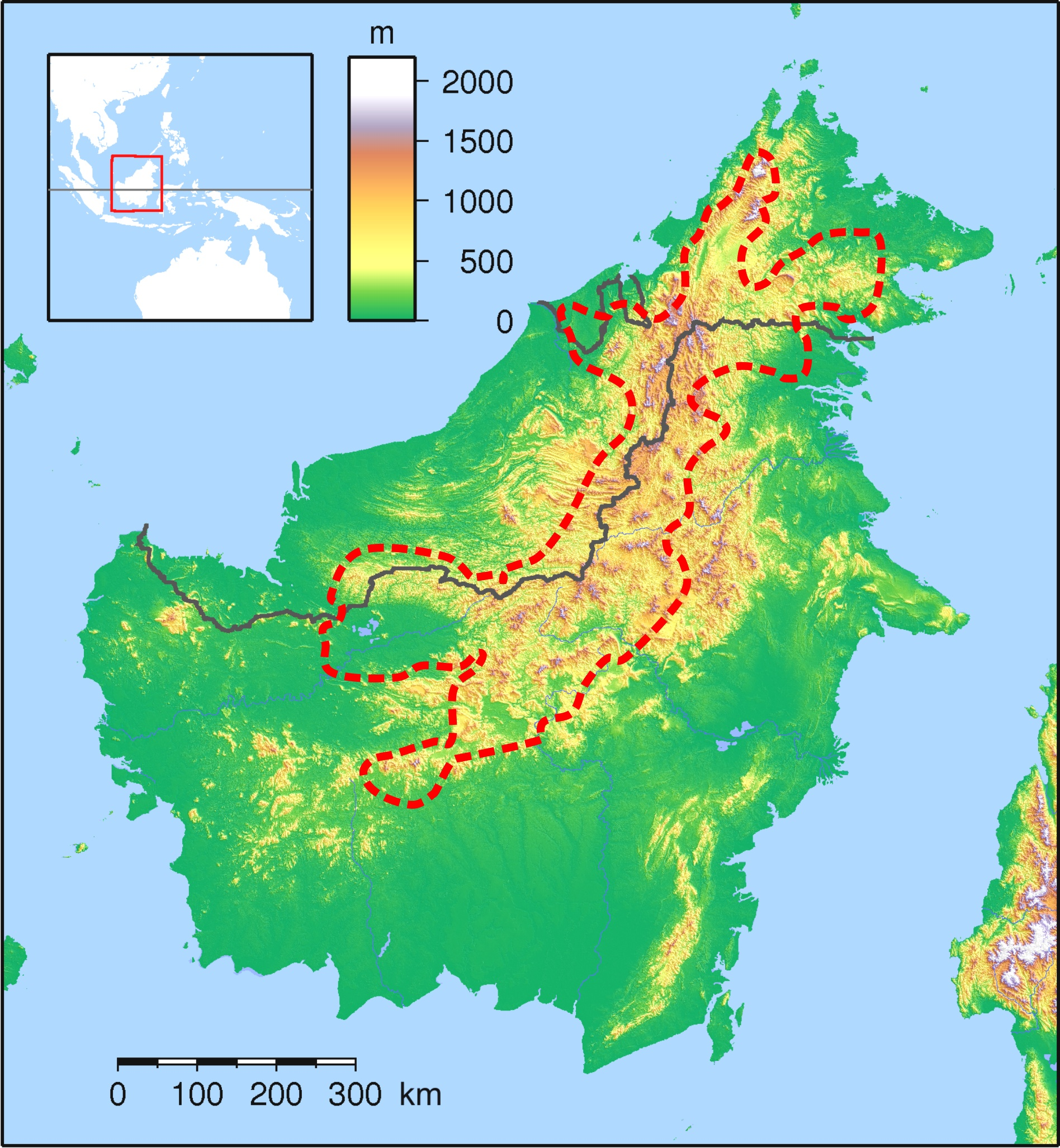
Map of the proposed Heart of Borneo area

The Heart of Borneo is a conservation agreement initiated by the World Wide Fund for Nature to protect a 220,000 km² forested region on Borneo island. The agreement was signed by the governments of Brunei, Indonesia and Malaysia in Bali on 12 February 2007 to support the initiative. The region provides habitat to 10 endemic species of primates, more than 350 birds, 150 reptiles and amphibians and 10,000 plants. From 2007 to 2010 a total of 123 new species have been recorded in the region. A status report from 2012 found that the lowland rain forest within the area is deteriorating and under threat. The Bornean rhinoceros was the most threatened fauna, in 2015 three captive individuals remained in Sabah.

== Protected areas ==
The proposed Heart of Borneo region includes a number of areas already under protection, such as: Batang Ai National Park, Lanjak Entimau Wildlife Sanctuary, Gunung Mulu National Park, Crocker Range National Park, Kinabalu National Park in Malaysia, the Kayan Mentarang National Park, Betung Kerihun National Park, Bukit Baka Bukit Raya National Park, Danau Sentarum National Park in Indonesia and the Ulu Temburong National Park in Brunei.

== See also ==
- Deforestation in Borneo
- Transboundary protected area
