= Dipterocarpus nudus =

Conservation status
- Least Concern (IUCN 3.1)

Scientific classification
- Kingdom: Plantae
- Clade: Embryophytes
- Clade: Tracheophytes
- Clade: Angiosperms
- Clade: Eudicots
- Clade: Rosids
- Order: Malvales
- Family: Dipterocarpaceae
- Genus: Dipterocarpus
- Species: D. nudus

Binomial name
- Dipterocarpus nudus Vesque

Synonyms
- Dipterocarpus pentapterus Dyer

Species of tree

Dipterocarpus nudus is a tree in the family Dipterocarpaceae.

== Description ==
Dipterocarpus nudus grows as a large tree up to 50 metres (160 ft) tall, with a trunk diameter of up to 1.3 m (4 ft). The crown is dark and dense. The fruit is ellipsoid, up to 2.5 cm (1 in) long.

== Distribution and habitat ==
Dipterocarpus nudus is endemic to Borneo. It is found in a variety of habitats, up to 600 metres (2,000 ft) elevation.
