= Dipterocarpus palembanicus =

Conservation status
- Vulnerable (IUCN 3.1)

Scientific classification
- Kingdom: Plantae
- Clade: Tracheophytes
- Clade: Angiosperms
- Clade: Eudicots
- Clade: Rosids
- Order: Malvales
- Family: Dipterocarpaceae
- Genus: Dipterocarpus
- Species: D. palembanicus

Binomial name
- Dipterocarpus palembanicus Slooten

Subspecies
- Dipterocarpus palembanicus subsp. borneensis P.S.Ashton; Dipterocarpus palembanicus subsp. palembanicus

Species of tree

Dipterocarpus palembanicus is a species of tree in the family Dipterocarpaceae. There are two subspecies: borneensis and palembanicus.

It is found in Borneo, Malaya, and Sumatera.
