= Dipterocarpus littoralis =

Conservation status
- Critically Endangered (IUCN 3.1)

Scientific classification
- Kingdom: Plantae
- Clade: Tracheophytes
- Clade: Angiosperms
- Clade: Eudicots
- Clade: Rosids
- Order: Malvales
- Family: Dipterocarpaceae
- Genus: Dipterocarpus
- Species: D. littoralis

Binomial name
- Dipterocarpus littoralis Blume

Species of flowering plant

Dipterocarpus littoralis is a species of flowering plant in the family Dipterocarpaceae. It is a tree endemic to western Nusa Kambangan off the southern coast of Java. It is a large tree native to lowland rain forest up to 500 meters elevation, where it grows near streams and on hills on both alluvial soil and limestone substrate. The species is threatened by overharvesting for timber and habitat loss from forest clearance for agriculture. The species has an estimated population of fewer than 50 mature individuals, and the IUCN Red List assesses the species as critically endangered.

The species was first described by Carl Ludwig Blume in 1825.
