= Dipterocarpus glandulosus =

Scientific classification
- Kingdom: Plantae
- Clade: Tracheophytes
- Clade: Angiosperms
- Clade: Eudicots
- Clade: Rosids
- Order: Malvales
- Family: Dipterocarpaceae
- Genus: Dipterocarpus
- Species: D. glandulosus

Binomial name
- Dipterocarpus glandulosus Thwaites

Synonyms
- Dipterocarpus scabridus Thwaites

Species of flowering plant

Dipterocarpus glandulosus (Sinhalese: Dorana) is a species of flowering plant in the family Dipterocarpaceae. It is an emergent tree endemic to southwestern Sri Lanka where grows in scattered populations in lowland evergreen rain forest. It is threatened by habitat loss from expansion of agriculture and by excessive tapping of resin for the traditional painting industry.

The species was first described in 1858 by George Henry Kendrick Thwaites.
