= Dipterocarpus scaber =

Conservation status
- Data Deficient (IUCN 3.1)

Scientific classification
- Kingdom: Plantae
- Clade: Tracheophytes
- Clade: Angiosperms
- Clade: Eudicots
- Clade: Rosids
- Order: Malvales
- Family: Dipterocarpaceae
- Genus: Dipterocarpus
- Species: D. scaber

Binomial name
- Dipterocarpus scaber Buch.-Ham.

Synonyms
- Dipterocarpus alatus A.DC.

Species of flowering plant

Dipterocarpus scaber (Bengali: Keshogarjan) is a species of flowering plant in the family Dipterocarpaceae. It is a tree native to Bangladesh and the Indian state of Tripura.

The species was first described by Francis Buchanan-Hamilton in 1826.
