= Dipterocarpus perakensis =

Conservation status
- Endangered (IUCN 3.1)

Scientific classification
- Kingdom: Plantae
- Clade: Tracheophytes
- Clade: Angiosperms
- Clade: Eudicots
- Clade: Rosids
- Order: Malvales
- Family: Dipterocarpaceae
- Genus: Dipterocarpus
- Species: D. perakensis

Binomial name
- Dipterocarpus perakensis P.S.Ashton

Species of flowering plant

Dipterocarpus perakensis is a species of flowering plant in the family Dipterocarpaceae. It is a tree endemic to Peninsular Malaysia. It is native to coastal hill dipterocarp forest in Penang and Perak states.
