= Dipterocarpus mundus =

Conservation status
- Vulnerable (IUCN 3.1)

Scientific classification
- Kingdom: Plantae
- Clade: Tracheophytes
- Clade: Angiosperms
- Clade: Eudicots
- Clade: Rosids
- Order: Malvales
- Family: Dipterocarpaceae
- Genus: Dipterocarpus
- Species: D. mundus

Binomial name
- Dipterocarpus mundus Slooten

Species of flowering plant

Dipterocarpus mundus is a species of tree in the family Dipterocarpaceae, endemic to Borneo. The species is found in lowland mixed dipterocarp forests.
