= Dipterocarpus pachyphyllus =

Conservation status
- Vulnerable (IUCN 3.1)

Scientific classification
- Kingdom: Plantae
- Clade: Embryophytes
- Clade: Tracheophytes
- Clade: Angiosperms
- Clade: Eudicots
- Clade: Rosids
- Order: Malvales
- Family: Dipterocarpaceae
- Genus: Dipterocarpus
- Species: D. pachyphyllus

Binomial name
- Dipterocarpus pachyphyllus Meijer

Species of tree

Dipterocarpus pachyphyllus is a tree in the family Dipterocarpaceae. The specific epithet pachyphyllus means 'thick leaves'.

== Description ==
Dipterocarpus pachyphyllus grows as a tree up to 45 metres (150 ft) tall, with a trunk diameter of up to 1.2 m (4 ft). Its bark is chocolate-brown. The fruits are roundish, up to 2.5 cm (1 in) long.

== Distribution and habitat ==
Dipterocarpus pachyphyllus is endemic to Borneo. Its habitat is mixed dipterocarp forests and hilly land to 400 metres (1,300 ft) elevation.

== Conservation ==
Dipterocarpus pachyphyllus has been assessed as vulnerable on the IUCN Red List. The species is threatened by logging and land conversion. In Kalimantan, forest fires are a threat.
