= Dipterocarpus concavus =

Conservation status
- Vulnerable (IUCN 3.1)

Scientific classification
- Kingdom: Plantae
- Clade: Tracheophytes
- Clade: Angiosperms
- Clade: Eudicots
- Clade: Rosids
- Order: Malvales
- Family: Dipterocarpaceae
- Genus: Dipterocarpus
- Species: D. concavus

Binomial name
- Dipterocarpus concavus Foxw.

Species of flowering plant

Dipterocarpus concavus is a species of flowering plant in the family Dipterocarpaceae. It is a tree native to Peninsular Malaysia and Sumatra. It is a large tree with a grey trunk. It is native to lowland mixed dipterocarp rain forest, including hill forest and coastal forest, from 200 to 1,000 metres elevation. In Sumatra it ranges from Lampung Province, including Bukit Barisan Selatan National Park, in the south to Aceh Province in the north, and to the Riau Islands. In Peninsular Malaysia it is native to six states. The species is threatened by habitat loss from deforestation and from timber harvesting, and the IUCN Red List assesses the species as vulnerable.

The species was first described by Frederick William Foxworthy in 1932.
