= Dipterocarpus lowii =

- Seed of Dipterocarpus lowii

Conservation status
- Near Threatened (IUCN 3.1)

Scientific classification
- Kingdom: Plantae
- Clade: Tracheophytes
- Clade: Angiosperms
- Clade: Eudicots
- Clade: Rosids
- Order: Malvales
- Family: Dipterocarpaceae
- Genus: Dipterocarpus
- Species: D. lowii

Binomial name
- Dipterocarpus lowii Hook.f.

Synonyms
- Dipterocarpus undulatus Vesque

Species of tree

Dipterocarpus lowii is a tree in the family Dipterocarpaceae.

== Description ==
Dipterocarpus lowii grows as a large tree up to 55 metres (180 ft) tall, with a trunk diameter of up to 2 metres (7 ft). The bark is chocolate-brown. The fruits are roundish, up to 4 cm (2 in) long.

== Distribution and habitat ==
Dipterocarpus lowii is native to Sumatra, Peninsular Malaysia and Borneo. Its habitat is mixed dipterocarp forest, also on rocks, from sea level to 400 metres (1,300 ft) elevation.

== Conservation ==
Dipterocarpus lowii has been assessed as near threatened on the IUCN Red List. The species is threatened by logging and conversion of land for palm oil plantations and pulp wood. Subpopulations in Kalimantan and Sumatra are threatened by fires.
