= Dipterocarpus cuspidatus =

Conservation status
- Critically Endangered (IUCN 3.1)

Scientific classification
- Kingdom: Plantae
- Clade: Tracheophytes
- Clade: Angiosperms
- Clade: Eudicots
- Clade: Rosids
- Order: Malvales
- Family: Dipterocarpaceae
- Genus: Dipterocarpus
- Species: D. cuspidatus

Binomial name
- Dipterocarpus cuspidatus P.S.Ashton

Species of tree

Dipterocarpus cuspidatus is a tree in the family Dipterocarpaceae.

== Description ==
Dipterocarpus cuspidatus grows as a medium-sized tree up to 50 metres (160 ft) tall, with a trunk diameter of up to 1.2 metres (4 ft). The bark is rust-brown. The fruits are roundish, up to 2 cm (1 in) long.

== Distribution and habitat ==
Dipterocarpus cuspidatus is endemic to Borneo, where it is recorded from only three sites in Sarawak. Its habitat is mixed dipterocarp rain forest on low hills up to 300 metres (1,000 ft) elevation.

== Conservation ==
Dipterocarpus cuspidatus has been assessed as Critically endangered on the IUCN Red List. The species is threatened by logging for timber and by the conversion of land for palm oil plantations.
