= Dipterocarpus geniculatus =

Conservation status
- Endangered (IUCN 3.1)

Scientific classification
- Kingdom: Plantae
- Clade: Tracheophytes
- Clade: Angiosperms
- Clade: Eudicots
- Clade: Rosids
- Order: Malvales
- Family: Dipterocarpaceae
- Genus: Dipterocarpus
- Species: D. geniculatus

Binomial name
- Dipterocarpus geniculatus Vesque

Subspecies
- Dipterocarpus geniculatus subsp. geniculatus; Dipterocarpus geniculatus subsp. grandis P.S.Ashton

Synonyms
- Synonyms of subsp. geniculatus: Dipterocarpus angulatus Dyer

Species of tree

Dipterocarpus geniculatus is a species of plant in the family Dipterocarpaceae. The species name is derived from Latin (geniculatus = with bent knee) and refers to the shape of the petiole. There are two subspecies; D. geniculatus subsp. geniculatus and D. geniculatus subsp. grandis both of which are endemic to Borneo. Both subspecies are emergent trees, up to 60 m tall, in lowland mixed dipterocarp rain forest up to 400 meters elevation. D. geniculatus subsp. geniculatus is found on leached sandy and sandy/silty clay soils and occurs in at least one protected area (Bako National Park). D. geniculatus subsp. grandis occurs on similar soils as well as those over ultrabasic rock and occurs in at least one protected area (Lambir Hills National Park).
