= Dipterocarpus pseudocornutus =

Conservation status
- Critically Endangered (IUCN 3.1)

Scientific classification
- Kingdom: Plantae
- Clade: Tracheophytes
- Clade: Angiosperms
- Clade: Eudicots
- Clade: Rosids
- Order: Malvales
- Family: Dipterocarpaceae
- Genus: Dipterocarpus
- Species: D. pseudocornutus

Binomial name
- Dipterocarpus pseudocornutus P.S.Ashton

Species of flowering plant

Dipterocarpus pseudocornutus is a species of flowering plant in the family Dipterocarpaceae. It is a tree endemic to the Philippines. It is known from a single collection in Languyan, Tawi-Tawi, in degraded forest.

The species was first described by Peter Shaw Ashton in 2015.
