= Dipterocarpus verrucosus =

Conservation status
- Near Threatened (IUCN 3.1)

Scientific classification
- Kingdom: Plantae
- Clade: Tracheophytes
- Clade: Angiosperms
- Clade: Eudicots
- Clade: Rosids
- Order: Malvales
- Family: Dipterocarpaceae
- Genus: Dipterocarpus
- Species: D. verrucosus

Binomial name
- Dipterocarpus verrucosus Foxw. ex Slooten

Species of flowering plant

Dipterocarpus verrucosus is a species of tree in the family Dipterocarpaceae. It is native to Borneo, Peninsular Malaysia and Thailand. The species locally common on ridges in lowland mixed dipterocarp forest. Its keruing timber is exploited by logging, particularly in Borneo.
