= Dipterocarpus globosus =

Conservation status
- Least Concern (IUCN 3.1)

Scientific classification
- Kingdom: Plantae
- Clade: Tracheophytes
- Clade: Angiosperms
- Clade: Eudicots
- Clade: Rosids
- Order: Malvales
- Family: Dipterocarpaceae
- Genus: Dipterocarpus
- Species: D. globosus

Binomial name
- Dipterocarpus globosus Vesque

Species of tree

Dipterocarpus globosus is a species of tree in the family Dipterocarpaceae endemic to Borneo, where it occurs in Brunei, Sarawak (Malaysia) and Kalimantan (Indonesia).

== Range and habitat ==
Dipterocarpus globusus grows in lowland mixed dipterocarp forest and heath forest up to 500 meters elevation, where it is locally abundant.
