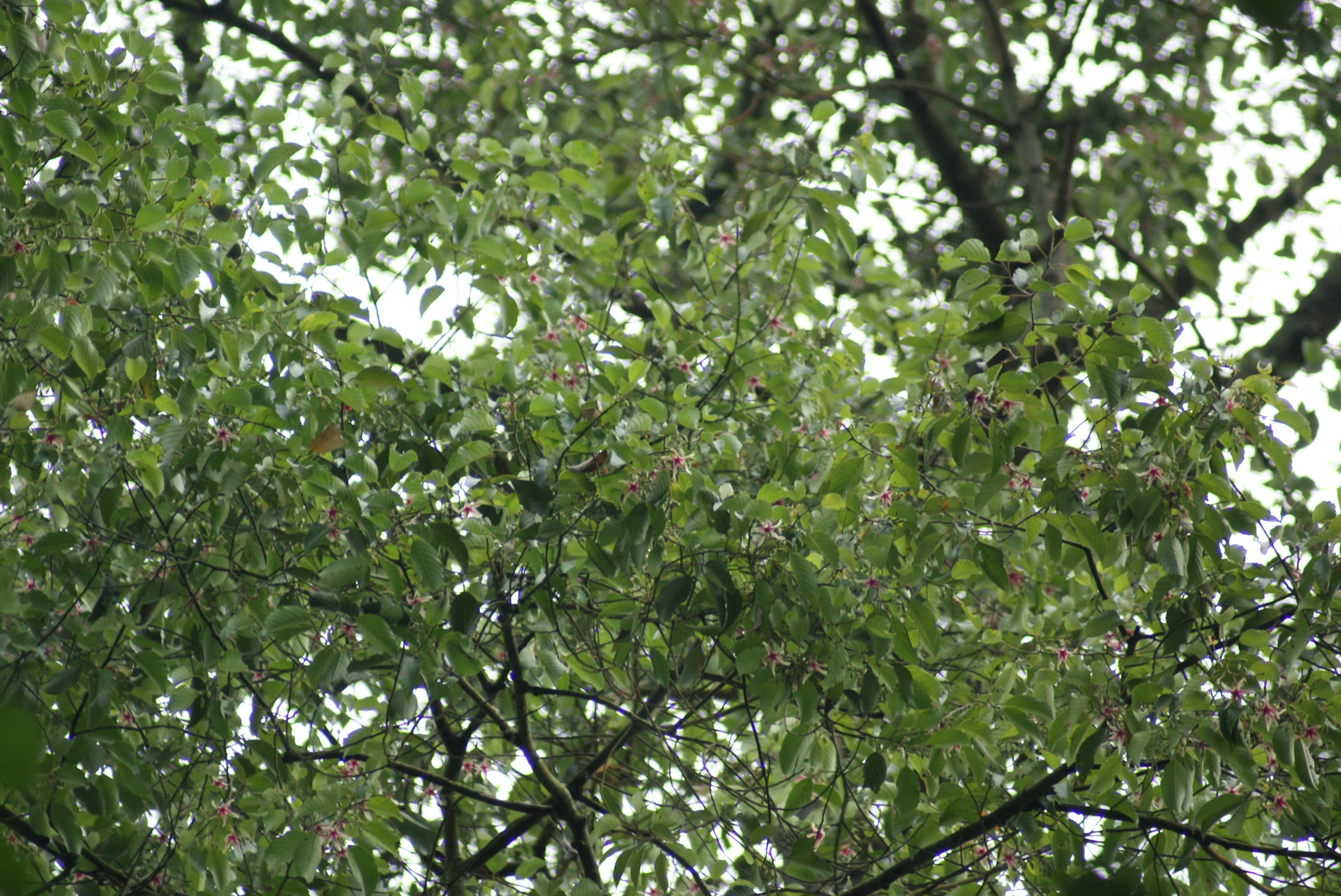

Conservation status
- Least Concern (IUCN 3.1)

Scientific classification
- Kingdom: Plantae
- Clade: Tracheophytes
- Clade: Angiosperms
- Clade: Eudicots
- Clade: Rosids
- Order: Malvales
- Family: Dipterocarpaceae
- Genus: Dipterocarpus
- Species: D. condorensis

Binomial name
- Dipterocarpus condorensis Pierre

Subspecies
- D. c. subsp. condorensis; D. c. subsp. penangianus (Foxw.) P.S.Ashton

= Dipterocarpus condorensis =

Species of tree

Dipterocarpus condorensis is a species of plant in the evergreen or semi-evergreen family Dipterocarpaceae.

It is an emergent tree, up to 50 m tall, in mixed dipterocarp forest on dry ridges. It is found in Sumatra, coastal Peninsular Malaysia, Singapore, and Borneo, the Philippines, and Vietnam. It is a medium hardwood sold under the trade names of Keruing. It was formerly most abundant along the coastal hills on sandy soils, but is endangered due to land conversion. D. condoriensis is found in at least one protected area (Sepilok Forest Reserve).

== Subspecies ==
There are two accepted subspecies:

- Dipterocarpus condorensis subsp. condorensis (synonym Dipterocarpus caudatus Foxw.) – Vietnam (Con Dao) and Philippines (Luzon and Mindanao)
- Dipterocarpus condorensis subsp. penangianus (Foxw.) P.S.Ashton & Luu (synonyms Dipterocarpus caudatus subsp. penangianus (Foxw.) P.S.Ashton and Dipterocarpus penangianus Foxw.) – Peninsular Malaysia, Sumatra, and Borneo

The synonymous species name caudatus is derived from Latin (caudatus = tailed) and refers to the narrow acumen of the leaf apex.
