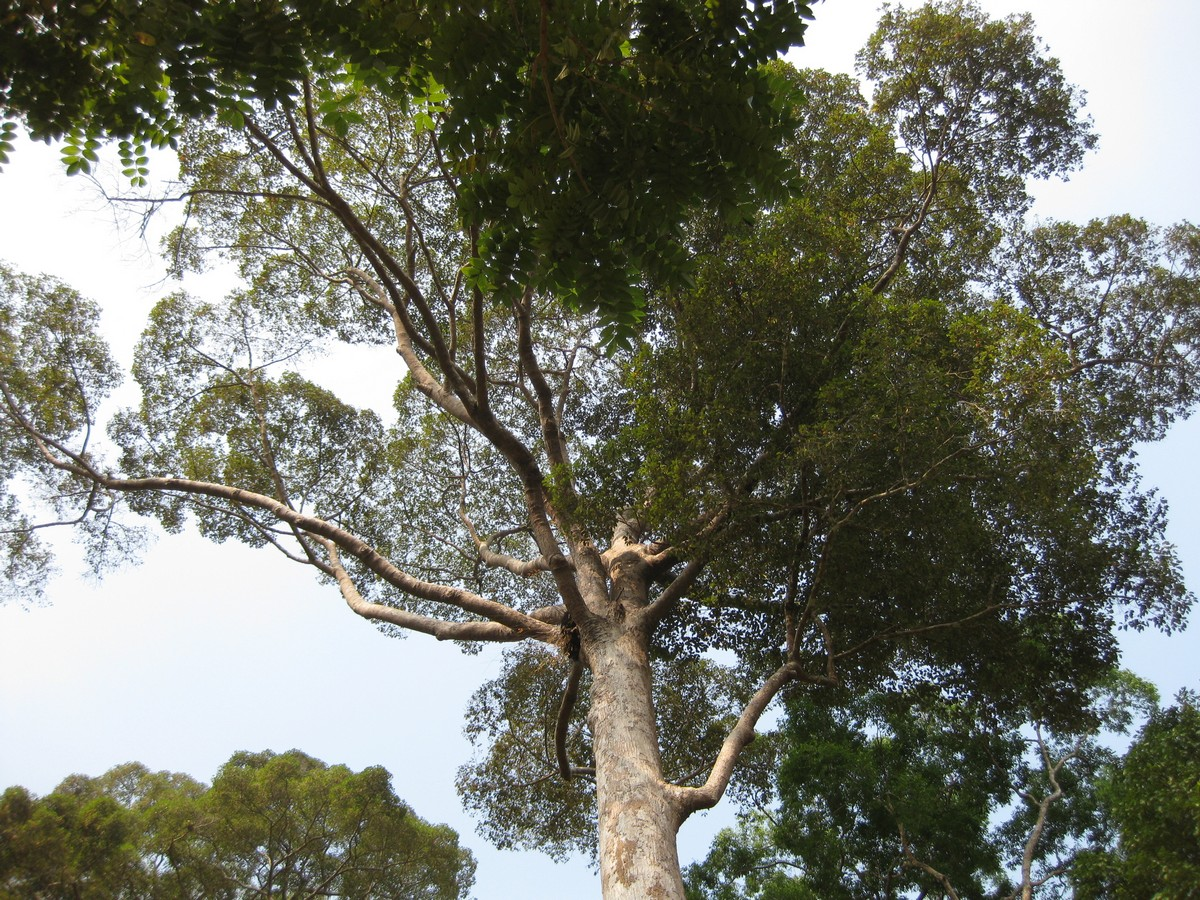

Conservation status
- Vulnerable (IUCN 3.1)

Scientific classification
- Kingdom: Plantae
- Clade: Tracheophytes
- Clade: Angiosperms
- Clade: Eudicots
- Clade: Rosids
- Order: Malvales
- Family: Dipterocarpaceae
- Genus: Dipterocarpus
- Species: D. costatus

Binomial name
- Dipterocarpus costatus G.Don

= Dipterocarpus costatus =

Species of tree

Dipterocarpus costatus (Khmer chhë tiël niëng, chhë tiël bangkuëy, niëng daèng krâhâm) is a species of tree in the family Dipterocarpaceae found in the Indochinese and Malay Peninsulas, including Cambodia. The tree is found in "mixed dense deciduous or half-deciduous forest of the plain and in wet dense altitude forest, up to 1200 m, on well drained rich grounds." It grows to a height of 25-40m. In Cambodia the resin is used particularly for the caulking of boats, and the preparation of torches, the wood used for work not exposed to the elements.
