= Dipterocarpus fusiformis =

Conservation status
- Endangered (IUCN 3.1)

Scientific classification
- Kingdom: Plantae
- Clade: Tracheophytes
- Clade: Angiosperms
- Clade: Eudicots
- Clade: Rosids
- Order: Malvales
- Family: Dipterocarpaceae
- Genus: Dipterocarpus
- Species: D. fusiformis

Binomial name
- Dipterocarpus fusiformis P.S.Ashton

Species of tree

Dipterocarpus fusiformis is a species of tree in the family Dipterocarpaceae. The tree is endemic to Borneo, where it is found in Central and East Kalimantan provinces of Indonesia and Sabah state of Malaysia.

== Habitat and conservation ==
It is found on well-drained fertile soils in mixed dipterocarp forests. The largest concentrations of the trees are generally on ridge tops. It has a wide geographic range, with an estimated extent of occurrence (EOO) of 127,755 km^{2}, but it is found only in a few sites, and has an estimated area of occupancy (AOO) of only 20 km^{2}.

The species is threatened with habitat loss, and its remaining habitat is increasingly fragmented. Its range and population are declining, and of the nine collection localities, only five are thought to still support populations of trees. Its conservation status is assessed as endangered.
