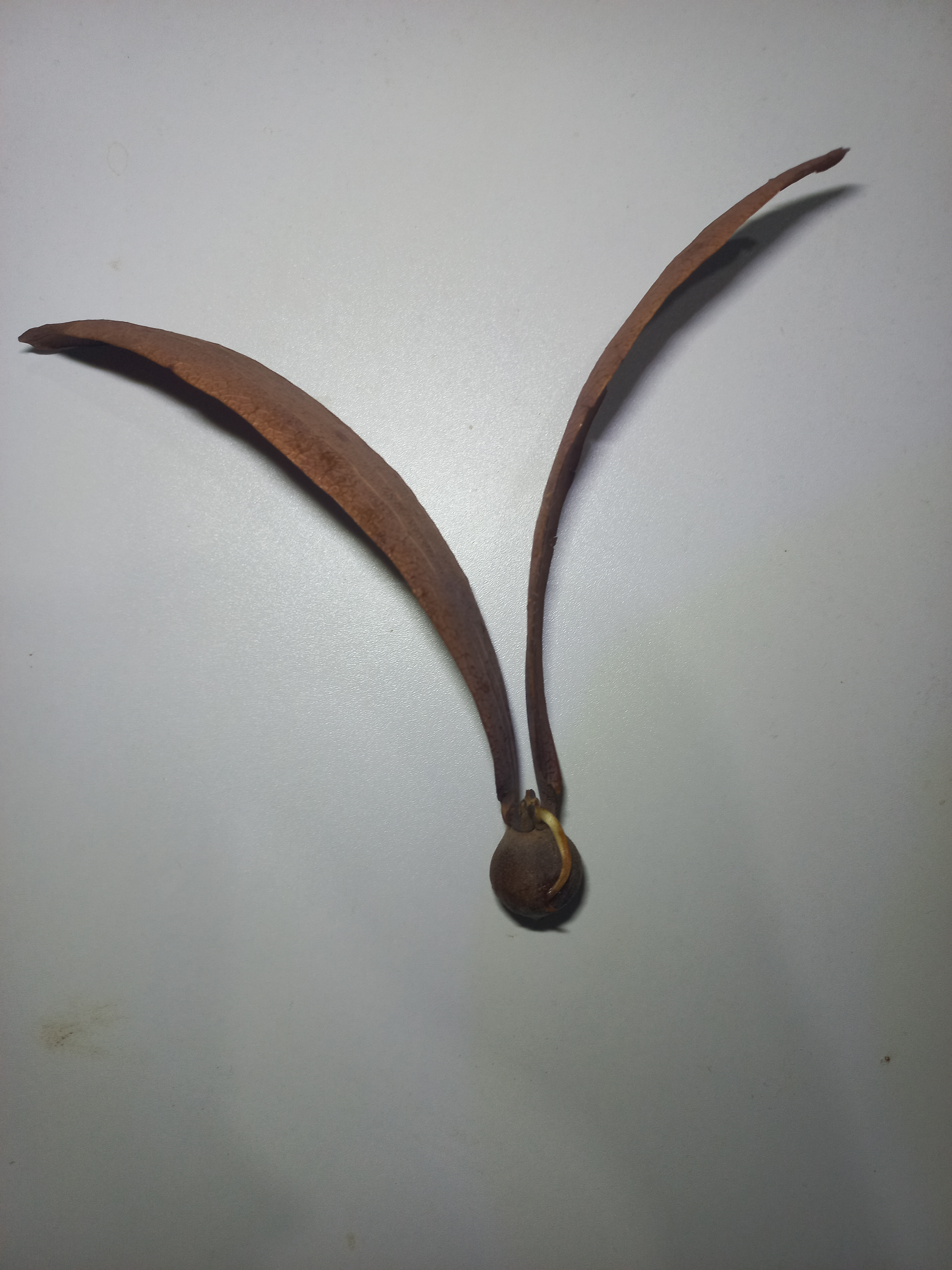
- A seed of Dipterocarpus chartaceus

Conservation status
- Endangered (IUCN 3.1)

Scientific classification
- Kingdom: Plantae
- Clade: Tracheophytes
- Clade: Angiosperms
- Clade: Eudicots
- Clade: Rosids
- Order: Malvales
- Family: Dipterocarpaceae
- Genus: Dipterocarpus
- Species: D. chartaceus

Binomial name
- Dipterocarpus chartaceus Symington

Synonyms
- Dipterocarpus skinneri var. hirtus Ridl.

= Dipterocarpus chartaceus =

Species of flowering plant

Dipterocarpus chartaceus (Malay Keruing kertas, Thai Yaang Waat, Yang Paiis) a species of flowering plant in the family Dipterocarpaceae. It is a tree native to Peninsular Malaysia and Peninsular Thailand. It is native to lowland dipterocarp rain forests and beach forests up to 100 metres elevation, where grows up to 35 metres tall.
