= Vesque Sisters =

French artists

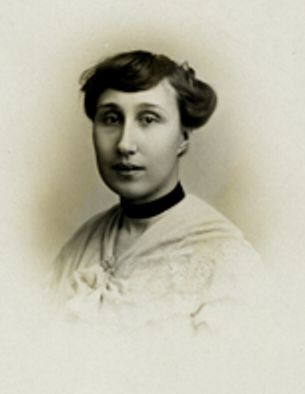
Marthe Vesque

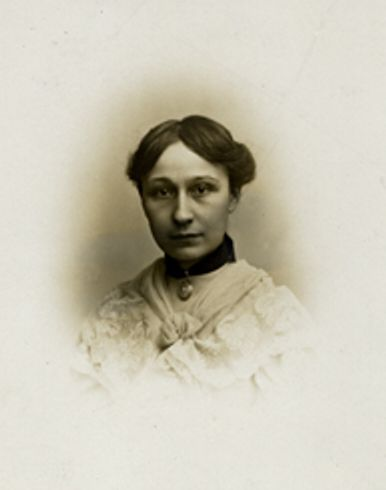
Juliette Vesque

The Vesque Sisters were two French artist sisters, Marthe (1879 in Joinville-le-Pont – 4 February 1949) and Juliette (1881 in Paris – 4 December 1962), who, between 1900 and 1949, frequented Parisian circuses and documented circus life and performances in well-executed paintings. The sisters attended weekly shows where the performers were sketched live at both circus and variety theaters. Their records constitute a unique documentation of European circus in the first half of the twentieth century. Their extensive journal entries from 1904 to 1947 added fascinating information and insights, written in a vigorous style and teeming with gossip about the circus community, with a marvellous eye for detail.

In the French circus world the pair were known as "les demoiselles Vesque" or "les sœurs Vesque". Marthe and Juliette Vesque were inseparable throughout their lives, remained spinsters, and shared occupations and interests. Their father, Julien Joseph Vesque (1848-1895), was a noted botanist. He acted as Maître de Conférence at the Institut Agronomique in Paris and had numerous publications to his name. As did botanists of the period, Julien Vesque created detailed drawings of his botanical work. These artistic skills he taught to his daughters, training them to produce accurate renditions through keen observation.

The sisters' love for the circus started at an early age, and as Paris was a circus hotspot in the early 1900s the sisters were provided with ample opportunity to indulge their passion. Performing at that time were the Cirque d’Hiver and Cirque Medrano, as well as the Nouveau Cirque, the Cirque Métropole (later Cirque de Paris), the Hippodrome de la Place Clichy and the Empire Music-Hall Cirque.

Marthe and Juliette were drawn together by the premature death of their father in 1895, when they were only sixteen and fourteen years old. Both became professional artists, and for 24 years hand-painted floral decorations on china at the Manufacture nationale de Sèvres, the leading French manufacturer. They left when its style became too modern for their taste and found work at the Muséum national d'Histoire naturelle, depicting natural history specimens, especially those that were entomological. Their illustrations were also used in botany books, a number of their plates being included in the Larousse Encyclopedia. Their work was often signed jointly as 'M.J.V.' or 'M.J. Vesque' as seen in their illustrations for "Flore de Madagascar et des Comores".

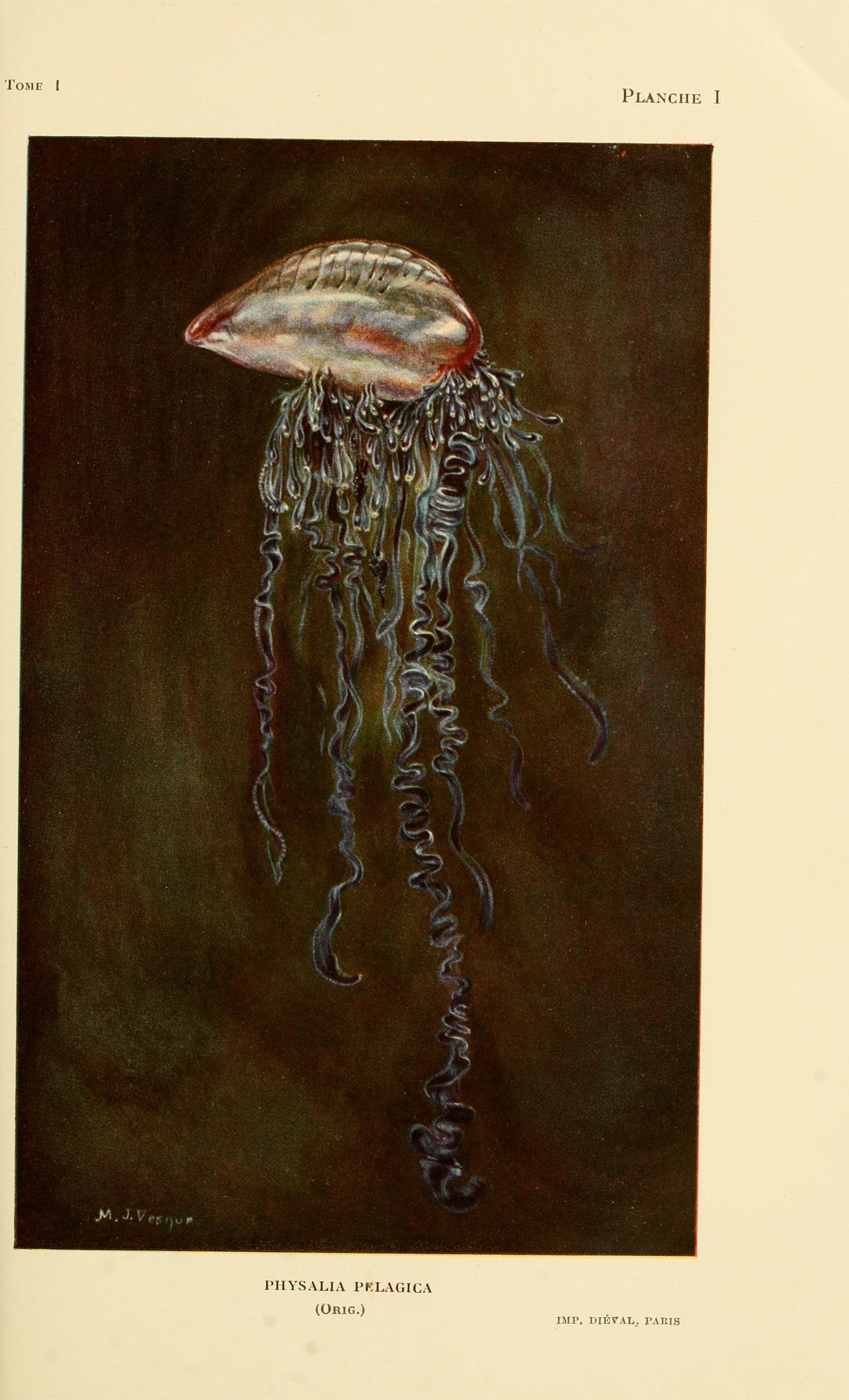
Physalia pelagica illustrated by the Vesque sisters

In their spare time they were to be found at the circus or music-hall, busily recording the acts, engaging the circus staff in conversation, and adding impressions to their journal. They steadfastly refused to sell their paintings, but presented some to favoured friends, such as journalists and circus historians, who were equally addicted to the world of circus. Before her death in 1949, Marthe Vesque elicited a promise from her sister to never dispose of their work. However, a few years before her own death, Juliette started donating it piecemeal to the Musée national des Arts et Traditions Populaires, founded by the circus enthusiast, Georges-Henri Rivière.

Juliette ceased her circus sketches after Marthe's death, but contributed articles to the circus magazine, Le Cirque dans l’Univers. By then she was widely regarded as an authority on the circus world. After Juliette's death the remainder of the collection of some 8 000 drawings, including the sisters' journal, found their way to the Musée national des Arts et Traditions Populaires by 1968.

== Bibliography ==
- Le Cirque en Images - Edith Mauriange and Paul Bouissac/Marthe and Juliette Vesque, (G.P. Maisonneuve et Larose, Paris, 1977) ISBN 2706806494
- Theatres De Marionnettes Du Nord De La France - Marthe Vesque, Juliette Vesque and Marie-Claude Groshens (1983) ISBN 2706806494
- En Piste! Le cirque en images des sœurs Vesque - Bernadette Boustany, (Découvertes Gallimard Albums, Paris 1992) ISBN 2-07-056659-5
