= Dipterocarpus rigidus =

Conservation status
- Vulnerable (IUCN 3.1)

Scientific classification
- Kingdom: Plantae
- Clade: Tracheophytes
- Clade: Angiosperms
- Clade: Eudicots
- Clade: Rosids
- Order: Malvales
- Family: Dipterocarpaceae
- Genus: Dipterocarpus
- Species: D. rigidus

Binomial name
- Dipterocarpus rigidus Ridl.

Species of flowering plant

Dipterocarpus rigidus grows as a large tree up to 50 m (160 ft) tall, with a trunk diameter of up to 1 m (3 ft). The bark is rust-brown. The fruits are roundish, up to 5 cm (2 in) in diameter. Its habitat is mixed dipterocarp forest on low hills near coasts. Dipterocarpus rigidus is found in Sumatra, Peninsular Malaysia, and Borneo.
