= Dipterocarpus insignis =

Conservation status
- Endangered (IUCN 3.1)

Scientific classification
- Kingdom: Plantae
- Clade: Tracheophytes
- Clade: Angiosperms
- Clade: Eudicots
- Clade: Rosids
- Order: Malvales
- Family: Dipterocarpaceae
- Genus: Dipterocarpus
- Species: D. insignis

Binomial name
- Dipterocarpus insignis Thwaites

Species of flowering plant

Dipterocarpus insignis (Sinhalese Weli-dorana) is a species of flowering plant in the family Dipterocarpaceae. It is a large tree endemic to southwestern Sri Lanka. It grows in lowland rain forest, where it occurs in scattered populations. The species is threatened by selective logging for timber and by habitat loss as forests are cleared for tea plantations. The IUCN Red List assesses the species as endangered.

The species was first described by George Henry Kendrick Thwaites in 1858.
