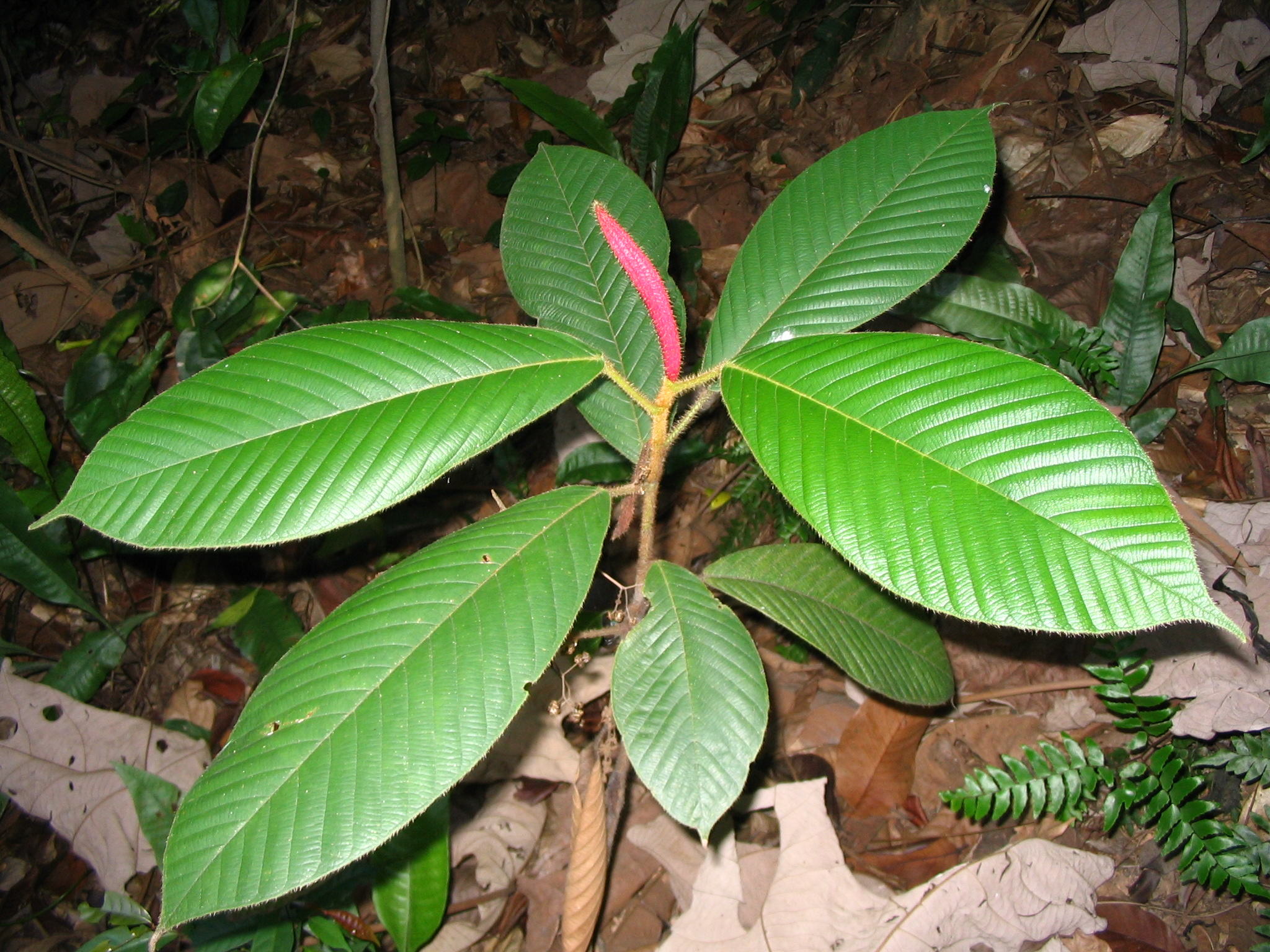

Conservation status
- Vulnerable (IUCN 3.1)

Scientific classification
- Kingdom: Plantae
- Clade: Tracheophytes
- Clade: Angiosperms
- Clade: Eudicots
- Clade: Rosids
- Order: Malvales
- Family: Dipterocarpaceae
- Genus: Dipterocarpus
- Species: D. baudii

Binomial name
- Dipterocarpus baudii Korth.

Synonyms
- Dipterocarpus scortechinii King; Dipterocarpus pilosus Brandis; Dipterocarpus duperreana Pierre ex Laness.

= Dipterocarpus baudii =

Species of tree

Dipterocarpus baudii is the accepted name of a tropical forest tree species in the family Dipterocarpaceae; there are no known subspecies.

== Description ==
This emergent tree species grows up to 40 m high, with obovate-elliptic leaves up to 250 mm long and has seeds with winged lobes that are 150–180 mm long. D. baudii has been recorded from Burma, Cambodia, Malesia, Thailand and Vietnam (Da Nang to Dong Nai Provinces), where it may be called dầu Baud.

== Gallery ==
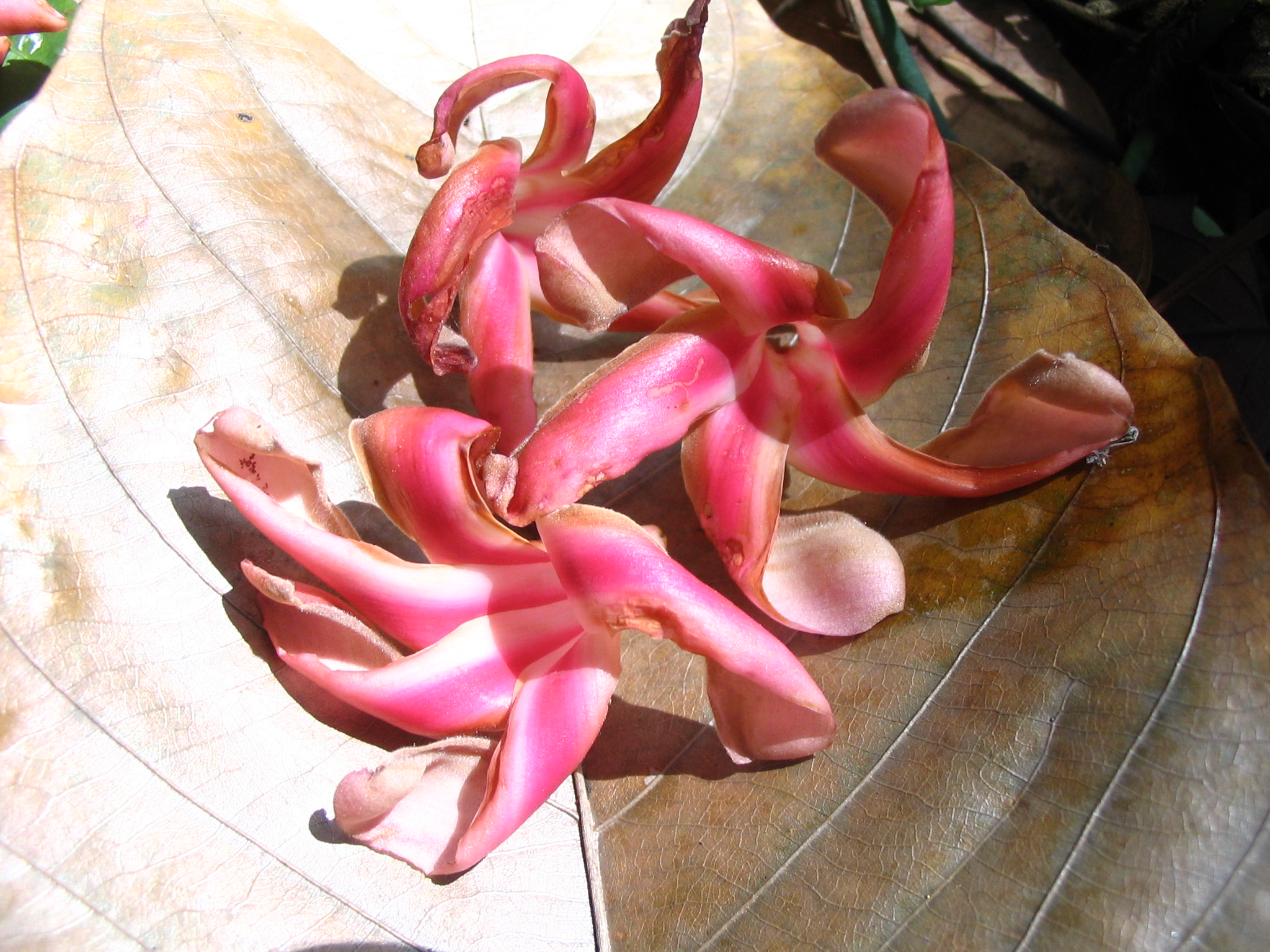

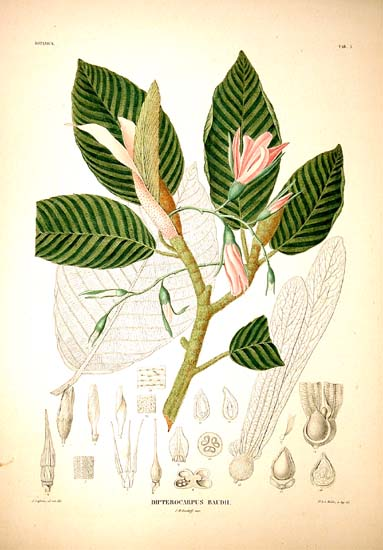
