= Dipterocarpus semivestitus =

Conservation status
- Endangered (IUCN 3.1)

Scientific classification
- Kingdom: Plantae
- Clade: Tracheophytes
- Clade: Angiosperms
- Clade: Eudicots
- Clade: Rosids
- Order: Malvales
- Family: Dipterocarpaceae
- Genus: Dipterocarpus
- Species: D. semivestitus

Binomial name
- Dipterocarpus semivestitus Slooten

Species of flowering plant

Dipterocarpus semivestitus is a species of tree in the family Dipterocarpaceae, native to southeastern Borneo (Kalimantan) and Perak in Peninsular Malaysia. This tree is almost always found in lowland forest on swampy land. The species is threatened by timber harvesting and habitat loss from conversion of lowland forest to agriculture and plantations. The IUCN Red List assessed the species as Endangered, and it is very close to extinction in Peninsular Malaysia.

The species was described by Dirk Fok van Slooten in 1927.
