= Shorea atrinervosa =

Conservation status
- Vulnerable (IUCN 3.1)

Scientific classification
- Kingdom: Plantae
- Clade: Tracheophytes
- Clade: Angiosperms
- Clade: Eudicots
- Clade: Rosids
- Order: Malvales
- Family: Dipterocarpaceae
- Genus: Shorea
- Species: S. atrinervosa

Binomial name
- Shorea atrinervosa Symington

Species of tree

Shorea atrinervosa is a species of plant in the family Dipterocarpaceae. The species name is derived from Latin (ater = dull black and nervosus = nerved) and refers to leaf venation which is black in herbarium specimens.

It is an emergent tree, up to 50 metres (160 ft), found in mixed dipterocarp forest on clay-rich soils. S. atrinervosa is found in Peninsular Malaysia, Sumatra and Borneo. It is found in at least four protected areas (Ulu Telupid and Bidu Bidu Forest Reserves and Lambir and Gunung Mulu National Parks).
