= Dipterocarpus coriaceus =

Conservation status
- Critically Endangered (IUCN 3.1)

Scientific classification
- Kingdom: Plantae
- Clade: Tracheophytes
- Clade: Angiosperms
- Clade: Eudicots
- Clade: Rosids
- Order: Malvales
- Family: Dipterocarpaceae
- Genus: Dipterocarpus
- Species: D. coriaceus

Binomial name
- Dipterocarpus coriaceus Slooten

Species of tree

Dipterocarpus coriaceus is a species of tree in the family Dipterocarpaceae endemic to Borneo (Kalimantan and Sarawak), Peninsular Malaysia, and Sumatra including Sembilang National Park and Batam in the Riau Islands. It grows in lowland peat swamp forests and lowland rain forests. In July 2013 the New Straits Times reported the species to be extinct in Peninsular Malaysia, as its last natural habitat in Bikam Forest Reserve in Perak was de-gazetted and cleared for oil palm cultivation.

The species was first described by Dirk Fok van Slooten in 1927.
