= Lanjak Entimau Wildlife Sanctuary =

Wildlife sanctuary on the island of Borneo, Malaysia

- IUCN category IV (habitat/species management area)
- Location within Borneo
- Location: Sarawak, Malaysia
- Nearest city: Kuching
- Coordinates: 1°31′N 112°10′E
- Area: 1,870 km^{2} (720 sq mi)
- Established: 1983
- Governing body: Forest Department

Lanjak Entimau Wildlife Sanctuary is a 1,870 km^{2} (1,870 km^{2}) large protected area on the island of Borneo in Sarawak, Malaysia. It is significant for orangutan conservation. Together with Batang Ai National Park these protected areas host an estimated 1,400 orangutans. Hunting and illegal logging are only minor problems in these areas, but could become serious if not monitored, especially because the areas are contiguous with Indonesia, where illegal logging is rampant.

Together with the Betung Kerihun National Park in Indonesia, it has been proposed to form a World Heritage Site named the "Transborder Rainforest Heritage of Borneo".

== See also ==
- Deforestation in Borneo
