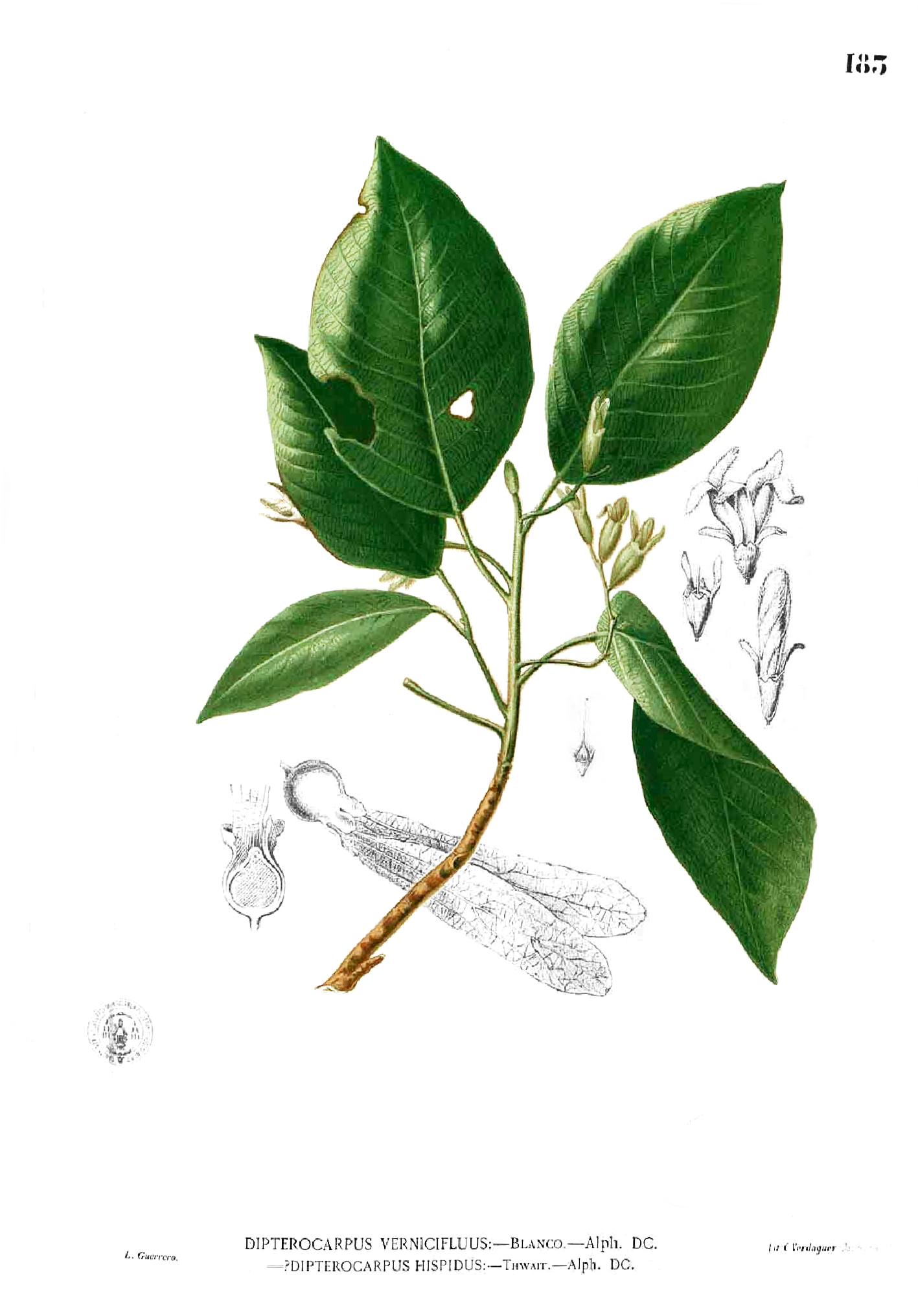

Conservation status
- Vulnerable (IUCN 3.1)

Scientific classification
- Kingdom: Plantae
- Clade: Tracheophytes
- Clade: Angiosperms
- Clade: Eudicots
- Clade: Rosids
- Order: Malvales
- Family: Dipterocarpaceae
- Genus: Dipterocarpus
- Species: D. gracilis

Binomial name
- Dipterocarpus gracilis Blume

Synonyms
- Dipterocarpus pilosus Roxb.; Mocanera verniciflua Blanco; Dipterocarpus vernicifluus Blanco; Dipterocarpus marginatus Korth.; Dipterocarpus fulvus Blume; Anisoptera palembanica Miq.; Dipterocarpus hispidus Fern.-Vill.; Dipterocarpus velutinus S.Vidal; Dipterocarpus bancanus Burck; Dipterocarpus skinneri King; Dipterocarpus turbinatus var. andamanicus King; Dipterocarpus vanderhoevenii Koord. & Valeton; Shorea mollis Boerl.; Dipterocarpus angustialatus F.Heim; Dipterocarpus schmidtii F.Heim; Dipterocarpus andamanicus (King) Tewary & A.K.Sarkar

= Dipterocarpus gracilis =

Species of tree

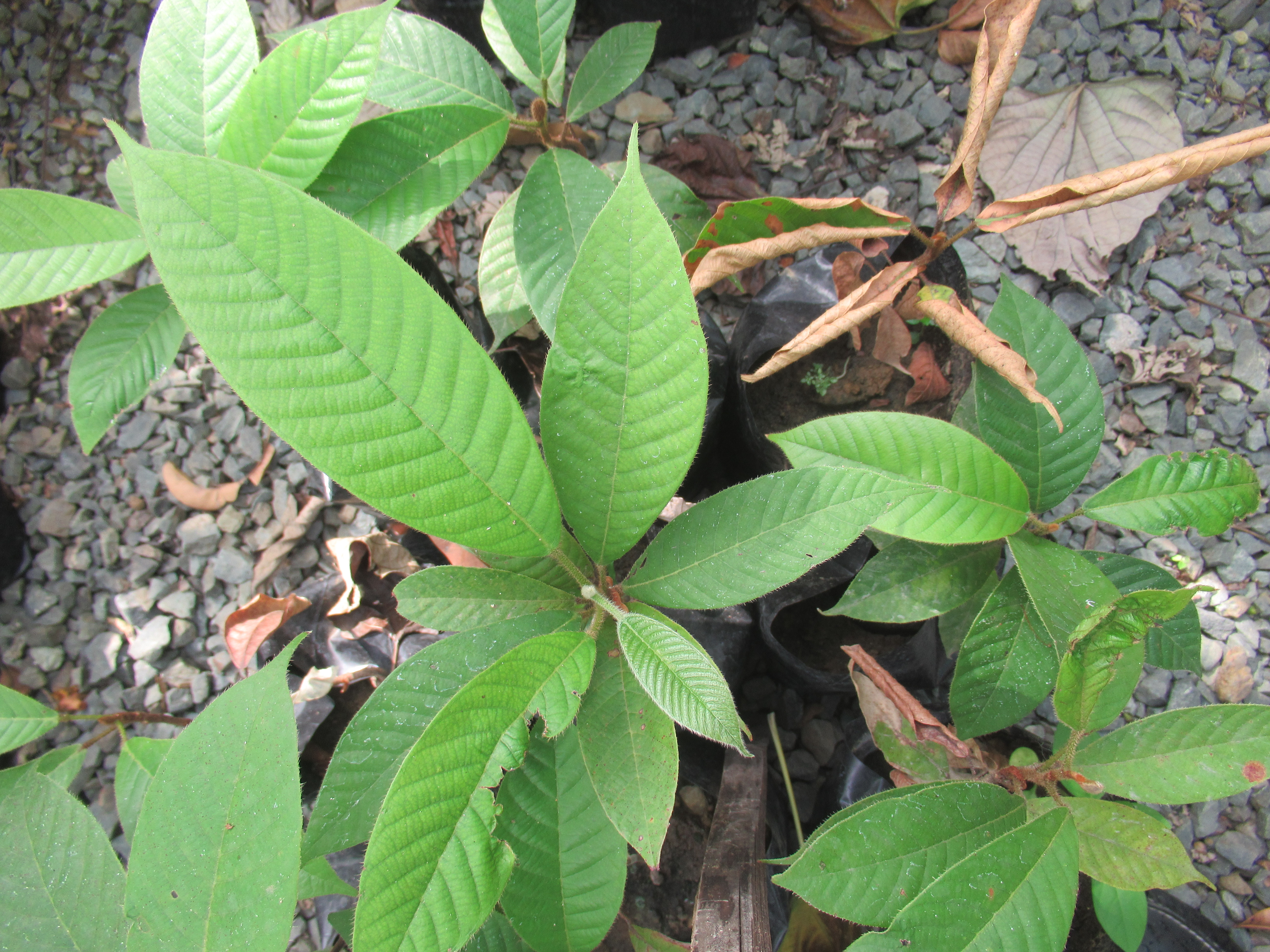
Panao seedling (Philippines)

Dipterocarpus gracilis (Tagalog: panao / Indonesia: kaboa aka sancang) is a Vulnerable species of tree in the family Dipterocarpaceae, native to South Asia and Southeast Asia.

== Distribution and habitat ==
D. gracilis is native to Bangladesh, Brunei, Cambodia, India (Assam and the Andaman Islands), Indonesia (Kalimantan, Java, and Sumatra), Malaysia (Sarawak, Sabah, and Peninsular Malaysia), Myanmar, the Philippines, Singapore, and Thailand. It grows in lowland evergreen and semi-evergreen forests, in valleys, and on ridges and slopes from sea level up to 900 m (3,000 ft) above sea level. It prefers well-drained soils and often dominates the canopy of the forests it inhabits.

== Uses ==
It is often used as a commercial grade plywood, it is one of the most important sources of keruing timber.
