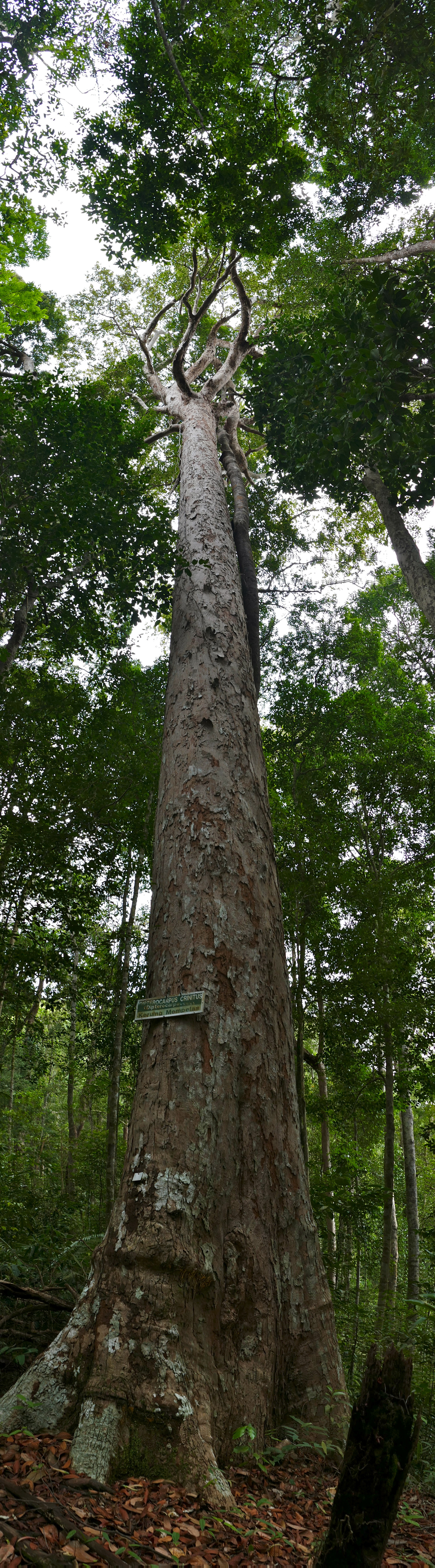

Conservation status
- Vulnerable (IUCN 3.1)

Scientific classification
- Kingdom: Plantae
- Clade: Tracheophytes
- Clade: Angiosperms
- Clade: Eudicots
- Clade: Rosids
- Order: Malvales
- Family: Dipterocarpaceae
- Genus: Dipterocarpus
- Species: D. crinitus

Binomial name
- Dipterocarpus crinitus Dyer

= Dipterocarpus crinitus =

Species of tree

Dipterocarpus crinitus (Indonesian: tampurau) is a species of plant in the family Dipterocarpaceae. The species name is derived from Latin (crinitus = having tufts of long weak hair) and refers to golden-brown bristle-like hairs that cover the plant parts. It is an emergent tree, up to 60 m tall, in mixed dipterocarp forest on sandy clay soils. It is a medium hardwood sold under the trade names of keruing. It is found in Peninsular Thailand, Sumatra, Peninsular Malaysia and Borneo.
