= Dipterocarpus elongatus =

Conservation status
- Vulnerable (IUCN 3.1)

Scientific classification
- Kingdom: Plantae
- Clade: Tracheophytes
- Clade: Angiosperms
- Clade: Eudicots
- Clade: Rosids
- Order: Malvales
- Family: Dipterocarpaceae
- Genus: Dipterocarpus
- Species: D. elongatus

Binomial name
- Dipterocarpus elongatus Korth.

Species of tree

Dipterocarpus elongatus is a species of tree in the family Dipterocarpaceae found in Indonesia (Kalimantan and Sumatra), Malaysia (Peninsular Malaysia and Sarawak) and Singapore. This large tree occurs in secondary and primary forest, as well as in freshwater swamp forest.
