= Dipterocarpus dyeri =

Conservation status
- Endangered (IUCN 3.1)

Scientific classification
- Kingdom: Plantae
- Clade: Embryophytes
- Clade: Tracheophytes
- Clade: Angiosperms
- Clade: Eudicots
- Clade: Rosids
- Order: Malvales
- Family: Dipterocarpaceae
- Genus: Dipterocarpus
- Species: D. dyeri

Binomial name
- Dipterocarpus dyeri Pierre

Species of tree

Dipterocarpus dyeri (Khmer: rôyiëng, chhë tiël pruhs, chhë tiël th'nô:r, local name Kompong Thom: chhieutiel chgor, name used for commercial timber and the group of trees harvested for such: keruing, Vietnamese: Dầu Song Nàng, is a species of tree in the family Dipterocarpaceae found in Myanmar, Thailand, Peninsular Malaysia (Kedah, Perlis), Cambodia, Vietnam, and northwestern Borneo. The tree is found in rain forest and lowland semi-evergreen dipterocarp forests, an alternative habitat description is mixed dense forests of the plains, mainly among rivers and valleys. The tree is a climax or late successional species, which in some secondary forests forms relatively young pure colonies. The conservation status is based on rates of habitat loss, the major threat to the taxa, though in Vietnam it is cited as having a less threatened conservation status of Vulnerable.

In Cambodia the wood is classified as of the 2nd best category, and is in great demand for house and boat construction.

The following insects are associated with and prey on the seed of D. costatus: Alcidodes, particularly Alcidodes crassus, Pempelia, Salebria, Dichocrocis, Andrioplecta pulverula, and Andrioplecta shoreae.
