= Dipterocarpus applanatus =

Conservation status
- Vulnerable (IUCN 3.1)

Scientific classification
- Kingdom: Plantae
- Clade: Tracheophytes
- Clade: Angiosperms
- Clade: Eudicots
- Clade: Rosids
- Order: Malvales
- Family: Dipterocarpaceae
- Genus: Dipterocarpus
- Species: D. applanatus

Binomial name
- Dipterocarpus applanatus Slooten

Species of tree

Dipterocarpus applanatus is a species of tree in the family Dipterocarpaceae. It is endemic to Borneo.
