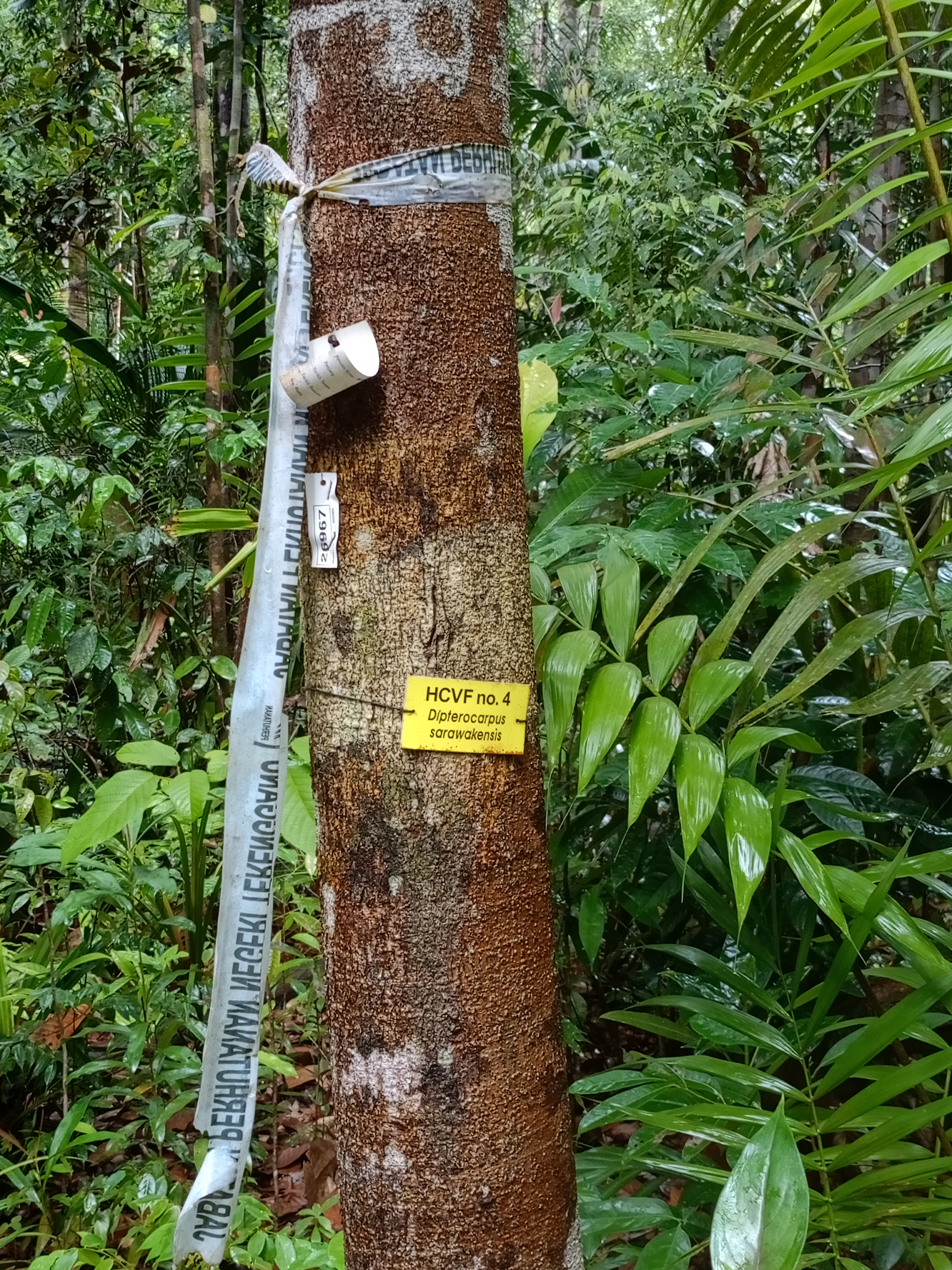
- Bark

Conservation status
- Vulnerable (IUCN 3.1)

Scientific classification
- Kingdom: Plantae
- Clade: Embryophytes
- Clade: Tracheophytes
- Clade: Spermatophytes
- Clade: Angiosperms
- Clade: Eudicots
- Clade: Rosids
- Order: Malvales
- Family: Dipterocarpaceae
- Genus: Dipterocarpus
- Species: D. sarawakensis

Binomial name
- Dipterocarpus sarawakensis Slooten

= Dipterocarpus sarawakensis =

Species of tree

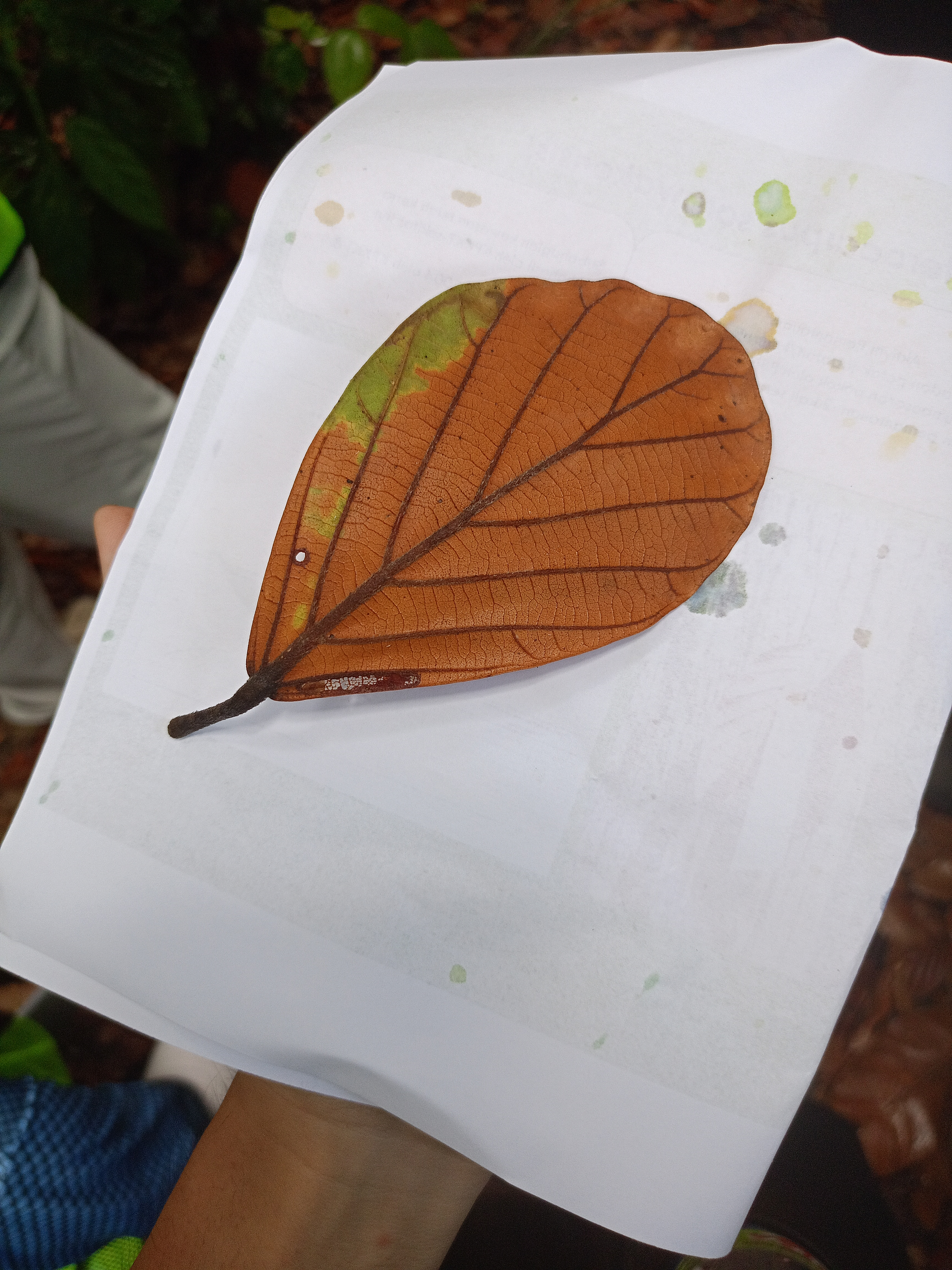
Leaf

Dipterocarpus sarawakensis, locally called the Sarawak keruing, is a species of tree in the family Dipterocarpaceae, found in Peninsular Malaysia and Borneo. It is locally common on leached sandy soils on low coastal hills.

The species was thought to be present uniquely in Sarawak (hence its specific name) until the discovery of 53 trees in Jerangau Forest Reserve at the end of 2004.
