= Dipterocarpus kerrii =

Conservation status
- Endangered (IUCN 3.1)

Scientific classification
- Kingdom: Plantae
- Clade: Tracheophytes
- Clade: Angiosperms
- Clade: Eudicots
- Clade: Rosids
- Order: Malvales
- Family: Dipterocarpaceae
- Genus: Dipterocarpus
- Species: D. kerrii

Binomial name
- Dipterocarpus kerrii King

Synonyms
- Dipterocarpus cuneatus Foxw.; Dipterocarpus obconicus Foxw.; Dipterocarpus perturbinatus Foxw.

Species of tree

Dipterocarpus kerrii is a species of tree in the family Dipterocarpaceae. It is native to the Andaman Islands, Sumatra, Borneo, Peninsular Malaysia, Laos, Myanmar, the Philippines, Singapore, Thailand and Vietnam.

This species is locally common in lowland semi-evergreen and evergreen dipterocarp forest. It is cut for keruing timber and yields oil (commonly called the keruing oil) for the region.

The species is named after the Irish botanist A.F.G. Kerr.
