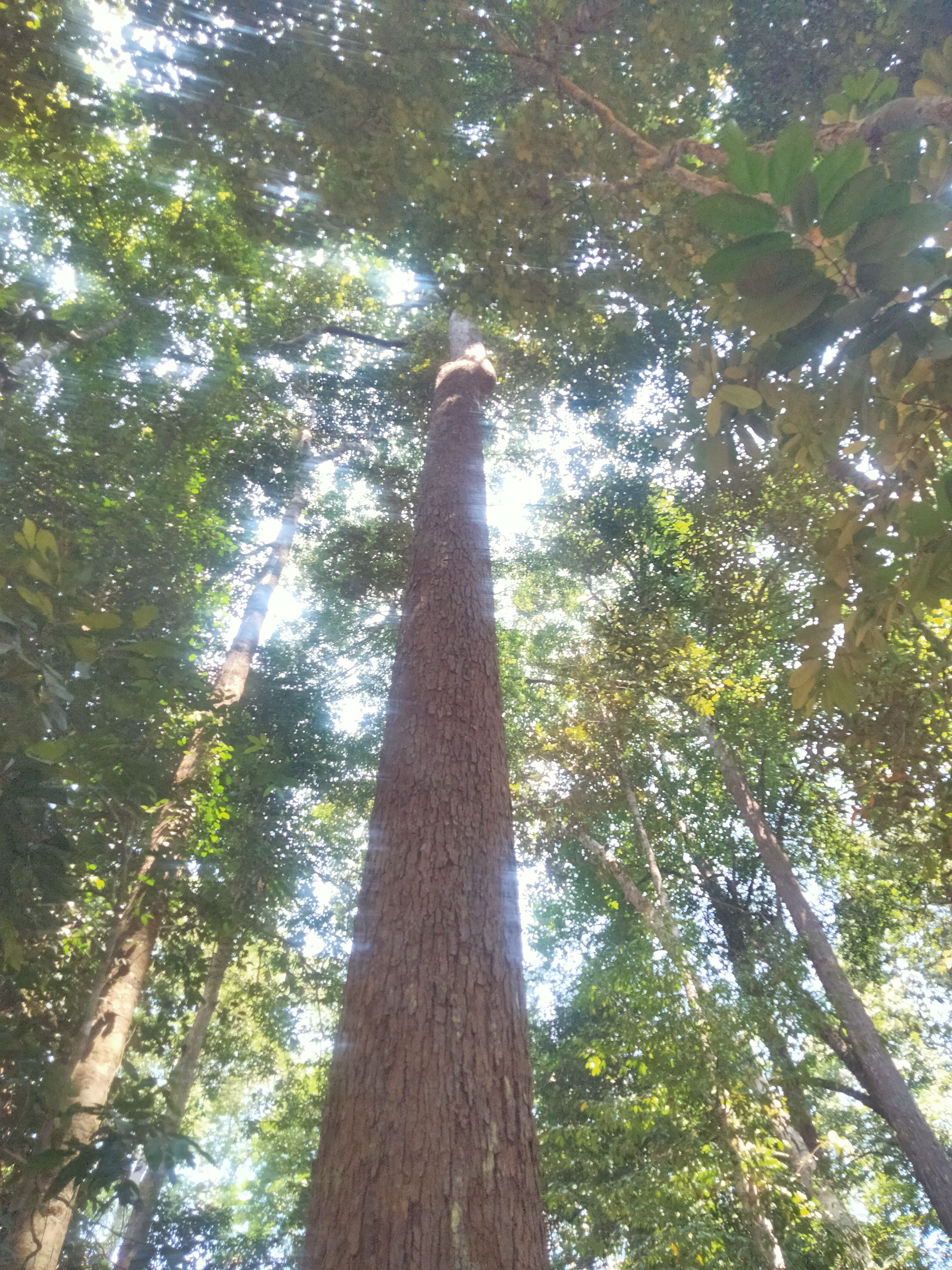
- At Sungai Pandan Recreational Forest, Malaysia

Conservation status
- Near Threatened (IUCN 3.1)

Scientific classification
- Kingdom: Plantae
- Clade: Tracheophytes
- Clade: Angiosperms
- Clade: Eudicots
- Clade: Rosids
- Order: Malvales
- Family: Dipterocarpaceae
- Genus: Dipterocarpus
- Species: D. costulatus

Binomial name
- Dipterocarpus costulatus Slooten

= Dipterocarpus costulatus =

Species of tree

Dipterocarpus costulatus is a species of tree in the family Dipterocarpaceae. It grows up to 50 m (160 ft) tall.

== Distribution and habitat ==
Dipterocarpus costulatus is native to Peninsular Malaysia, Singapore, Borneo and Sumatra. Its habitat is in lowland kerangas forest or hill forest from sea level to 600 m (2,000 ft) altitude.

== Conservation ==
Dipterocarpus costulatus is threatened by logging and habitat loss, particularly in Borneo. The tree is logged for its hardwood. Forests where the species is present are being cleared for agricultural or plantation development. More frequent fires threaten lowland populations.
