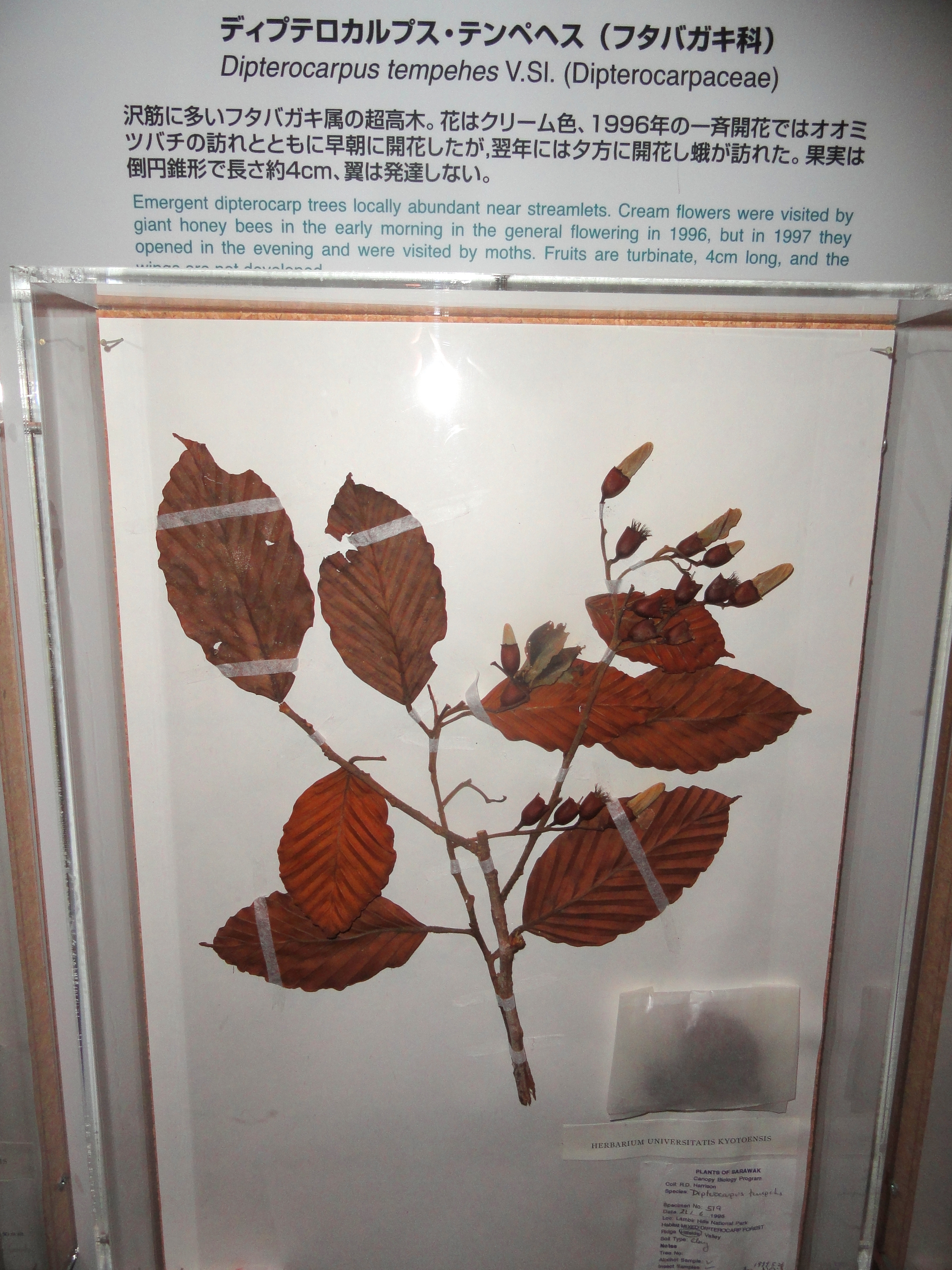

Conservation status
- Endangered (IUCN 3.1)

Scientific classification
- Kingdom: Plantae
- Clade: Tracheophytes
- Clade: Angiosperms
- Clade: Eudicots
- Clade: Rosids
- Order: Malvales
- Family: Dipterocarpaceae
- Genus: Dipterocarpus
- Species: D. tempehes

Binomial name
- Dipterocarpus tempehes Slooten

= Dipterocarpus tempehes =

Species of tree

Dipterocarpus tempehes is a species of tree in the family Dipterocarpaceae. It is endemic to Borneo. The tree is found in swampy areas and along streams. It grows up to 45 metres (150 ft) high.
