= Dipterocarpus validus =

Conservation status
- Least Concern (IUCN 3.1)

Scientific classification
- Kingdom: Plantae
- Clade: Tracheophytes
- Clade: Angiosperms
- Clade: Eudicots
- Clade: Rosids
- Order: Malvales
- Family: Dipterocarpaceae
- Genus: Dipterocarpus
- Species: D. validus

Binomial name
- Dipterocarpus validus Blume

Synonyms
- Dipterocarpus affinis Brandis; Dipterocarpus lasiopodus G.Perkins; Dipterocarpus warburgii Brandis; Dipterocarpus woodii Merr.

Species of tree

Dipterocarpus validus is a species of tree in the family Dipterocarpaceae, endemic to Kalimantan, Sabah and the Philippines. The species is common in both primary and secondary forest, often occurring along rivers and in freshwater swamps. It yields wood-oil and is cut for keruing timber.
