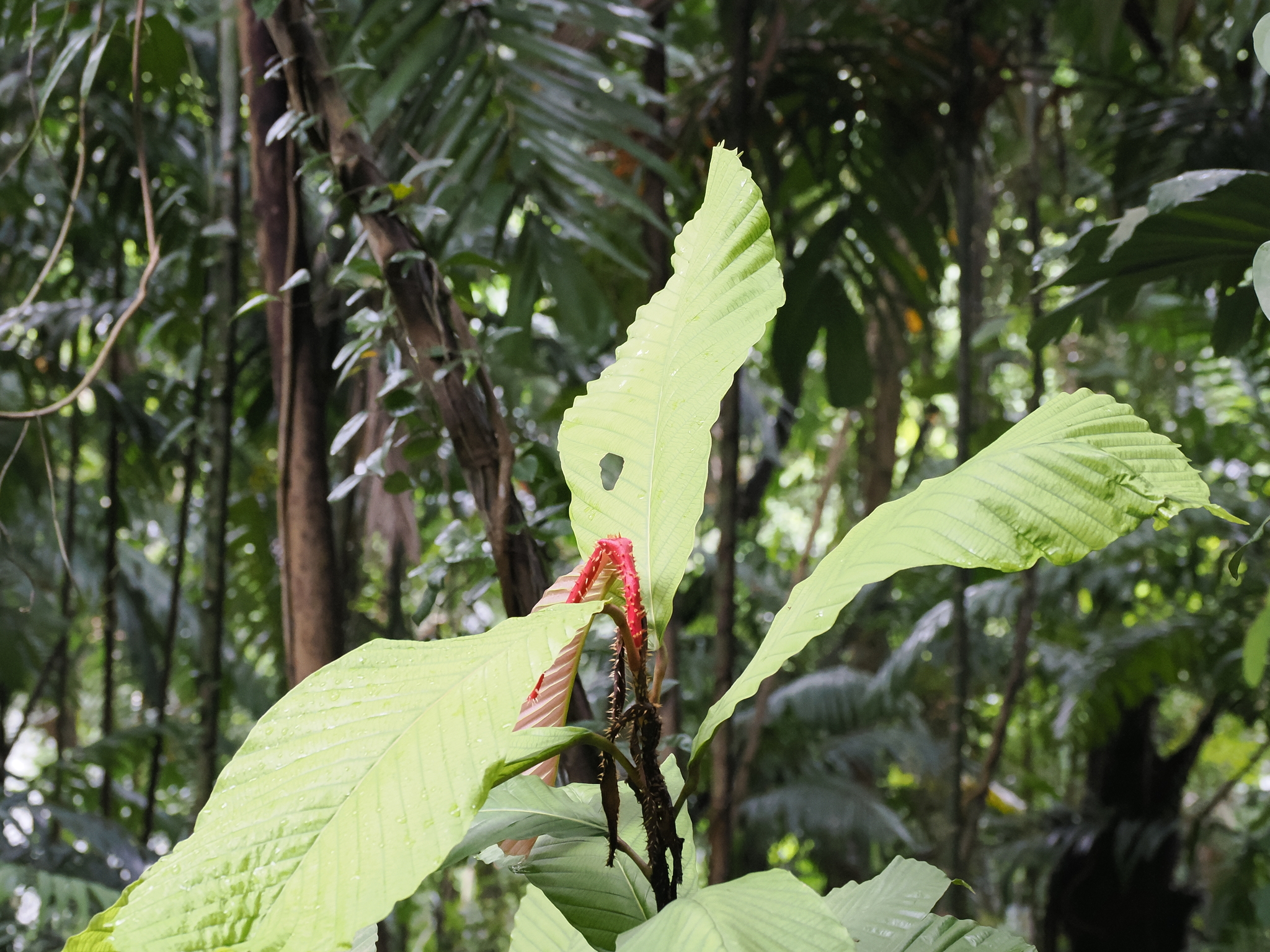
- In Singapore

Conservation status
- Least Concern (IUCN 3.1)

Scientific classification
- Kingdom: Plantae
- Clade: Tracheophytes
- Clade: Angiosperms
- Clade: Eudicots
- Clade: Rosids
- Order: Malvales
- Family: Dipterocarpaceae
- Genus: Dipterocarpus
- Species: D. cornutus

Binomial name
- Dipterocarpus cornutus Dyer

= Dipterocarpus cornutus =

Species of tree

Dipterocarpus cornutus is a species of tree in the family Dipterocarpaceae native to Peninsular Malaysia, Singapore, Sumatra, and Kalimantan. Reaching heights of up to 50 meters tall, it is known for having large leaves. Its flowers are around 4 cm in diameter and of a pale yellow colouration. It drops seeds with green holes in the middle.
