= Dipterocarpus eurhynchus =

Conservation status
- Near Threatened (IUCN 3.1)

Scientific classification
- Kingdom: Plantae
- Clade: Tracheophytes
- Clade: Angiosperms
- Clade: Eudicots
- Clade: Rosids
- Order: Malvales
- Family: Dipterocarpaceae
- Genus: Dipterocarpus
- Species: D. eurhynchus

Binomial name
- Dipterocarpus eurhynchus Miq.

Species of tree

Dipterocarpus eurhynchus is a species of tree in the family Dipterocarpaceae. The tree is found in Borneo (except Sabah), Sumatra, Peninsular Malaysia and the Philippines. This species occurs in mixed dipterocarp forest on leached clay soils up to 1000 metres elevation.
