= Dipterocarpus acutangulus =

Conservation status
- Endangered (IUCN 3.1)

Scientific classification
- Kingdom: Plantae
- Clade: Tracheophytes
- Clade: Angiosperms
- Clade: Eudicots
- Clade: Rosids
- Order: Malvales
- Family: Dipterocarpaceae
- Genus: Dipterocarpus
- Species: D. acutangulus

Binomial name
- Dipterocarpus acutangulus Vesque

Species of tree

Dipterocarpus acutangulus is a species of tree in the family Dipterocarpaceae. The species name acutangulus is derived from Latin (angulus = angle, acutus = sharp) and refers to the ribs of the fruit calyx tube. It is native to peninsular Thailand and Malaysia and also Borneo, where it is locally known as keruing merkah or keruing beludu. It is an emergent tree up to 60 m tall. The tree occurs in mixed dipterocarp forests found on sandy and sandy clay soils on coastal hills and inland ridges, up to 1000 m elevation. It occurs in at least one protected area (Kabili-Sepilok Forest Reserve).
