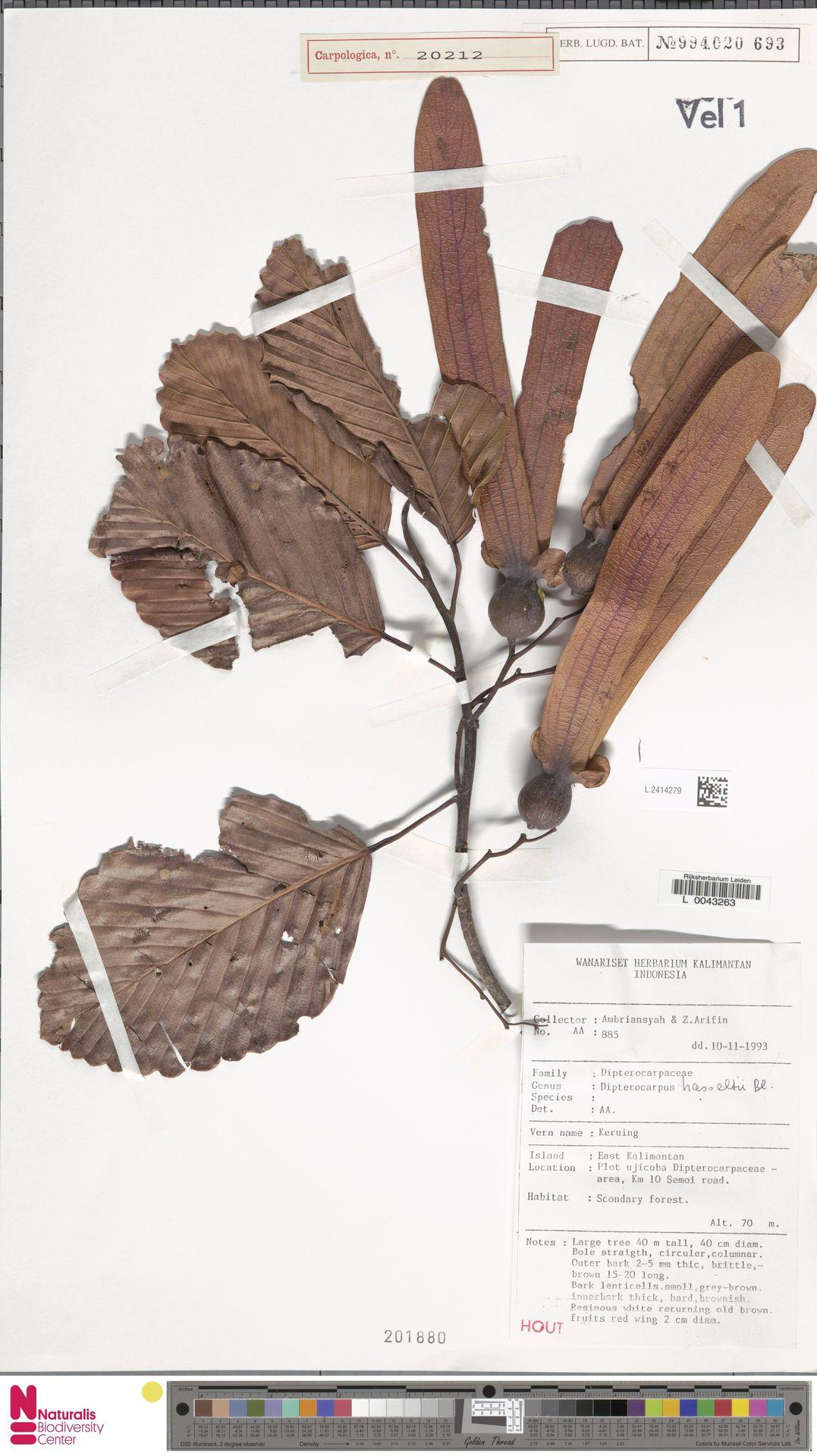
- Specimen

Conservation status
- Endangered (IUCN 3.1)

Scientific classification
- Kingdom: Plantae
- Clade: Tracheophytes
- Clade: Angiosperms
- Clade: Eudicots
- Clade: Rosids
- Order: Malvales
- Family: Dipterocarpaceae
- Genus: Dipterocarpus
- Species: D. hasseltii

Binomial name
- Dipterocarpus hasseltii Blume

Synonyms
- Dipterocarpus balsamifer Blume; Dipterocarpus lampongus Scheff.; Dipterocarpus pentagonus A.DC.; Dipterocarpus quinquegonus Blume; Dipterocarpus subalpinus Foxw.; Dipterocarpus tampurau Korth.

= Dipterocarpus hasseltii =

Species of tree

Dipterocarpus hasseltii is a species of tree in the family Dipterocarpaceae. It is found in Indonesia (Bali, Java, Kalimantan, Sumatra), Peninsular Malaysia, Sabah, the Philippines, Thailand and Vietnam. This large tree occurs in lowland dipterocarp forest and is cut for keruing timber.
