= Dipterocarpus lamellatus =

Conservation status
- Critically Endangered (IUCN 3.1)

Scientific classification
- Kingdom: Plantae
- Clade: Tracheophytes
- Clade: Angiosperms
- Clade: Eudicots
- Clade: Rosids
- Order: Malvales
- Family: Dipterocarpaceae
- Genus: Dipterocarpus
- Species: D. lamellatus

Binomial name
- Dipterocarpus lamellatus Hook.f.

Species of tree

Dipterocarpus lamellatus is a tropical rainforest tree endemic to Borneo. It is known from the Beaufort Hills, the Siangau Forest Reserve and Labuan in SW Sabah and Ladan Hills in the Tutong district of Brunei. It is one of the rarest and most endangered of all dipterocarps, with a population size of only twelve individuals, threatened mostly by habitat loss.
