= Dipterocarpus glabrigemmatus =

Conservation status
- Endangered (IUCN 3.1)

Scientific classification
- Kingdom: Plantae
- Clade: Tracheophytes
- Clade: Angiosperms
- Clade: Eudicots
- Clade: Rosids
- Order: Malvales
- Family: Dipterocarpaceae
- Genus: Dipterocarpus
- Species: D. glabrigemmatus

Binomial name
- Dipterocarpus glabrigemmatus P.S.Ashton

Species of tree

Dipterocarpus glabrigemmatus is a species of tree in the family Dipterocarpaceae. The tree is endemic to Borneo (Kalimantan and Sarawak).

== Range and habitat ==
Dipterocarpus glabrigemmatus is known from five locations in Sarawak state of Malaysia, and a single unspecified location in Kalimantan (Indonesian Borneo), where it grows in lowland rainforest. It has an extent of occurrence of 6,327 km^{2} and area of occupancy of 52 km^{2}.

The species is threatened with habitat loss from timber harvesting, fires, and conversion of forest to agriculture. Its conservation status is assessed as endangered.
