= Dipterocarpus ochraceus =

Conservation status
- Endangered (IUCN 3.1)

Scientific classification
- Kingdom: Plantae
- Clade: Tracheophytes
- Clade: Angiosperms
- Clade: Eudicots
- Clade: Rosids
- Order: Malvales
- Family: Dipterocarpaceae
- Genus: Dipterocarpus
- Species: D. ochraceus

Binomial name
- Dipterocarpus ochraceus Meijer

Species of tree

Dipterocarpus ochraceus is a tropical rainforest tree endemic to Sabah. It is known from the ultramafic hills in the Ranau district.

== Description ==
Dipterocarpus ochraceus grows up to 45 meters high, with a trunk up to 1.2 meters in diameter.

== Range and habitat ==
Dipterocarpus ochraceus grows on ridges in hill forests from 600 to 900 meters elevation, typically on ultramafic soils of intermediate fertility. It is typically an emergent tree, rising above the forest canopy. It is absent from the Gymnostoma nobile-dominated forests which grow on the most nutrient-scarce ultramafic soils, and also absent from hill dipterocarp forests on more fertile soils where Shorea parvistipulata is predominant.
