= Dipterocarpus humeratus =

Conservation status
- Near Threatened (IUCN 3.1)

Scientific classification
- Kingdom: Plantae
- Clade: Tracheophytes
- Clade: Angiosperms
- Clade: Eudicots
- Clade: Rosids
- Order: Malvales
- Family: Dipterocarpaceae
- Genus: Dipterocarpus
- Species: D. humeratus

Binomial name
- Dipterocarpus humeratus Slooten

Synonyms
- Dipterocarpus gibbosus Slooten; Dipterocarpus ursinus Slooten

Species of tree

Dipterocarpus humeratus is a species of tree in the family Dipterocarpaceae. The species name humeratus is derived from Latin (humerus = shoulder) and refers to the articulated petiole. D. humeratus is an emergent tree, up to 50 m tall, found in mixed dipterocarp forests on well-drained clay soils. The species is found scattered or semi-gregarious on undulating land and clay ridges below 700 m elevation. It is found in Sumatra and Borneo (Brunei, Sabah, Sarawak and Kalimantan) and occurs in at least three protected areas (Sepilok Forest Reserve, Ulu Temburong and Gunung Mulu National Parks).
