= Shorea laevis =

Conservation status
- Vulnerable (IUCN 3.1)

Scientific classification
- Kingdom: Plantae
- Clade: Tracheophytes
- Clade: Angiosperms
- Clade: Eudicots
- Clade: Rosids
- Order: Malvales
- Family: Dipterocarpaceae
- Genus: Shorea
- Species: S. laevis

Binomial name
- Shorea laevis Ridl.

Synonyms
- Hopea laevifolia Parijs; Shorea laevifolia (Parijs) Endert; Shorea rogersiana Raizada & Smitinand

Species of tree

Shorea laevis is a species of tree in the family Dipterocarpaceae. It is native to Myanmar, Thailand, Sumatra, Peninsular Malaysia and Borneo. It is considered Vulnerable due to deforestation for agriculture and being logged for its timber.
