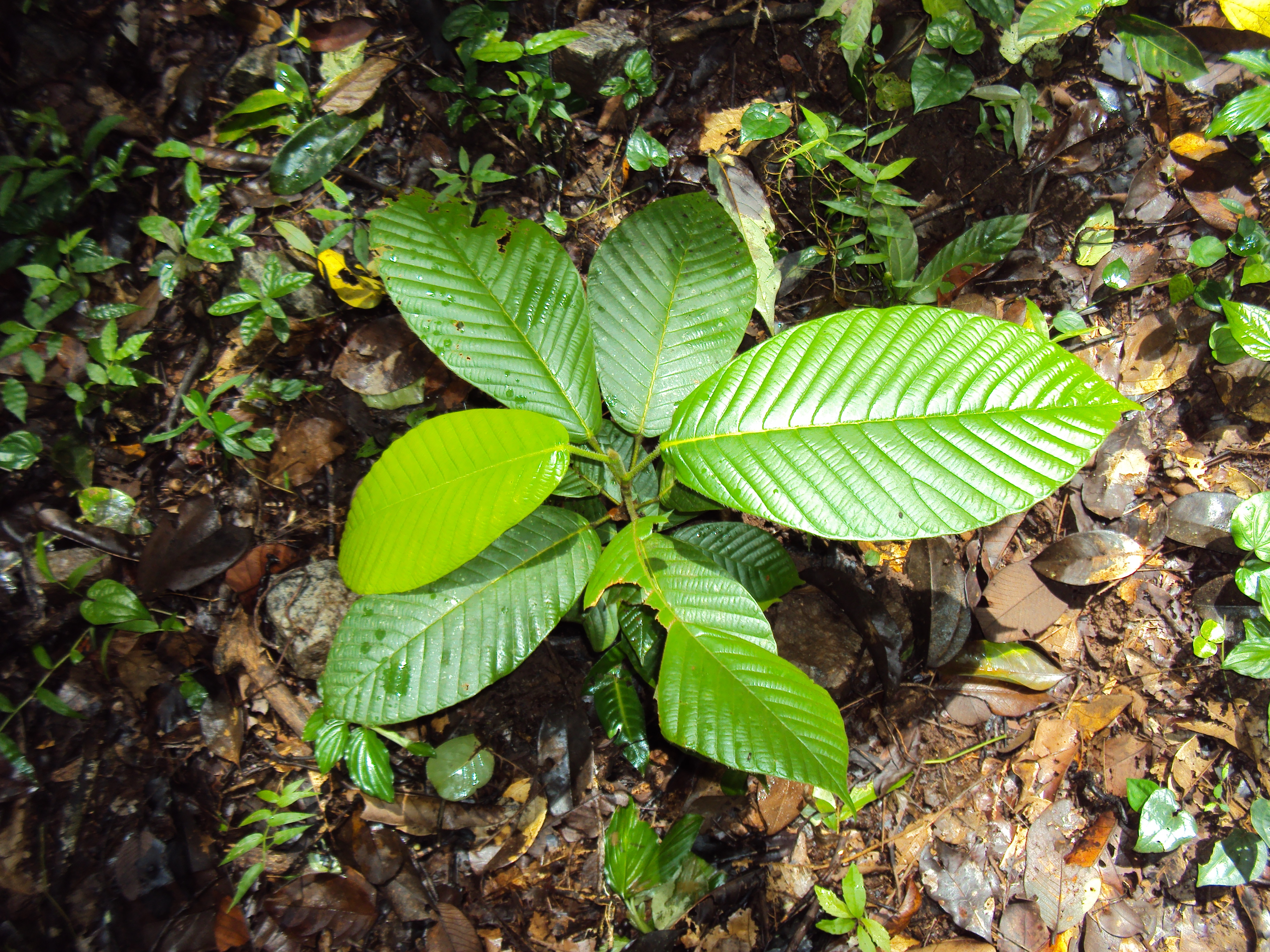

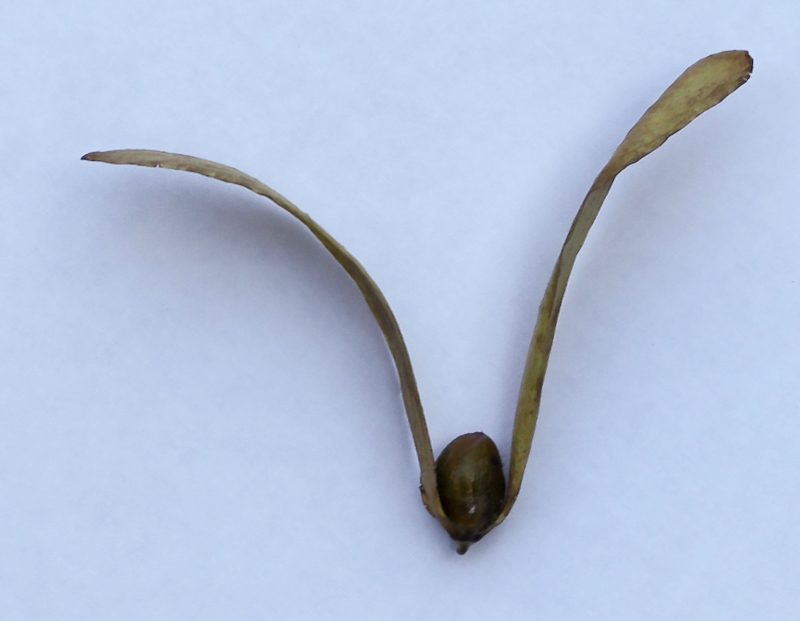
- Sapling of D. bourdillonii and fruit of D. indicus, both from Kerala, India

Scientific classification
- Kingdom: Plantae
- Clade: Embryophytes
- Clade: Tracheophytes
- Clade: Spermatophytes
- Clade: Angiosperms
- Clade: Eudicots
- Clade: Rosids
- Order: Malvales
- Family: Dipterocarpaceae
- Subfamily: Dipterocarpoideae
- Genus: Dipterocarpus; C.F.Gaertn.

Synonyms
- Duvaliella F.Heim; Mocanera Blanco; Oleoxylon Roxb.; Pterigium Corrêa

= Dipterocarpus =

Dipterocarpus Temporal range: Maastrichtian–Recent

Genus of tropical trees

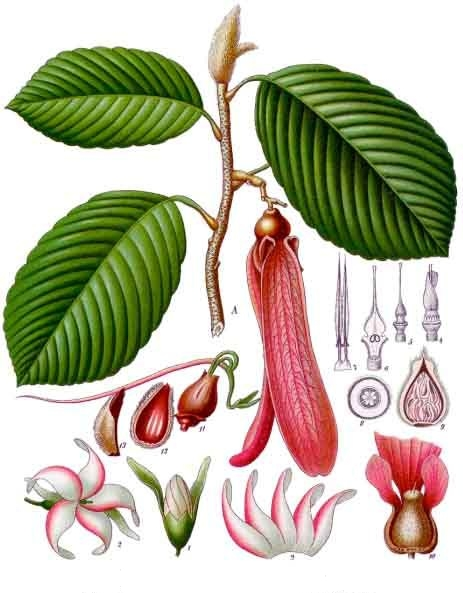
D. retusus in Köhler

Dipterocarpus is a genus of flowering plants and the type genus of family Dipterocarpaceae.

Dipterocarpus is the third-largest and most diverse genus among the Dipterocarpaceae. The species are well known for timber, but less acknowledged for use in traditional herbal medicine. The genus has about 70 species, occurring in South Asia and Southeast Asia, from Sri Lanka and India to the Philippines. It is an important component of dipterocarp forests. Its generic name comes from Greek and means "two-winged fruits".

The greatest diversity of Dipterocarpus species occurs on Borneo, with many endemic to the island. The oldest fossil of the genus, and Dipterocarpaceae, is from the latest Cretaceous (Maastrichtian) Intertrappean Beds of India.

== Uses ==
The genus is of considerable importance as timber trees and for producing resinous oil. The oil is sold under the trade names gurjun oil, kanyin oil, wood oil, and Keruing oil. D. turbinatus, gurjan, is a major commercial timber species found in the Andaman Islands. Gurjan wood is very important for making plywood.

== Accepted species ==
65 species are accepted.

- Dipterocarpus acutangulus Vesque – Peninsular Thailand, Peninsular Malaysia, and Borneo
- Dipterocarpus alatus Roxb. ex G.Don – northeastern India, Sri Lanka, Indochina, Peninsular Malaysia, and Philippines
- Dipterocarpus applanatus Slooten – Borneo
- Dipterocarpus baudii Korth. – Bangladesh, Indochina, Peninsular Malaysia, and Sumatra
- Dipterocarpus borneensis Sooten – Borneo and Sumatra
- Dipterocarpus bourdillonii Brandis – southwestern India
- Dipterocarpus caudiferus Merr. – Borneo
- Dipterocarpus chartaceus Symington – Peninsular Thailand and Peninsular Malaysia
- Dipterocarpus cinereus Slooten – central Sumatra
- Dipterocarpus concavus Foxw. – Peninsular Malaysia and Sumatra
- Dipterocarpus condorensis Pierre – Peninsular Malaysia, Sumatra, Borneo, Philippines, and Vietnam
  - Dipterocarpus condorensis subsp. condorensis – Vietnam (Con Dao) and Philippines (Luzon and Mindanao)
  - Dipterocarpus condorensis subsp. penangianus (Foxw.) P.S.Ashton & Luu – Peninsular Malaysia, Sumatra, and Borneo
- Dipterocarpus confertus Slooten – Borneo
- Dipterocarpus conformis Slooten – northern Sumatra
- Dipterocarpus coriaceus Slooten – Peninsular Malaysia, Sumatra, and Borneo
- Dipterocarpus cornutus Dyer – Peninsular Malaysia, Sumatra, and Borneo
- Dipterocarpus costatus C.F.Gaertn. – Bangladesh, Indochina, and Peninsular Malaysia
- Dipterocarpus costulatus Slooten – Peninsular Malaysia, Sumatra, and Borneo
- Dipterocarpus crinitus Dyer – Peninsular Thailand, Peninsular Malaysia, Sumatra, and Borneo
- Dipterocarpus cuspidatus P.S.Ashton – Borneo (northeastern Sarawak)
- Dipterocarpus dyeri Pierre ex Laness. – Indochina, northern Peninsular Malaysia, and northwestern Borneo
- Dipterocarpus elongatus Korth. – Peninsular Malaysia, Sumatra, and Borneo
- Dipterocarpus eurhynchus Miq. – Peninsular Malaysia, Sumatra, Borneo, southern Philippines
- Dipterocarpus fagineus Vesque – Peninsular Malaysia, Sumatra, and Borneo
- Dipterocarpus fusiformis P.S.Ashton – northeastern Borneo
- Dipterocarpus geniculatus Vesque – Borneo
- Dipterocarpus glabrigemmatus P.S.Ashton – Borneo
- Dipterocarpus glandulosus Thwaites – southwestern Sri Lanka
- Dipterocarpus globosus Vesque – Borneo
- Dipterocarpus gracilis Blume – Assam to western Malesia and the Philippines
- Dipterocarpus grandiflorus (Blanco) Blanco – Bangladesh to Indochina, western Malesia, and the Philippines. The wood is sold as keruing timber
- Dipterocarpus hasseltii Blume – Indochina, western Malesia, Philippines, and Lesser Sunda Islands
- Dipterocarpus hispidus Thwaites – Sri Lanka
- Dipterocarpus humeratus Slooten – Sumatra and Borneo
- Dipterocarpus indicus Bedd. – southwestern India
- Dipterocarpus insignis Thwaites – Sri Lanka
- Dipterocarpus intricatus Dyer – Thailand, Cambodia, Laos, and Vietnam
- Dipterocarpus kerrii King – Myanmar, Thailand, Peninsular Malaysia, Sumatra, Borneo, and the Philippines. The wood is sold as keruing timber
- Dipterocarpus kunstleri King – Peninsular Malaysia, Sumatra, Borneo, and the Philippines
- Dipterocarpus lamellatus Hook.f. – Borneo (southwestern Sabah)
- Dipterocarpus littoralis Blume – southern Java
- Dipterocarpus lowii Hook.f. – Peninsular Malaysia, Sumatra, and Borneo
- Dipterocarpus mundus Slooten – central Borneo
- Dipterocarpus nudus Vesque – northwestern Borneo
- Dipterocarpus oblongifolius Blume – southern Peninsular Thailand, Peninsular Malaysia, and Borneo
- Dipterocarpus obtusifolius Teijsm. ex Miq. – Indochina and Peninsular Malaysia
- Dipterocarpus ochraceus Meijer – northern Borneo
- Dipterocarpus orbicularis Foxw. – Philippines (Luzon)
- Dipterocarpus pachyphyllus Meijer – northern and northwestern Borneo
- Dipterocarpus palembanicus Slooten – Peninsular Malaysia, Sumatra, and Borneo
- Dipterocarpus perakensis P.S.Ashton – Peninsular Malaysia
- Dipterocarpus pseudocornutus P.S.Ashton – Philippines
- Dipterocarpus retusus Blume – Assam and Tibet to China (Yunnan), Indochina, Peninsular Malaysia, Sumatra, Java, and Lesser Sunda Islands
- Dipterocarpus rigidus Ridl. – Peninsular Malaysia, Sumatra, and Borneo
- Dipterocarpus rotundifolius Foxw. – Peninsular Malaysia
- Dipterocarpus sarawakensis Slooten – eastern Peninsular Malaysia and Borneo. Locally called the Sarawak keruing
- Dipterocarpus scaber Buch.-Ham. – Bangladesh
- Dipterocarpus semivestitus Slooten – Peninsular Malaysia (Perak) and southeastern Borneo
- Dipterocarpus stellatus Vesque – western Borneo
- Dipterocarpus sublamellatus Foxw. – Peninsular Malaysia, Sumatra, and Borneo
- Dipterocarpus tempehes Slooten – Borneo
- Dipterocarpus tuberculatus Roxb. – Bangladesh to Indochina
- Dipterocarpus turbinatus C.F.Gaertn. – eastern India to Indochina. The wood is sold as keruing timber
- Dipterocarpus validus Blume – northern and eastern Borneo to the Philippines
- Dipterocarpus verrucosus Foxw. ex Slooten – Peninsular Thailand, Peninsular Malaysia, Sumatra, and Borneo
- Dipterocarpus zeylanicus Thwaites – Sri Lanka
