= Dipterocarpus confertus =

Conservation status
- Near Threatened (IUCN 3.1)

Scientific classification
- Kingdom: Plantae
- Clade: Tracheophytes
- Clade: Angiosperms
- Clade: Eudicots
- Clade: Rosids
- Order: Malvales
- Family: Dipterocarpaceae
- Genus: Dipterocarpus
- Species: D. confertus

Binomial name
- Dipterocarpus confertus Slooten

Species of tree

Dipterocarpus confertus is a species of plant in the family Dipterocarpaceae. The species is named derived from Latin (confertus = crammed together) and probably refers to the indumentum. It is an emergent tree, up to 50 m (160 ft) tall. It is widespread in mixed dipterocarp forest on leached yellow clay soils up to 800 meters elevation. It is endemic to Borneo. The species is threatened by deforestation. It is a medium hardwood sold under the trade names of Keruing. It is found in at least one protected area (Sepilok Forest Reserve).
