= Julien Joseph Vesque =

French botanist (1848–1895)

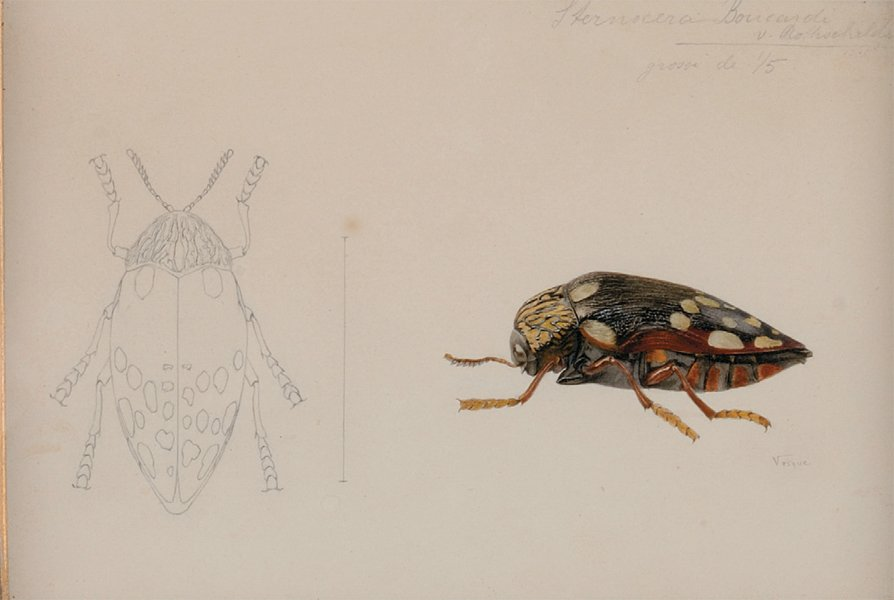
Sternocera castanea rothschildi Pochon Buprestidae

Julien Joseph Vesque (8 April 1848, in Luxembourg – 25 July 1895, in Paris), was a French naturalist, noted for his work on the agricultural and horticultural benefits deriving from the study of plant physiology. He was the father of Marthe and Juliette, the celebrated circus aficionados known as the Vesque Sisters.

Vesque received his early education at the Athénée grand-ducal, moved to Paris in 1871, living and working there for the rest of his life. He held the position of professor from 1880 at the Muséum national d'Histoire naturelle and from 1883 he was professor at the Paris Agricultural Institute, teaching at the Sorbonne during the same period. His main area of study was water transportation in plants. In 1880 he stated that the movement of water in plants is due to both transpiration and root pressure. He was also interested in the effect of temperature on root absorption of water from the soil. Vesque proved that water moved through the cavities of the vessels and not along the walls of plant vessels. During his research he invented laboratory instruments for studying transpiration in plants.

He is denoted by the author abbreviation Vesque when citing a botanical name.

== Bibliography ==
- L’écorce des plantes dicotylédonées (1875)
- Theses Presentees a la Faculte Des Sciences de Paris Pour Obtenir Le Grade de Docteur Es Sciences Naturelles (1876)
- Notice Sur Les Travaux Scientifiques (1883)
- Traité de botanique agricole et industrielle J.-B. Baillière et fils (1885)
- Mémoire Sur L'anatomie Comparée De L'écorce online
