= Frederick William Foxworthy =

American botanist (1877–1950)

Frederick William Foxworthy (1877–1950) was an American botanist and plant collector. He was born in Goodland, Indiana in 1877. He graduated from Cornell University in 1904. He was employed as a botanist of the Bureau of Science in Manila where he specialized in Philippine timber trees. In 1911 he was transferred to the Philippine Bureau of Forestry. In 1918 he joined the Forest Department of the Malay Peninsula in British Malaya. In 1926 he became the first research director of the Forest Research Institute at Kepong, where he established the forest nursery and large experimental plantation. He retired in 1932.

He described and published the names 74 plant species. His co-collectors include Maximo Ramos, Charles Budd Robinson, and Colin Fraser Symington.
