= Brassey Range =

Mountain range in Malaysia

- Location within Borneo

Highest point
- Peak: Mount Danum
- Elevation: 1,093 m (3,586 ft)
- Coordinates: 4°53′59″N 117°30′0″E

Naming
- Etymology: Thomas Brassey

Geography
- Country: Malaysia
- State: Sabah
- Division: Tawau and Sandakan Division
- Districts: Kalabakan, Kinabatangan, Kunak, Lahad Datu, Tawau and Tongod

The Brassey Range is a prominent mountain range located in the eastern part of Sabah, Malaysia. It ranges from Tawau Division up to parts of Sandakan. The range is also home to the Danum Valley Conservation Area. Highlands includes the Segama Highlands.

== Biodiversity ==
The Brassey Range provides a critical continuous habitat corridor for highly threatened Bornean mammals, and it is a stronghold for the Bornean orangutan, Borneo elephant, clouded leopard, sun bear, and the Sunda pangolin.

== Geology ==
The Brassey Range is made up of green serpentine formations, which are mostly covered by jungle, but also uplifted sedimentary rock, alongside the Kuamut and Labang Formation. The Kinabatangan River runs parallel across its foothill. The highest part of the Brassey Range is Mount Danum, which peaks at 1,093 metres (3,586 ft). There is also a volcano field on the southern extend range in the Tawau District.
