= Danum =

Danum may refer to:

- Doncaster in England, known as Danum under the Romans
  - The Danum Academy in Doncaster
- The Danum Platform in Antarctica, named for the British town
- Mount Danum in Malaysia
  - The Danum Valley Conservation Area in Malaysia
- Ot Danum (disambiguation)

== See also ==
- Enyo ocypete, a species of moth formerly sometimes known as Sphinx danum
