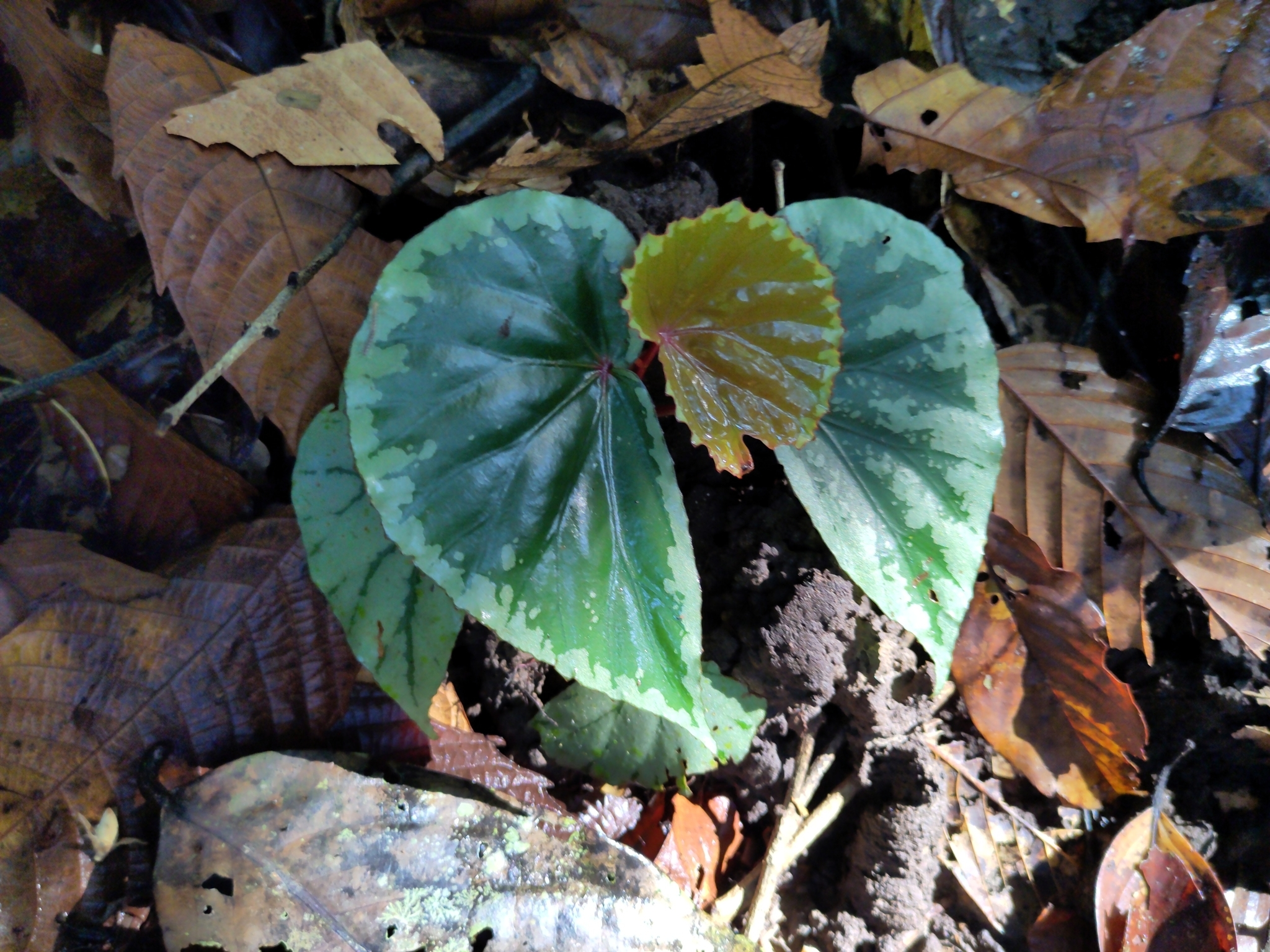

Scientific classification
- Kingdom: Plantae
- Clade: Tracheophytes
- Clade: Angiosperms
- Clade: Eudicots
- Clade: Rosids
- Order: Cucurbitales
- Family: Begoniaceae
- Genus: Begonia
- Species: B. prasinimarginata

Binomial name
- Begonia prasinimarginata S.Julia

= Begonia prasinimarginata =

Species of flowering plant

Begonia prasinimarginata is a species of Begonia found in the Danum Valley Conservation Area in Malaysian Borneo. It is named for the pale green border of its leaves (Latin prasinus "leek green").
