= 2013 Lahad Datu standoff =

Military conflict in Sabah, Malaysia

2013 Lahad Datu standoff Lahad Datu incursion Operation Daulat
- Part of the North Borneo dispute and cross border attacks in Sabah
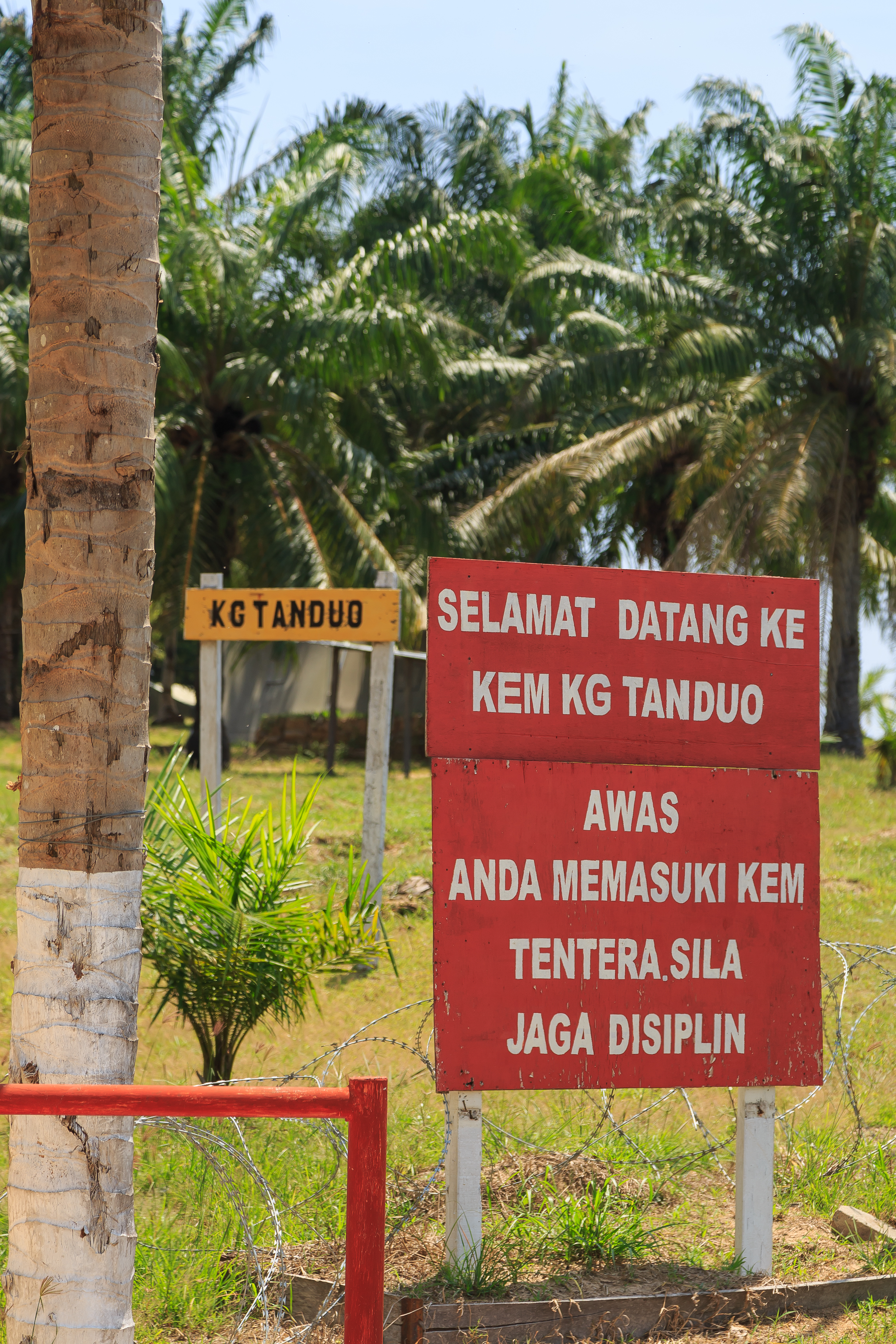
- The entrance to the first site of the standoff in Kampung Tanduo, now a Malaysian Army camp. The signboard reads (in Malay), "Welcome to the Tanduo Village Camp. Caution! You have entered a military camp. Please maintain your discipline!". Location map of the standoff
Date	11 February – 24 March 2013 (1 month, 1 week and 6 days)
Location	Kg. Tanduo, Lahad Datu as well as Semporna, Kunak and Tawau in eastern Sabah
Result	Malaysian victory
Territorial changes	Military operations replaced by ESSCOM and ESSZONE.; Those detained were charged under the Security Offences (Special Measures) Act 2012.; Thousands of illegal immigrants in Sabah repatriated.

Belligerents
(Sulu Sultanate) Sultanate of Sulu (Jamalul Kiram III's faction); Filipino illegal immigrants (non-combative); Supported by: Moro National Liberation Front (Misuari faction)	Malaysia; Sabahan local villagers Supported by: Philippines (Note: Supported Malaysian action during the standoff, but was not involved in the operation.)

Commanders and leaders
Jamalul Kiram III; Agbimuddin Kiram; Nur Misuari	Sultan Abdul Halim (Yang di-Pertuan Agong); Najib Razak (Prime Minister of Malaysia); Anifah Aman (Minister of Foreign Affairs); Zahid Hamidi (Minister of Defence); Ismail Omar (Chief of Royal Malaysia Police); Zulkifeli Mohd. Zin (Chief of Defence Forces); Musa Aman (Chief Minister of Sabah); Supported by: Benigno Aquino III (President of Philippines)

Units involved
Royal Forces of the Sultanate of Sulu and North Borneo	Royal Malaysia Police; PGK; Marine Police; UNGERIN; GOF; Malaysian Armed Forces; Malaysian Army; GGK; RMR; Royal Malaysian Navy; PASKAL; Royal Malaysian Air Force; PASKAU; Supported elements: Malaysian Maritime Enforcement Agency; Philippine elements: Philippine Navy; Philippines Coast Guard

Strength
235 militants (Filipino media claimed); 400 militants (Kiram claimed)	Malaysia strength ~6,500 armed forces 7 MAF battalions 1 GOF battalion 12 ACV-300 Adnan; 3 F/A-18 Hornet; 5 BAE Hawk 200; Philippine strength Six naval ships

Casualties and losses
56 killed; 3 wounded; 149 captured; 68 killed (Malaysian government claimed)	10 killed (1 non-combat casualty) (Note: One soldier was killed in traffic accident at Felda Sahabat on his way to send food to the Malaysian forces.); 12 wounded
- Civilian casualties; 6 killed; 1 wounded; 6 escaped (Note: Escaped from the intruders when they tried to take civilian as a hostage.); 564 arrested (Note: Majority arrested were illegal immigrants who gave help to the intruders.)
- All statistics reference: Note: All these total only during the standoff and does not include the total in any further actions.

The 2013 Lahad Datu standoff, also known as the Lahad Datu incursion or Operation Daulat (Malay: Operasi Daulat), was a military conflict in Lahad Datu, Malaysia. The conflict began on 11 February, when 235 militants arrived in Lahad Datu by boat, and ended on 24 March. The militants, self proclaimed as "Royal Security Forces of the Sultanate of Sulu and North Borneo", were sent by Jamalul Kiram III, a claimant to the throne of the Sultanate of Sulu.

The militants' stated objective was to assert the territorial claim of the Philippines to eastern Sabah. Malaysian security forces surrounded the village where the group had gathered. After weeks of negotiations and several deadlines for the group to withdraw, the killing of local policemen prompted Malaysian security forces to flush out the militants with a military operation. At the end of the standoff around 72 people were left dead, including 56 militants, 10 Malaysian security force personnel, and 6 civilians. The surviving militants were all either captured or escaped. 9 of the captured Filipino militants were sentenced to death for waging war against the Yang di-Pertuan Agong by the Court of Appeal of Malaysia in 2017, and have their death sentence upheld by the Federal Court of Malaysia in 2018. Even when Malaysia abolished mandatory death penalty in 2023, which allows all death row inmates to filed for a review on their death sentence to the Federal Court, the Federal Court in 2024 continue to uphold the death sentence for 7 out of the 9 Filipino militants (the other 2 Filipinos died while in prison).

The Lahad Datu incursion has had lasting impacts for the people of Sabah. Before this incursion, the government of Malaysia continued to pay an annual cession payment amounting to roughly $1,000 to the indirect heirs of the Sultan honoring an 1878 agreement, where North Borneo – today’s Sabah – was conceded by the late Sultan of Sulu to a British company. However, Malaysia suspended these payments in response to this attack that killed civilians and members of the Malaysian armed forces. In 2019, eight of these Sulu heirs, who insisted they were not involved in the standoff, hired lawyers to pursue legal action based on the original commercial deal. These litigations would later be known as the Malaysia Sulu case, which spanned across multiple jurisdictions in Europe such as Spain, France, Luxembourg and the Netherlands, as the purported Sulu heirs tried to enforce a seizure of roughly $14.9 billions of Malaysia's foreign assets through forum shopping. However, all attempts by the purported Sulu heirs were ultimately defeated by the Malaysian government and the seizure order was quashed by the courts in all four aforementioned European countries by November 2024. The case is still ongoing with claimants facing legal setbacks.

== Background ==
=== National territorial dispute ===
The Philippines retains a territorial claim to eastern Sabah, formerly known as North Borneo, through the heritage of the Sultanate of Sulu. The basis of this claim is that the dominion of the sultanate historically spanned from the Sulu Archipelago into parts of northern Borneo. In line with the International Court of Justice court decision in the case concerning sovereignty of Pulau Ligitan and Pulau Sipadan in 2002, Malaysia claimed that Sultan of Sulu indisputably relinquished the sovereign rights of all its possession in favour of Spain on 22 July 1878, hence relinquishing any claim to Sabah.

=== Sulu succession dispute ===
The unresolved status of the Sultanate of Sulu was a driving issue behind the standoff, with the militant group claiming Jamalul Kiram III as the legitimate Sultan of Sulu. The militant group claimed that Kiram's supposed role as Sultan justified their occupation, however, Kiram's status as sultan has been disputed by several other claimants to the sultanate.

== Initiation ==
Heirs to the sultanate felt excluded by the framework of a peace deal between the Philippine government and the Moro Islamic Liberation Front, as announced on 7 October 2012 by Philippine president Benigno Aquino III. In response, Jamalul Kiram III, claiming to be Sulu's legitimate heir, decreed on 11 November 2012 that a civilian and military contingent should assert his territorial rights in North Borneo. He appointed his brother and Raja Muda ("heir apparent" or "crown prince"), Agbimuddin Kiram, to lead the group.

Months later on 11 February 2013, Agbimuddin Kiram and at least 101 followers arrived in the village of Tanduo, located near Tungku in Lahad Datu from neighbouring Simunul island, Tawi-Tawi, in the southern Philippines. Around eighty people fled from 15 homes in Tanduo.

== Development ==
Malaysian police blocked roads leading from Lahad Datu to Tanduo. Malaysian police boats patrolled nearby waters. Filipino security agencies blocked off entry from the southern Philippines and deployed six naval ships to help stabilise the situation. An additional Philippine naval ship was sent to Malaysian waters off Lahad Datu to provide humanitarian assistance.

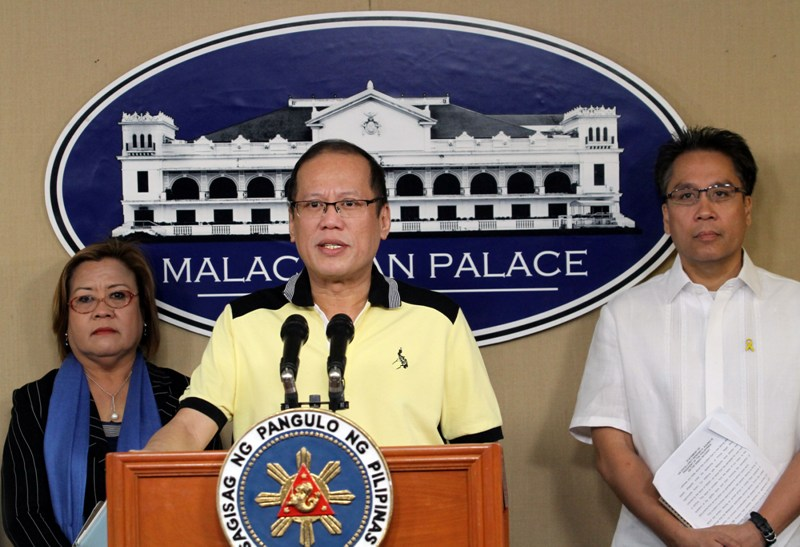
Philippine President Benigno Aquino III in Malacañang Palace on 26 February 2013 urging Jamalul Kiram III to withdraw his followers in Sabah. Also in the picture are Justice Secretary Leila de Lima (left) and Interior and Local Government Secretary Mar Roxas (right).

On 26 February 2013, President Aquino appealed to Kiram III to recall his followers and to hold discussions with the government to address his family's concerns. In a press conference held at Malacañang Palace, Aquino said that the longer Kiram's III followers stayed in Sabah, the more they endangered their own lives, but also the thousands of Filipinos living there. Addressing Kiram III, he said, "It must be clear to you that this small group of people will not succeed in addressing your grievances, and that there is no way that force can achieve your aims". Aquino reminded him that as a Filipino citizen, he was bound by the Constitution of the Philippines and its laws. The president said that he had ordered an investigation into possible violations of laws by Kiram III, his followers and collaborators. He cited the Constitution's provision on renouncing war as a policy instrument and Article 118 of the Revised Penal Code, which punishes those who "provoke or give occasion for a war...or expose Filipino citizens to reprisals on their persons or property". He said a dialogue to address the country's territorial dispute to eastern Sabah could be arranged after the standoff ended. Aquino declined to confirm reports of other parties allegedly behind the standoff to sabotage the Bangsamoro peace process. Aquino's statement was supported by Senator Kiko Pangilinan, who said:

This standoff has reached a critical point where the Philippine government must now act decisively and do what is necessary to protect the general interest of the Filipino people. Kiram is essentially declaring war on Malaysia. He must understand that it has never been a policy of the Philippines to take on other countries by force. Regardless of Sulu's rightful claim to Sabah, an armed invasion will unlikely lead to an amicable resolution. This has come at a time when we are so close to achieving lasting peace with our brothers from the South. Malaysia has played a crucial role in brokering talks between the Philippine government and our Muslim brothers in Mindanao. We cannot afford to have a wedge between our country and Malaysia because of one person's whim.

Kiram III remained defiant and said his men would not go back home "until an arrangement has been done by our officials and the president, and if that will be arranged accordingly with a written agreement signed by the parties concerned". He shared that in his last conversation with Agbimuddin, his brother told him that their followers were firm in their decision to stay in Sabah. The 74-year-old sultan said he was ready to be jailed if the Philippine government filed a case against him and members of his clan. He said he could not understand what his violation against the Constitution was, saying he had always respected it and that "coming home to their homeland" was not a crime. Kiram III asked Malaysia to "sit down in a square table and to diplomatically settle the issue on the claim" stressing the need to "come up with a win-win solution". He reiterated that he and his men "will not initiate the violence... But are prepared to defend our lives and aspirations" and that the Sabah issue "can be peacefully settled without threat, but in a diplomatic way". His daughter Sitti Jacel said her father's followers were not in Lahad Datu to wage war but to reside peacefully on their ancestral territory. She added that they would not leave without a solution. She expressed disappointment at the apparent lack of support from the Philippine government, adding that Manila needed to balance diplomatic relations and the interests of its constituents.

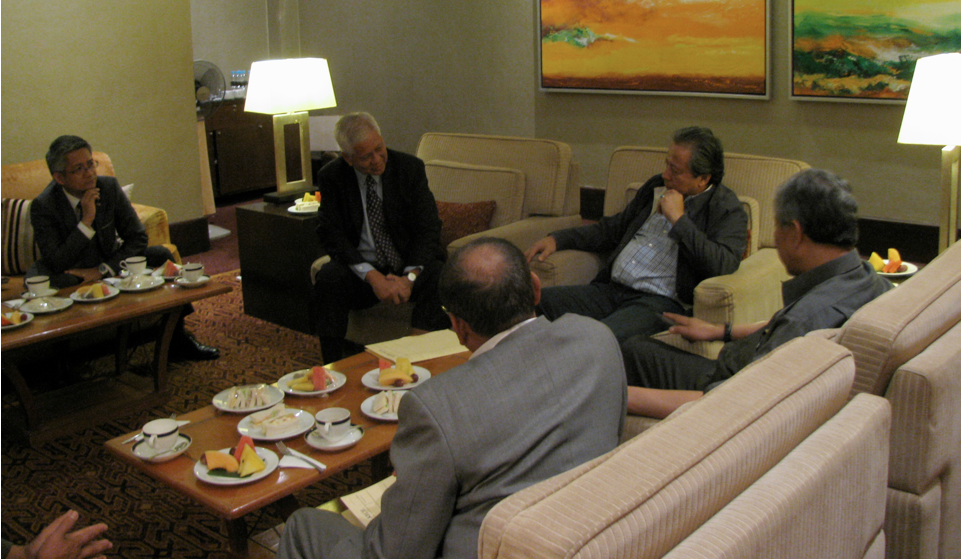
Philippines Secretary of Foreign Affairs meet with the Malaysian Foreign Minister and the Defence Minister to discuss peacefully on how to resolve the incident.

On 7 March 2013, the Malaysian Foreign Ministry issued a statement that said it considered Kiram's III forces as a group of terrorists "following their atrocities and brutalities committed in the killing of Malaysia's security personnel". It added that the label had the agreement of Philippine Foreign Affairs Secretary Albert Del Rosario. This was denied by the Philippine Ambassador to Malaysia, Jose Eduardo Malaya, who said Del Rosario was "taken out of context". It was clarified that Del Rosario agreed that those responsible for the killing of Malaysian police forces committed "terroristic acts".

== Military operations ==
Timeline of attacks

1 March:

- 10:15 – First shootout between the sultanate's forces and the police at the Tanduo village, two police officers and 12 sultanate's men killed.

3 March:

- 6:30 – Ambushed at the Semporna, killing six police officers and six terrorists also killed.

5 March:

- Military and police begun mopping-up operations codenamed "Ops Daulat".

11 March:

- Security forces end the siege on the Tanduo village.

24 March:

- Operation Daulat ended.

29 June:

- Eastern Sabah Security Command (ESSCOM) put in place security arrangements and undertake operations on the Ops Daulat area.
All times are UTC (UTC+8).

=== 1 March skirmish ===
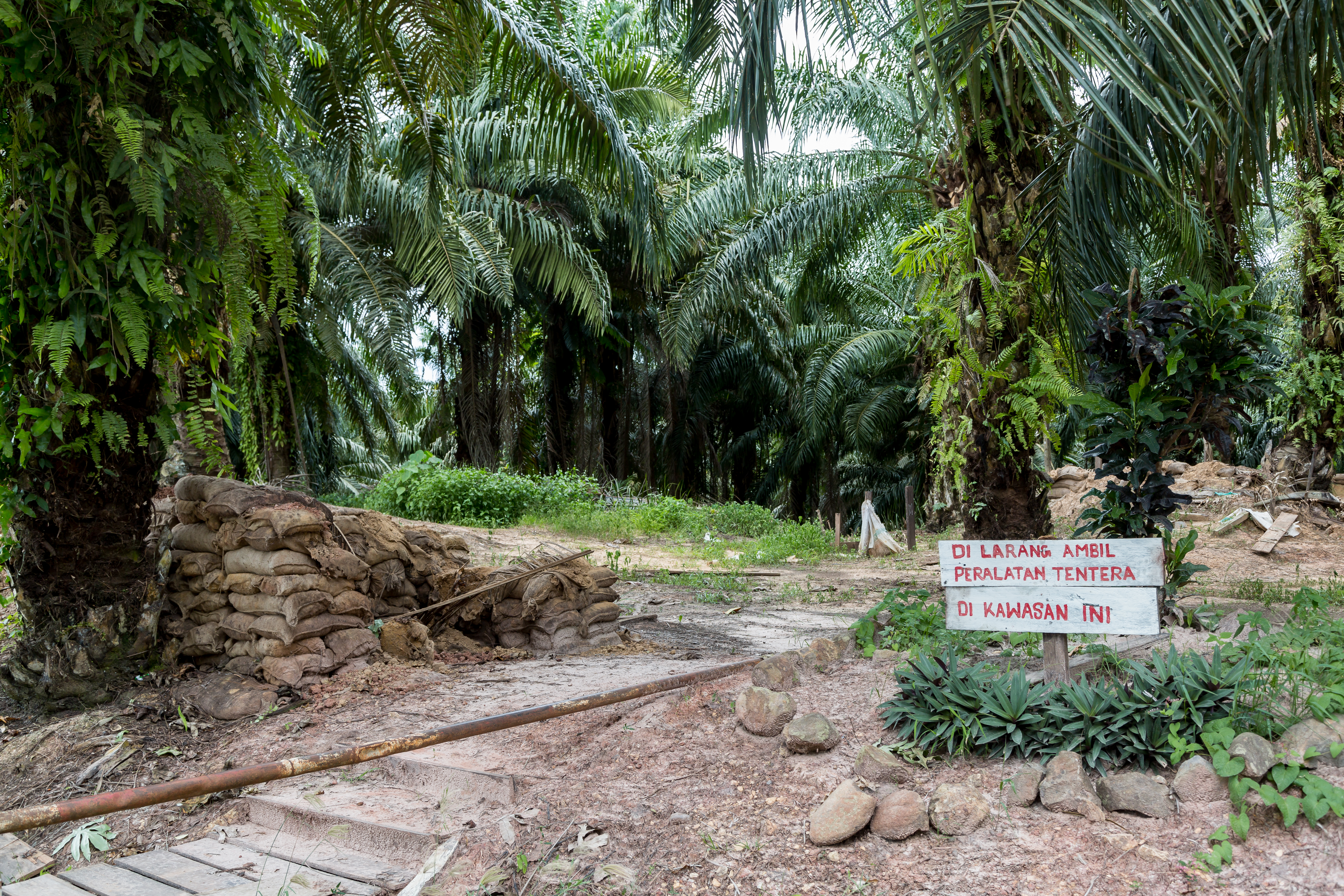
One of the locations where the shootout took place on a palm oil plantation, today the site had been transformed into a Malaysian Army controlled station.

At around 10:15 am on 1 March 2013, three days after Malaysia's extended deadline for the group to leave Lahad Datu, a confrontation occurred between the sultanate's forces and Malaysian police, with shots exchanged. According to Abraham Idjirani, Kiram's spokesperson, 10 army members were killed with four more injured. The Malaysian lost two casualties. The owner of the house where Agbimuddin Kiram and his men had stayed was killed in the exchange. Malaysian Home Minister Hishammuddin Hussein claimed that Kiram's men opened fire and denied that their security forces retaliated. Initial reports from the Malaysian embassy in the Philippines stated that no fatalities resulted.

Ambassador Mohammad Zamri bin Mohammad Kassim told Philippine Foreign Affairs Secretary Albert Del Rosario that the "standoff was over" and that 10 "royal army" members had surrendered to Malaysian authorities after the assault. He added that members of Kiram's group had escaped and ran towards the sea, pursued by the police. Idjirani responded that none of their members were in Malaysian custody. He denied that their forces fled after the clash. He said "the standoff is not over, unless there's a concrete understanding or agreement that can be reached".

Idjirani claimed that Malaysian officials wanted "to cover up the truth" when they claimed that no one was hurt in the incident. He appealed to the Malaysian government to stop the attack, saying Kiram's men were primarily armed only with bolos and knives and only a few handguns. He claimed that snipers from the Malaysian police were targeting their group. He added that the sultanate was looking at the possibility of elevating the matter to the Organisation of Islamic Cooperation and the United Nations Human Rights Commission. He said that their men had moved to another location to continue their fight and urged Malaysia to hold talks.

Sabah Police Commissioner Hamza Taib meanwhile said no one surrendered. He added that 12 men from Kiram's group were killed when they tried to break the security cordon imposed. Hamza claimed that the Filipinos opened fire at the Malaysian police who were forced to fire in self-defence. He said they found various weapons, including M16 rifles, pistols and SLR rifles and ammunition from the group. He said Agbimuddin's group were still in Tanduo and that the security cordon was holding because Malaysia wanted the occupation to be resolved peacefully.

Malaysian Prime Minister Najib Razak later confirmed that two police officers, identified as Inspector Zulkifli Bin Mamat and Corporal Sabaruddin Bin Daud from 69 Commandos, had been killed. The Sabah police commissioner, in a separate statement, said that 12 of Kiram's followers died. Najib said he had given Malaysian security forces a mandate to take "any action" against the group. Najib added that "no compromise" was acceptable and that "either they surrender or face the consequences".

=== Armed men in Kunak ===
On 2 March 2013, a group of 10 armed men were spotted near Kunak, a district between Lahad Datu and Semporna, according to Royal Malaysia Police Inspector-General Ismail Omar. He said that three were in military fatigues similar to those being worn by the sultanate's forces. The Malaysian government doubled the number of police and army officers, deploying members of the Royal Malay Regiment, in areas where the sultanate's armed supporters were believed to be present.

=== Semporna attack ===
At around 6:30 am on 3 March 2013, fewer than 10 gunmen, claiming to be from the Sulu Sultanate, ambushed the police during a surveillance operation on a village off the coast of Semporna. The Bukit Aman special branch superintendent and four operatives were killed in the action. The police party remained trapped in the village surrounded by the attackers. The superintendent had led three dozen policemen, from the Semporna District Police Headquarters, after having been ordered to investigate following a tip-off that a group of armed men were at Kampung Sri Jaya Siminul in Semporna District. The operation was launched at 4 pm on Saturday, following intelligence reports of the existence of a firearms cache in the village, and that an uprising by groups of villagers believed to be of Philippines origin residing there was in the making.

About three hours into the operation, the police were fired upon while heading towards a house in the village and returned fire. The superintendent was killed during the ambush. Sabah police commissioner DCP Datuk Hamza Taib had said on Saturday that the attack may not be related to the Kampung Tanduo standoff. During the ambush, two gunmen were killed. Idjirani, the secretary-general of Sultan Kiram III, said the violence started when Malaysian policemen, while pretending to round up undocumented Filipinos, shot Imam Maas and his four sons. Another imam was allegedly shot when Malaysian authorities learned that they were taking care of the sultan's relatives in the area. Police investigations found that Kampung Simunul, Semporna, had been infiltrated by the Sulu intruders who mingled with the inhabitants, one of whom was regarded as an 'imam'. It was earlier reported that the intruders had planned to attack Lahad Datu police station and that both Lahad Datu and Tawau Police Special Investigation Divisions had been deployed to the scene.

During the shootout, 23 police officers were pronounced missing. While captive, four policemen were tortured and mutilated, with one beheaded, according to Malaysian authorities who later found the bodies. The mutilated condition of these bodies led the major Malay-language newspaper Utusan Malaysia to allege the influence of drugs or black magic. Reports stated that six Malaysian police officers and seven assailants were killed in Semporna. Six of the attackers were fatally shot while ambushing Malaysian police, while another was beaten to death by villagers after he tried to take a hostage, according to Sabah's head of police.

=== Operation Daulat ===
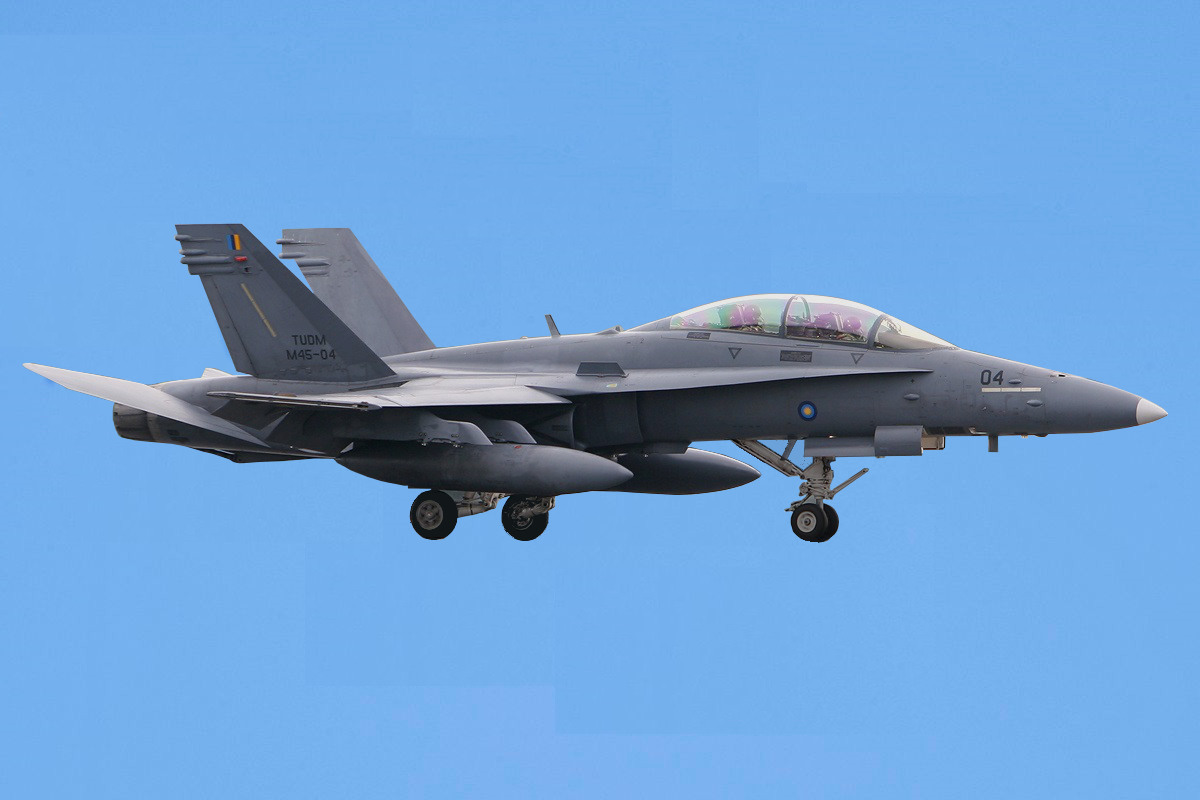
An American-made F/A-18, one of the jet fighters used by the Royal Malaysian Air Force during the operation.

On 5 March 2013, Royal Malaysian Air Force fighter jets, reported as F/A-18 and Hawk fighters, bombed the Kiram hide-out. Explosions were heard in Lahad Datu as the Malaysian forces moved against the gunmen.

At around 11:00am in a Kuala Lumpur rally, Prime Minister Najib Razak delivered the following speech:

I wish to inform you about the latest news that, at around 10am just now, Malaysian security forces has launched a large-scale operation to crush the intruders at Lahad Datu.

The operation started with air strike by the fighter jets of Royal Malaysian Air Force, followed by mortar strike. At this exact moment as I'm speaking here, the army and police forces in armoured vehicles, along with other members (of the security forces) following behind the armoured vehicles, are taking action to arrest and destroy the group which has breached our nation's sovereignty.

I wish to address that, at the initial stage, our only intention is to avoid spilling even a single drop of blood on the soil of Sabah, whether amongst the people of Malaysia, or amongst the group that has intruded into our country. However, I feel deeply disappointed when our good will and sincere intention was responded with acts of shooting and killing, in an extremely cruel manner, against our police forces.

Therefore, as the Head of Government, I have made a decision: The time for us to give any further consideration has ended, and we need to respond with all our strengths we have!

Because in the matters of sovereignty, in the matters of peace in our country, we will not let even one inch of Malaysian soil be threatened or tarnished by anybody.

— Najib Razak, Prime Minister of Malaysia

According to IGP Ismail Omar and other police sources, the army and police began mopping-up operations codenamed "Ops Sulu" and "Ops Daulat" (Operation Sovereignty). It was believed that Kiram and several of his followers had escaped the security cordon. A search was carried out in the surrounding farmland and FELDA plantations. The Malaysian troops recovered 13 bodies of suspected Kiram followers in Felda Sahabat.

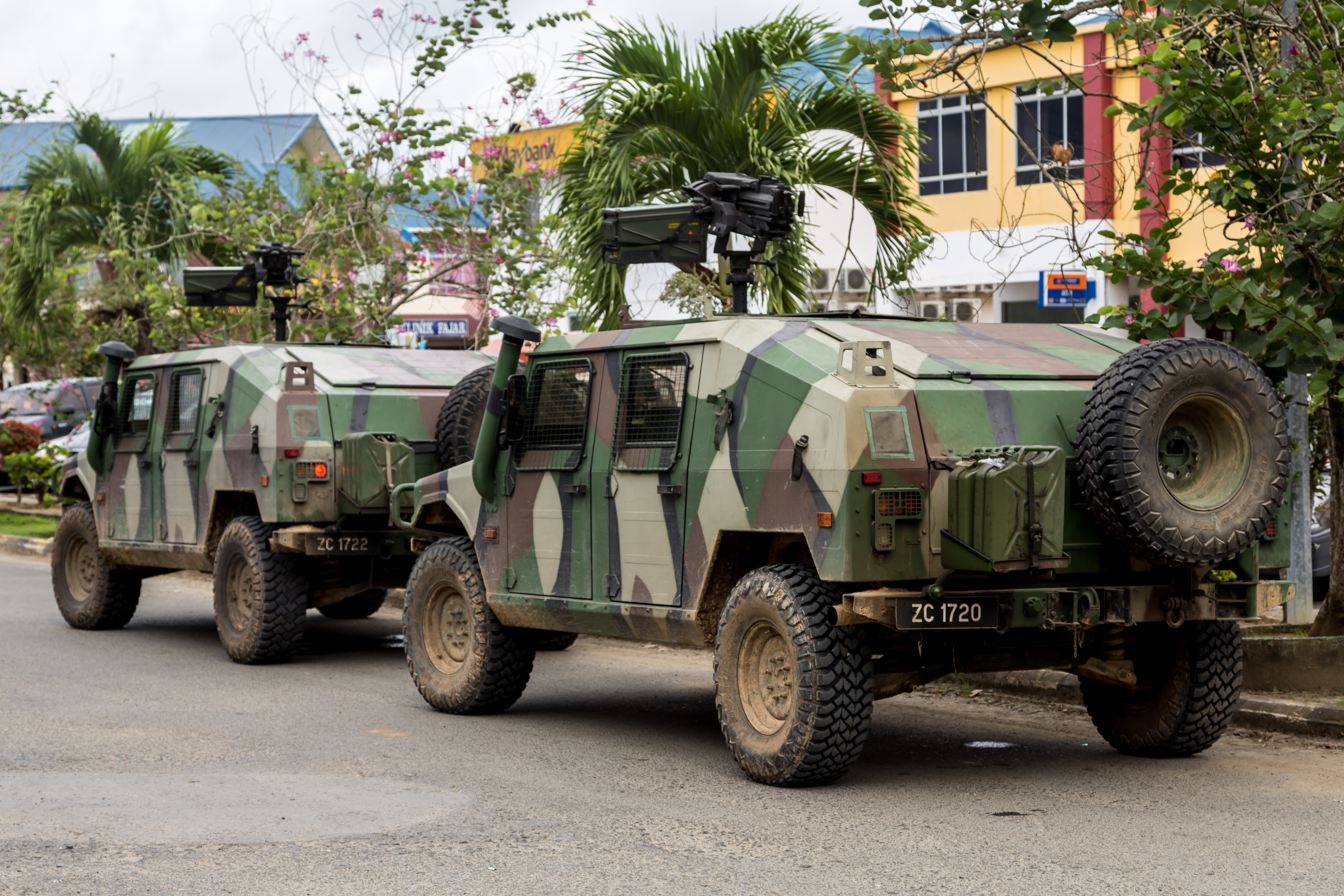
The presence of additional Malaysian Army armoured vehicles such as URO VAMTAC in a town near the conflict area five months later to increase the security in eastern Sabah.

On 9 March 2013, Malaysian Home Minister Hishammuddin Hussein said that Ops Daulat would end when no intruders were left. Malaysian security forces maintained security cordons around the operation area and those with no documents such as MyKad were detained.

Tanduo village was declared secured on 11 March and the bodies of 22 Sulu gunmen were recovered. Security forces swept a neighbouring village that left a Malaysian soldier dead. Private Ahmad Hurairah Ismail was killed along with three Sulu gunmen. Another soldier, Private Ahmad Farhan Ruslan was killed in a road accident near Bandar Cendera-Wasih in a logistics convoy.

The clash ended on 24 March, while Operation Daulat was replaced by the Eastern Sabah Security Command (ESSCOM) on 29 June. Sabah Chief Minister, Datuk Seri Musa Aman said ESSCOM became responsible to enforce security arrangements.

== Related incidents ==
=== Defacement of Malaysian and Philippine websites ===
On 3 March 2013, the Globe Telecom website was defaced by hackers claiming to be from the "MALAYSIA Cyb3r 4rmy". The group left the message, "Do not invade our country or you will suffer the consequences". Global Telecom confirmed the hack, but claimed that no sensitive information was stolen. The website was up again by noon.

In apparent retaliation, hackers identifying themselves as from Anonymous Philippines, attacked several Malaysian websites. They warned Malaysia to "Stop attacking our cyber space! Or else we will attack your cyber world!" The website of Stamford College in Malaysia was hacked with its front page replaced by a note that said: "The time has come to reclaim what is truly ours. Sabah is owned by the Philippines, you illegally [sic] claiming it".

=== Google search results alteration ===
On 4 March 2013, a Google search for the word "Sabah" reflected a cached version of the territory's Wikipedia article. It said the Malaysian control of the state is "illegitimate" and that "in fact, [Sabah] is part of the Sultanate of Sulu". A spokesman for Google Malaysia said they knew of the issue.

=== Protests at the Malaysian embassy ===
Twenty Filipinos protested in front of the Malaysian embassy in Makati on 5 March. They called for an end to the violence, while some expressed support for the cause of Kiram. At least 50 policemen and a fire truck were deployed. The Malaysian embassy later suspended operations in response.

=== Allegations of political motives ===
Razak sought to assess whether opposition leader Anwar Ibrahim was involved. This began after Filipino media reported that Anwar might be involved with the incursion and an image of him with Nur Misuari of MNLF began circulating. Concurrently, Anwar launched legal proceedings against government-owned newspaper Utusan Malaysia and television station TV3 for trying to link him to the incursions. Meanwhile, Malaysian People's Justice Party (PKR) vice-president Tian Chua claimed that the ruling United Malays National Organisation (UMNO) had deliberately orchestrated the crisis to frighten the people of Sabah into favouring the ruling coalition. Chua's allegations were met with an outcry by the Malaysian public; citizens and personalities such as Ambiga Sreenevasan and Saifuddin Abdullah called for both parties to forge a bi-partisan consensus to settle the issue.

On the eve of its 2013 general election, Filipino senatorial candidates from the opposition blamed President Aquino for sending unclear messages to the Kiram family. They added that the President was in danger of facing an impeachment for "betrayal of public trust". Meanwhile, President Aquino blamed unnamed members of the previous Gloria Macapagal Arroyo government as conspirators; while Aquino did not name anyone due to lack of evidence. Kiram's daughter Princess Jacel challenged Aquino to prove his allegations. Former National Security Adviser Norberto Gonzales denied that he was the one Aquino was accusing. Jamalul Kiram III unsuccessfully ran for senator under Arroyo's TEAM Unity during the 2007 Senate Elections.

=== Use of commercial aircraft by the Malaysian Army ===
On 5 March, flights of AirAsia were used to transport Malaysian troops to Sabah. An online debate ensued over whether the move highlighted patriotism of a Malaysian-based airline or the military's lack of resources. Some Malaysians wondered why the government did not mobilise its fleet of C-130 Hercules transport planes. Others lauded AirAsia for its efforts in assistance. The Defence Ministry stated that it used AirAsia was simply expedient. Malaysian defence minister Zahid Hamidi pointed out that each RMAF C-130 Hercules was capable of carrying only 90 soldiers each, while AirAsia had jets capable of transporting up to 200 soldiers each. The Malaysian Defence Ministry pointed out that chartering civilian jetliners is a common practice in other countries, including those of NATO.

=== Assembly at the Philippine embassy ===
On 8 March 2013, Malaysians assembled outside the Philippine embassy in Kuala Lumpur. The event, called Ops Bunga (Operation Flower), encouraged participants to place flowers at the embassy's doorstep as a show of the Malaysian public's solidarity towards Filipinos in Malaysia. Organisers also urged people to offer prayers to the Malaysian security officers who died in the conflict.

=== Allegations of police brutality ===
On 10 March 2013, reports of police brutality by Malaysian police officials emerged over a crackdown on suspected Kiram III supporters, causing a mass migration of Filipinos from Sabah to Sulu. One refugee stated that Malaysian police had shot and killed many Filipino civilians irrespective of their MyKad status and detained many others. It was stated that those detained were not treated properly. A Royal Malaysian Police official denied the allegations.

==== MNLF reactions to police brutality ====
A report on News5 claimed that some Moro National Liberation Front (MNLF) members were undergoing training in Jolo, Sulu for a rescue mission for abused Filipinos in Sabah. Former MNLF leader Nur Misuari claimed that these MNLF members were not part of or allied with the Sulu Royal Security Force. Sulu Province governor, Abdusakur Tan denied reports that MNLF fighters under Nur Misuari were heading to Sabah. He also denied that 1,000 MNLF fighters had been able to sneak into the state. According to MNLF chairman Muslimin Sema they respected the decision of Sabah to join Malaysia in 1963. He also said he had visited Sabah in 1973 and witnessed the people's enthusiasm, adding that he had many relatives there.

== Aftermath ==
=== Arrest and prosecution ===
After Operation Daulat was launched, 443 individuals were held for various offences while 121 were held under the Security Offences (Special Measures) Act 2012 (SOSMA). The total number arrested under SOSMA later decreased to 104, mostly Filipinos who were suspected of having links to Kiram III. These included family members of Kiram III who had entered the state of Sabah using assumed identities. 149 Sulu gunmen were arrested and eight were charged with waging war against the King, a charge that carried the death penalty in Malaysia.

On 6 August 2013, the Kota Kinabalu High Court convicted Corporal Hassan Ali Basari, a Malaysian Special Branch officer, of intentionally withholding information about the intrusion of Sulu gunmen at Lahad Datu between January and March 2013. The Malaysian Special Branch is the country's main internal security and domestic intelligence agency. The prosecution successfully argued that Hassan's intention not to inform his superiors resulted in casualties and fatalities on the Malaysian side. Hassan was sentenced to seven years of imprisonment, the maximum permitted jail term.

=== Burials ===
In 2013 during the ensuing conflict, Malaysian authorities announced that deceased militants would be buried in the state if their bodies were not claimed by their relatives, in compliance with the Geneva Conventions.

=== Death of Kiram III ===
On 20 October 2013, Jamalul Kiram III died of multiple organ failure in Simunul, Tawi-Tawi, Philippines. His family stated that they would continue their main objective to reclaim Sabah. The Royal Malaysia Police in Sabah responded by stating that they "would continue to be alert for any intrusion".

On 13 January 2015, Agbimuddin Kiram – who led the group to invade Sabah under the instruction of the late Jamalul Kiram III – died of cardiac arrest in Tawi-Tawi where he had been in hiding.

=== Trial ===
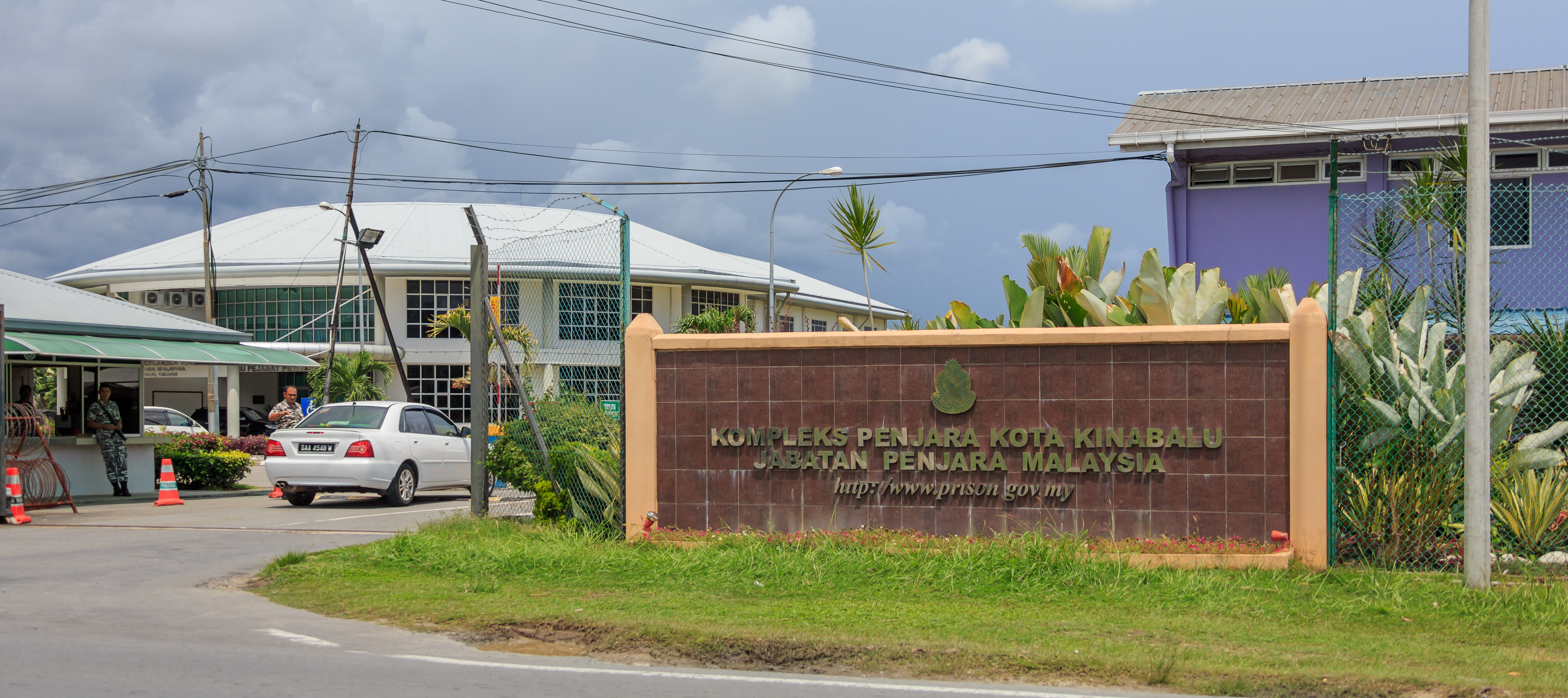
The Prison Complex in Kepayan.

On 6 January 2014, 30 individuals (27 Filipinos and three Malaysians) were brought to trial and charged with waging war against the King, harbouring terrorists, joining a terrorist group, and recruiting terrorists. Proceedings began at Kota Kinabalu Central Prison in Kepayan, where the charges were read in English, Malay and Suluk. Among those prosecuted were Kiram III's nephew, Datu Amir Bahar Hushin Kiram, who abandoned his men in Tanduo but was caught by Malaysian security forces hiding in the swamps around Semporna.

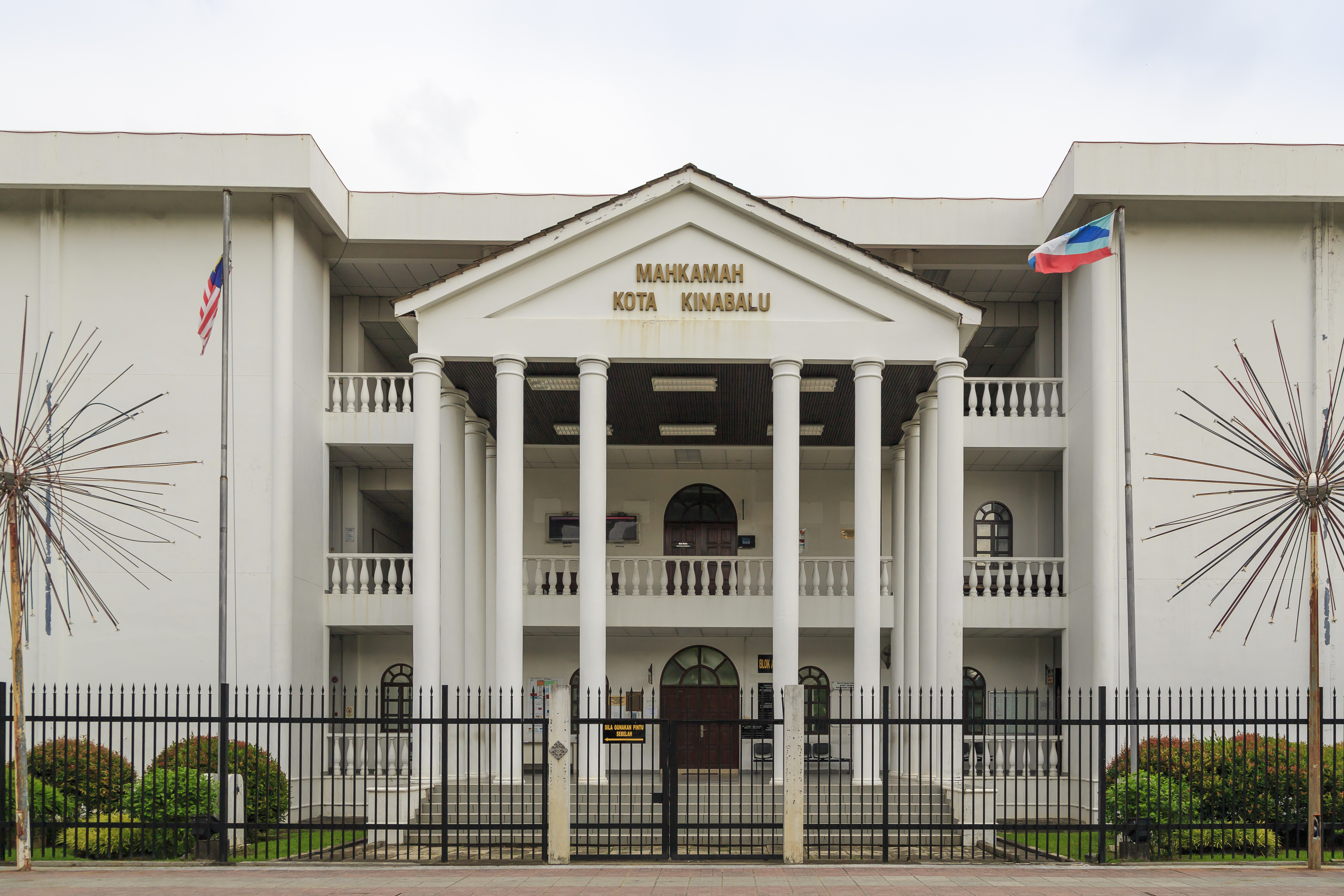
The high court in Kota Kinabalu.

On 5 February 2016, 19 of the 30 were ordered to enter their defence in the High Court of Kota Kinabalu. Justice Stephen Chung made the ruling after finding that the prosecution had succeeded in establishing a prima facie case against them: 16 Filipinos (including one woman) and three local men. Nine of the 16 Filipinos: Atik Hussin Abu Bakar, Basad H. Manuel, Ismail Yasin, Virgilio Nemar Patulada, Mohammad Alam Patulada, Salib Akhmad Emali, Al Wazir Osman, Abdul, Tani Lahaddahi, Julham Rashid and Datu Amir Bahar Hushin Kiram were alleged to have waged war against the King, a capital offence.

Six Filipinos, Lin Mad Salleh, Holland Kalbi, Habil Suhaili, Timhar Hadir, Aiman Radie and a Malaysian man, Abdul Hadi Mawan were accused of being a member in a terrorist group, which was punishable with life imprisonment and fine. The sole Filipina Norhaida Ibnahi was ordered to enter her defence for allegedly wilfully harbouring individuals she knew to be members of a terrorist group, which was punishable with 20 years to life imprisonment and fine, or both. Local Mohamad Ali Ahmad and Filipino Basil Samiul were acquitted of waging war and of membership in a terrorist group, but were later charged with soliciting or supporting a terrorist group, to which they pleaded not guilty. The new charge was made after Justice Chung found the prosecution had shown evidence that they had solicited or given support to a terrorist group, punishable with life imprisonment or a fine. Another Malaysian named Pabblo Alie was charged with soliciting support for a terrorist group, an offence punishable with up to 30 years imprisonment and a fine.

On 23 February 2016, six of the Filipinos pleaded guilty to being a member of the terrorist group involved in the intrusion: Atik Hussin Abu Bakar, Lin Mad Salleh, Holland Kalbi, Basad H. Manuel, Ismail Yasin and Virgilio Nemar Patulada @ Mohammad Alam Patulada. Another three, Aiman Radie and Malaysians Pablo Alie and Mohamad Ali Ahmad, all Filipinos, also pleaded guilty. On 23 April, one of the Filipino accused, Habil Suhaili died from an asthma attack in the Queen Elizabeth Hospital. It was reported that he had been ill throughout the trial.

On 25 July 2016, the court found that nine Filipino militants who led the intrusion could face the death penalty: Atik Hussin Abu Bakar, Basad H. Manuel, Ismail Yasin, Virgilio Nemar Patulada, Mohammad Alam Patulada, Salib Akhmad Emali, Al Wazir Osman, Tani Lahaddahi, Julham Rashid and Datu Amir Bahar Hushin Kiram. All were spared by the court and given life sentences instead, as the court found no evidence that they were directly involved in the skirmishes, nor was there proof that they had killed any member of the security force or injured anybody. Others found guilty were local Abdul Hadi Mawan, Filipino Timhar Habil, Habil Suhaili (deceased during trial) and a sole Filipina, Norhaida Ibnahi bringing the total to 13.

On 8 June 2017, following the appeal by prosecutors to upgrade nine of the convicted's life sentences to death penalty, the Malaysian Court of Appeal sentenced them to death. The judges said the men had meticulously planned the incursion, stating that:

The nine accused were part of a conspiracy hatched across the border to wage war against the Government of Malaysia and/or the King, with intent to weaken the country from within so that they could reclaim Sabah. [...] In short, this was an attack by a foreign enemy which is unprecedented in Malaysian history. [...] It should therefore attract the ultimate penalty of death. [...] For the foregoing reasons, we allowed the prosecution’s appeal and set aside the sentence of life imprisonment passed by the learned judge and substituted it with the death penalty. Order accordingly.

— PP v. Kadir Uyung & Anor and Other Cases, [2017] 2 SSLR 580

On 15 January 2018, the highest court in Malaysia, the Federal Court rejected their appeal and upheld their death sentence.

After the passing of the Abolition of Mandatory Death Penalty Act 2023 [Act 846] and Revision of Sentence of Death and Imprisonment for Natural Life (Temporary Jurisdiction of the Federal Court) Act 2023 [Act 847], seven of the nine Filipinos who were sentenced to death filed for a review on their death sentence, but their application was unanimously rejected by the Federal Court of Malaysia on 2 October 2024. The two other Filipinos, Ismail Yasin and Salib Akhmad Emali, were unable to apply for a review on their death sentence as they had died in prison.

=== Repercussions ===
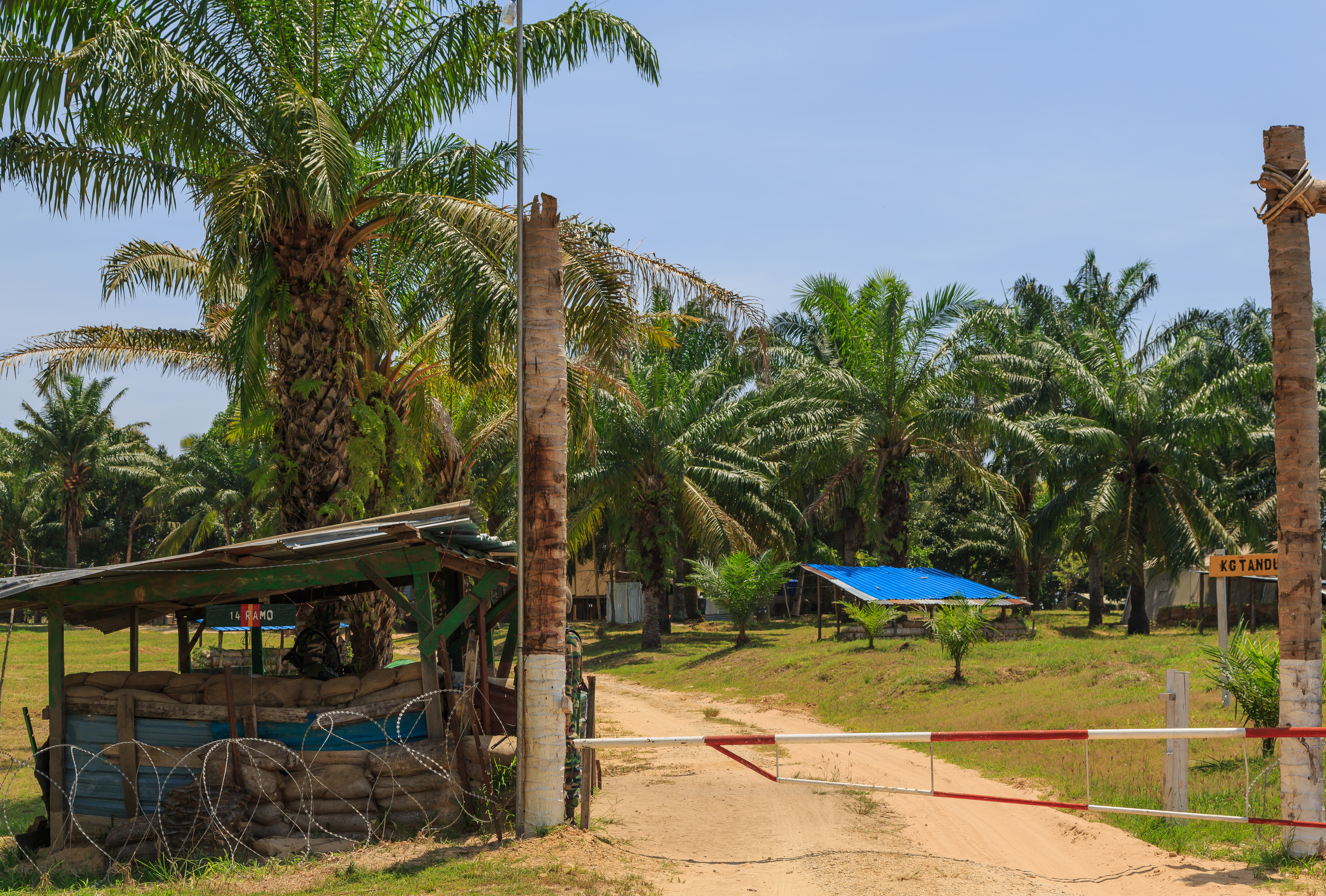
Entrance to Kampung Tanduo after its transformation into a Malaysian Army camp and headquarters in 2014.

Thousands of Filipinos who had illegally resided in Malaysia, some for decades, were deported following the conflict and ensuing security-related crackdown. Some of these were forced to leave family members behind. From January to November 2013, a total of nine thousand Filipinos were repatriated from Sabah, a number that increased to over twenty-six thousand during 2014. Many overseas Filipinos who remained subsequently faced discrimination. They became possible targets for retaliation, especially from the local Bornean tribes, because the Malaysian police officers were mainly indigenous Borneans.

=== Further arrests and the killing of more Sulu militants ===
On 22 April 2014, a 57-year-old man in Lahad Datu who claimed to have been given the power to manage the Suluk people in Sabah was arrested for displaying the Sulu Sultanate flag at his home. Later on 25 June, six suspected Sulu terrorists were arrested and their weapons seized in Kunak. Membership cards, appointment letters by the Sulu sultanate, and documents linked to the sultanate were discovered. It was later revealed that one of a suspect who was a police corporal, had family ties in the southern Philippines. These suspects had allegedly drawn up plans to form an "army" of terrorists, with plans to mount another incursion and may have been linked to the recent kidnappings in eastern Sabah. On 22 July, three people — a Bajau, a Suluk, and one Filipino illegal immigrant — were held for joining a bid to claim Sabah for the Sulu sultanate. The three were believed to have been recruiting new members.

On 30 October 2014, two men identified as the members of the Sulu militants were shot dead by police in Penampang. Both suspects had committed robberies to raise funds for their activities and tried to recruit new members.

=== Naturalised locals involvement ===
On 6 May 2015, Minister in the Prime Minister's Department Shahidan Kassim said some locals together with Filipino illegal immigrants had provided information to intruders during the invasion of Lahad Datu and other incidents. He stated:

Many locals in the east coast of Sabah originated from the Philippines and, therefore, had family or economic ties with their counterparts there. This [locals] have played a part in the intrusion in the east coast of Sabah, abductions and cross border crimes prior to the establishment of ESSCOM and ESSZONE. As a counter-measure, we will try to instill in their mindset that this is our country where we make our living together, where our children are studying and where their future lies, adding that the effort to defend the country was a collective effort.

=== Economic impacts ===
The 2013 attack affected trade relations, especially with the Philippines side of Tawi-Tawi where most of goods came from Sabah. In 2015, the Malaysian police proposed to ban the activities. This was opposed by their Philippine counterparts. The ban came into effect in 2016 with majority support from Sabahan residents. The ban was removed in 2017 following the increase of security from the Filipino side. Despite the return of barter activity, Sabah maintained they would remain cautious on trade.

=== Malaysian politician meeting with Jacel Kiram ===
On 9 November 2015, the allegation of political motives towards one of the Malaysian opposition parties behind the incursion was strengthened when the daughter of de facto leader of the Malaysian People's Justice Party (PKR) Nurul Izzah Anwar was seen taking a selfie with Jacel Kiram holding a poster stating "#Release Anwar immediately". Izzah claimed that she and Tian Chua were invited to meet with stakeholders from the Philippines, adding that they also met other Filipino politicians such as Hermilando Mandanas and Regina Reyes. She emphasized her support for Malaysian government initiatives in peace negotiations in southern Philippines, as well defending Sabah's sovereignty as part of the Malaysian federation. Her intention was however still questioned from various Sabahan politicians and residents. One Sabahan politician said:

As an MP [Member of parliament] in Malaysia, if she was caring for Malaysians and Sabah residents, we would welcome it. But if there is "something deeper" in the meeting, we want her to explain and it should be brought to Parliament.

The Malaysian government considered referring Izzah to the Parliament to assess the possibility of an illicit deal. She was banned from entering the states of Sabah and neighbouring Sarawak on the grounds of failing to show sensitivity.

On 22 November 2015, Izzah filed a defamation lawsuit against Malaysian Inspector Police Chief Khalid Abu Bakar and Rural and Regional Development Minister Ismail Sabri Yaakob. On 18 April 2018, Izzah won the case and they were ordered to pay Izzah RM1 million for all the damages made towards her reputation.

=== Sulu militants arms discovery ===
On 4 January 2016, a team of 15-General Operations Force (GOF) members led by two officers discovered a weapons cache comprising two M14 rifles, one Uzi machine pistol, three Colt .45 pistols, one revolver, a pair of handcuffs and 173 bullets of different calibres in Lahad Datu following a tip from local villagers while the team was conducting an operation in the area. The weapons were believed to have been buried by surviving militants before they fled back to the Philippines.

=== Honours ===
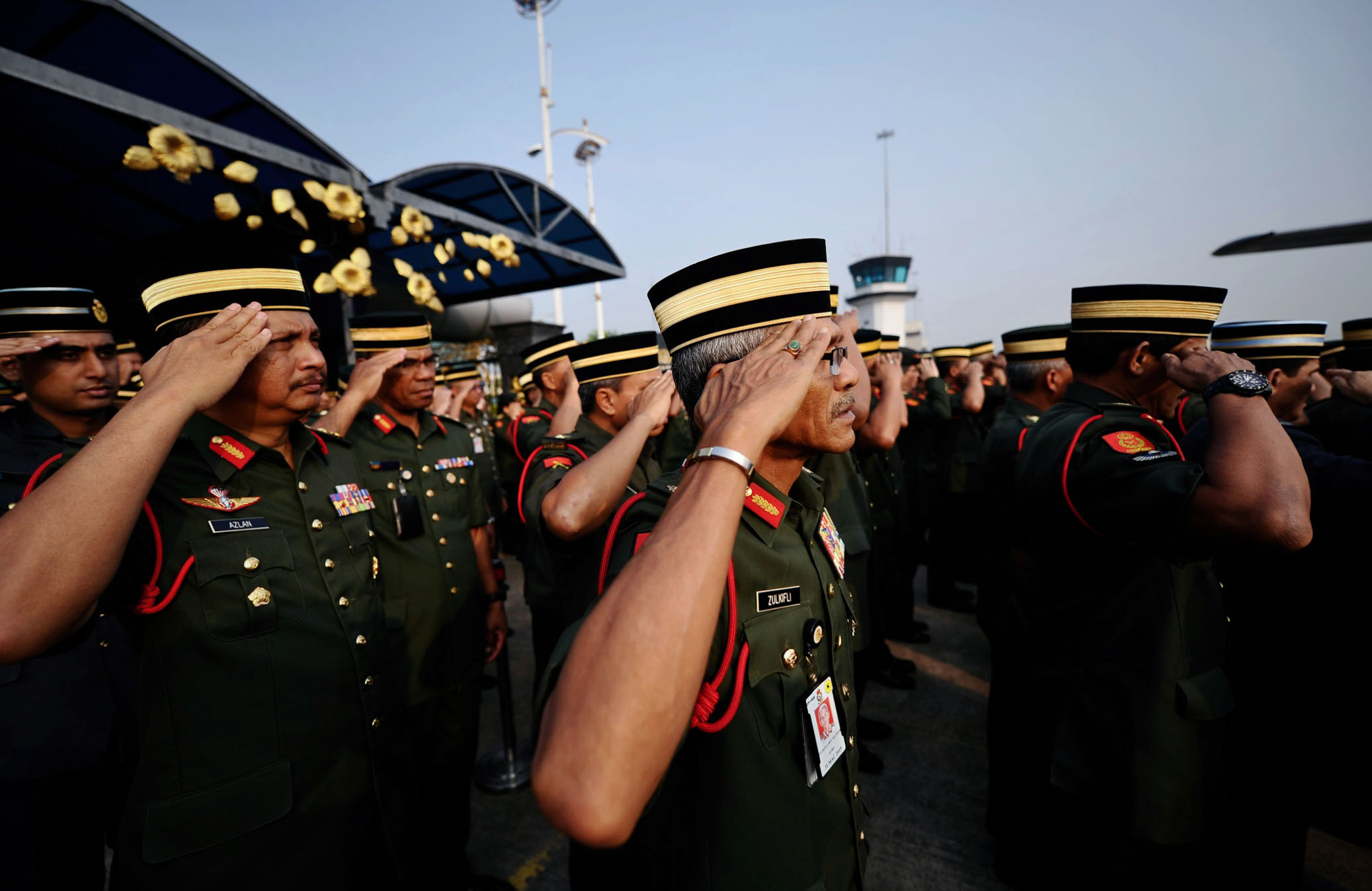
Malaysian officers pay their respects to fallen comrades, Privates Ahmad Hurairah Ismail and Ahmad Farhan Ruslan, at Subang Air Force Base.

On 11 August 2017, the Malaysian Armed Forces (MAF) held the 'Daulat Feb 2013' Battle Honour parade and award presentation ceremony at the Merdeka Square, Kota Kinabalu to honour the soldiers who died in the line of duty. The award was bestowed on 24 teams for their sincerity, efficiency and perseverance. Defence Minister Hishammuddin Hussein presented the 'Pingat Kedaulatan Negara' (PKN) to 61 MAF officers and personnel.

== Reactions ==
=== Supranational bodies ===
- United Nations – UN Secretary-General Ban Ki-moon called for an end to the conflict. He urged all sides to engage in dialogue to resolve the situation peacefully. On 8 March 2013, Ban met with Hussein Haniff, the Malaysian Permanent Representative to the United Nations on the conflict. A statement from the UN Secretariat said that the Secretary-General "reiterated his hope that the situation will be resolved as soon as possible and that efforts will continue to be made to ensure that human rights will be respected and loss of life will be prevented."

=== States ===
- Brunei – The Major General of Royal Brunei Armed Forces Aminuddin Ihsan conveyed his hope that the Sabah crisis would be resolved peacefully.
- Indonesia – President Susilo Bambang Yudhoyono urged a diplomatic solution. He said "I will pursue a diplomatic approach in the near future, because it's bad (if the incident prolongs). (But) it does not mean that Indonesia will intervene in Malaysia's internal affairs."
- United States – US Ambassador to the Philippines Harry K. Thomas, Jr. said that Manila and Kuala Lumpur have the ability "to work this out in a peaceful manner, according to international norms." He also added that if the two governments would sit down and talk, the standoff could be resolved without bloodshed. The United States welcomed the signing of the Bangsamoro Framework Agreement.

=== Non-state actors ===
- Other claimants to the Sultanate:
  - Muedzul Lail Tan Kiram decried the actions of his relatives and what he claimed are "false pretenders to the throne"
  - Fuad Kiram expressed his disapproval of the actions of cousin Kiram III. He said he wants the retaking of Sabah done "by peaceful means and by peaceful coexistence with others." He offered his prayers for the safety of the people who are in Lahad Datu.
  - Abdul Rajak Aliuddin opposed the claims of Kiram III and his supporters, stating that his own family "is the rightful owner of the throne." He claimed to be the sixth Sultan of North Borneo.
  - Mohd Akjan Ali Muhammad called on all the Suluk people in Sabah to avoid the conflict. He stressed that he is the rightful heir to the Sulu Sultanate and remind all the Suluks community that they are Malaysian citizens and have no links with the intruders from the Philippines.
- The International Union of Socialist Youth (IUSY) in its 2013 World Council called for a consultative process to resolve the conflict, and supported the self-determination rights of Sabahans.
- Moro Islamic Liberation Front – Its chairman, Murad Ibrahim, asserted that MILF was not involved with the conflict. He mentioned that the issue was a matter to be resolved by the Kuala Lumpur and Manila authorities. Murad urged Moro refugees and immigrants in Sabah to return to their homes in the Philippines.
- Moro National Liberation Front:
  - (Muslimin Sema's faction) – The MNLF under Muslimin Sema condemned the incursions of the Sulu militants. "We (MNLF) do not support with what is happening in Sabah (the intrusion and the violent acts of the terrorists). We disapprove it. The incidents in Sabah are done to drive a wedge between our peoples." Sema said. "The incidents are also to break the bond between Sabah and the southern Philippines, as well as between Malaysia and Philippines. They want to destroy the bond (between the two peoples)", he added.
  - (Nur Misuari faction) – The MNLF under Nur Misuari, a Kiram III ally, expressed support of the Sultanate's claim on Sabah.

== Known casualties ==
=== List of killed in action (KIA) ===
==== Police ====
Name	Age	Action	Medal (posthumous)
Operators of 69 Commando of Pasukan Gerakan Khas
Inspector G/17992 Zulkifli Bin Mamat	29	Killed on the first battle at Kampung Tanduo when the terrorist suddenly shot him at point blank range	Star of the Commander of Valour (Malay: Panglima Gagah Berani）; National Sovereignty Medal (Malay:Pingat Kedaulatan Negara）; Posthumous promotion rank of ASP
Corporal 113088 Sabaruddin Bin Daud	47	Killed on the first battle at Kampung Tanduo	Star of the Commander of Valour (Malay: Panglima Gagah Berani）; National Sovereignty Medal (Malay:Pingat Kedaulatan Negara; Posthumous promotion rank of Sergeant
Special police agents of the Special Branch of Royal Malaysia Police
Superintendent G/10768 Ibrahim Bin Lebar	52	Killed on the ambush at Semporna	Star of the Commander of Valour (Malay: Panglima Gagah Berani）; National Sovereignty Medal (Malay:Pingat Kedaulatan Negara); Posthumous promotion rank of ACP
ASP G/15053 Michael Anak Padel	36	Killed on the ambush at Semporna	Star of the Commander of Valour (Malay: Panglima Gagah Berani）; National Sovereignty Medal (Malay:Pingat Kedaulatan Negara); Posthumous promotion rank of DSP
D/SGT 110204 Baharin Bin Hamit	49	Killed on the ambush at Semporna	Star of the Commander of Valour (Malay: Panglima Gagah Berani）; National Sovereignty Medal (Malay:Pingat Kedaulatan Negara); Posthumous promotion rank of Sergeant Major
Policemen of the 14th Battalion, General Operations Force of Royal Malaysia Police
SGT 124082 Abd Aziz Bin Sarikon	48	Killed on the ambush at Semporna	Star of the Commander of Valour (Malay: Panglima Gagah Berani）; National Sovereignty Medal (Malay:Pingat Kedaulatan Negara); Posthumous promotion rank of Sergeant Major
Lance Corporal 160475 Mohd Azrul Bin Tukiran	27	Killed on the ambush at Semporna	Star of the Commander of Valour (Malay: Panglima Gagah Berani）; National Sovereignty Medal (Malay:Pingat Kedaulatan Negara); Posthumous promotion rank of Corporal
Policemen of the Tawau Police District Headquarters
Support Corporal S/12675 Salam Bin Togiran	42	Killed on the ambush at Semporna	Star of the Commander of Valour (Malay: Panglima Gagah Berani）; National Sovereignty Medal (Malay:Pingat Kedaulatan Negara); Posthumous promotion rank of Support Sergeant

==== Army ====
Name	Age	Action	Medal
Soldiers of the Royal Malay Regiment of Malaysian Army
Private Ahmad Hurairah Bin Ismail	24	Killed by an enemy sniper during Ops Daulat	National Sovereignty Medal (Malay:Pingat Kedaulatan Negara); Posthumous promotion rank of Corporal
Private Ahmad Farhan Bin Ruslan	–	Mortally wounded in a traffic accident near Bandar Cenderawasih, Felda Sahabat	National Sovereignty Medal (Malay:Pingat Kedaulatan Negara); Posthumous promotion rank of Corporal

=== List of casualties in action ===
Name	Age	Action	Medal
Operators of 69 Commando of Pasukan Gerakan Khas
Corporal Mohd Tarmizi Bin Hashim	Late 30's	-	Star of the Commander of Valour (Malay: Panglima Gagah Berani); National Sovereignty Medal (Malay:Pingat Kedaulatan Negara）
Corporal Azman Bin Ampong	-	Injured at leg on the first battle at Kampung Tanduo	Star of the Commander of Valour (Malay: Panglima Gagah Berani）; National Sovereignty Medal (Malay:Pingat Kedaulatan Negara）
Constable Mohamed Qaiyum Aiqal Bin Zolkifli	23	Injured on the first battle at Kampung Tanduo	Star of the Commander of Valour (Malay: Panglima Gagah Berani); National Sovereignty Medal (Malay:Pingat Kedaulatan Negara）; currently as Corporal
Special police agents of the Special Branch of Royal Malaysia Police
ASP Hasnal Bin Jamil	30	Injured on the ambush at Semporna	Star of the Commander of Valour (Malay: Panglima Gagah Berani）; State of Kedah Star of Valour (Malay: Bintang Keberanian Kedah); National Sovereignty Medal (Malay:Pingat Kedaulatan Negara）

== See also ==
- 1985 Lahad Datu ambush
- 2013 Zamboanga City crisis
- Anti-Filipino sentiment in Sabah
- History of Sabah
