= Lahad Datu District =

Lahad Datu District Daerah Lahad Datu
- District
- Seal

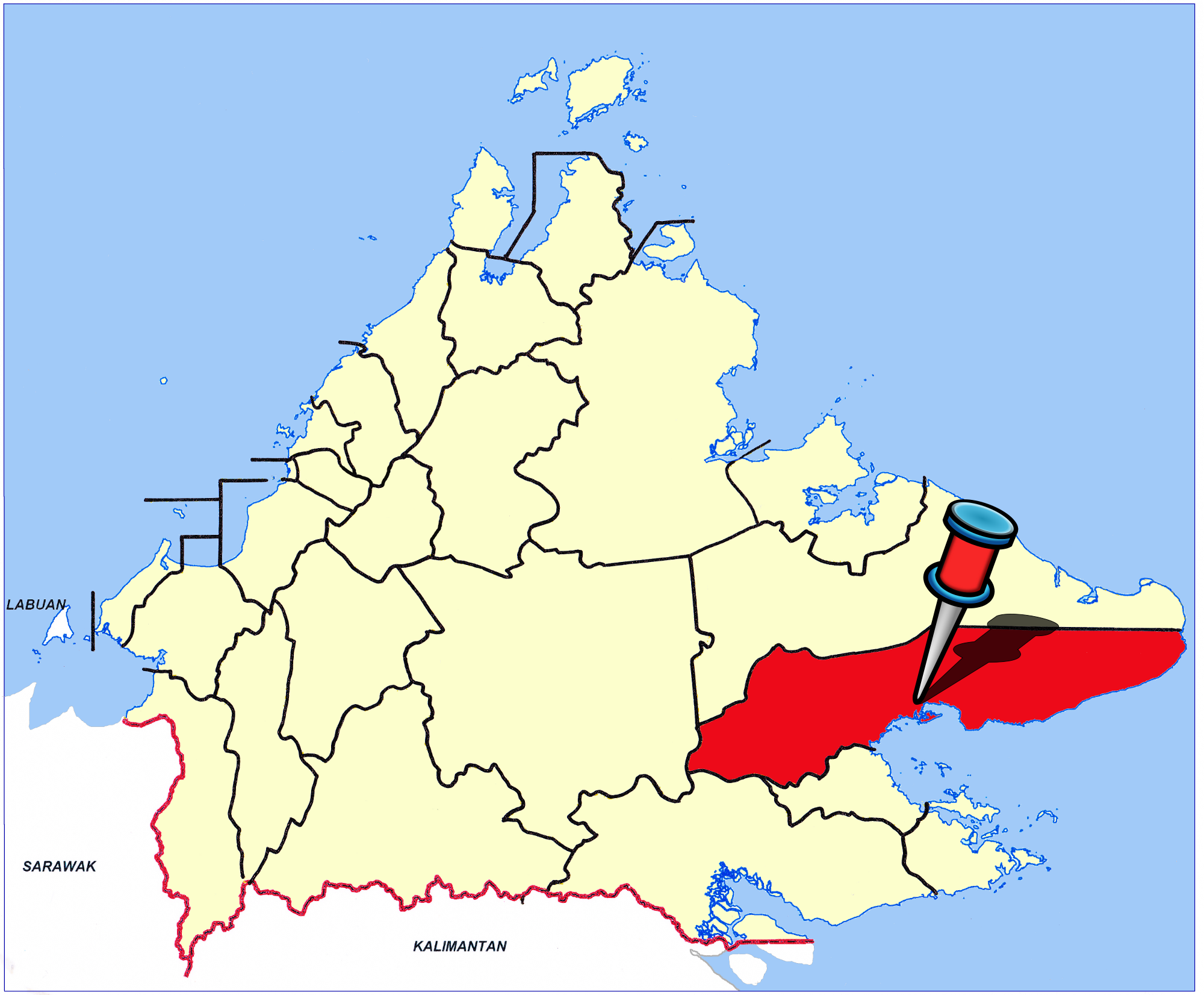
- Coordinates: 5°01′48″N 118°20′24″E
- Country: Malaysia
- State: Sabah
- Division: Tawau
- Capital: Lahad Datu

Government
  - District Officer: Firuz Idzualdeen Mohd Dzul

Area
  - Total: 6,501 km^{2} (2,510 sq mi)

Population (2010)
  - Total: 199,830
- Website: mdlahaddatu.sbh.gov.my pdlahaddatu.sbh.gov.my

Map of Lahad Datu District

The Lahad Datu District (Malay: Daerah Lahad Datu) is an administrative district in the Malaysian state of Sabah, part of the Tawau Division which includes the districts of Kunak, Lahad Datu, Semporna and Tawau. The capital of the district is in Lahad Datu Town.

== Etymology ==
The name "Lahad Datu" comes from the Bajau language, "Lahad" means the place and "Datu" means the dignity of certain people during the sultanate era. The place name traced its roots from the migration of Datu-datu from the Sultanate of Sulu led by Datu Puti as a result of the handing over this area by the Sultanate of Brunei to Sulu after the Brunei Civil War.

== History ==
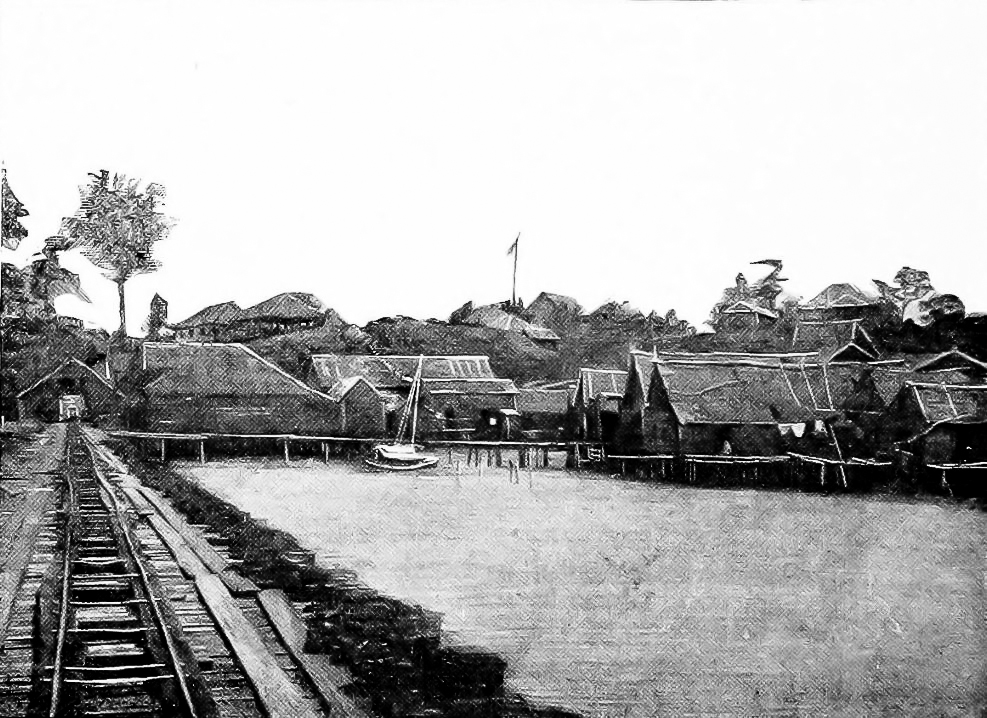
Tobacco Estate in Lahad Datu District during the British period.

Following the acquisition of this area by the North Borneo Chartered Company, the Lahad Datu District was established and subsequently became the major producer of tobacco for the company beside coconut plantations to produce copra.

On 11 February 2013, several armed Filipino supporters of the Sultanate of Sulu, calling themselves the Royal Security Forces of the Sultanate of Sulu and North Borneo, arrived in Lahad Datu district and occupied the village of Tanduo. They were sent by Jamalul Kiram III, a claimant to the throne of the sultanate. His stated goal is to assert the Philippine territorial claim to eastern Sabah as part of the North Borneo dispute. In response, Malaysian security forces surrounded the village. After several negotiations with the group by the Philippine and Malaysian governments to reach a peaceful solution were unsuccessful, the standoff escalated into an armed conflict which ended with 56 followers of the self-proclaimed sultanate dead and the rest captured by the Malaysian authorities. The Malaysian forces lost ten people in addition to six civilians.

== Demographics ==
According to the 2010 census, the population of Lahad Datu district is estimated to be around 199,830. As in other districts of Sabah, there are a significant number of illegal immigrants from the nearby southern Philippines, mainly from the Sulu Archipelago and Mindanao, many of whom are not included in the population statistics. The population of the district is divided among the larger communities and the total area of the district as follows:

Lahad Datu District	199,830 inhabitants
Lahad Datu	27,887
Tungku	1,085
Remaining areas	170,858

== Tourism ==
The district has several tourist attractions, including Danum Valley Conservation Area, Tabin Wildlife Reserve and the Madai Cave.

== Gallery ==
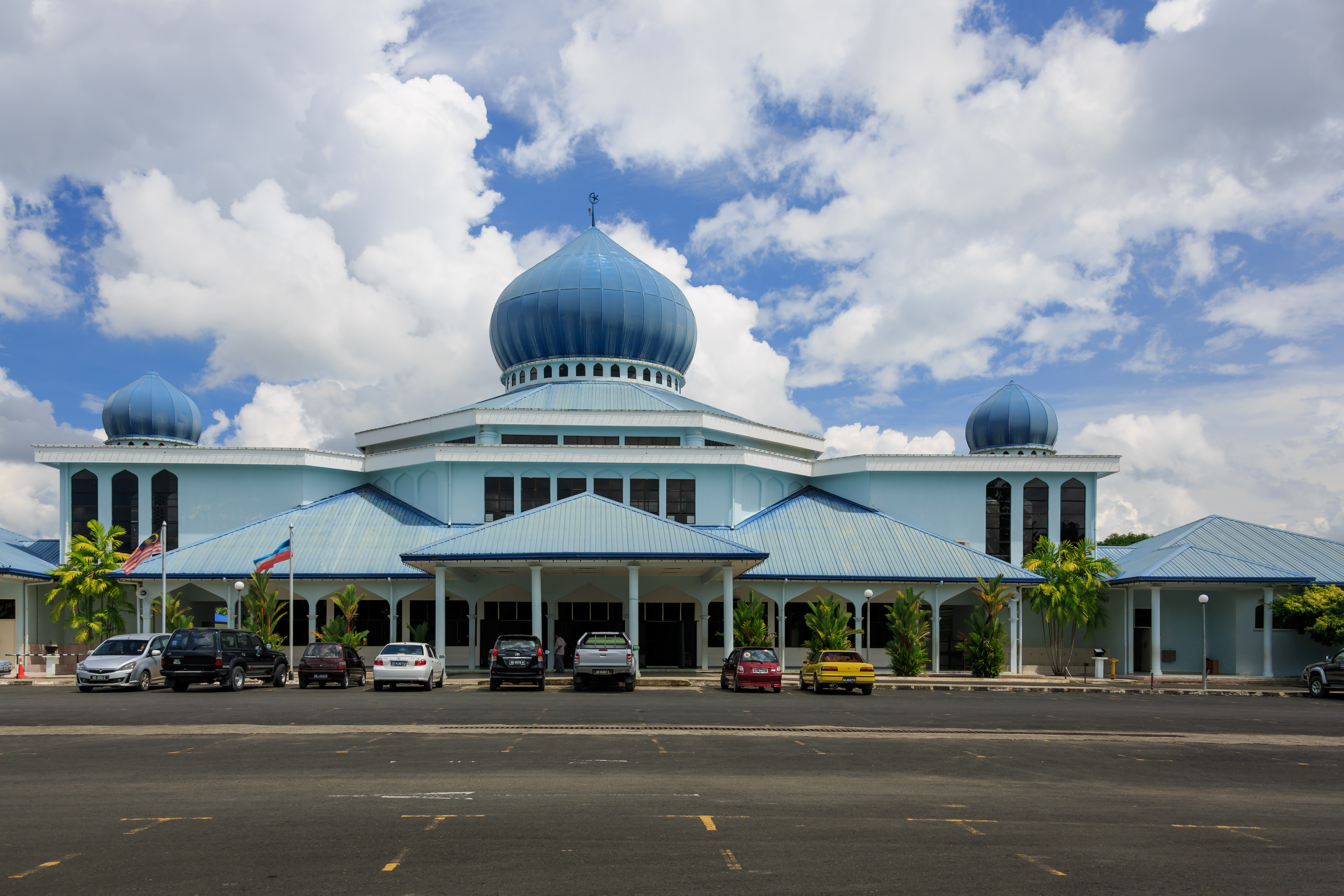
Ar Raudah Mosque

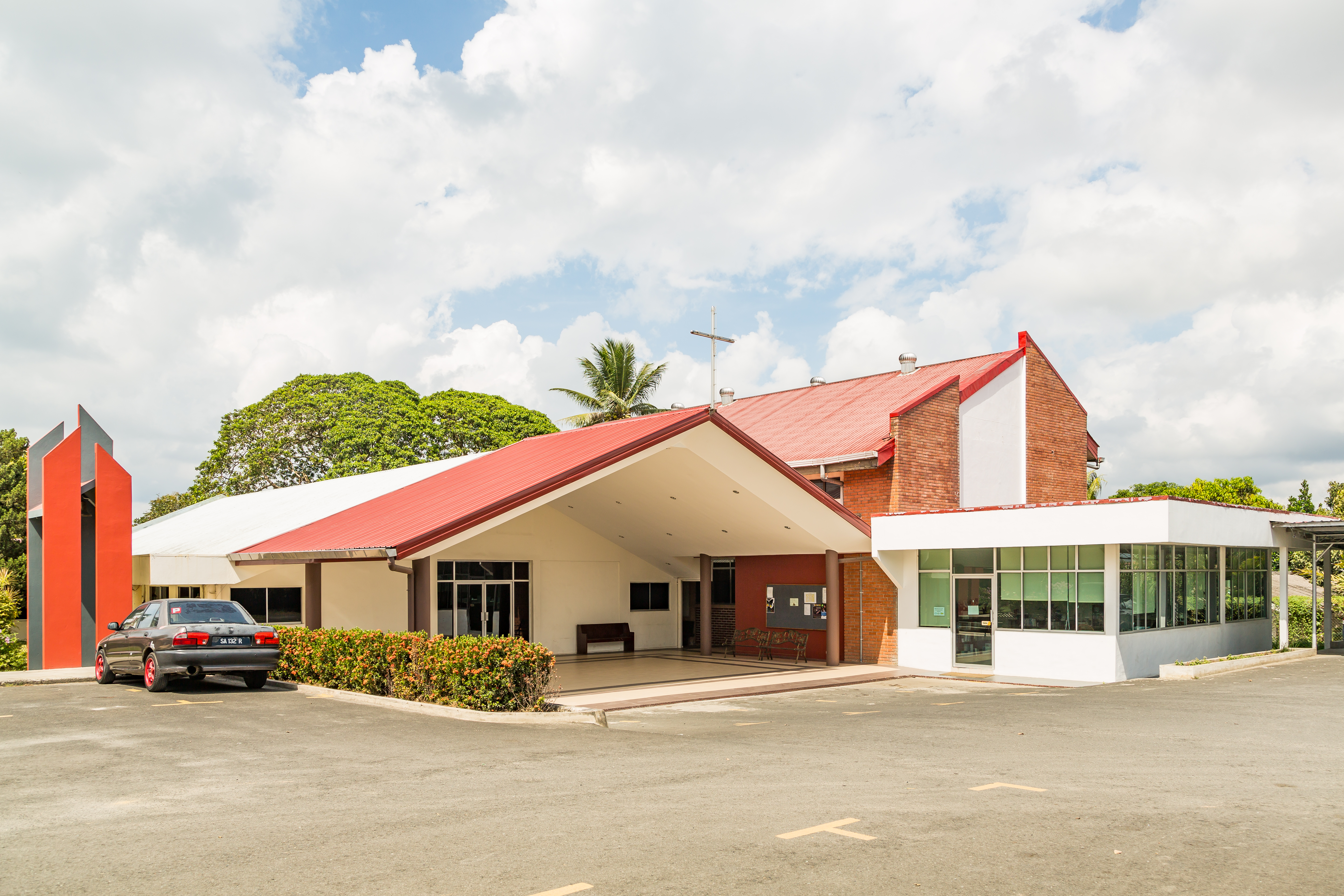
St. Mark Anglican Church

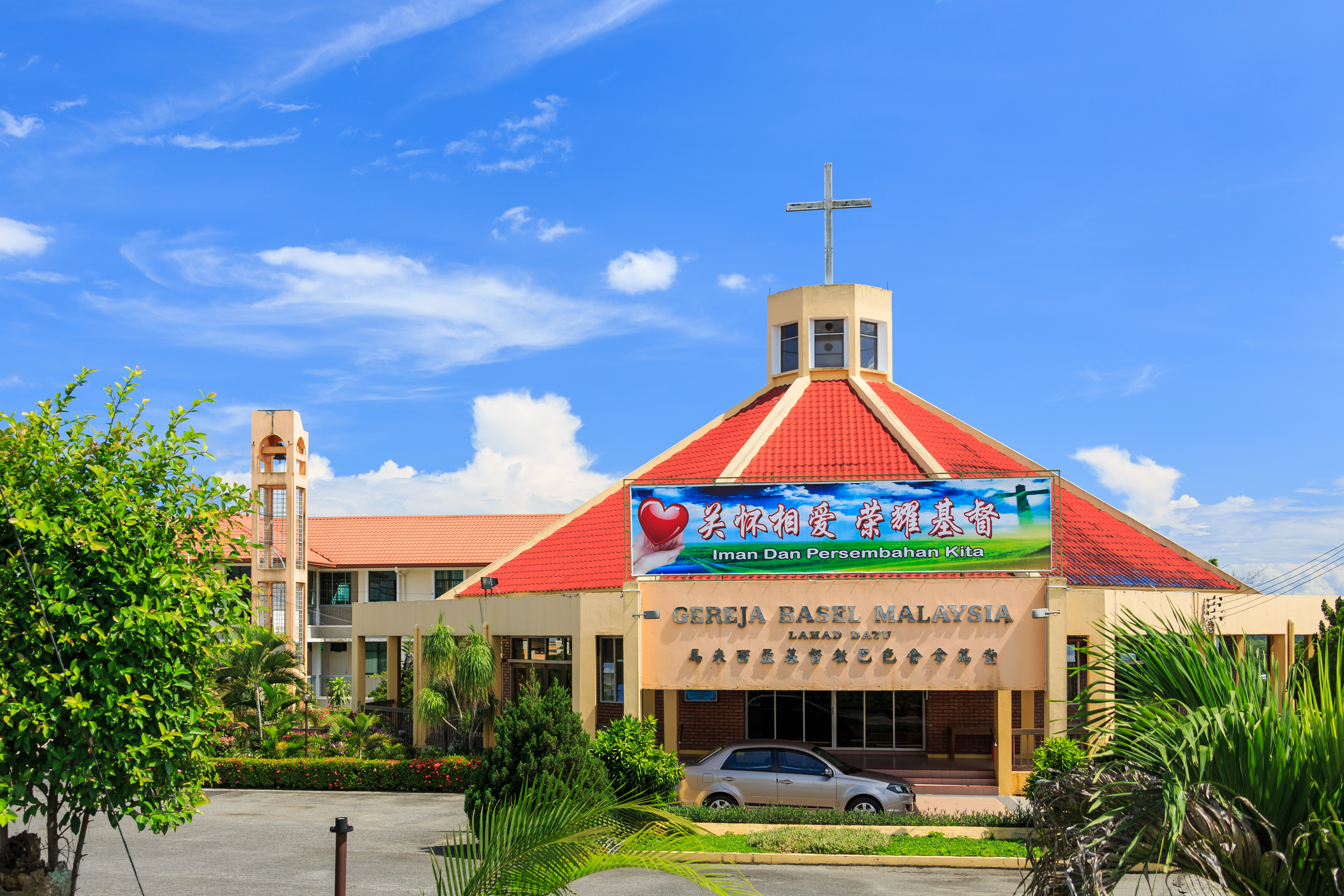
Lahad Datu Basel Church

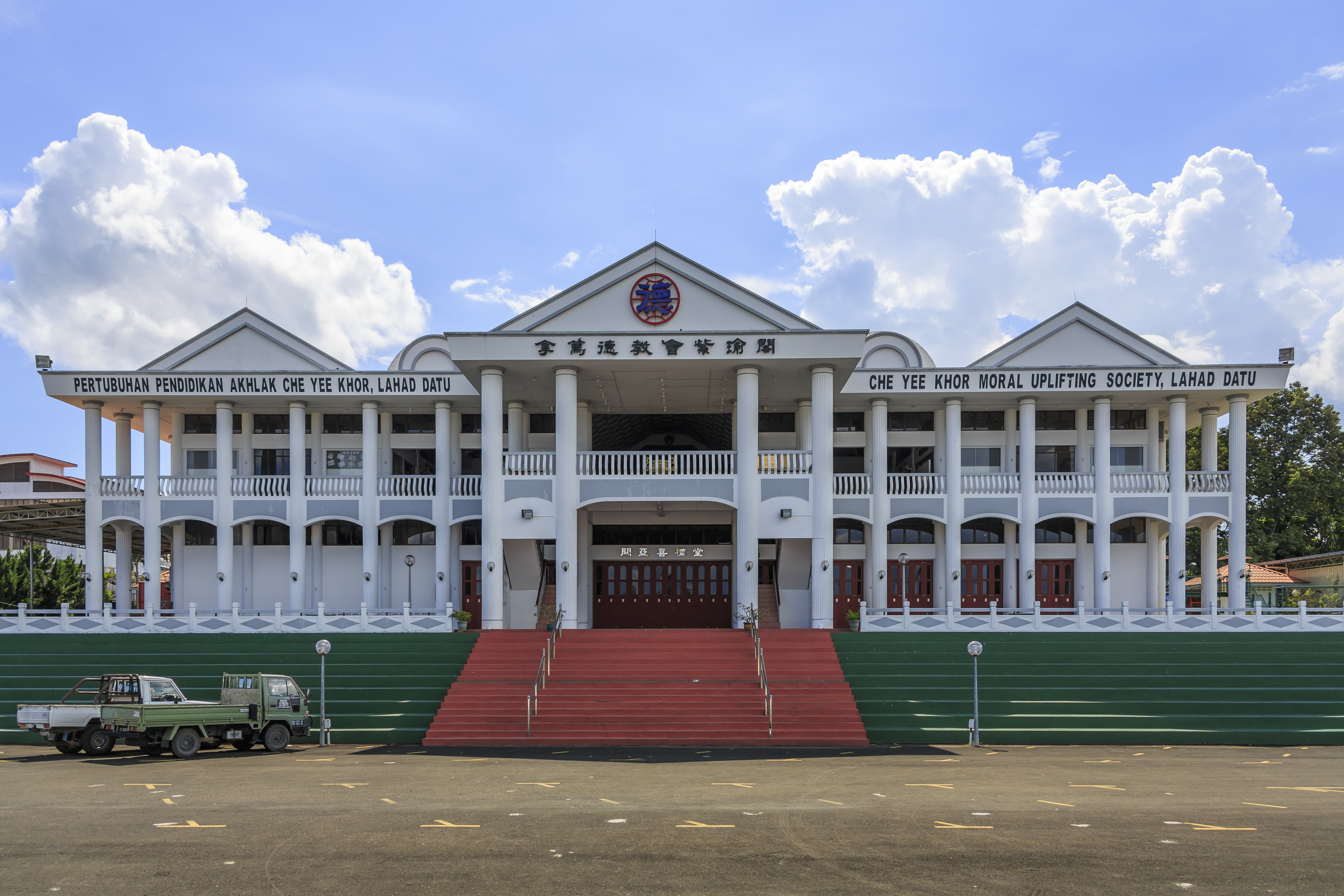
Che Yee Khor Moral Uplifting Society

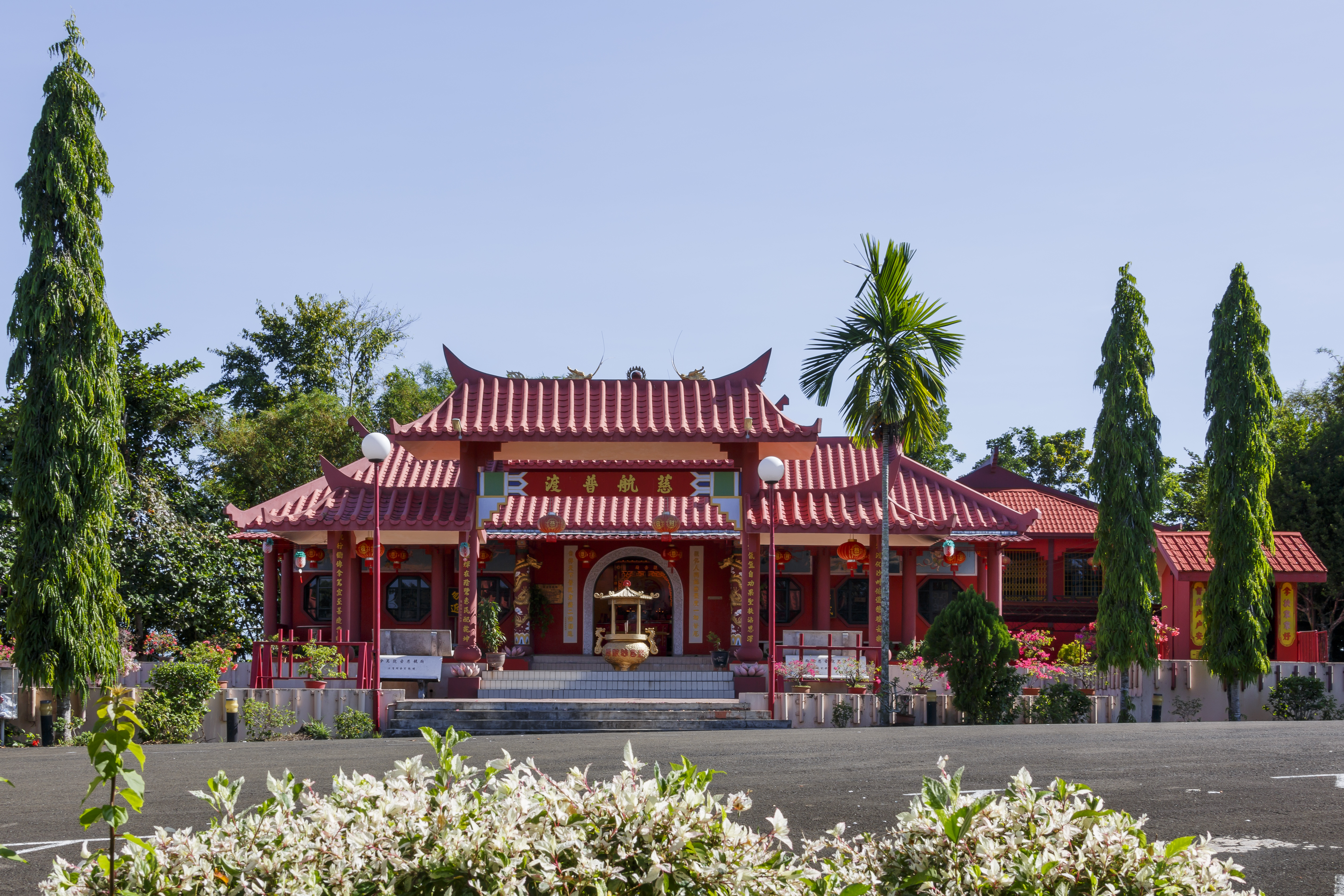
Guan Yin Temple

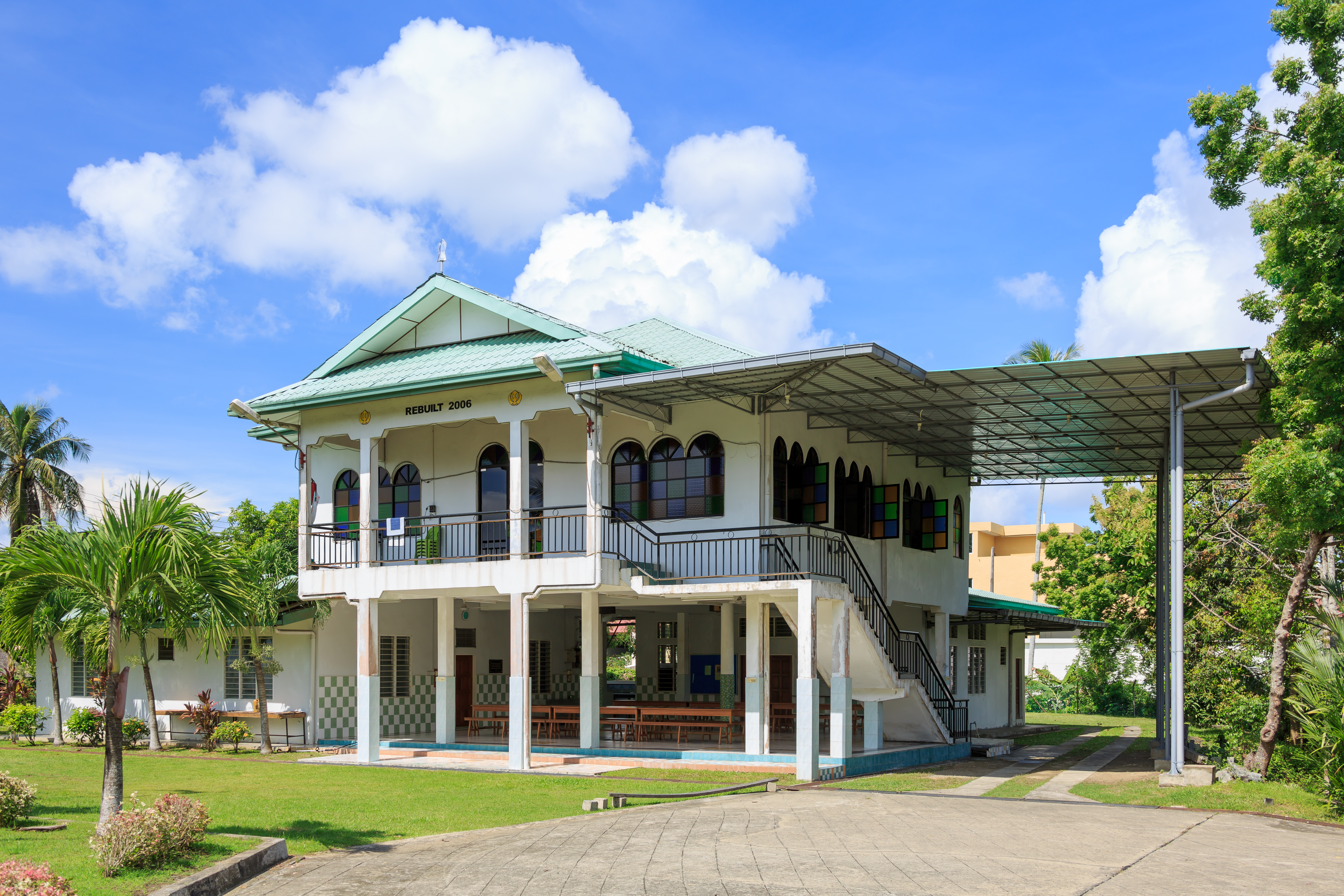
Gurdwara Sahib Lahad Datu

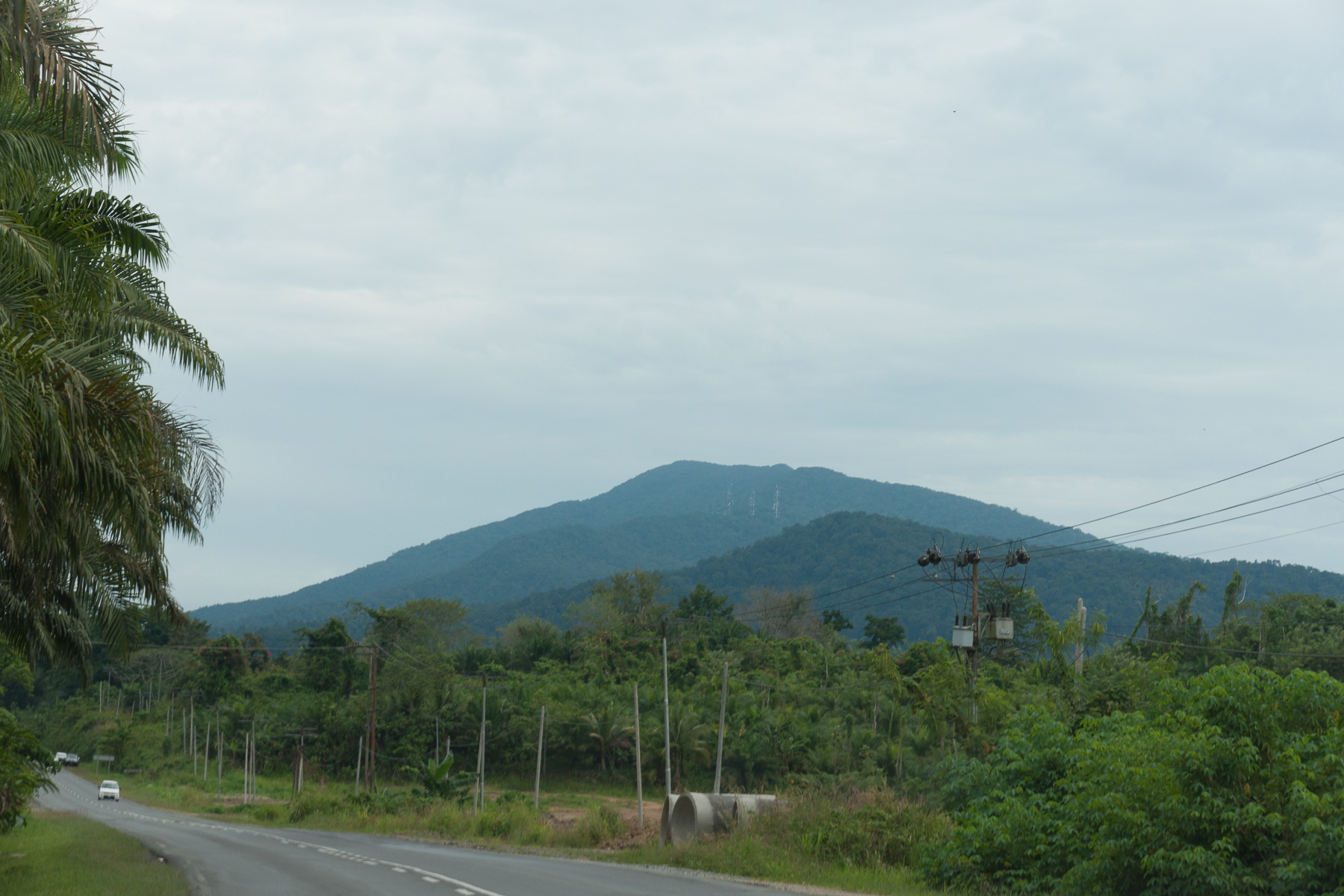
Mount Silam

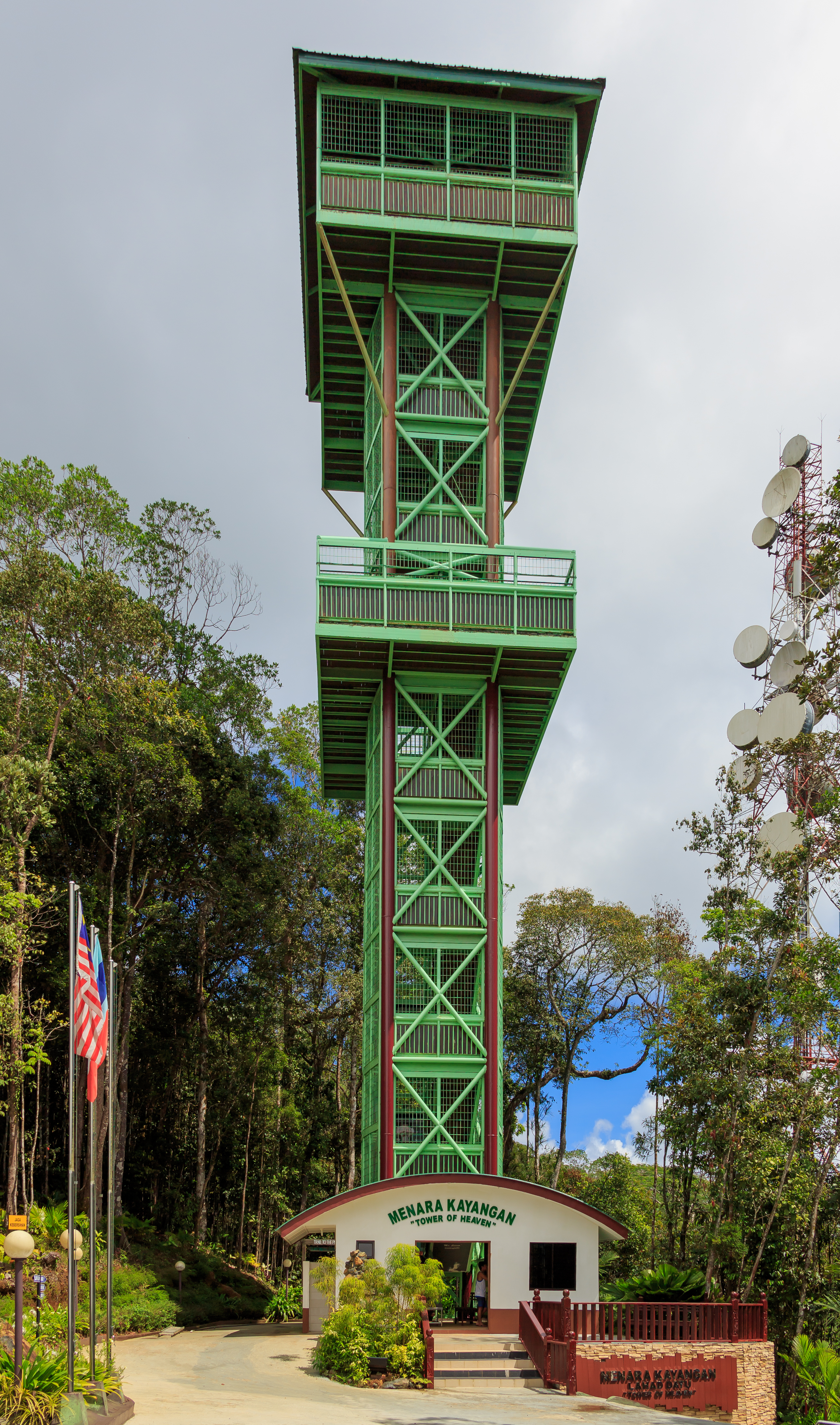
Tower of Heaven

== See also ==
- Districts of Malaysia
