= Ot Danum =

Ot Danum may be,

- Ot Danum people, of Indonesia in Borneo
- Ot Danum language, their Austronesian language

== See also ==
- Danum (disambiguation)
