= Tanduo =

Malaysian village

Tanduo is a small village in Tawau Division, Sabah, Malaysia. The village is located about 37 kilometres from Lahad Datu town. It is the site where the 2013 Lahad Datu standoff happened, and has since been transformed into a military camp.
