= Mount Danum =

Mountain in Malaysia

- Location within Malaysia

Highest point
- Elevation: 1,093 m (3,586 ft)
- Listing: Ribu
- Coordinates: 4°57′N 117°41′E

Naming
- Native name: Gunung Danum (Malay)

Geography
- Location: Tawau Division, Sabah, Malaysia

Mount Danum (Malay: Gunung Danum) is a mountain located at the Tawau Division of Sabah, Malaysia. With a height of 1,093 metres (3,586 ft), it is the highest peak in the Danum Valley Conservation Area.
