= Merdeka Square, Kota Kinabalu =

Square in Kota Kinabalu, Malaysia

Coordinates: 5°58′50.9916″N 116°4′37.0524″E

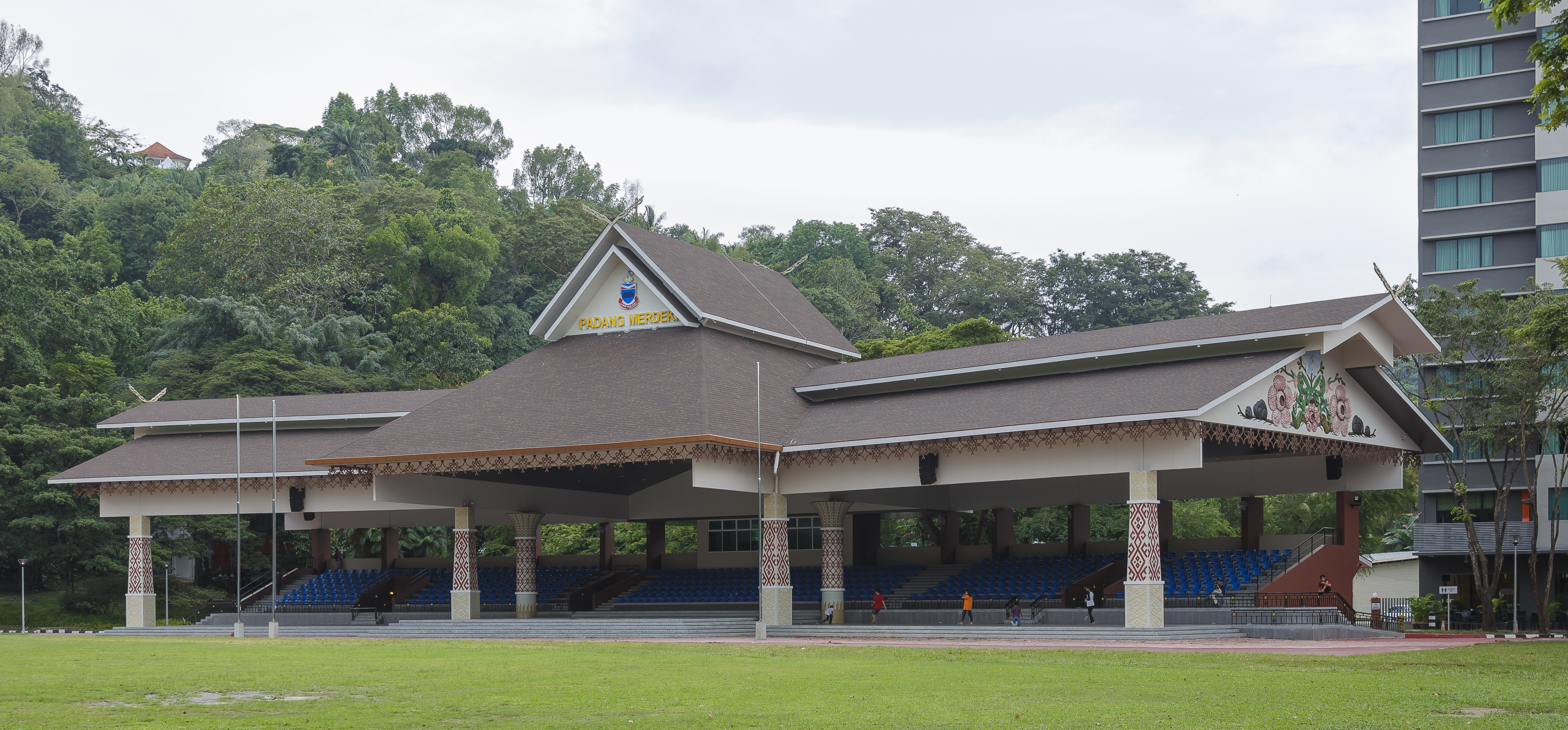
Merdeka Square with new building (pavilion) in 2014.

Merdeka Square (Malay: Padang Merdeka) is a square located in Kota Kinabalu, Sabah, Malaysia. The square has a capacity of around 5,000.

== History ==
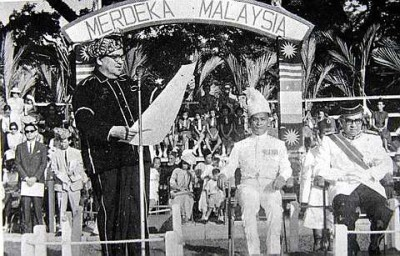
Donald Stephens (left) declaring the forming of the Federation of Malaysia at Merdeka Square, Jesselton on 16 September 1963. Together with him is the Deputy Minister of Malaya Abdul Razak (right) and Mustapha Harun (second right).

The square once became the site for sporting events during British North Borneo Crown period. Before the Jesselton Community Hall was built in the 1950s, the square is not just used as a football field, but also became a parade site especially before the construction of Kota Kinabalu Sports Complex. On 16 September 1963, the late Chief Minister Donald Stephens declared the formation of the Federation of Malaysia at the site. Since then, the square is only used for small ceremonies. In 2015, the square was closed for several months for renovation works. On 23 February 2018, it is one of 24 heritage sites in the state that were gazetted by Sabah’s State Heritage Council under new enactment of "State Heritage Enactment 2017".

== See also ==
- Merdeka Square, Kuala Lumpur
- Merdeka Square, Jakarta
