= Danum Valley Conservation Area =

Protected area in Sabah, Malaysia

- IUCN category Ia (strict nature reserve)
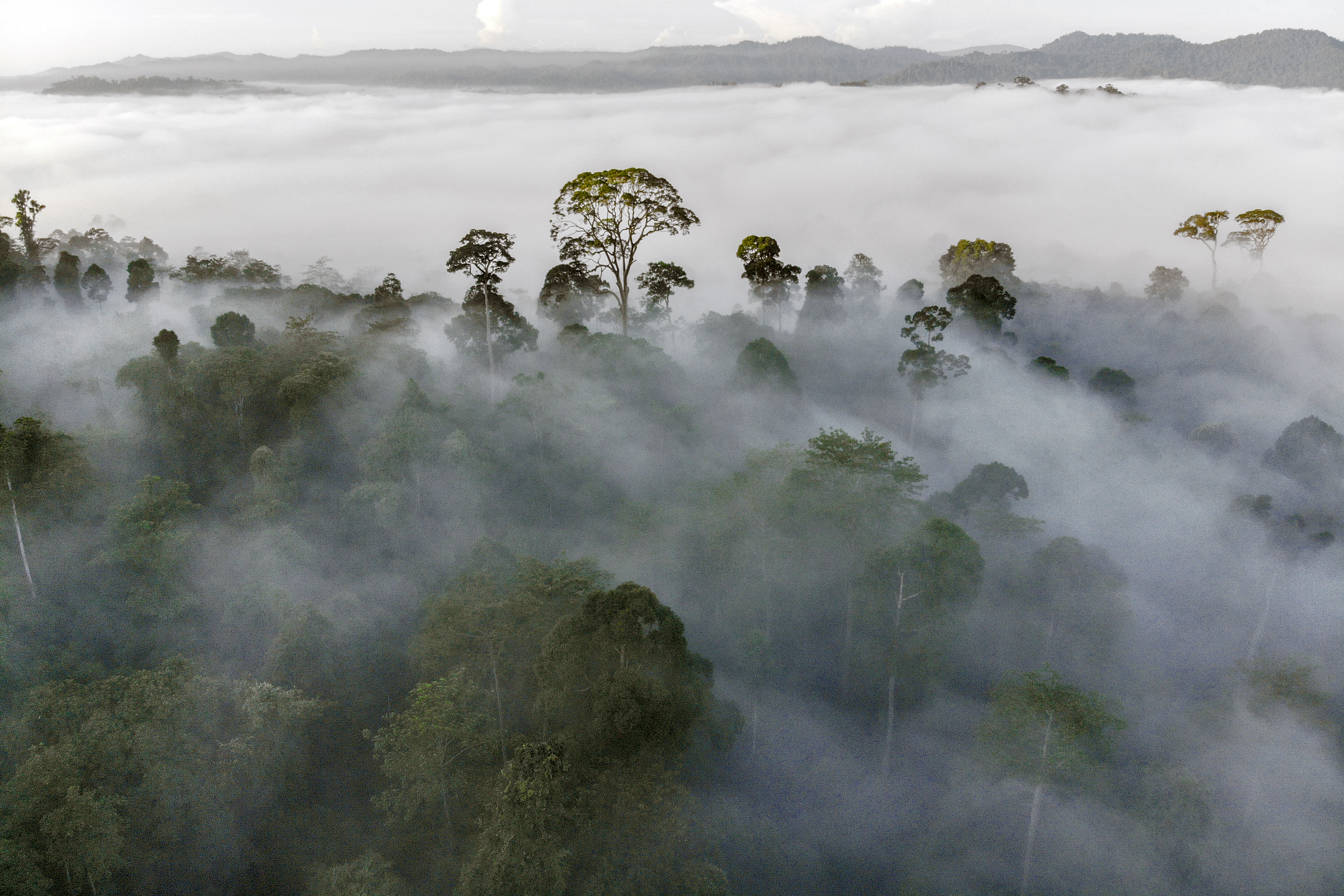
- Morning fog over Danum Valley, Borneo

- Location within Borneo
- Location: Sabah, Malaysia
- Nearest city: Lahad Datu
- Coordinates: 4°55′N 117°40′E
- Area: 438 km^{2} (169 sq mi)
- Established: 1980

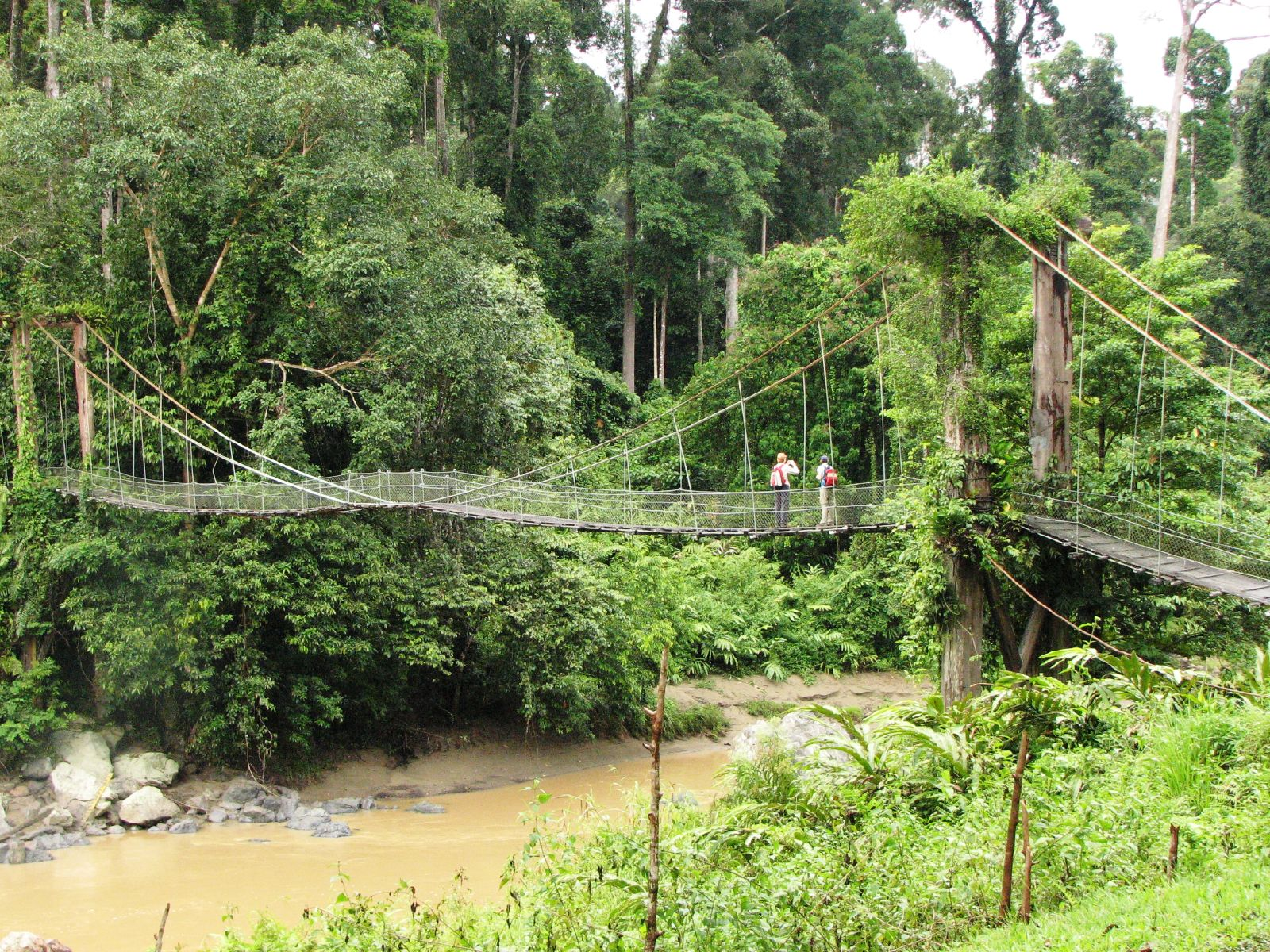
Footbridge to the tropical rainforest in Danum Valley

Danum Valley Conservation Area is a 438 square kilometres (169 sq mi) tract of relatively undisturbed lowland dipterocarp forest in Sabah, Malaysia. It has an extensive diversity of tropical flora and fauna, including species such as the rare Bornean orangutan, gibbons, mousedeer, clouded leopards and over 270 bird species. Visitor activities include jungle treks, river swimming, birdwatching, night jungle tours and excursions to nearby logging sites and timber mills.

There were no human settlements within the area before it became a conservation area, meaning that hunting, logging and other human interference were non-existent, making the area almost unique. It is managed by Yayasan Sabah for conservation, research, education, and habitat restoration training purposes. There have been proposals to nominate the site as a UNESCO World Heritage Site.

== Geography ==
Danum Valley is situated within the Brassey Range. The nearest town, Lahad Datu is about 82 kilometres (51 mi) away, about a 2 hours' drive on mainly logging roads. Danum Valley Field Centre is a research establishment for scientists and educational purposes, and a nursery for propagating Dipterocarpus trees by the 100,000s. There are few lodges here for tourists; one of the most established lodges is the Borneo Rainforest Lodge. From here visitors can do guided walks through lowland rainforest trails and night safari walks or drives. Many people visit mainly for birdwatching and wildlife sightings. Other lodges include Kawag Nature Lodge. The valley is bowl-shaped, with a maximum land height of 1,093 metres (3,586 ft).

== Natural history ==
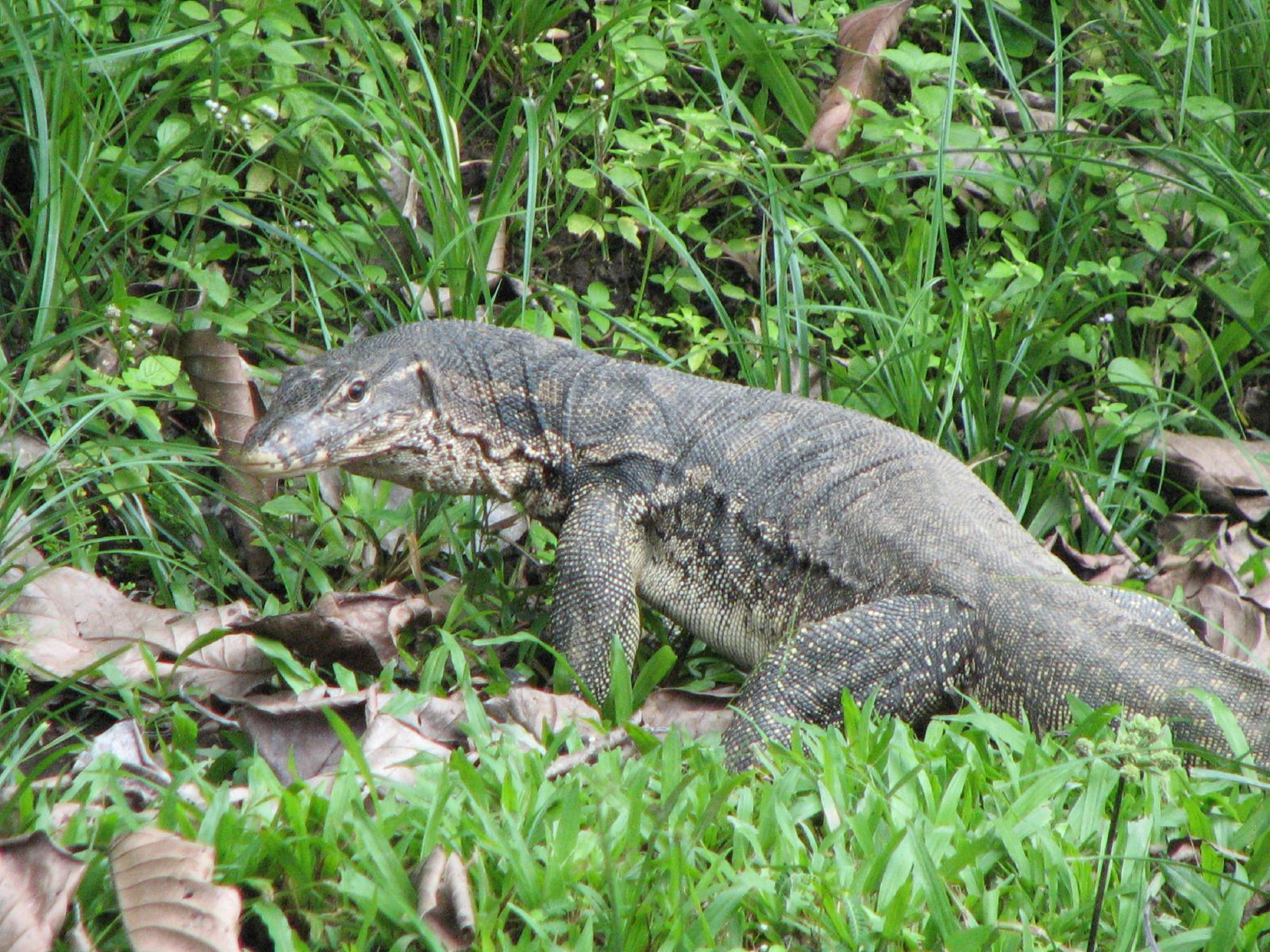
Varanus salvator, about 1.5 metres (4.9 ft) long

=== Fauna ===
The lowland tropical rainforest is home to many birds and mammals. It is the only place where the enigmatic spectacled flowerpecker has been recorded. Bornean orangutans, Müller's Bornean gibbons, and other primates, including Horsfield's tarsier, as well as deer, wild cats and the rare Bornean pygmy elephant may be seen.

Wild orangutan at Danum Valley

Other notable species that inhabit the area are the sun bear and the clouded leopard. The Bornean rhinoceros was also present in this area until recently, with the last known individual captured and moved to a breeding facility in 2014 after decades of population decline. The rich insect fauna has been one of the main areas of research in which the Danum Valley Field Centre has been active, and the land snail fauna is also considered one of the richest in the world, with at least 61 species recorded in a 1 square kilometre (0.39 sq mi) plot.

=== Flora ===
Flora is primarily that of the Borneo lowland rain forests habitat, with dipterocarp trees predominating. In places the forest canopy reaches a height of over 70 metres (230 ft). The greatest diversity of Dipterocarpus species occur on Borneo. Species endemic or native to the island include D. acutangulus, D. applanatus, D. borneensis, D. caudatus, D. caudiferus, D. confertus, D. conformis, D. coriaceus, D. costulatus, D. crinitus, D. elongatus, D. eurynchus, D. fusiformis, D. geniculatus, D. glabrigemmatus, D. globosus, D. gracilis, D. grandiflorus, D. hasseltii, D. humeratus, D. kerrii, D. mundus, D. ochraceus, D. palembanicus, D. sarawakensis, D. tempehes, D. validus and D. verrucosus. The valley is home to over 15,000 plant species, though 94% of the plants belong to the dipterocarp genus. Other flora seen in the valley are pitcher plants. In 2019, the world's tallest tropical tree, a yellow meranti (Richetia faguetiana) called Menara, was discovered in the valley. It was measured at 97.58 m (320.1 ft), which ranks it as the world's tallest known living tropical tree.

== See also ==
- Borneo lowland rain forest ecoregion
- Deforestation in Borneo
- List of old-growth forests
