= Dipterocarp timber classification =

Classification of wood from Dipterocarp trees

The following table associates tree species, wood name and wood colour.

The Dipterocarp timber classification system was developed by Colin Fraser Symington (1905-1943), a forester at the Malayan Forestry Service, and H. E. Desch, who researched comparative wood anatomy.

Genus & section	Species	Wood name	Wood colour	Wood type
Anisoptera	A. cochinchinensis, A. marginata, A. scaphula, A. thurifera and about ten other species	Mersawa		light hardwood
Cotylelobium	C. burckii, C. lanceolatum, C. melanoxylon	Resak		heavy hardwood (dense)
Dipterocarpus	D. alatus, D. baudii, D. basilanicus, D. borneensis, D. caudiferus, D. costulatus, D. grandiflorus, D. kerrii, D. tonkinensis, D. verrucosus, D. warburgii, and about 60 other species	Keruing		medium hardwood
Dryobalanops	D. aromatica, D. beccarii, D. fusca, D. keithii, D. lanceolata, D. oblongifolia, D. rappa	Kapur, kapor		medium hardwood
Hopea	H. acuminata, H. beccariana, H. dryobalanoides, H. mengarawan, H. nervosa, H. odorata, H. sangal and other species	Merawan		medium hardwood
Hopea	H. ferrea, H. forbesii, H. helferi, H. nutans, H. semicuneata and other species	Giam		heavy hardwood
Neobalanocarpus	N. heimii	Cengal		heavy hardwood
Parashorea	P. aptera, P. buchananii, P. chinensis, P. densiflora, P. globosa, P. lucida, P. macrophylla, P. malaanonan, P. parvifolia, P. smythiesii, P. stellata, P. tomentella	Gerutu		light hardwood
Parashorea	Parashorea plicata	Bagtikan	grey-brown
Pentacme (formerly Shorea sect. Pentacme)	P. contorta, P. minandensis	White lauan	grey to very light red
Shorea sect. Shorea	S. atrinervosa S. brunnescens S. crassa S. exelliptica S. foxworthyi S. glauca S. havilandii S. laevis S. leptoderma S. materialis S. maxwelliana S. seminis S. submontana S. sumatrana S. superba	Balau		heavy hardwood
Shorea sect. Almon	S. almon S. contorta S. leprosula S. leptoclados S. smithiana	Almon	light red to pink
Anthoshorea (formerly Shorea sect. Anthoshorea)	S. assamica S. bracteolata S. dealbata S. hypochra S. javanica S. lamellata S. maranti (other species of the White Meranti group include: S. agamii S. confusa S. cordata S. gratissima S. ochracea S. resinosa S. symingtonii S. virescens)	White meranti		light hardwood
Richetia (formerly Shorea sect. Richetioides)	S. acuminatissima S. faguetiana S. gibbosa S. hopeifolia S. multiflora	Yellow meranti		light hardwood
Rubroshorea (formerly Shorea sects. Brachypterae, Mutica, Ovalis, Pachycarpae, Rubella, and Rubroshorea)	S. curtisii S. hemsleyana S. macrantha R. pauciflora R. platyclados S. rugosa, S. singkawang (S. acuminata) (S. siamensis)... 2 other spp.	Dark red meranti (Meranti bukit)		light hardwood
Rubroshorea (formerly Shorea sects. Brachypterae, Mutica, Ovalis, Pachycarpae, Rubella, and Rubroshorea)	S. acuminata S. dasyphylla S. johorensis S. lepidota S. parvifolia (S. siamensis) (S. myrionerva)	Light red meranti		light hardwood
Rubroshorea (formerly Shorea sects. Brachypterae, Mutica, Ovalis, Pachycarpae, Rubella, and Rubroshorea)	S. balangeran S. collina S. guiso S. kunstleri S. ochrophloia S. plagata	Red balau		heavy hardwood
Shorea	S. macroptera	Meranti		light hardwood
Shorea	S. negrosensis	Red lauan	dark red-brown to brick red
Shorea	S. ovata	Tianong	light red to light red-brown
Shorea	S. platyclados	Meranti bukit		light hardwood
Shorea	S. polysperma	Tanguile	red to red-brown
Shorea	S. robusta	Sal
Shorea	S. palosapis	Mayapis	light red to red-brown
Shorea	S. uliginosa	Meranti bakau		light hardwood
