= Kapur (wood) =

Dipterocarp hardwood

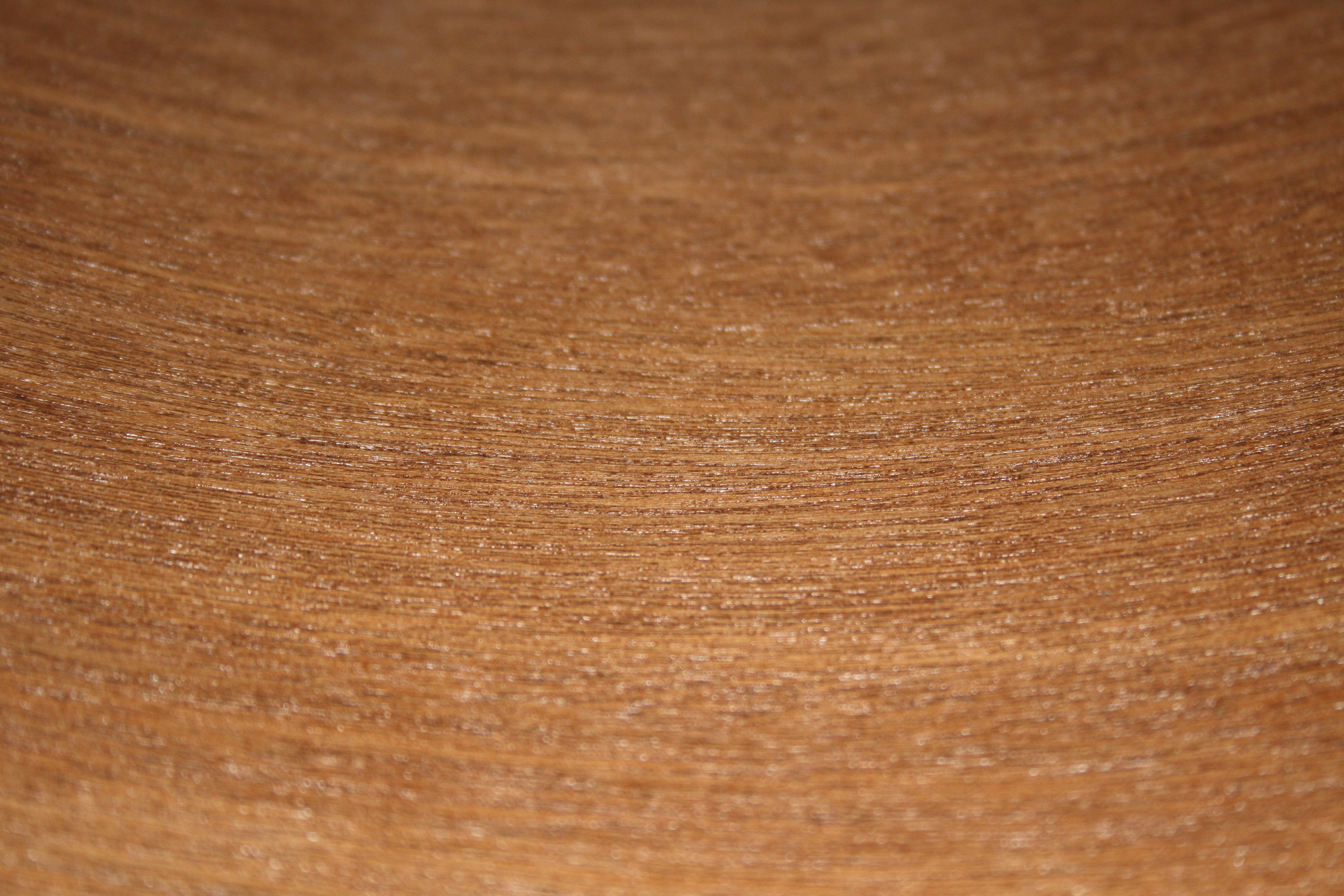
Inside of a custom bass drum shell made of Malaysian kapur wood

Kapur (or kapor) is a dipterocarp hardwood from trees of the genus Dryobalanops found in lowland tropical rainforests of Malaysia, Indonesia and South-East Asia. It is a durable construction tropical timber. One variety, D. aromatica, is a source of camphor.

== Species ==
The name kapur can refer to the following species from the Dryobalanops genus:

- D. aromatica
- D. beccarii
- D. fusca
- D. keithii
- D. lanceolata
- D. oblongifolia
- D. rappa

== Deforestation ==
Kapur is logged from old-growth forest, often illegally. These forests have developed over the course of hundreds of years. When harvested, these trees are often between 250 and 1000 years old. For a tree from the family Dipterocarpaceae, it takes approximately 100 years to reach a height of 30 meters. Most of the species that are sold as kapur are listed on the IUCN Red List for endangered species. For example, D. fusca is critically endangered.

Overexploitation has led to large scale deforestation in the tropics. The International Tropical Timber Organization is concerned with conserving the habitat of trees producing tropical timber.

According to FSC, certified tropical hardwood can counteract deforestation. Forests that are managed according to the FSC standards, become economically valuable and might therefore not be converted to farmland. However, other organisations advise consumers to stay away from kapur altogether to avoid logging of centuries-old trees.

== See also ==
- Dipterocarp timber classification
