= Yacal =

Yacal may refer to:

- Yacal (tree), a Philippine timber tree with heavy hard wood.
- USS Yacal (YFB-688), a ferry that served in the United States Navy from 1932 to 1942.
