= Anthoshorea agamae =

Conservation status
- Near Threatened (IUCN 3.1)

Scientific classification
- Kingdom: Plantae
- Clade: Tracheophytes
- Clade: Angiosperms
- Clade: Eudicots
- Clade: Rosids
- Order: Malvales
- Family: Dipterocarpaceae
- Genus: Anthoshorea
- Species: A. agamae

Binomial name
- Anthoshorea agamae (G.H.S.Wood ex P.S.Ashton) P.S.Ashton & J.Heck. (2022)

Synonyms
- Shorea agami P.S.Ashton (1962); Shorea agami subsp. diminuta P.S.Ashton (1967)

Species of flowering plant

Anthoshorea agamae, synonym Shorea agami, is a species of plant in the family Dipterocarpaceae. The species is named after J. Agama a one time forest officer in the Sabah Forestry Department.

Anthoshorea agamae is endemic to Borneo. It is an emergent tree, up to 50 m (160 ft) tall. It grows in mixed dipterocarp forest on well-drained sandy clay soils and clay-rich soils, up to 700 m (2,300 ft) elevation. It is a light hardwood sold under the trade names of white meranti. A. agamae is found in at least three protected areas (Kabilli-Sepilok Forest Reserve, Lambir & Gunung Mulu National Parks), but is threatened elsewhere due to habitat loss.

Originally described as Shorea agami, Peter Shaw Ashton recognised two subspecies, subsp. agami and subsp diminuta, which are now considered synonyms. The subspecies name diminuta is derived from Latin (diminutus = made small) and refers to the smaller leaves of this subspecies.
