= Anthoshorea confusa =

Conservation status
- Vulnerable (IUCN 3.1)

Scientific classification
- Kingdom: Plantae
- Clade: Tracheophytes
- Clade: Angiosperms
- Clade: Eudicots
- Clade: Rosids
- Order: Malvales
- Family: Dipterocarpaceae
- Genus: Anthoshorea
- Species: A. confusa

Binomial name
- Anthoshorea confusa (P.S.Ashton) P.S.Ashton & J.Heck. (2022)

Synonyms
- Shorea confusa P.S.Ashton (1978)

Species of tree

Anthoshorea confusa is a species of plant in the family Dipterocarpaceae. The species name is derived from Latin (confusus = confused) and refers to the fact that this species is often misidentified as Anthoshorea virescens. A. confusa is endemic to Borneo. It is an emergent tree, up to 50 metres (160 ft) tall, in mixed dipterocarp forest on clay-rich soils. It is a light hardwood sold under the trade names of white meranti. A. confusa is found in at least three protected areas (Lambir National Park, Bukit Taviu and Ulu Telupid Forest Reserves), but is threatened elsewhere due to habitat loss.
