= A. marginata =

A. marginata may refer to:

- Aganosma marginata, a liana species found in eastern Asia
- Alaria marginata, a brown alga species
- Anisoptera marginata, a plant species found in Sumatra, Peninsular Malaysia and Borneo
- Artanthe marginata, a synonym for Piper marginatum, the cake bush, Anesi wiwiri, marigold pepper, Ti Bombé in Creole or Hinojo, a plant species found in moist, shady spots in the Amazon rainforest in Surinam, French Guiana and Brazil
- Archachatina marginata, a species of giant African snail.
