= Anisoptera (disambiguation) =

Anisoptera may refer to:

- Anisoptera, an insect suborder containing dragonflies
- Anisoptera (Conocephalus), a subgenus of bush cricket in the subfamily Conocephalinae
- Anisoptera (plant), a genus of plants in the family Dipterocarpaceae
