= Anisoptera curtisii =

Conservation status
- Vulnerable (IUCN 3.1)

Scientific classification
- Kingdom: Plantae
- Clade: Tracheophytes
- Clade: Angiosperms
- Clade: Eudicots
- Clade: Rosids
- Order: Malvales
- Family: Dipterocarpaceae
- Genus: Anisoptera
- Species: A. curtisii

Binomial name
- Anisoptera curtisii Dyer ex King

Species of tree

Anisoptera curtisii is a species of flowering plant in the family Dipterocarpaceae. It is native to Myanmar, Thailand, Peninsular Malaysia, and Sumatra.
