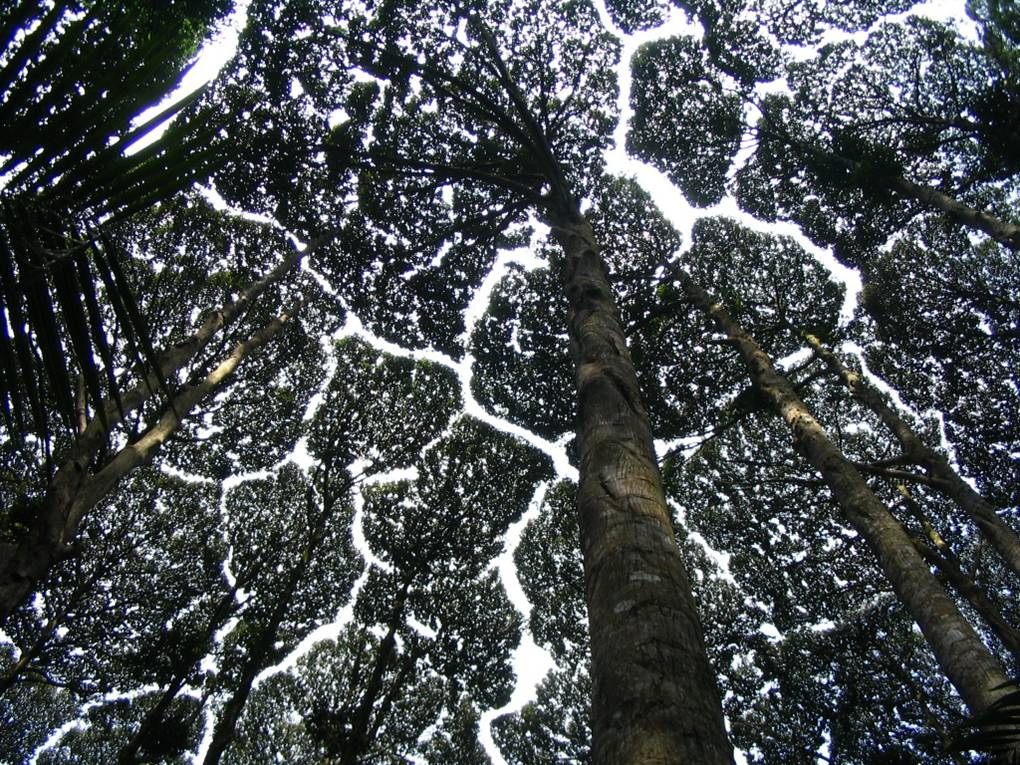
- Canopy of D. aromatica in the Forest Research Institute Malaysia, Kuala Lumpur displaying crown shyness

Conservation status
- Vulnerable (IUCN 3.1)

Scientific classification
- Kingdom: Plantae
- Clade: Tracheophytes
- Clade: Angiosperms
- Clade: Eudicots
- Clade: Rosids
- Order: Malvales
- Family: Dipterocarpaceae
- Genus: Dryobalanops
- Species: D. aromatica

Binomial name
- Dryobalanops aromatica C.F.Gaertn.

Synonyms
- Dipterocarpus dryobalanops Steud.; Dipterocarpus teres Steud.; Dryobalanops camphora Colebr.; Dryobalanops junghuhnii Becc.; Dryobalanops sumatrensis (J.F.Gmel.) Kosterm.; Dryobalanops vriesii Becc; Pterigium teres Corrêa; Shorea camphorifera Roxb.

= Dryobalanops aromatica =

Species of tree

Dryobalanops aromatica, commonly known as Borneo camphor, camphor tree, Malay camphor, or Sumatran camphor, is a species of plant in the family Dipterocarpaceae. The species name aromatica is derived from Latin (aromaticus meaning spice-like) and refers to the smell of the dammar (resin). This species was one of the main sources of camphor and attracted early Arab traders to Borneo, at that time being worth more than gold, and used for incense and perfumes. Marco Polo reported that the finest camphor came from Fansuri, which referred to Barus in present-day Sumatra. However, the species is known more as a source of camphor oil or borneol, a source of confusion noted since Burkill for the confusion with the product of Cinnamomum officinarum.

It is found in Sumatra, peninsular Malaysia, and Borneo.

It is a large emergent tree, up to 65 m or even 75 m tall, found in mixed dipterocarp forests on deep humic yellow sandy soils. It is a heavy hardwood sold under the trade names of Kapur. It is recorded from at least two protected areas (Lambir and Gunung Mulu National Parks).

Bergenin, malaysianol A, laevifonol, ampelopsin E, α-viniferin, ε-viniferin and diptoindonesin A can be isolated from the stem bark of D. aromatica.

Dryobalanops aromatica is one of several tree species known to exhibit a behavior called crown shyness.
