= Anthoshorea stipularis =

- In Sinharaja Forest Reserve

Conservation status
- Vulnerable (IUCN 3.1)

Scientific classification
- Kingdom: Plantae
- Clade: Tracheophytes
- Clade: Angiosperms
- Clade: Eudicots
- Clade: Rosids
- Order: Malvales
- Family: Dipterocarpaceae
- Genus: Anthoshorea
- Species: A. stipularis

Binomial name
- Anthoshorea stipularis (Thwaites) P.S.Ashton & J.Heck. (2022)

Synonyms
- Shorea stipularis Thwaites (1858)

Species of tree

Anthoshorea stipularis is a species of flowering plant in the family Dipterocarpaceae. It is a tree endemic to Sri Lanka.

It grows in remaining lowland evergreen rain forests of southwestern Sri Lanka. It is threatened with habitat loss from the clearance of its native forests for tea plantations. Past selective logging for timber also reduced the species' population.

Leaves

Flowers
