= Diptoindonesin A =

Identifiers
CAS Number	497088-92-3
3D model (JSmol)	Interactive image
PubChem CID	70853657
- InChI: InChI=1S/C34H32O11/c35-15-25-29(41)30(42)31(43)34(44-25)28-24(40)13-18(4-1-16-2-7-20(36)8-3-16)26-27(19-11-22(38)14-23(39)12-19)32(45-33(26)28)17-5-9-21(37)10-6-17/h1-14,25,27,29-32,34-43H,15H2/b4-1+/t25-,27-,29-,30+,31-,32+,34+/m1/s1 Key: YOPYGGKAYWMQAB-APZUKWRQSA-N
- SMILES: C(=C/C1=CC=C(O)C=C1)\C2=C3C(=C(C(O)=C2)[C@@H]4O[C@H](CO)[C@@H](O)[C@H](O)[C@H]4O)O[C@H]([C@@H]3C5=CC(O)=CC(O)=C5)C6=CC=C(O)C=C6

Properties
Chemical formula	C_{34}H_{32}O_{11}
Molar mass	616.61 g/mol
- Except where otherwise noted, data are given for materials in their standard state (at 25 °C [77 °F], 100 kPa). Infobox references

Diptoindonesin A is a C-glucoside of ε-viniferin isolated from the two Dipterocarpaceae Shorea seminis and Dryobalanops aromatica.
