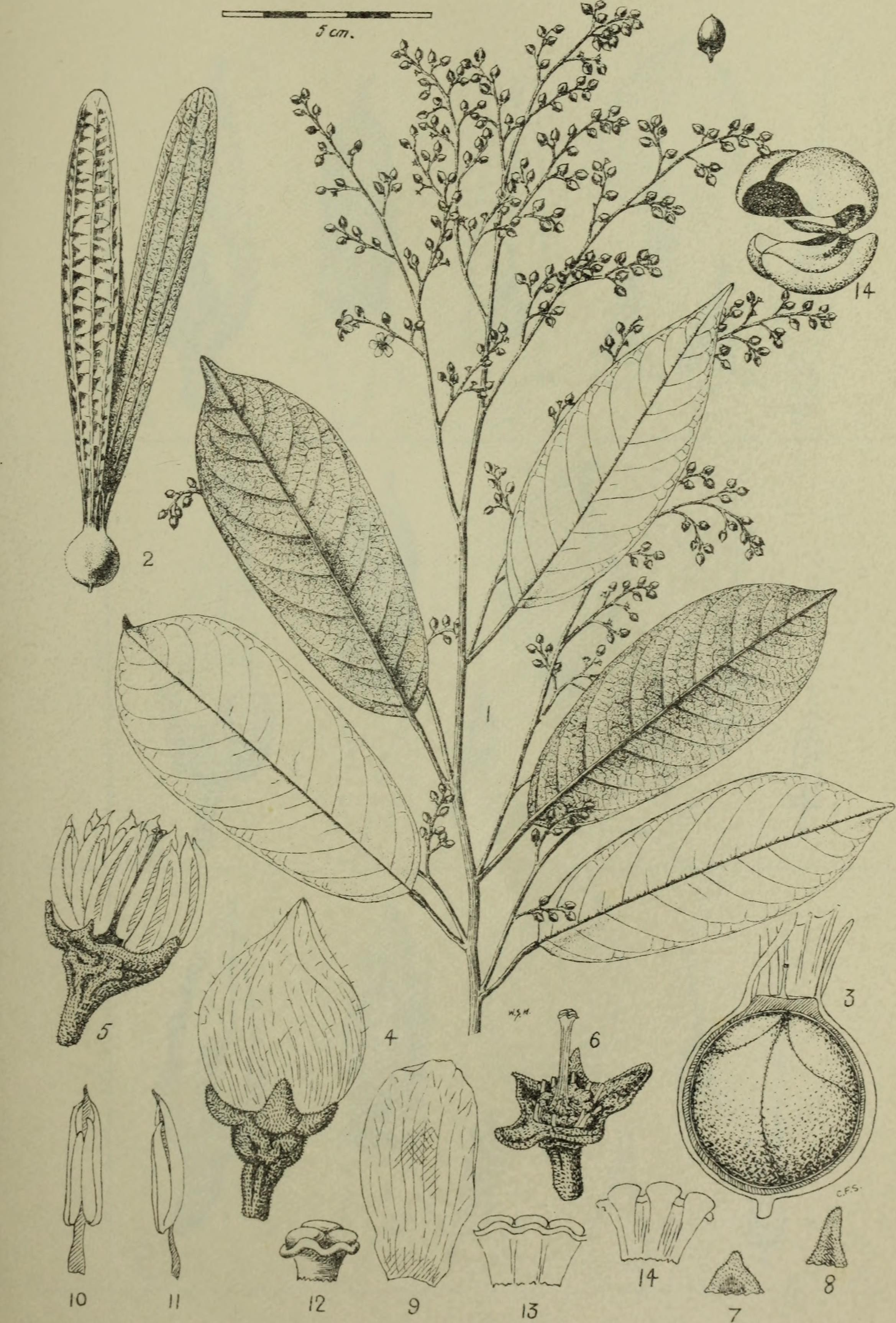
- Botanical drawing, 1913

Conservation status
- Vulnerable (IUCN 3.1)

Scientific classification
- Kingdom: Plantae
- Clade: Embryophytes
- Clade: Tracheophytes
- Clade: Angiosperms
- Clade: Eudicots
- Clade: Rosids
- Order: Malvales
- Family: Dipterocarpaceae
- Genus: Anisoptera
- Species: A. laevis

Binomial name
- Anisoptera laevis Ridl.

= Anisoptera laevis =

Species of tree

Anisoptera laevis is a tree in the family Dipterocarpaceae. The specific epithet laevis means "smooth", referring to the leaves.

== Description ==
Anisoptera laevis grows as an emergent tree up to 65 metres (210 ft) tall, with a trunk diameter of up to 2 m (7 ft). It has buttresses up to 15 m (50 ft) tall and up to 4 m (13 ft) wide. The bark is fissured and flaky. The leaves are oblong to obovate and measure up to 11 cm (4 in) long. The inflorescences measure up to 12 cm (5 in) long and bear yellow flowers.

== Distribution and habitat ==
Anisoptera laevis is native to Thailand, Peninsular Malaysia, Singapore, Sumatra and Borneo. Its habitat is dipterocarp and hill forests, at elevations of 150–900 m (500–3,000 ft).

== Conservation ==
Anisoptera laevis has been assessed as vulnerable on the IUCN Red List. It is threatened by land conversion for agriculture and by logging for its timber (now illegal). The species is found in protected areas throughout its distribution.
