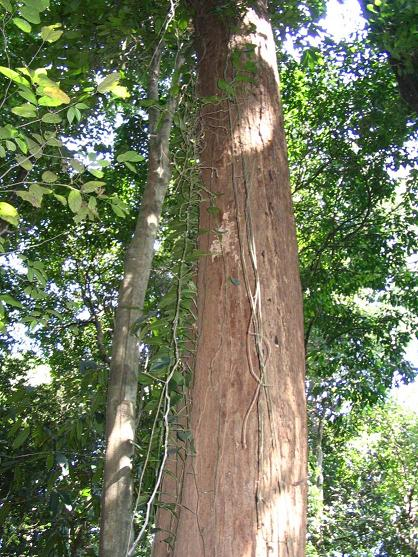

Conservation status
- Endangered (IUCN 3.1)

Scientific classification
- Kingdom: Plantae
- Clade: Tracheophytes
- Clade: Angiosperms
- Clade: Eudicots
- Clade: Rosids
- Order: Malvales
- Family: Dipterocarpaceae
- Genus: Anthoshorea
- Species: A. bracteolata

Binomial name
- Anthoshorea bracteolata (Dyer) P.S.Ashton & J.Heck. (2022)

Synonyms
- Shorea bracteolata Dyer (1874); Shorea foveolata Scort. ex Foxw. (1932)

= Anthoshorea bracteolata =

Species of tree

Anthoshorea bracteolata is a species of plant in the family Dipterocarpaceae. It is a tree native to Peninsular Malaysia, Peninsular Thailand, Singapore, Sumatra, and Borneo.

== Description ==
A. bracteolata a lart tree, growing up to 50 m. The species name bracteolata is derived from Latin (bracteolatus = with bracteoles) and refers to the persistent bracteoles of the inflorescence. The timber is a light hardwood sold under the trade name white meranti.

== Habitat and conservation ==
It grows in mixed dipterocarp forests on well-drained clay and sandy soils. It is an emergent tree, growing above the rainforest canopy. It is threatened by habitat loss.
