= Anthoshorea ochracea =

Conservation status
- Vulnerable (IUCN 3.1)

Scientific classification
- Kingdom: Plantae
- Clade: Tracheophytes
- Clade: Angiosperms
- Clade: Eudicots
- Clade: Rosids
- Order: Malvales
- Family: Dipterocarpaceae
- Genus: Anthoshorea
- Species: A. ochracea

Binomial name
- Anthoshorea ochracea (Symington) P.S.Ashton & J.Heck. (2022)

Synonyms
- Shorea ochracea Symington (1935)

Species of tree

Anthoshorea ochracea is a species of plant in the family Dipterocarpaceae. The species name is derived from Latin (ochraceus = the colour ochre) and refers to the colour of the undersurface of the leaf. A. ochracea is endemic to Borneo.

It is an emergent tree, up to 50 metres (160 ft) tall, in mixed dipterocarp forest on sandy clay soils and clay soils. It is a light hardwood sold under the trade names of white meranti. Shorea ochracea is found in at least two national parks (Betung Kerihun and Bukit Baka Bukit Raya National Parks), but is threatened elsewhere due to conversion of land for palm oil plantations, mining and logging.
