= Anisoptera reticulata =

Conservation status
- Endangered (IUCN 3.1)

Scientific classification
- Kingdom: Plantae
- Clade: Embryophytes
- Clade: Tracheophytes
- Clade: Angiosperms
- Clade: Eudicots
- Clade: Rosids
- Order: Malvales
- Family: Dipterocarpaceae
- Genus: Anisoptera
- Species: A. reticulata

Binomial name
- Anisoptera reticulata P.S.Ashton

Species of tree

Anisoptera reticulata is a tree in the family Dipterocarpaceae. The specific epithet reticulata means "netted", referring to the leaf veins.

== Description ==
Anisoptera reticulata grows up to 65 metres (200 ft) tall, with a trunk diameter of up to 2 m (7 ft). It has buttresses. The bark is fissured and flaky. The leathery leaves are elliptic to obovate and measure up to 13 cm (5 in) long. The inflorescences measure up to 6 cm (2 in) long and bear cream flowers.

== Distribution and habitat ==
Anisoptera reticulata is endemic to Borneo. Its habitat is lowland mixed dipterocarp forests at elevations to 400 m (1,300 ft).

== Conservation ==
Anisoptera reticulata has been assessed as endangered on the IUCN Red List. It is threatened by agricultural plantations and by logging for its timber. The species is found in some protected areas.
