= USS Yacal =

History

United States
- Name: USS Yacal
- Namesake: The yacal, of which the USS Yacal principally was built out of.
- Builder: Cavite Navy Yard, Cavite, the Philippines
- Launched: 15 September 1932
- Completed: 11 November 1932
- Commissioned: 1932
- Stricken: 24 July 1942
- Honours and awards: 1 Battle Stars; American Defense Service Medal; Asiatic-Pacific Campaign Medal; World War II Victory Medal; Philippine Defense Medal
- Fate: Destroyed 2 January 1942

General characteristics
- Type: Ferry
- Displacement: 66 tonnes (65 long tons; 73 short tons)
- Length: 71 ft 0 in (21.64 m)
- Beam: 13 ft 0 in (3.96 m)
- Draft: 8 ft 0 in (2.44 m)
- Propulsion: 1 x steam engine

USS Yacal (YFB-688) was a small ferry that served in the United States Navy from 1932 to 1942. She was named after the yacal tree, which has hard wood, which was also the primary construction material used to build her.

== Construction and design ==
Yacal was constructed in the Philippine Islands by the Cavite Navy Yard. She was launched on 15 September 1932, and completed on 11 November 1932. She was constructed principally of yacal wood and burned coal for fuel. She was 71 ft 0 in (21.64 m) long, 13 ft 0 in (3.96 m) wide, had a draft of 8 ft 0 in (2.44 m), and displaced 66 tonnes (65 long tons; 73 short tons). She was propelled by a steam engine, and had no weapons.

== Service history ==
Yacal was assigned to the 16th Naval District, and based in the Cavite Navy Yard, where she performed yard duties for almost a decade. When Japanese forces invaded the Philippines in December 1941, Yacal was destroyed on 2 January 1942. Records do not indicate whether she was destroyed by her own forces to prevent capture, or else by the Japanese. She was struck from the Navy List on 24 July 1942.

== Awards ==
- American Defense Service Medal
- Asiatic–Pacific Campaign Medal with one battle star
- World War II Victory Medal
- Philippine Defense Medal with service star
