= Shorea seminis =

- Botanical drawing of Isoptera borneensis, 1825

Conservation status
- Least Concern (IUCN 3.1)

Scientific classification
- Kingdom: Plantae
- Clade: Tracheophytes
- Clade: Angiosperms
- Clade: Eudicots
- Clade: Rosids
- Order: Malvales
- Family: Dipterocarpaceae
- Genus: Shorea
- Species: S. seminis

Binomial name
- Shorea seminis (De Vriese) Slooten

Synonyms
- Hopea seminis de Vriese; Isoptera seminis (de Vriese) Burkill; Hopea lanceolata de Vriese; Isoptera borneensis Scheff. ex Burck; Shorea borneensis (Scheff. ex Burck) Pierre; Shorea schefferiana Hance

Species of flowering plant

Shorea seminis is a species of tree in the family Dipterocarpaceae. It is native to Borneo and Palawan.

Diptoindonesin A is a C-glucoside of ε-viniferin isolated from S. seminis.

== See also ==
- List of Shorea species
