= Anisoptera grossivenia =

Conservation status
- Least Concern (IUCN 3.1)

Scientific classification
- Kingdom: Plantae
- Clade: Embryophytes
- Clade: Tracheophytes
- Clade: Angiosperms
- Clade: Eudicots
- Clade: Rosids
- Order: Malvales
- Family: Dipterocarpaceae
- Genus: Anisoptera
- Species: A. grossivenia

Binomial name
- Anisoptera grossivenia Slooten

Species of tree

Anisoptera grossivenia is a tree in the family Dipterocarpaceae, native to Borneo. The specific epithet grossivenia means "veined like unripe fig", referring to the purple veins of the leaf.

== Description ==
Anisoptera grossivenia grows up to 60 metres (200 ft) tall, with a trunk diameter of up to 1.5 m (5 ft). It has buttresses. The bark is fissured and flaky. The blistered leaves are oblong to obovate and measure up to 12 cm (5 in) long. The inflorescences measure up to 20 cm (8 in) long and bear yellow flowers.

== Distribution and habitat ==
Anisoptera grossivenia is endemic to Borneo. Its habitat is in lowland dipterocarp forests.
