= Anisoptera megistocarpa =

Conservation status
- Near Threatened (IUCN 3.1)

Scientific classification
- Kingdom: Plantae
- Clade: Tracheophytes
- Clade: Angiosperms
- Clade: Eudicots
- Clade: Rosids
- Order: Malvales
- Family: Dipterocarpaceae
- Genus: Anisoptera
- Species: A. megistocarpa

Binomial name
- Anisoptera megistocarpa Slooten

Species of tree

Anisoptera megistocarpa is a species of plant in the family Dipterocarpaceae. It is a tree native to Peninsular Thailand, Peninsular Malaysia, Singapore, and Sumatra.

The species was first described by Dirk Fok van Slooten in 1926.
