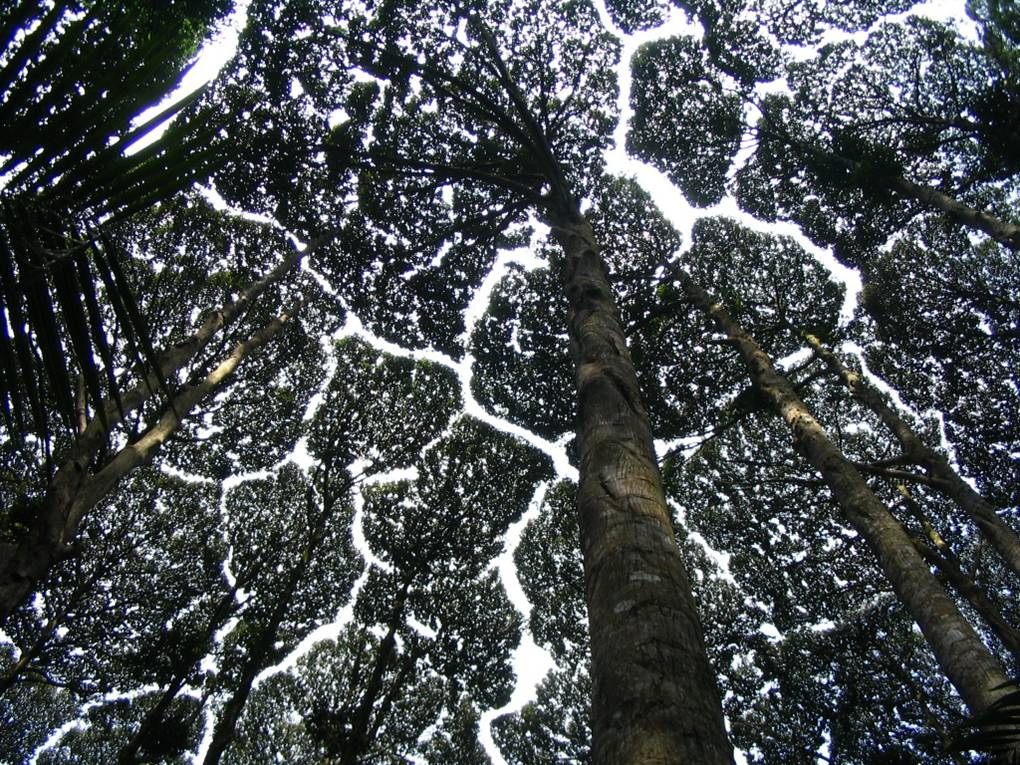
- Dryobalanops aromatica

Scientific classification
- Kingdom: Plantae
- Clade: Tracheophytes
- Clade: Angiosperms
- Clade: Eudicots
- Clade: Rosids
- Order: Malvales
- Family: Dipterocarpaceae
- Subfamily: Dipterocarpoideae
- Genus: Dryobalanops; C.F.Gaertn. (1805)

Species
- Dryobalanops aromatica C.F.Gaertn.; Dryobalanops beccarii Dyer; Dryobalanops fusca Slooten; Dryobalanops keithii Symington; Dryobalanops lanceolata Burck; Dryobalanops oblongifolia Dyer; Dryobalanops rappa Becc.

Synonyms
- Baillonodendron F.Heim (1890)

= Dryobalanops =

Genus of tropical trees

Dryobalanops is a genus of flowering plants and the genus of family Dipterocarpaceae. The name Dryobalanops is derived from Greek (dryas = a nymph associated with oaks and balanops = acorn) and describes the acorn-like nut. The genus has seven species, confined to the tropical forests of western Malesia (Sumatra, Peninsular Malaysia and Borneo). It is among the most abundant species of emergent trees in these forests, growing up to 80 m tall.

The genus is of considerable importance as timber trees and sold under the trade name Kapur. The timber is an important heavy and durable construction timber. D. aromatica was an important source of camphor.

As the trees mature, they mutually avoid touching each other in a phenomenon known as crown shyness.

== See also ==
- Kapur (wood)
