= Cotylelobium lewisianum =

Conservation status
- Critically Endangered (IUCN 3.1)

Scientific classification
- Kingdom: Plantae
- Clade: Tracheophytes
- Clade: Angiosperms
- Clade: Eudicots
- Clade: Rosids
- Order: Malvales
- Family: Dipterocarpaceae
- Genus: Cotylelobium
- Species: C. lewisianum

Binomial name
- Cotylelobium lewisianum (Trimen ex Hook.f.) P.S.Ashton (1972 publ. 1973)

Synonyms
- Stemonoporus lewisianus Trimen ex Hook.f. (1900); Vateria lewisiana (Trimen ex Hook.f.) Alston (1931); Vatica lewisiana (Trimen ex Hook.f.) Livera (1924)

Species of plant

Cotylelobium lewisianum is a species of tree in the Dipterocarpaceae family. It is critically endangered.

== Distribution ==
It is endemic to Sri Lanka.

== Taxonomy ==
It was named by Peter Shaw Ashton in Blumea, 20(2): 358 1972. published in 1973.
