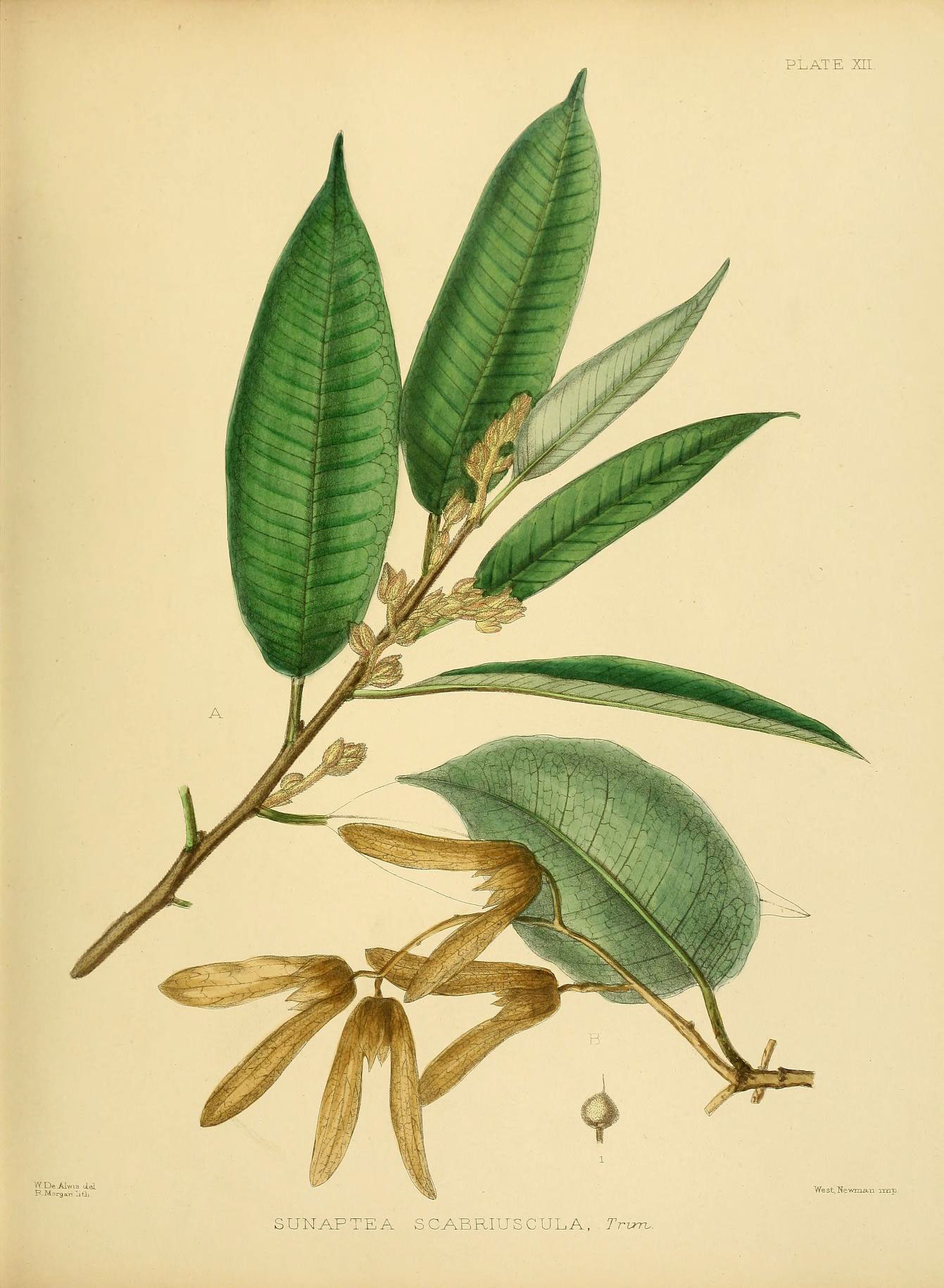

Conservation status
- Endangered (IUCN 3.1)

Scientific classification
- Kingdom: Plantae
- Clade: Tracheophytes
- Clade: Angiosperms
- Clade: Eudicots
- Clade: Rosids
- Order: Malvales
- Family: Dipterocarpaceae
- Genus: Cotylelobium
- Species: C. scabriusculum

Binomial name
- Cotylelobium scabriusculum (Thwaites) Brandis

Synonyms
- Dyerella scabriuscula (Thwaites) F.Heim; Sunaptea scabriuscula (Thwaites) Trimen; Vateria scabriuscula Thwaites (1864) (basionym); Vatica scabriuscula (Thwaites) A.DC.

= Cotylelobium scabriusculum =

Species of flowering plant

Cotylelobium scabriusculum (Sinhalese: Na-mendora) is a species of flowering plant in the family Dipterocarpaceae. It is a tree endemic to southwestern Sri Lanka, where it grows along large streams in lowland wet evergreen rain forest. The tree is threatened by habitat loss from agricultural expansion, and the IUCN assesses the species as Endangered.

The species was first described as Vateria scabriuscula by George Henry Kendrick Thwaites in 1864. In 1895 Dietrich Brandis placed the species in genus Cotylelobium as C. scabriusculum.
