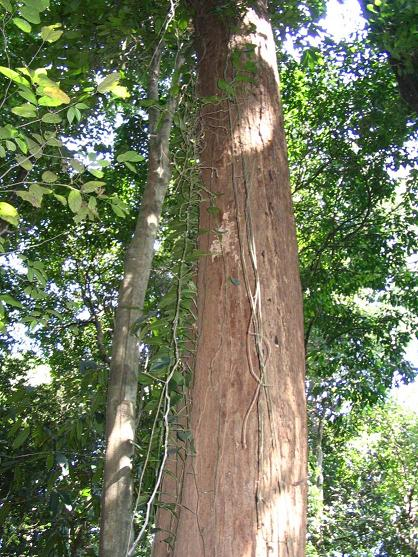
- Anthoshorea bracteolata

Scientific classification
- Kingdom: Plantae
- Clade: Tracheophytes
- Clade: Angiosperms
- Clade: Eudicots
- Clade: Rosids
- Order: Malvales
- Family: Dipterocarpaceae
- Tribe: Shoreae
- Genus: Anthoshorea; Pierre (1891)

Species
- 23; see text

Synonyms
- Saul Roxb. ex Wight & Arn. (1834), not validly publ.

= Anthoshorea =

Genus of tropical trees

Anthoshorea is a genus of flowering plants in the family Dipterocarpaceae. It includes 23 species of trees native to tropical Asia, ranging from India and Sri Lanka to Indochina, south-central China, and Malesia.

The genus corresponds to the 'white meranti' group in the Dipterocarp timber classification system.

== Species ==
22 species are accepted.

- Anthoshorea agamae (G.H.S.Wood ex P.S.Ashton) P.S.Ashton & J.Heck.
- Anthoshorea assamica (Dyer) P.S.Ashton & J.Heck.
- Anthoshorea bentongensis (Foxw.) P.S.Ashton & J.Heck.
- Anthoshorea bracteolata (Dyer) P.S.Ashton & J.Heck.
- Anthoshorea confusa (P.S.Ashton) P.S.Ashton & J.Heck.
- Anthoshorea cordata (P.S.Ashton) P.S.Ashton & J.Heck.
- Anthoshorea dealbata (Foxw.) P.S.Ashton & J.Heck.
- Anthoshorea farinosa (C.E.C.Fisch.) P.S.Ashton & J.Heck.
- Anthoshorea gratissima (Wall. ex Kurz) P.S.Ashton & J.Heck.
- Anthoshorea henryana (Pierre ex Laness.) P.S.Ashton & J.Heck. (unplaced)
- Anthoshorea hulanidda (Kosterm.) P.S.Ashton & J.Heck.
- Anthoshorea hypochra (Hance) P.S.Ashton & J.Heck.
- Anthoshorea javanica (Koord. & Valeton) P.S.Ashton & J.Heck.
- Anthoshorea lamellata (Foxw.) P.S.Ashton & J.Heck.
- Anthoshorea montigena (Slooten) P.S.Ashton & J.Heck.
- Anthoshorea ochracea (Symington) P.S.Ashton & J.Heck.
- Anthoshorea polita (S.Vidal) P.S.Ashton & J.Heck.
- Anthoshorea resinosa (Foxw.) P.S.Ashton & J.Heck.
- Anthoshorea retinodes (Slooten) P.S.Ashton & J.Heck.
- Anthoshorea roxburghii (G.Don) P.S.Ashton & J.Heck.
- Anthoshorea stipularis (Thwaites) P.S.Ashton & J.Heck.
- Anthoshorea symingtonii (G.H.S.Wood) P.S.Ashton & J.Heck.
- Anthoshorea virescens (Parijs) P.S.Ashton & J.Heck.
