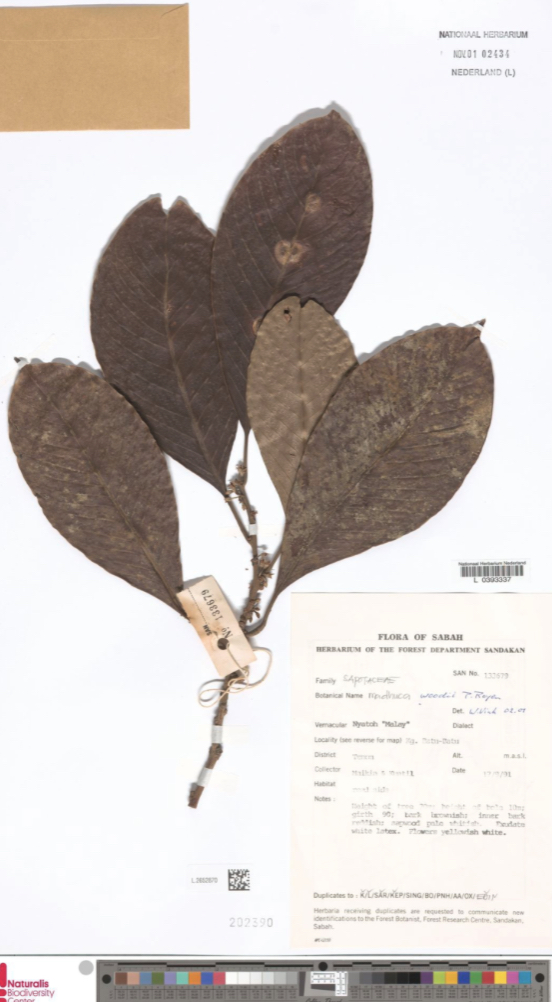

Conservation status
- Vulnerable (IUCN 3.1)

Scientific classification
- Kingdom: Plantae
- Clade: Embryophytes
- Clade: Tracheophytes
- Clade: Angiosperms
- Clade: Eudicots
- Clade: Asterids
- Order: Ericales
- Family: Sapotaceae
- Genus: Madhuca
- Species: M. woodii

Binomial name
- Madhuca woodii P.Royen

= Madhuca woodii =

Species of tree

Madhuca woodii is a tree in the family Sapotaceae. It is named for the botanist Geoffrey Wood.

== Description ==
Madhuca woodii grows up to 20 metres (70 ft) tall, with a trunk diameter of up to 30 cm (12 in). Inflorescences bear up to seven flowers.

== Distribution and habitat ==
Madhuca woodii is endemic to Borneo. Its habitat is mixed dipterocarp forest from 180–810 m (600–2,700 ft) altitude.

== Conservation ==
Madhuca woodii has been assessed as vulnerable on the IUCN Red List. The species is threatened by logging and conversion of land for palm oil plantations.
