= Hopea wyattsmithii =

Conservation status
- Near Threatened (IUCN 3.1)

Scientific classification
- Kingdom: Plantae
- Clade: Embryophytes
- Clade: Tracheophytes
- Clade: Angiosperms
- Clade: Eudicots
- Clade: Rosids
- Order: Malvales
- Family: Dipterocarpaceae
- Genus: Hopea
- Species: H. wyattsmithii

Binomial name
- Hopea wyattsmithii G.H.S.Wood ex P.S.Ashton

Species of tree

Hopea wyattsmithii is a tree in the family Dipterocarpaceae, native to Borneo. It is named for the botanist John Wyatt-Smith.

== Description ==
Hopea wyattsmithii grows below the forest canopy, up to 25 metres (80 ft) tall, with a trunk diameter of up to 30 cm (12 in). It has flying (detached) buttresses and stilt roots. The bark is smooth. The leathery leaves are elliptic to ovate and measure up to 14 cm (5.5 in) long. The inflorescences measure up to 6 cm (2 in) long and bear up to six dark red flowers. The nuts are egg-shaped and measure up to 1.2 cm (0.5 in) long.

== Distribution and habitat ==
Hopea wyattsmithii is endemic to Borneo. Its habitat is mixed dipterocarp forests, to elevations of 200 m (700 ft).

== Conservation ==
Hopea wyattsmithii has been assessed as near threatened on the IUCN Red List. It is threatened by conversion of land for plantations and agriculture. In Sarawak, the species is also threatened by the building of a hydroelectric dam. The species is found in some protected areas.
