= Dammar gum =

Tree resin obtained from the family Dipterocarpaceae

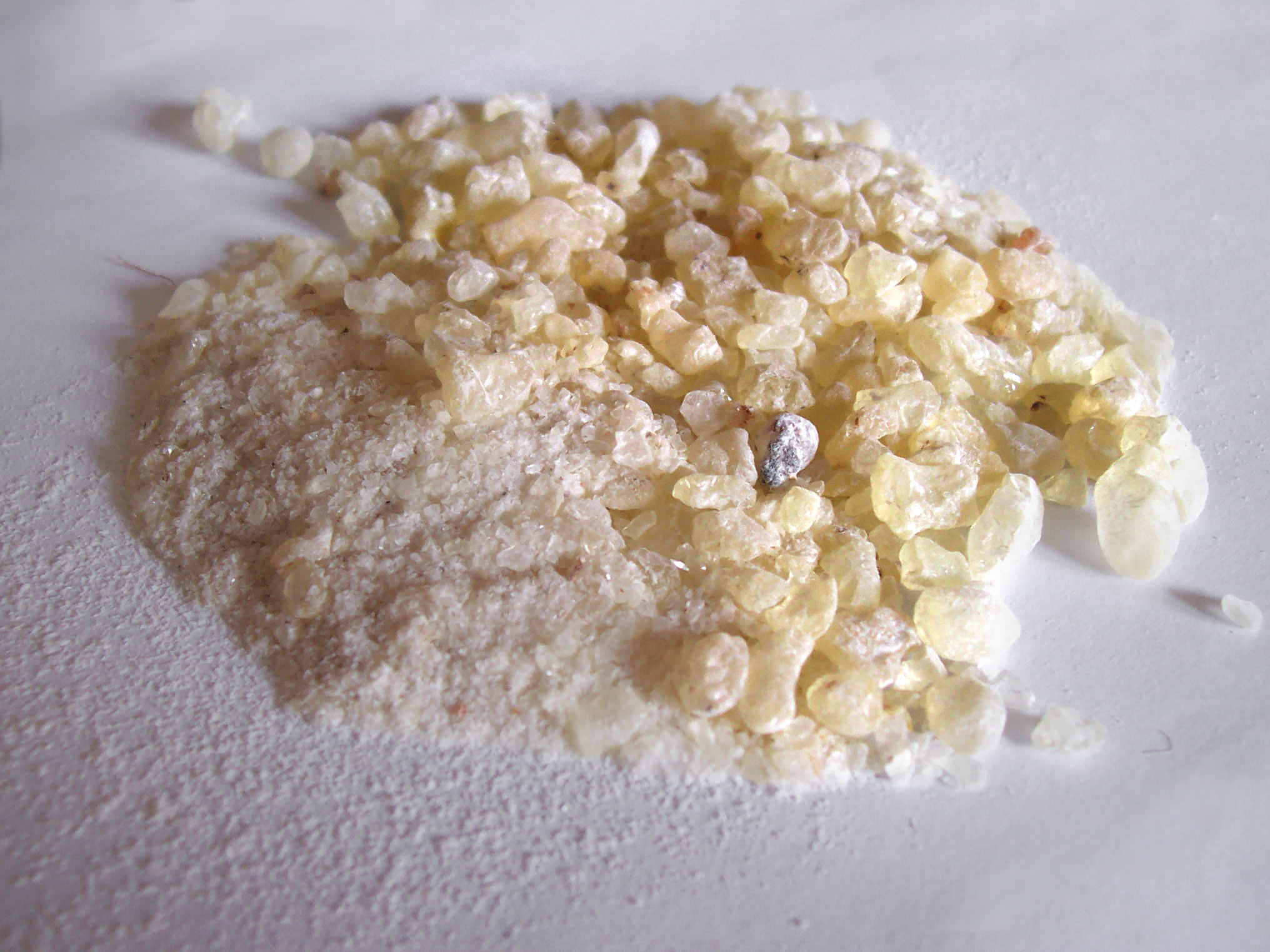
Dammar resin

Dammar gum, also called damar gum, dammar resin, or just dammar, is a resin obtained from the tree family Dipterocarpaceae in India and Southeast Asia, principally those of the genera Shorea or Hopea (synonym Balanocarpus). The resin of some species of Canarium may also be called dammar. Most is produced by tapping trees; however, some is collected in fossilised form on the ground. The resin varies in colour from clear to pale yellow, while the fossilised form is grey-brown. Dammar gum is a triterpenoid resin, containing many triterpenes and their oxidation products. Many of them are low molecular weight compounds (dammarane, dammarenolic acid, oleanane, oleanonic acid, etc.), which easily oxidizes and photoxidizes.

== Types ==
- Damar mata kucing ('cat's eye damar') is a crystalline resin, usually in the form of round balls. Shorea javanica is an important source in Indonesia.
- Damar batu ('stone damar') is stone or pebble-shaped, opaque dammar collected from the ground.
- Damar hitam ('black damar')

== Uses ==
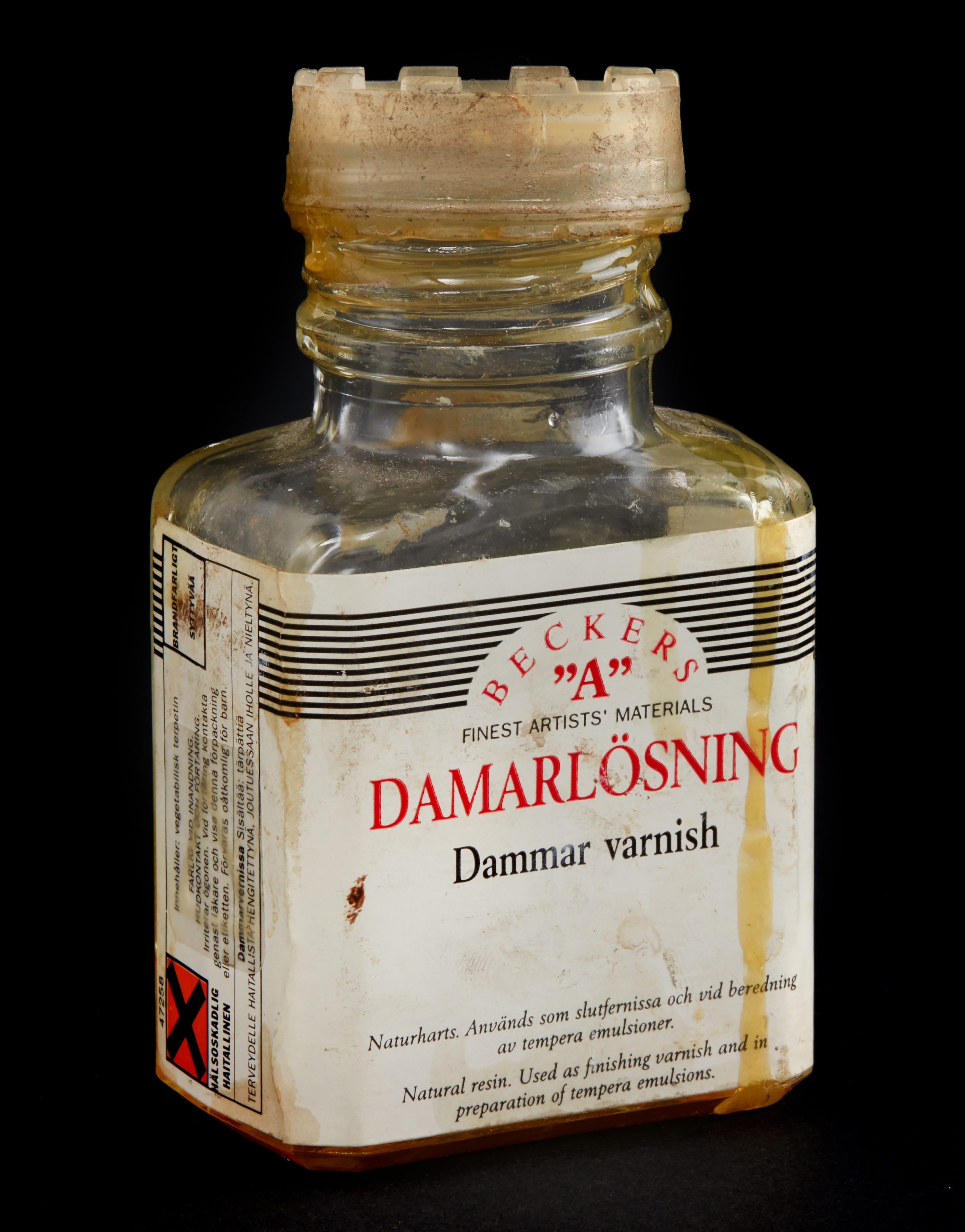
Glass bottle for artist's dammar varnish

- Dammar varnish, made from dammar gum dissolved in turpentine, was introduced as a picture varnish in 1826; commonly used in oil painting, both during the painting process and after the painting is finished. Dammar varnish and similar resin varnishes auto-oxidize and yellow over a relatively short time regardless of storage method; this effect is more pronounced on paintings stored in darkness than with works on display in light due to the bleaching effects of sunlight on the colorants involved.
- Batik is made from dammar crystals dissolved in molten paraffin wax, to prevent the wax from cracking when it is drawn onto silk or rayon.
- Encaustic paints are made from dammar crystals in beeswax with pigment added. The dammar crystals serve as a hardening agent.
- As caulk for ships in the past, frequently with pitch or bitumen.
- As a common mounting material along with canada balsam for preparing biological samples for light microscopy.
- Used in Ayurvedic medicine for various conditions.

== Constituent compounds ==
Fresh dammar gum consists of a mixture of compounds; primarily hydroxydammarenone, dammarenolic acid, and oleanonic aldehyde.

== Material safety ==
=== Physical data ===
- Appearance: white powder
- Melting point: around 120 °C
- Density: 1.04 to 1.12 g/ml
- Refractive index: around 1.5
- CAS number: 9000-16-2
- EINECS: 232-528-4
- Harmonised Tariff: 1301-90

=== Stability and toxicity ===
The resin is stable, probably combustible and incompatible with strong oxidising agents. Its toxicity is low, but inhalation of dust may cause allergies.

== See also ==
- Agathis (Araucariaceae), synonym Dammara
- Canarium strictum (Burseraceae), source of black dammar in South Asia
- Kauri gum, from Agathis australis
- Shorea hypochra (Dipterocarpaceae), source of dammar temak
- Shorea robusta (Dipterocarpaceae), source of sal dammar
- Vateria indica (Dipterocarpaceae), source of white dammar in South Asia
