= Anisoptera aurea =

Conservation status
- Vulnerable (IUCN 3.1)

Scientific classification
- Kingdom: Plantae
- Clade: Tracheophytes
- Clade: Angiosperms
- Clade: Eudicots
- Clade: Rosids
- Order: Malvales
- Family: Dipterocarpaceae
- Genus: Anisoptera
- Species: A. aurea

Binomial name
- Anisoptera aurea Foxw. 1938

Species of flowering plant

Anisoptera aurea is a tree species in the family Dipterocarpaceae. It is a small to large tree endemic to the Philippines (Luzon, Samar, and Negros). No subspecies are listed in the Catalogue of Life. In the Philippines it grows in lowland mixed dipterocarp rain forest, especially on ridges, in the ever-wet zone at 400 meters elevation.
