= Anthoshorea farinosa =

Conservation status
- Endangered (IUCN 3.1)

Scientific classification
- Kingdom: Plantae
- Clade: Tracheophytes
- Clade: Angiosperms
- Clade: Eudicots
- Clade: Rosids
- Order: Malvales
- Family: Dipterocarpaceae
- Genus: Anthoshorea
- Species: A. farinosa

Binomial name
- Anthoshorea farinosa (C.E.C.Fisch.) P.S.Ashton & J.Heck. (2022)

Synonyms
- Shorea farinosa C.E.C.Fisch. (1926)

Species of tree

Anthoshorea farinosa is a tree in the family Dipterocarpaceae. In Khmer it is known as choëm or lumbaô. It grows some 30-45m tall while its trunk may reach 2m in circumference, it occurs in the dense forests of the plains of southern Myanmar, Thailand and Cambodia, while it is cultivated in Vietnam. The wood is in demand for use in construction.
