= Cotylelobium lanceolatum =

Conservation status
- Vulnerable (IUCN 3.1)

Scientific classification
- Kingdom: Plantae
- Clade: Tracheophytes
- Clade: Angiosperms
- Clade: Eudicots
- Clade: Rosids
- Order: Malvales
- Family: Dipterocarpaceae
- Genus: Cotylelobium
- Species: C. lanceolatum

Binomial name
- Cotylelobium lanceolatum Craib

Synonyms
- Cotylelobium malayanum Slooten; Sunaptea lanceolata (Craib) Kosterm.

Species of tree

Cotylelobium lanceolatum is a tree in the family Dipterocarpaceae. The specific epithet lanceolatum means "lance-like", referring to the shape of the leaf.

== Description ==
Cotylelobium lanceolatum grows up to 45 metres (150 ft) tall, with a trunk diameter of up to 1.2 m (4 ft). The leathery leaves are lanceolate to ovate and measure up to 8 cm (3 in) long. The inflorescences measure up to 6 cm (2 in) long and bear cream flowers.

== Distribution and habitat ==
Cotylelobium lanceolatum is native to Thailand, Peninsular Malaysia, Singapore and Borneo. Its habitat is in kerangas areas or above beaches, to 300 m (1,000 ft) elevation, except to 1,500 m (5,000 ft) in Kalimantan.

== Conservation ==
Cotylelobium lanceolatum has been assessed as vulnerable on the IUCN Red List. It is threatened by conversion of land for palm oil plantations and other agriculture. The species is found in some protected areas.
