= Cotylelobium burckii =

Conservation status
- Endangered (IUCN 3.1)

Scientific classification
- Kingdom: Plantae
- Clade: Tracheophytes
- Clade: Angiosperms
- Clade: Eudicots
- Clade: Rosids
- Order: Malvales
- Family: Dipterocarpaceae
- Genus: Cotylelobium
- Species: C. burckii

Binomial name
- Cotylelobium burckii (F.Heim) F.Heim

Synonyms
- Cotylelobium asperum Slooten; Cotylelobium flavum Pierre; Sunaptea burckii (F.Heim) Kosterm.; Vatica burckii F.Heim

Species of tree

Cotylelobium burckii is a species of plant in the family Dipterocarpaceae. The species is named after W. Burck, (1848–1910), a botanist that worked on the Dipterocarpaceae and the Sapotaceae. C. burckii is a canopy tree, up to 40 m, found in kerangas forests on deep white sand podsols. The species is endemic to Borneo. It is found in at least two protected areas (Bako National Park and Gunung Mulu National Park).
