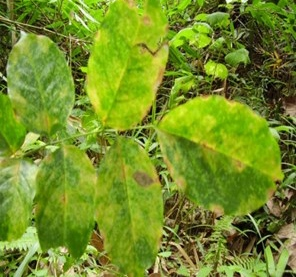

Conservation status
- Least Concern (IUCN 3.1)

Scientific classification
- Kingdom: Plantae
- Clade: Tracheophytes
- Clade: Angiosperms
- Clade: Eudicots
- Clade: Rosids
- Order: Malvales
- Family: Dipterocarpaceae
- Genus: Pentacme
- Species: P. contorta

Binomial name
- Pentacme contorta (S.Vidal) Merr. & Rolfe

Synonyms
- Pentacme mindanensis Foxw.; Pentacme paucinervis Brandis; Shorea contorta S.Vidal

= Pentacme contorta =

Species of tree

Pentacme contorta (called, along with some other species in the genus Shorea, white lauan) is a species of flowering plant in the family Dipterocarpaceae. It is endemic to the Philippines, where it is native to the Babuyan islands (Calayan), Luzon (in most provinces), Polillo, Mindoro, Sibuyan, Marinduque, Masbate, Negros, Leyte, Samar, Mindanao, and Basilan. It is a large canopy tree which grows in lowland semi-evergreen dipterocarp forests up to 985 meters elevation.
