= Dryobalanops oblongifolia =

Conservation status
- Least Concern (IUCN 3.1)

Scientific classification
- Kingdom: Plantae
- Clade: Tracheophytes
- Clade: Angiosperms
- Clade: Eudicots
- Clade: Rosids
- Order: Malvales
- Family: Dipterocarpaceae
- Genus: Dryobalanops
- Species: D. oblongifolia

Binomial name
- Dryobalanops oblongifolia Dyer

Subspecies
- Dryobalanops oblongifolia subsp. oblongifolia; Dryobalanops oblongifolia subsp. occidentalis P.S.Ashton

Species of tree

Dryobalanops oblongifolia is a species of flowering plant in the family Dipterocarpaceae. It is a tree native to Borneo, Peninsular Malaysia, and Sumatra.

The species name is derived from Latin (oblongus = rather long and leaf (folium = leaf); and refers to the shape of the leaf.

== Description ==
Both produce heavy hardwood timber, which is sold under the trade name of Kapur.

=== Subspecies ===
There are two subspecies:

- Dryobalanops oblongifolia subsp. oblongifolia (synonym = Baillonodendron malayanum F.Heim) is endemic to the island of Borneo. It is found in at least one protected area (Kubah National Park), but is threatened elsewhere due to habitat loss. It is an emergent tree, up to 60 m tall, found in mixed dipterocarp forest on sandy clay soils.
- Dryobalanops oblongifolia subsp. occidentalis P.S.Ashton (synonyms = Dryobalanops beccariana Ridl. & Dryobalanops ovalifolia Burkill) — found in Sumatra and Peninsular Malaysia.
