= Dryobalanops rappa =

Conservation status
- Endangered (IUCN 3.1)

Scientific classification
- Kingdom: Plantae
- Clade: Tracheophytes
- Clade: Angiosperms
- Clade: Eudicots
- Clade: Rosids
- Order: Malvales
- Family: Dipterocarpaceae
- Genus: Dryobalanops
- Species: D. rappa

Binomial name
- Dryobalanops rappa Becc.

Species of tree

Dryobalanops rappa is a species of plant in the family Dipterocarpaceae. The species name is derived from Iban (kerapa = a shallow swamp) and refers to the species habitat. This species is endemic to Borneo. It is found in at least one protected area (Gunung Mulu National Park), but is threatened elsewhere due to habitat loss. The IUCN has assessed the species as endangered due to habitat damage by deforestation, mining, agriculture and fires.

It is an emergent tree, up to 55 m tall, found in coastal mixed peat swamp forest and in lower montane kerangas forests. It is a heavy hardwood sold under the trade names of Kapur.

First fossilized remains of this species were published in 2025. They are at least 2 million years old fossilized leaves found in Borneo.
