= Anthoshorea hypochra =

Conservation status
- Endangered (IUCN 3.1)

Scientific classification
- Kingdom: Plantae
- Clade: Tracheophytes
- Clade: Angiosperms
- Clade: Eudicots
- Clade: Rosids
- Order: Malvales
- Family: Dipterocarpaceae
- Genus: Anthoshorea
- Species: A. hypochra

Binomial name
- Anthoshorea hypochra (Hance) P.S.Ashton & J.Heck. (2022)

Synonyms
- Shorea crassifolia Ridl. (1922); Shorea hypochra Hance (1876); Shorea maritima Pierre ex Laness. (1886)

Species of tree

Anthoshorea hypochra called, along with some other species in the genus Anthoshorea, white meranti, is a species of tree in the family Dipterocarpaceae. It grows naturally in Cambodia, Sumatra, Laos, Peninsular Malaysia, Thailand, and Vietnam.

== Description ==
A very large tree up to 60 m tall with bole branchless for 24–30 m and up to 165 cm in diameter; leaves ovate to elliptical, 7–18 cm x 4.5–8 cm, thickly leathery, with 15-20 pairs of secondary veins, lower surface cream lepidote, petiole 2–4 cm long; stamens 15, stylopidium absent; larger fruit calyx lobes up to 17 cm x 2.6 cm. The density of the wood is 530–865 kg/mᶟ at 15% moisture content.

== Range and habitat ==
The species ranges from Indo-China to Peninsular Malaysia and the Riau and Lingga archipelagoes. A. hypochra occurs on flat and undulating land near the coast or in seasonal dipterocarp forest at low latitude.

== Uses ==
The timber is used as white meranti. A dammar of good quality ('dammar temak') has been yielded on a commercial scale.
