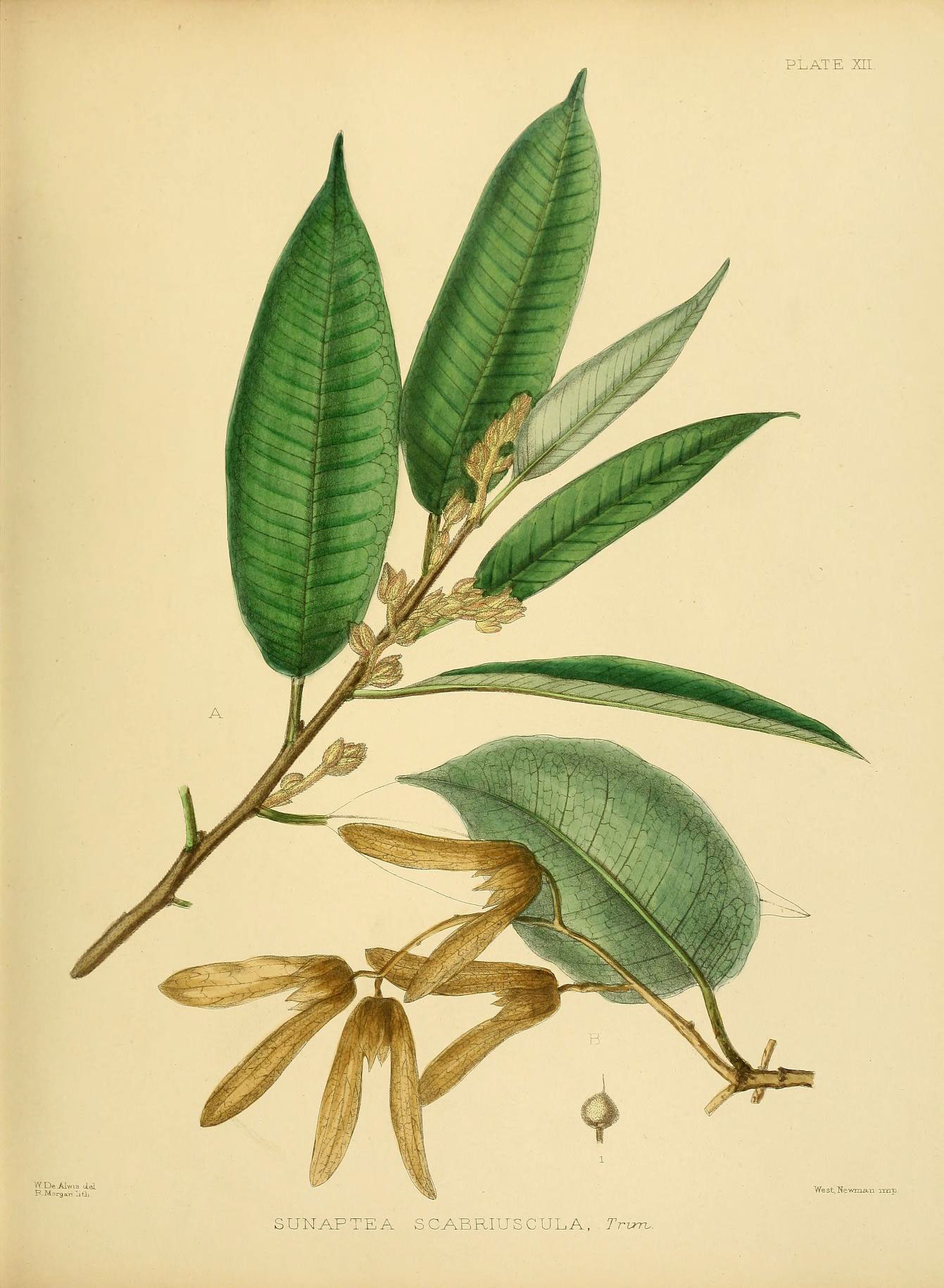
- Cotylelobium scabriusculum as illustrated in A hand-book to the flora of Ceylon

Scientific classification
- Kingdom: Plantae
- Clade: Tracheophytes
- Clade: Angiosperms
- Clade: Eudicots
- Clade: Rosids
- Order: Malvales
- Family: Dipterocarpaceae
- Genus: Cotylelobium; Pierre

Species
- See text

= Cotylelobium =

Genus of tropical trees

Cotylelobium is a genus of plants in the family Dipterocarpaceae. The name Cotylelobium is derived from Greek (kotyle = a small cup and lobos = a pod) and describes the receptacle. It contains five species distributed in Sri Lanka, Peninsular Thailand, Sumatra, Peninsular Malaysia and Borneo. All five species are listed on the IUCN redlist, as either vulnerable, endangered or critically endangered.

== Species ==
As of September 2021, Plants of the World Online accepts the following species:

- Cotylelobium burckii (F.Heim) F.Heim
- Cotylelobium lanceolatum Craib
- Cotylelobium lewisianum (Trimen ex Hook.f.) P.S.Ashton
- Cotylelobium melanoxylon (Hook.f.) Pierre
- Cotylelobium scabriusculum (Thwaites) Brandis
