= Dryobalanops beccarii =

- Specimen

Conservation status
- Least Concern (IUCN 3.1)

Scientific classification
- Kingdom: Plantae
- Clade: Tracheophytes
- Clade: Angiosperms
- Clade: Eudicots
- Clade: Rosids
- Order: Malvales
- Family: Dipterocarpaceae
- Genus: Dryobalanops
- Species: D. beccarii

Binomial name
- Dryobalanops beccarii Dyer

Synonyms
- Dryobalanops oiocarpa Slooten; Dryobalanops oocarpa Slooten

Species of flowering plant

Dryobalanops beccarii, or kapur merah, is a species of plant in the family Dipterocarpaceae. It is named after Odoardo Beccari (1843–1920), an Italian explorer and botanist. The species is found in Peninsular Malaysia and Borneo. It grows as a large emergent tree, up to 65 m (210 ft) tall, and is found in mixed dipterocarp forests on shallow leached soils over both sandstone and shale. Its heavy hardwood is sold under the trade names of kapur. Dryobalanops beccarii is recorded from a number of protected areas including Bako, Gunung Gading, Kubah and Santubong national parks.
