= Ε-Viniferin =

ε-Viniferin
- (−)-trans-ε-Viniferin

Names
- Preferred IUPAC name 5-{{#parsoidfragment:0}}{(2R,3R)-6-Hydroxy-2-(4-hydroxyphenyl)-4-[(E)-2-(4-hydroxyphenyl)ethen-1-yl]-2,3-dihydro-1-benzofuran-3-yl}benzene-1,3-diol
- Other names Viniferin epsilon-Viniferin (−)-epsilon-Viniferin (−)-(E)-epsilon-viniferin trans-ε-viniferin (−)-Trans-epsilon-viniferin; Iso-[epsilon]-viniferin cis-ε-viniferin Cis-epsilon-viniferin

Identifiers
CAS Number	62218-08-0
3D model (JSmol)	Interactive image
ChEMBL	ChEMBL1224875
ChemSpider	4445043
PubChem CID	5281728
UNII	0K8Z2K6Y7O
- InChI: InChI=1S/C28H22O6/c29-20-7-2-16(3-8-20)1-4-18-11-24(33)15-25-26(18)27(19-12-22(31)14-23(32)13-19)28(34-25)17-5-9-21(30)10-6-17/h1-15,27-33H/b4-1+/t27-,28+/m1/s1 Key: FQWLMRXWKZGLFI-YVYUXZJTSA-N; InChI=1/C28H22O6/c29-20-7-2-16(3-8-20)1-4-18-11-24(33)15-25-26(18)27(19-12-22(31)14-23(32)13-19)28(34-25)17-5-9-21(30)10-6-17/h1-15,27-33H/b4-1+/t27-,28+/m1/s1 Key: FQWLMRXWKZGLFI-YVYUXZJTBS
- SMILES: C1=CC(=CC=C1C=CC2=CC(=CC3=C2C(C(O3)C4=CC=C(C=C4)O)C5=CC(=CC(=C5)O)O)O)O

Properties
Chemical formula	C_{28}H_{22}O_{6}
Molar mass	454.478 g·mol^{−1}
- Except where otherwise noted, data are given for materials in their standard state (at 25 °C [77 °F], 100 kPa). verify (what is ?) Infobox references

ε-Viniferin is a naturally occurring polyphenol, belonging to the stilbenoids family. It is a resveratrol dimer.

It is found in Vitis vinifera grapevines, in wines, in the Oriental medicinal plant Vitis coignetiae and in the stem bark of Dryobalanops aromatica.
Cis-epsilon-viniferin can be found in Paeonia lactiflora.

It shows a human cytochrome P450 enzymes inhibition activity.

== Glycosides ==
Diptoindonesin A is a C-glucoside of ε-viniferin.

== See also ==
- Phenolic content in wine
