= Shorea maxwelliana =

- In Labu, Malaysia

Conservation status
- Near Threatened (IUCN 3.1)

Scientific classification
- Kingdom: Plantae
- Clade: Tracheophytes
- Clade: Angiosperms
- Clade: Eudicots
- Clade: Rosids
- Order: Malvales
- Family: Dipterocarpaceae
- Genus: Shorea
- Species: S. maxwelliana

Binomial name
- Shorea maxwelliana King

Synonyms
- Shorea alba Ridl.; Shorea barbata Brandis; Shorea utilis King

Species of flowering plant

Shorea maxwelliana is a species of flowering plant in the family Dipterocarpaceae. It is a tree native to Borneo, Peninsular Malaysia, and Sumatra. It is a large tree with a large, loose, cauliflower-shaped crown which can grow up to 50 metres tall with a straight, cylindrical bole up to 160 cm in diameter. It grows in lowland mixed dipterocarp rain forest on low hills in well-drained clay-rich soils up to 700 metres elevation. It is threatened by habitat loss, and the IUCN Red List assesses the species as near threatened.
