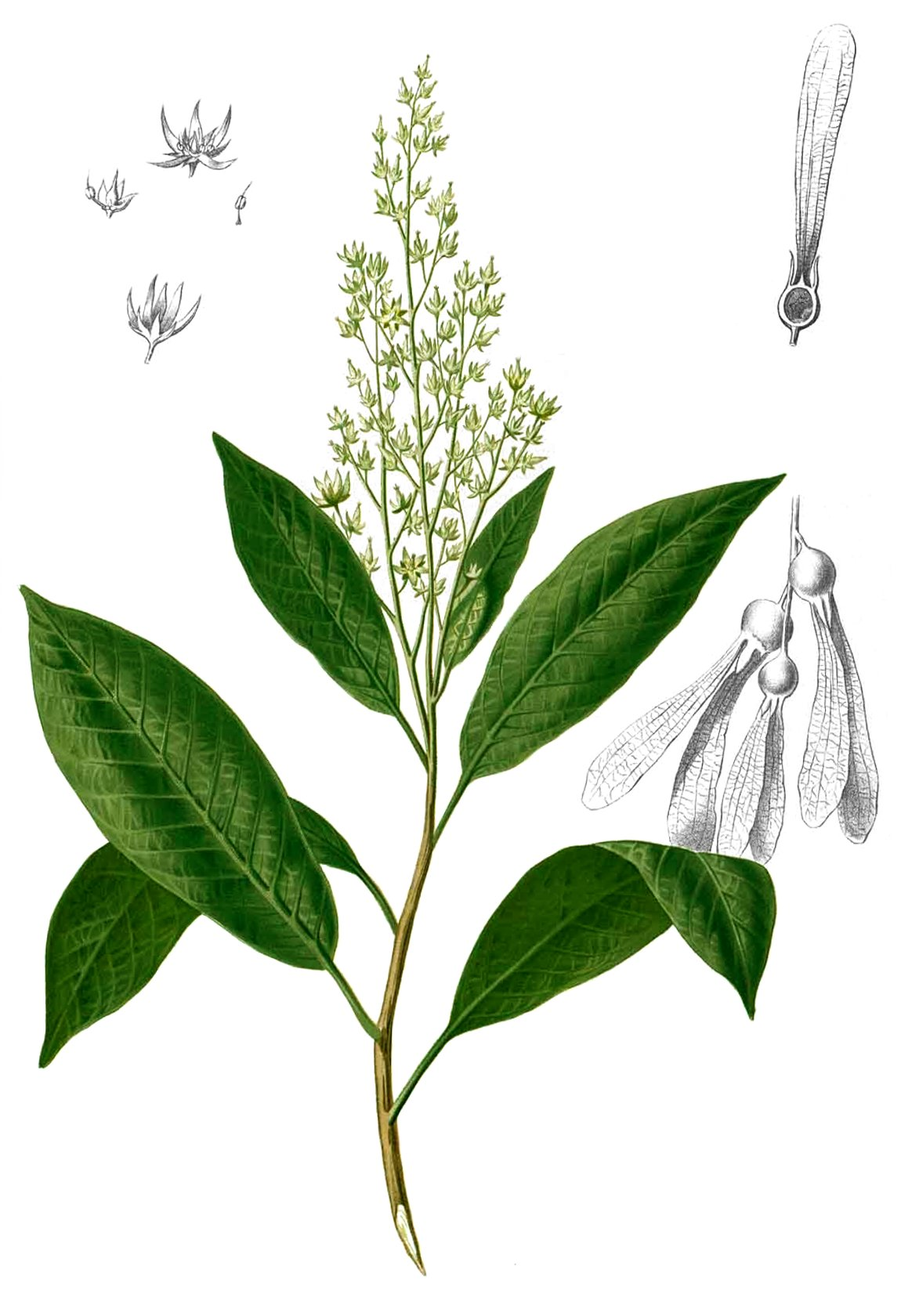

Conservation status
- Vulnerable (IUCN 3.1)

Scientific classification
- Kingdom: Plantae
- Clade: Embryophytes
- Clade: Tracheophytes
- Clade: Angiosperms
- Clade: Eudicots
- Clade: Rosids
- Order: Malvales
- Family: Dipterocarpaceae
- Genus: Anisoptera
- Species: A. thurifera

Binomial name
- Anisoptera thurifera (Blanco) Blume

Synonyms
- List: *Anisoptera brunnea Foxw.; *Anisoptera calophylla G.Perkins; *Anisoptera lanceolata (Turcz.) Walp.; *Anisoptera tomentosa Brandis; *Anisoptera vidaliana Brandis; *Antherotriche lanceolata Turcz.; *Dipterocarpus thurifer Blanco; *Hopea laevis Buch.-Ham.; *Hopea trinervis Buch.-Ham.; *Mocanera thurifera Blanco; *Shorea mayapis Blume

= Anisoptera thurifera =

Species of tree

Anisoptera thurifera is a tree species in the family Dipterocarpaceae. It is native to the Philippines, Maluku Islands, Sulawesi, and New Guinea. The IUCN has assessed it as Vulnerable.

== Subspecies ==
The Catalogue of Life lists two subspecies:

- Anisoptera thurifera subsp. polyandra (Blume) P.S.Ashton
- Anisoptera thurifera subsp. thurifera
