= Anthoshorea virescens =

Conservation status
- Endangered (IUCN 3.1)

Scientific classification
- Kingdom: Plantae
- Clade: Tracheophytes
- Clade: Angiosperms
- Clade: Eudicots
- Clade: Rosids
- Order: Malvales
- Family: Dipterocarpaceae
- Genus: Anthoshorea
- Species: A. virescens

Binomial name
- Anthoshorea virescens (Parijs) P.S.Ashton & J.Heck. (2022)

Synonyms
- Shorea virescens Parijs (1933)

Species of tree

Anthoshorea virescens is a species of plant in the family Dipterocarpaceae. The inference of the species name, derived from Latin (virescens = becoming green), is unclear. It is native to Borneo and to Samar and Mindanao in the Philippines.

== Description ==
It is an emergent tree, up to 50 metres (160 ft) tall, in mixed dipterocarp forest on clay soils.

Anthoshorea virescens is found in at least two protected areas (Lambir & Gunung Mulu National Parks), but is threatened elsewhere due to habitat loss.

== Wood ==
It is a light hardwood sold under the trade names of white meranti.
