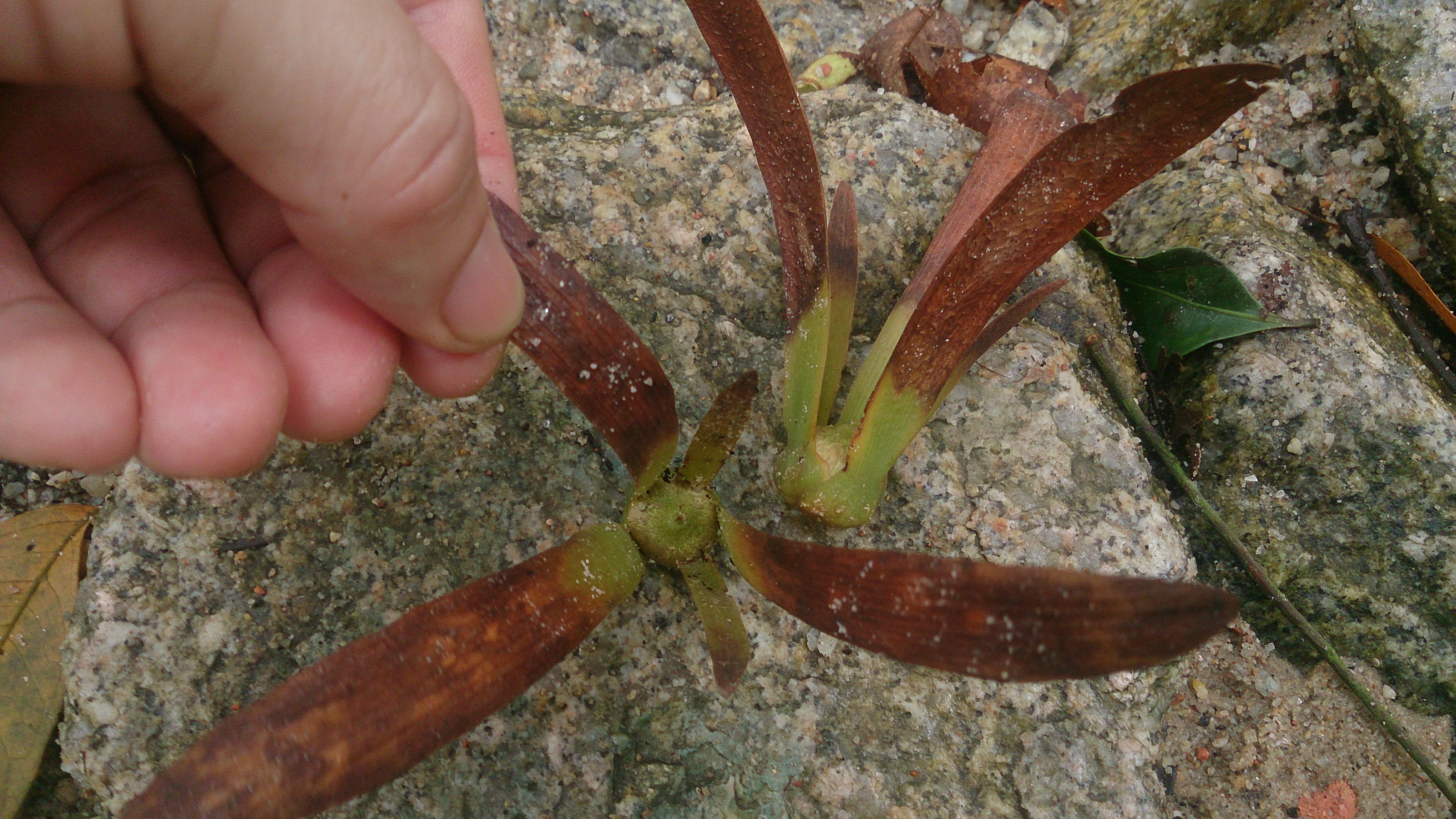
- Fruits

Conservation status
- Least Concern (IUCN 3.1)

Scientific classification
- Kingdom: Plantae
- Clade: Tracheophytes
- Clade: Angiosperms
- Clade: Eudicots
- Clade: Rosids
- Order: Malvales
- Family: Dipterocarpaceae
- Genus: Dryobalanops
- Species: D. lanceolata

Binomial name
- Dryobalanops lanceolata Burck

Synonyms
- Dryobalanops kayanensis Becc.

= Dryobalanops lanceolata =

Species of tree

Dryobalanops lanceolata is a species of plant in the family Dipterocarpaceae. The species name is derived from Latin (lanceolatus = shaped like the head of a spear) and refers to the shape of the leaf. This species is endemic to Borneo. It is common in protected areas, although elsewhere it has suffered modest population decline due to logging and land conversion.

It is an immense emergent tree, up to 80 m tall, found in mixed dipterocarp forest on clay-rich soils. It is a heavy hardwood sold under the timber trade name kapur.
