= Anthoshorea resinosa =

Conservation status
- Vulnerable (IUCN 3.1)

Scientific classification
- Kingdom: Plantae
- Clade: Tracheophytes
- Clade: Angiosperms
- Clade: Eudicots
- Clade: Rosids
- Order: Malvales
- Family: Dipterocarpaceae
- Genus: Anthoshorea
- Species: A. resinosa

Binomial name
- Anthoshorea resinosa (Foxw.) P.S.Ashton & J.Heck. (2022)

Synonyms
- Shorea resinosa Foxw. (1932)

Species of flowering plant

Anthoshorea resinosa (called, along with some other species in the genus Anthoshorea, white meranti) is a species of plant in the family Dipterocarpaceae. It is a tree found in Sumatra, Peninsular Malaysia, and Borneo.
