= Pentacme siamensis =

Conservation status
- Least Concern (IUCN 3.1)

Scientific classification
- Kingdom: Plantae
- Clade: Tracheophytes
- Clade: Angiosperms
- Clade: Eudicots
- Clade: Rosids
- Order: Malvales
- Family: Dipterocarpaceae
- Genus: Pentacme
- Species: P. siamensis

Binomial name
- Pentacme siamensis (Miq.) Kurz

Synonyms
- Hopea suavis Wall.; Pentacme malayana King; Pentacme siamensis var. laevis Pierre; Pentacme siamensis var. mekongensis (Pierre ex Laness.) H.P.Guérin; Pentacme suavis A.DC.; Pentacme suavis var. obtusifolia F.Heim; Pentacme suavis var. siamensis (Miq.) Smitinand; Pentacme suavis var. tomentosa (Craib) Smitinand; Pentacme tomentosa Craib; Shorea bracteata Pierre ex Laness.; Shorea mekongensis Pierre ex Laness.; Shorea siamensis Miq.; Shorea siamensis var. mekongensis (Pierre ex Laness.) Y.K.Yang & J.K.Wu; Shorea siamensis var. tomentosa (Craib) Smitinand; Shorea suavis (A.DC.) Pierre ex Laness.; Shorea tomentosa Pierre; Vateria siamensis (Miq.) Burck

Species of tree native to Southeast Asia

Pentacme siamensis is a species of tree in the family Dipterocarpaceae. It is native to most of mainland Southeast Asia.

== Uses ==
In Cambodia, Pentacme siamensis (known in Khmer as រាំងភ្នំ – Raing Phnom) is rare and most often seen near Buddhist pagodas and shrines. According to legend one of Buddha's incarnations was born under an P. siamensis tree and therefore it has a strong symbolic connection to Cambodia's Buddhist culture. The leaves of the tree are used in traditional Cambodian medicine as a tea for easing child birth.
