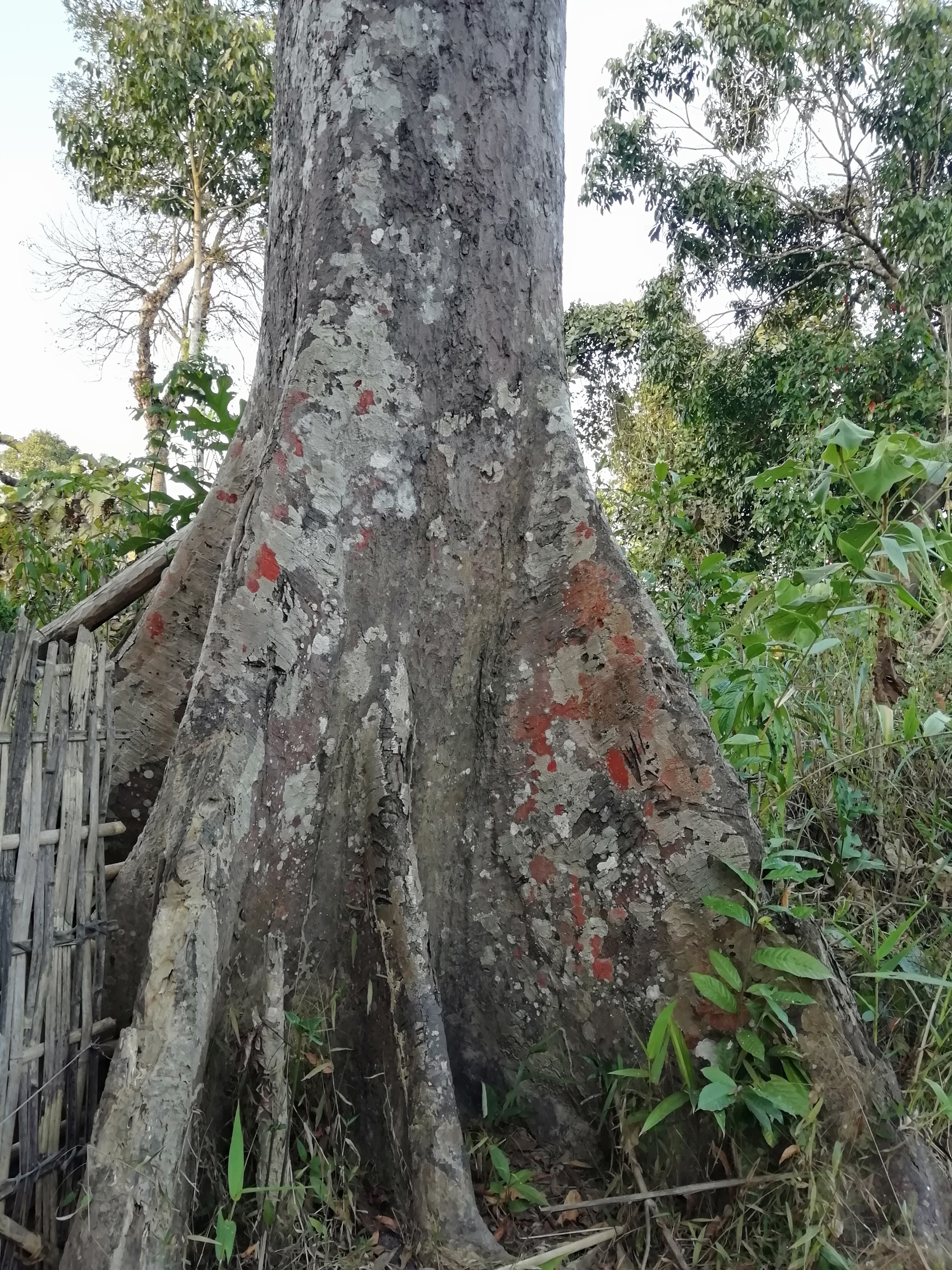
- In Bangladesh

Conservation status
- Endangered (IUCN 3.1)

Scientific classification
- Kingdom: Plantae
- Clade: Tracheophytes
- Clade: Angiosperms
- Clade: Eudicots
- Clade: Rosids
- Order: Malvales
- Family: Dipterocarpaceae
- Genus: Anisoptera
- Species: A. scaphula

Binomial name
- Anisoptera scaphula (Roxb.) Pierre

Synonyms
- Anisoptera glabra Kurz; Hopea scaphula Roxb. (1832) (basionym); Hopeoides scaphula (Roxb.) Cretz.; Scaphula glabra (Kurz) R.Parker; Vatica scaphula (Roxb.) Dyer

= Anisoptera scaphula =

Species of tree

Anisoptera scaphula is a species of plant in the family Dipterocarpaceae. It is native to Bangladesh, Peninsular Malaysia, Laos, Myanmar and Thailand.

== Description ==
Anisoptera scaphula is a tall tree, reaching a height of 30–45 m (98–148 ft) and a girth of 3–4.5 m (9.8–14.8 ft). The trunk is prominently buttressed. It occurs on almost flat areas, on undulating land and in valleys at elevations between sea level and 700 m, and is shade tolerant in youth. Its timber is used for general light construction.

== Conservation ==
Anisoptera scaphula has been assessed as Endangered on the IUCN Red List. The species is threatened by logging for timber and conversion of forests for agriculture. In Thailand and Malaysia, the species is not found outside of protected areas.
