= Dryobalanops keithii =

Conservation status
- Vulnerable (IUCN 3.1)

Scientific classification
- Kingdom: Plantae
- Clade: Tracheophytes
- Clade: Angiosperms
- Clade: Eudicots
- Clade: Rosids
- Order: Malvales
- Family: Dipterocarpaceae
- Genus: Dryobalanops
- Species: D. keithii

Binomial name
- Dryobalanops keithii Symington

Species of tree

Dryobalanops keithii is a species of plant in the family Dipterocarpaceae. The species is named after H.G. Keith, 1899–1982, a Conservator of Forests in North Borneo (now Sabah). This species is endemic to Borneo, where it is threatened due to habitat loss. It is a main canopy to low emergent tree, up to 40 m tall, found in mixed dipterocarp forest on well-drained but moist clay soils. It is a heavy hardwood sold under the trade names of Kapur.
