= Anthoshorea gratissima =

Conservation status
- Endangered (IUCN 3.1)

Scientific classification
- Kingdom: Plantae
- Clade: Tracheophytes
- Clade: Angiosperms
- Clade: Eudicots
- Clade: Rosids
- Order: Malvales
- Family: Dipterocarpaceae
- Genus: Anthoshorea
- Species: A. gratissima

Binomial name
- Anthoshorea gratissima (Wall. ex Kurz) P.S.Ashton & J.Heck. (2022)

Synonyms
- Hopea gratissima Wall. ex Kurz (1873); Shorea gratissima (Wall. ex Kurz) Dyer (1874)

Species of tree

Anthoshorea gratissima is a species of tree in the family Dipterocarpaceae. It is native to Sumatra, Borneo, Peninsular Malaysia, Singapore, Myanmar and Thailand.
