= Anthoshorea symingtonii =

Conservation status
- Vulnerable (IUCN 3.1)

Scientific classification
- Kingdom: Plantae
- Clade: Tracheophytes
- Clade: Angiosperms
- Clade: Eudicots
- Clade: Rosids
- Order: Malvales
- Family: Dipterocarpaceae
- Genus: Anthoshorea
- Species: A. symingtonii

Binomial name
- Anthoshorea symingtonii (G.H.S.Wood) P.S.Ashton & J.Heck. (2022)

Synonyms
- Shorea symingtonii G.H.S.Wood (1960)

Species of tree

Anthoshorea symingtonii (also called white meranti) is a species of plant in the family Dipterocarpaceae. It is endemic to eastern Sabah in Malaysian Borneo.

It is a large emergent tree, growing up to 50 meters tall with a trunk up to 1.5 metres in diameter.

Anthoshorea symingtonii is native to eastern and southeastern parts Sabah, including Kinabatangan, Lahad Datu, Sandakan, Semporna and Tawau districts. It is found in Kinabalu Park and Lingkabau Forest Reserve.

It grows scattered in undulating lowland and hill mixed dipterocarp forest on clay-rich soils, up to 721 metres elevation.

The species was first described as Shorea symingtonii by Geoffrey Wood in 1960. The specific epithet symingtonii honors botanist Colin Fraser Symington (1905–1943), an expert in dipterocarps. In 2022 Peter Shaw Ashton and Jacqueline Heckenhauer placed the species in genus Anthoshorea as A. symingtonii.
