= Geoffrey Wood (botanist) =

English botanist

Geoffrey Howorth Spencer Wood (1927, Vowchurch, Herefordshire, England – 1957, Kuala Belait, Borneo (now Brunei)) was an English botanist. He obtained an MA in botany and forestry from Oxford University in 1952. In 1954 he became Curator at the Sandakan Herbarium in present-day Sabah. His main area of interest was trees in the family Dipterocarpaceae. He died in 1957 from injuries suffered in a fuel explosion on a botanical expedition in the Andulau Hills of Brunei.

Wood named several plant species, including Hopea wyattsmithii and Shorea symingtonii. The species Shorea woodii and Madhuca woodii are named for him.

== Works ==
- Wood, G.H.S.; J. Agama (1956). Check List of the Forest Flora of North Borneo. North Borneo Forest Records No. 6. Forest Department, Sandakan.
- Meijer, W.; G.H.S. Wood (1964). Dipterocarps of Sabah (North Borneo). Sabah Forest Records No. 5. Forest Department, Sandakan.
