= Dryobalanops fusca =

Conservation status
- Critically Endangered (IUCN 3.1)

Scientific classification
- Kingdom: Plantae
- Clade: Tracheophytes
- Clade: Angiosperms
- Clade: Eudicots
- Clade: Rosids
- Order: Malvales
- Family: Dipterocarpaceae
- Genus: Dryobalanops
- Species: D. fusca

Binomial name
- Dryobalanops fusca Slooten

Species of tree

Dryobalanops fusca is a species of plant in the family Dipterocarpaceae. It is native to Borneo.

== Description ==
Dryobalanops fusca grows as a tree up to 60 m (200 ft) tall, with a trunk diameter of up to 1.5 m (5 ft). The dark brown bark is flaky. The leathery leaves are lanceolate and measure up to 10 cm (4 in) long and to 4 cm (1.6 in) wide.The inflorescences feature lanceolate flowers.

== Taxonomy ==
Dryobalanops fusca was first described in 1932 by Dutch botanist Dirk Fok van Slooten in the Bulletin du Jardin Botanique de Buitenzorg. The type specimen was collected in Kalimantan in Borneo. The specific epithet fusca means 'dark-coloured', referring to the indumentum.

== Distribution and habitat ==
Dryobalanops fusca is endemic to Borneo. Its habitat is in kerangas forests and on beaches and lowland ridges, to elevations of about 200 m (700 ft).

== Conservation ==
Dryobalanops fusca has been assessed as critically endangered on the IUCN Red List. Its habitat is threatened by conversion of land for agriculture and plantations. The species is harvested for its timber. In Kalimantan, it is threatened by forest fires. The species is not known from any protected areas.

== Uses ==
Dryobalanops fusca is a heavy hardwood sold under the trade name of kapur. The timber is locally used in construction. It is also used in the manufacture of furniture and toys.
