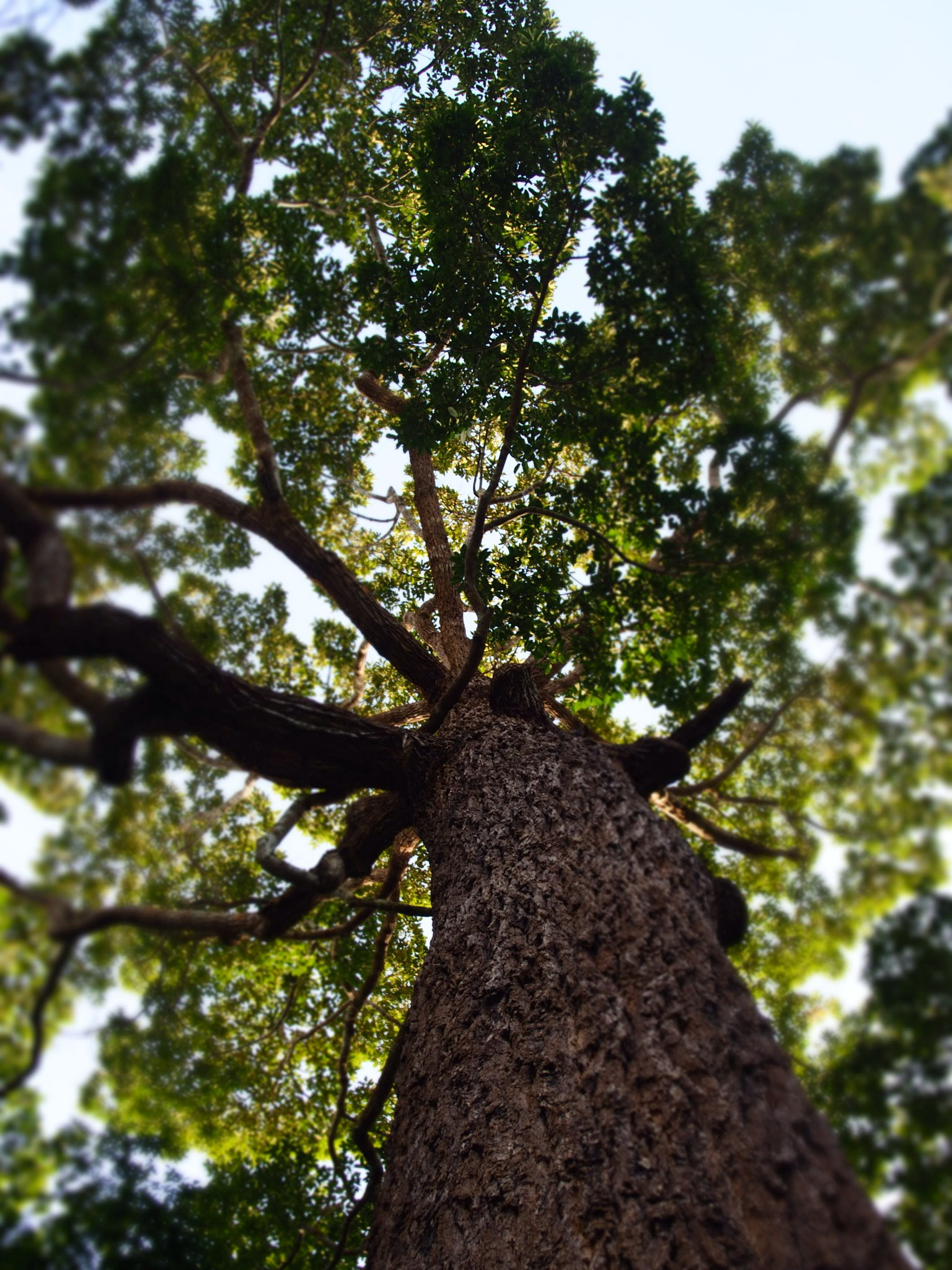

Conservation status
- Endangered (IUCN 3.1)

Scientific classification
- Kingdom: Plantae
- Clade: Tracheophytes
- Clade: Angiosperms
- Clade: Eudicots
- Clade: Rosids
- Order: Malvales
- Family: Dipterocarpaceae
- Genus: Anisoptera
- Species: A. costata

Binomial name
- Anisoptera costata Korth.

Synonyms
- Anisoptera cochinchinensis Pierre; Anisoptera marginatoides F.Heim; Anisoptera mindanensis Foxw.; Anisoptera oblonga Dyer; Anisoptera robusta Pierre; Dryobalanops hallii Korth. ex Burck; Shorea nervosa Kurz

= Anisoptera costata =

Species of tree

Anisoptera costata is an endangered species of plant in the family Dipterocarpaceae. The specific epithet costata means "ribbed", referring to the prominent venation of the leaf blade. A huge emergent tree up to 65 m high, it is found in evergreen and semi-evergreen lowland tropical seasonal forests of Indo-Burma and in mixed dipterocarp forests of Malesia.

The species was described by Pieter Willem Korthals in 1840.

== Distribution and habitat ==
Anisoptera costata is native to Bangladesh, Borneo, Sumatra, Java, Cambodia, Laos, Peninsular Malaysia, Myanmar, the Philippines, Thailand, and Vietnam. Its habitat is in forest types including dipterocarp and evergreen, to elevations of 700 m (2,300 ft). In Laos, the tree grows along rivers.

== Uses ==
Both Anisoptera costata and Dalbergia cochinchinensis are six-year-old native species for the forest plantation strategy to increase biomass, forest ecosystems, timber supply, and socio-economic. It is important to environmental, and biodiversity purpose with improving soil condition in the forest.

The characteristic of wood is rough, it hard to convert to furniture, and other tool. The colour is yellow, light brown, yellow brown, and dark brown. The wood can be used for frame structures, columns, ceilings, and floors.

== Fruits and flowers ==
Anisoptera costata fruits or nuts have the size of broadly conical longer wing is 9–12 by 1.4-1.8 cm, and shorter wing: 1.2-1.5 by 0.2-0.35 cm. It has white-yellow flowers, 6 mm in length. The flowers are food for insects and moths such as the red coffee borer (Polyphagozerra coffeae).
