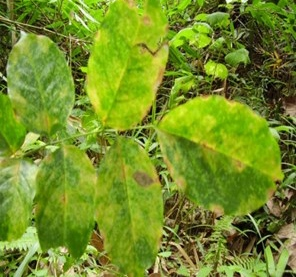
- Pentacme contorta

Scientific classification
- Kingdom: Plantae
- Clade: Tracheophytes
- Clade: Angiosperms
- Clade: Eudicots
- Clade: Rosids
- Order: Malvales
- Family: Dipterocarpaceae
- Tribe: Shoreae
- Genus: Pentacme; A.DC. (1868)

Species
- Pentacme contorta (S.Vidal) Merr. & Rolfe; Pentacme siamensis (Miq.) Kurz

= Pentacme =

Genus of flowering plants

Pentacme is a genus of trees in the family Dipterocarpaceae. It includes two species of trees native to Indochina, Peninsular Malaysia, and the Philippines.

- Pentacme contorta (S.Vidal) Merr. & Rolfe – Philippines
- Pentacme siamensis (Miq.) Kurz – Cambodia, Laos, Myanmar, Vietnam, and northwestern Peninsular Malaysia
