= Anthoshorea cordata =

Conservation status
- Endangered (IUCN 3.1)

Scientific classification
- Kingdom: Plantae
- Clade: Tracheophytes
- Clade: Angiosperms
- Clade: Eudicots
- Clade: Rosids
- Order: Malvales
- Family: Dipterocarpaceae
- Genus: Anthoshorea
- Species: A. cordata

Binomial name
- Anthoshorea cordata (P.S.Ashton) P.S.Ashton & J.Heck. (2022)

Synonyms
- Shorea cordata P.S.Ashton (1967)

Species of tree

Anthoshorea cordata is a species of plant in the family Dipterocarpaceae. The species name cordata is derived from Latin (cordatus = heart-shaped) and refers to the shape of the leaf base. It is an emergent tree, up to 50 m, found in mixed dipterocarp forest on clay-rich soils over igneous rock.

Anthoshorea cordata is endemic to western Borneo, native to Sarawak and northwestern Kalimantan. It is threatened by habitat loss.
