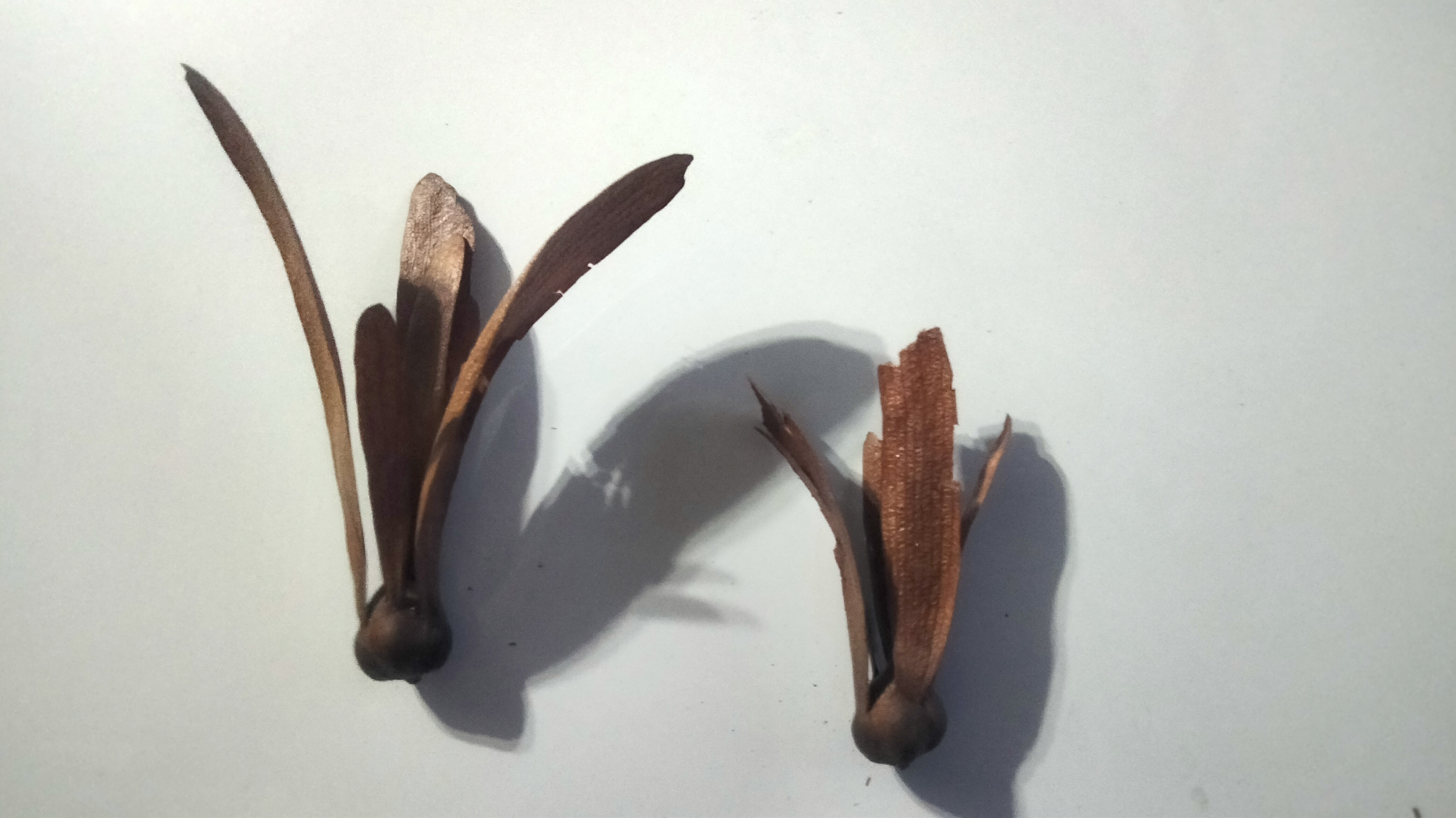
- Seeds of Anthoshorea assamica

Conservation status
- Least Concern (IUCN 3.1)

Scientific classification
- Kingdom: Plantae
- Clade: Embryophytes
- Clade: Tracheophytes
- Clade: Angiosperms
- Clade: Eudicots
- Clade: Rosids
- Order: Malvales
- Family: Dipterocarpaceae
- Genus: Anthoshorea
- Species: A. assamica

Binomial name
- Anthoshorea assamica (Dyer) P.S.Ashton & J.Heck. (2022)

Synonyms
- Aporosa minahassae Koord. (1898); Shorea assamica Dyer (1874); Shorea assamica subsp. assamica; Shorea assamica subsp. globifera (Ridl.) Symington (1938); Shorea assamica f. globifera (Ridl.) Symington (1938); Shorea assamica f. koordersii (Brandis ex Koord.) Syme (1938); Shorea assamica subsp. koordersii (Brandis ex Koord.) Y.K.Yang & J.K.Wu (2002); Shorea assamica f. philippinensis (Brandis) Syme (1938); Shorea assamica subsp. philippinensis (Brandis) Symington (1938); Shorea assamica var. philippinensis (Brandis) Y.K.Yang & J.K.Wu (2002); Shorea assamica subsp. yingjiangensis Y.K.Yang & J.K.Wu (2002); Shorea globifera Ridl. (1922); Shorea koordersii Brandis ex Koord. (1898); Shorea pallida Foxw. (1918); Shorea philippinensis Brandis (1895); Shorea sororia Slooten (1949)

= Anthoshorea assamica =

Species of flowering plant

Anthoshorea assamica is a species of tree in the family Dipterocarpaceae, It is a large tree, growing to more than 50 meters in height. It flowers from June to July and fruits in December and January. The species ranges from Arunachal Pradesh in the eastern Himalayas to Yunnan in south-central China, and southwards through Myanmar, Thailand, Peninsular Malaysia, Sumatra, Borneo, the Philippines, Sulawesi, and Maluku. It grows in valleys in lowland tropical forests up to 1000 meters elevation. Its seedlings and saplings can tolerate some shade. The tree is not fire resistant.
