= Cotylelobium melanoxylon =

Conservation status
- Least Concern (IUCN 3.1)

Scientific classification
- Kingdom: Plantae
- Clade: Tracheophytes
- Clade: Angiosperms
- Clade: Eudicots
- Clade: Rosids
- Order: Malvales
- Family: Dipterocarpaceae
- Genus: Cotylelobium
- Species: C. melanoxylon

Binomial name
- Cotylelobium melanoxylon (Hook.f.) Pierre

Synonyms
- Anisoptera melanoxylon Hook.f.; Cotylelobium beccarianum (F.Heim) F.Heim; Cotylelobium harmandii (F.Heim) F.Heim; Cotylelobium leucocarpum Slooten; Sunaptea melanoxylon (Hook.f.) Kosterm.; Vatica beccariana F.Heim; Vatica harmandii F.Heim; Vatica melanoxylon (Hook.f.) Benth. & Hook.f. ex Miq.

Species of tree

Cotylelobium melanoxylon is a tree in the family Dipterocarpaceae. The specific epithet melanoxylon means "black wood", referring to the dark colour of the tree's wood. It was first described by Joseph Dalton Hooker in 1860 as Anisoptera melanoxylon and transferred to Cotylelobium by Jean Baptiste Louis Pierre in 1889. It is the provincial tree of Surat Thani Province, Thailand.

== Description ==
Cotylelobium melanoxylon grows up to 60 metres (200 ft) tall, with a trunk diameter of up to 1.5 m (5 ft). The leathery leaves are lanceolate or ovate or oblong and measure up to 10 cm (4 in) long. The inflorescences measure up to 8 cm (3 in) long and bear cream flowers.

== Distribution and habitat ==
Cotylelobium melanoxylon is native to Thailand, Peninsular Malaysia, Sumatra and Borneo. Its habitat is in kerangas and mixed dipterocarp forests, at elevations up to 750 m (2,500 ft).
