= Anthoshorea dealbata =

Conservation status
- Vulnerable (IUCN 3.1)

Scientific classification
- Kingdom: Plantae
- Clade: Tracheophytes
- Clade: Angiosperms
- Clade: Eudicots
- Clade: Rosids
- Order: Malvales
- Family: Dipterocarpaceae
- Genus: Anthoshorea
- Species: A. dealbata

Binomial name
- Anthoshorea dealbata (Foxw.) P.S.Ashton & J.Heck. (2022)

Synonyms
- Shorea dealbata Foxw. (1932)

Species of tree

Anthshorea dealbata is a species of plant in the family Dipterocarpaceae. The species name is derived from Latin (dealbatus = whitewashed) and refers to the pale undersurface of the leaf.

== Description ==
It is a main canopy tree, up to 30 m tall, found in kerangas forests on white sand terraces and on sandstone plateau.

== Distribution ==
It is found in Sumatra, Peninsular Malaysia and Borneo where it is threatened by habitat loss. It is found within at least one protected area, Bako National Park in Borneo.

== Wood ==
The timber is sold under the trade name white meranti.
