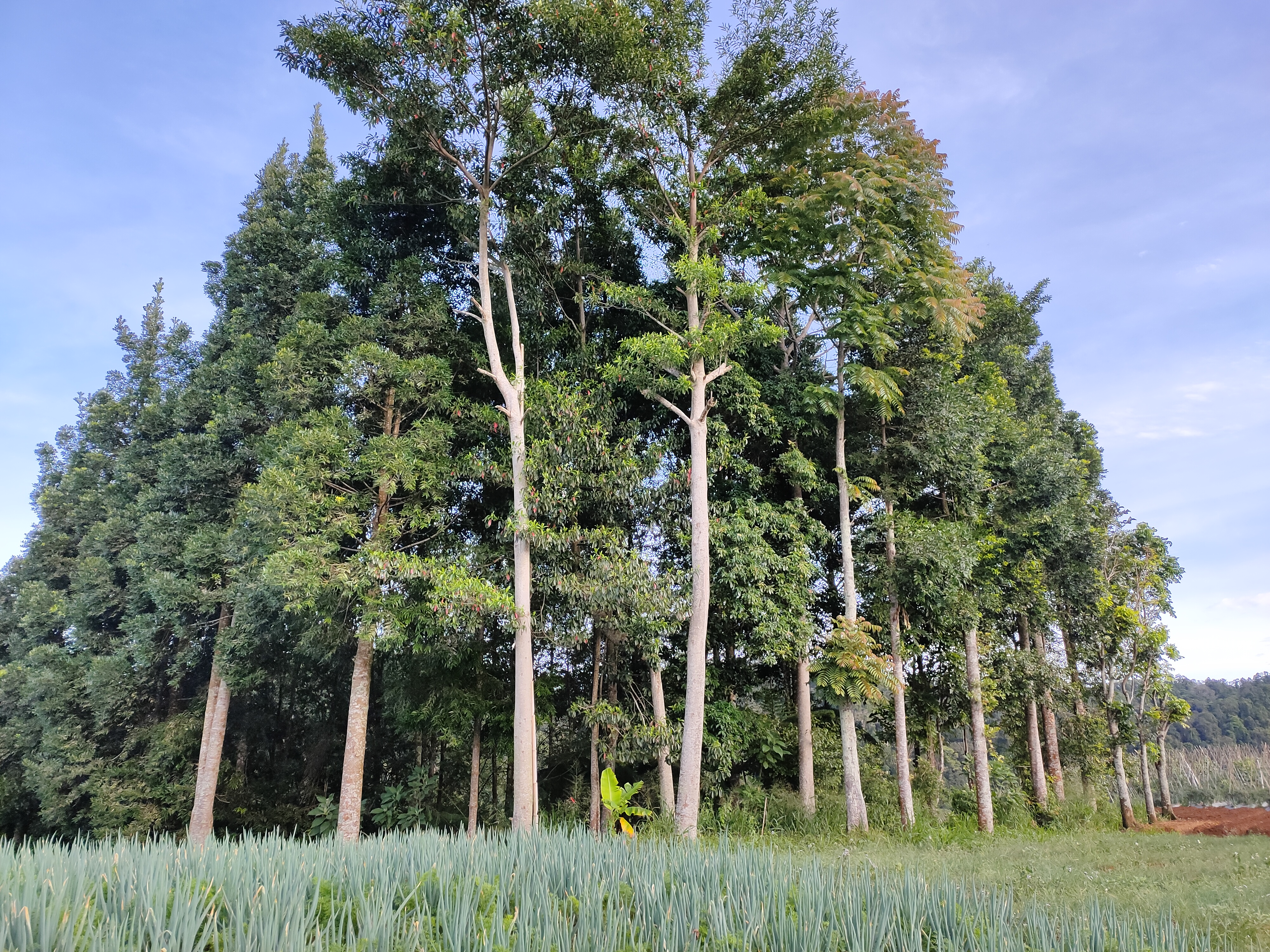
- A. javanica trees in Caringin District, West Java, Indonesia

Conservation status
- Endangered (IUCN 3.1)

Scientific classification
- Kingdom: Plantae
- Clade: Tracheophytes
- Clade: Angiosperms
- Clade: Eudicots
- Clade: Rosids
- Order: Malvales
- Family: Dipterocarpaceae
- Genus: Anthoshorea
- Species: A. javanica

Binomial name
- Anthoshorea javanica (Koord. & Valeton) P.S.Ashton & J.Heck. (2022)

Synonyms
- Shorea javanica Koord. & Valeton (1899); Shorea vandekoppeli Parijs (1933); Shorea vandekoppeli var. grandifolia Parijs (1933)

= Anthoshorea javanica =

Species of flowering plant

Anthoshorea javanica is a species of flowering plant in the family Dipterocarpaceae. It is a tree native to southern Sumatra and Java in Indonesia. It is one of several dipterocarp species commonly known as white meranti.

It is a large tree, growing up to 40 or 50 meters tall. It generally flowers in January and is pollinated by insects. Seeds are dispersed by the wind. Seedlings can tolerate shade, but the best propagation is in forest clearings.

The plant has a very restricted range, with the largest known population in Bukit Barisan Selatan National Park in southwestern Sumatra. It grows in lowland rain forest on volcanic soil, in primary and secondary forests which are periodically inundated.

The species was first described as Shorea javanica by Sijfert Hendrik Koorders and Theodoric Valeton in 1899. In 2022 it was placed in genus Anthoshorea by Peter Shaw Ashton and Jacqueline Heckenhauer.
