= Anisoptera marginata =

Conservation status
- Vulnerable (IUCN 3.1)

Scientific classification
- Kingdom: Plantae
- Clade: Embryophytes
- Clade: Tracheophytes
- Clade: Angiosperms
- Clade: Eudicots
- Clade: Rosids
- Order: Malvales
- Family: Dipterocarpaceae
- Genus: Anisoptera
- Species: A. marginata

Binomial name
- Anisoptera marginata Korth.

Synonyms
- Anisoptera grandiflora Brandis

Species of tree

Anisoptera marginata is a tree in the family Dipterocarpaceae. The specific epithet marginata means "bordered", referring to the leaf veins.

== Description ==
Anisoptera marginata grows up to 45 metres (150 ft) tall, with a trunk diameter of up to 1.5 m (5 ft). It has buttresses. The bark is fissured and flaky. The leaves are oblong to obovate and measure up to 10 cm (4 in) long. The inflorescences measure up to 14 cm (6 in) long and bear yellow flowers.

== Distribution and habitat ==
Anisoptera marginata is native to Peninsular Malaysia, Sumatra and Borneo. Its habitat is peat swamp and heath forests, to elevations of 850 m (3,000 ft).

== Conservation ==
Anisoptera marginata has been assessed as vulnerable on the IUCN Red List. It is threatened by logging for its timber and by fires. The species is found in some protected areas.
