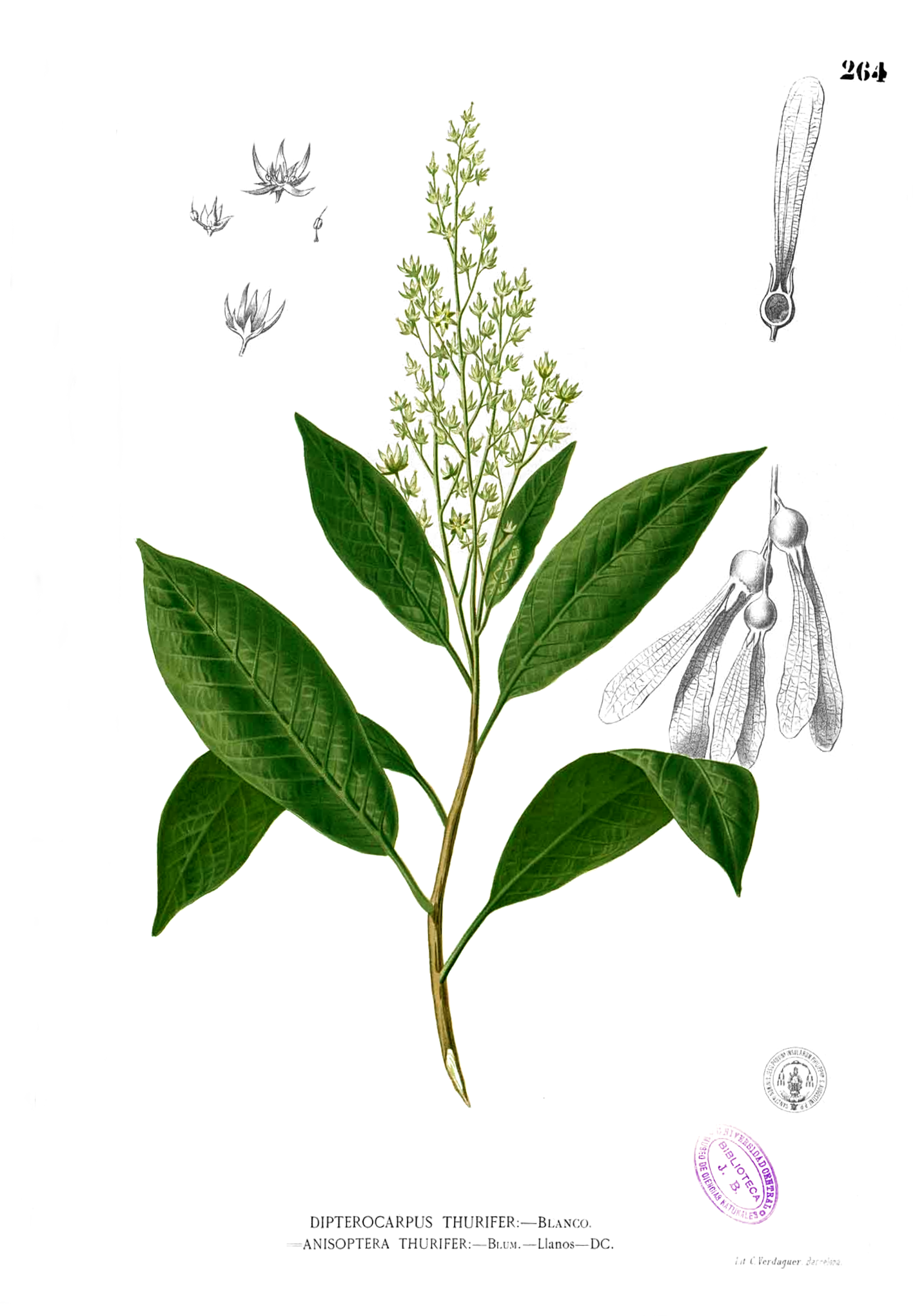
- Anisoptera thurifera

Scientific classification
- Kingdom: Plantae
- Clade: Tracheophytes
- Clade: Angiosperms
- Clade: Eudicots
- Clade: Rosids
- Order: Malvales
- Family: Dipterocarpaceae
- Subfamily: Dipterocarpoideae
- Genus: Anisoptera; Korth., 1841

Species
- See text

Synonyms
- Antherotriche Turcz.; Hopeoides Cretz.; Scaphula R.Parker

= Anisoptera (plant) =

Genus of tropical trees

Anisoptera is a genus of plants in the family Dipterocarpaceae. It contains ten species distributed from Chittagong in southeast of Bangladesh to New Guinea.

Eight out of the ten species are currently listed on the IUCN Red List. Of these, four species are listed as critically endangered and the other four as endangered. The main threat is habitat loss.

== Taxonomy ==
The name Anisoptera is derived from Greek ἄνισος ánisos “unequal” and πτερόν pterón “wing” describing the trees' unequal fruit calyx lobes.

== Characteristics ==
Its bark is flaky and has vertical cracks. Its wood is pale and yellowish, it makes light hardwood timber.

== Species ==
Ten species are accepted:

- Anisoptera aurea Foxw. – Philippines
- Anisoptera costata Korth. – Indochina, Peninsular Malaysia, Sumatra, Java, Borneo, and Philippines
- Anisoptera curtisii Dyer ex King – Myanmar, Thailand, Peninsular Malaysia, and Sumatra
- Anisoptera grossivenia Slooten – Borneo
- Anisoptera laevis Ridl. – Peninsular Thailand, Peninsular Malaysia, Sumatra, and Borneo
- Anisoptera marginata Korth. – Peninsular Malaysia, Sumatra, and Borneo
- Anisoptera megistocarpa Slooten – Peninsular Thailand, Peninsular Malaysia, and Sumatra
- Anisoptera reticulata P.S.Ashton – western and northwestern Borneo
- Anisoptera scaphula (Roxb.) Kurz – Assam, Bangladesh, Myanmar, Thailand, Peninsular Malaysia, and Vietnam
- Anisoptera thurifera (Blanco) Blume – Philippines, Sulawesi, Maluku, and New Guinea

NB: Anisoptera parvifolia Warb. is a synonym of Hopea parvifolia (Warb.) Slooten
