= List of tallest trees =

List of tallest living trees, by species

This is a list of the tallest known species of trees, as reflected by measurements of the tallest reliably-measured individual specimen. Although giant trees grow in both tropical and temperate regions, they are very restricted geographically and phylogenetically. All the known giant trees occur in mesic climates, and nearly all of them are found in three regions: western North America (from California to British Columbia), Southeast Asia (especially Borneo) and southeastern Australia (especially Tasmania).

== Tallest living individuals by species ==
The following are the tallest reliably-measured specimens from the top species. This table contains information on all species for which at least one specimen has been reliably measured at 80 meters (260 feet) or taller.

List of tallest trees by species
Species	Height		Tree name	Class	Location	Continent	References
Species	Metres	Feet	Tree name	Class	Location	Continent	References
Coast redwood (Sequoia sempervirens)	116.22	381.3	Hyperion	Conifer	Redwood National Park, California, United States	Western North America	It reached 116.07 metres (380.8 ft) in 2019. The second and sixth tallest trees, both redwoods, were also found at Redwood National Park in 2006 when Hyperion was found, and were named Helios 114.8 metres (377 ft), and Icarus 113.1 metres (371 ft) tall. The coast redwoods Nugget at 113.8 metres (373 ft), Stratosphere Giant at 113.5 metres (372 ft), and Paradox at 113.3 metres (372 ft) are the third, fourth, and fifth tallest trees.
South Tibetan cypress (Cupressus austrotibetica)	102.3	336	South Tibetan Cypress No. I	Conifer	Yarlung Zangbo Grand Canyon, Tibet Autonomous Region, China	East Asia	
Sitka spruce (Picea sitchensis)	100.2	329		Conifer	Redwood National Park, California, United States	Western North America	
Coast Douglas-fir (Pseudotsuga menziesii var. menziesii)	99.5	326		Conifer	Siuslaw National Forest, Oregon, United States	Western North America	
Yellow meranti (Richetia faguetiana) (Note: The tree is on a slope, and the reported 97.58 metres (320.1 ft) height is the average measurement between the distance to the lowest part of bole and the distance to the highest part of bole)	97.58	320.1	Menara	Flowering plant	Danum Valley Conservation Area, Sabah, Malaysia on Borneo island	Southeast Asia	Believed to be tallest tree in Asia until 2023 discovery of 102.3 metres (336 ft) cypress in Tibet.
Giant sequoia (Sequoiadendron giganteum)	96.37	316.2		Conifer	Sequoia National Park, California, United States	Western North America	
Mountain ash (Eucalyptus regnans)	96	315.0	Centurion	Flowering plant	Arve Valley, Tasmania	Southeastern Australia	Reached 100.5 m (329.7 ft) in 2018, but lost 4 metres of height due to a fire in 2019, and now ranks 7th as tallest living tree.
Southern blue gum (Eucalyptus globulus)	92.0	301.8	Neeminah Loggerale Meena, or Mother and Daughter.	Flowering plant	Tasmania	Southeastern Australia	
Manna gum (Eucalyptus viminalis)	91.3	300	White Knight	Flowering plant	Evercreech Forest Reserve, Tasmania	Southeastern Australia	
Noble fir (Abies procera)	89.9	295	Goat Marsh Giant	Conifer	Goat Marsh Research Natural Area, Washington, United States	Western North America	
Dinizia excelsa	88.5	290		Flowering plant	Near the boundary of Amapá and Pará states, Brazil.	Central-northeastern South America	
Brown top stringbark (Eucalyptus obliqua)	88.5	290	Princess Picabella	Flowering plant	Tasmania	Southeastern Australia	
Alpine ash (Eucalyptus delegatensis)	87.9	288		Flowering plant	Tasmania	Southeastern Australia	
Mengaris (Koompassia excelsa)	85.76	281.4	Pontiankak Putih Cantik	Flowering plant	Tawau Hills National Park, in Sabah on Borneo	Southeast Asia	
Mountain grey gum (Eucalyptus cypellocarpa)	85.0	278.9		Flowering plant	Victoria	Southeastern Australia	
Karri (Eucalyptus diversicolor)	85.00	278.9	Stewart Karri	Flowering Plant	Western Australia	Southwestern Australia	(24)
Shorea argentifolia	84.85	278.4		Flowering plant	Gaharu ridge of Tawau Hills National Park, Sabah on Borneo	Southeast Asia	
Shorea superba	84.41	276.9		Flowering plant	Gergassi Ridge of Tawau Hills National Park, Sabah on Borneo	Southeast Asia	
Shining gum (Eucalyptus nitens)	84.3	277		Flowering plant	O'Shannassy Catchment, Victoria	Southeastern Australia	
Taiwania (Taiwania cryptomerioides)	84.1	276	大安溪倚天劍 (Heaven Sword)	Conifer	North-central Taiwan	East Asia	
Sugar pine (Pinus lambertiana)	83.45	273.8		Conifer	near Yosemite National Park, California, United States.	Western North America	
Abies chensiensis var. salouenensis	83.4	274		Conifer	Zayü County, Tibet Autonomous Region, China	East Asia	
Western hemlock (Tsuga heterophylla)	83.34	273.4		Conifer	Prairie Creek Redwoods State Park, California, United States.	Western North America	
Hopea nutans	82.82	271.7		Flowering plant	Gaharu ridge of Tawau Hills National Park, Sabah on Borneo	Southeast Asia	
Shorea johorensis	82.39	270.3		Flowering plant	Coco-Park boundary of Tawau Hills National Park, Sabah on Borneo	Southeast Asia	
Shorea smithiana	82.27	269.9		Flowering plant	Coco-Park boundary of Tawau Hills National Park, Sabah on Borneo	Southeast Asia	
Ponderosa pine (Pinus ponderosa)	81.77	268.3	Phalanx	Conifer	in Myers Creek drainage of Rogue River – Siskiyou National Forest, Oregon, United States	Western North America	
Entandrophragma excelsum	81.5	267		Flowering plant	at Kilimanjaro, Tanzania	Eastern Africa	
Sydney blue gum (Eucalyptus saligna)	81.5	267		Flowering plant	Woodbush State Forest, Limpopo, South Africa. The world's tallest planted tree.	Southern Africa (non native), but endemic to eastern Australia)	
Grand fir (Abies grandis)	81.4	267		Conifer	Glacier Peak Wilderness, Washington, United States.	Western North America	
Shorea gibbosa	81.11	266.1		Flowering plant	River Flats of Tawau Hills National Park, Sabah on Borneo	Southeast Asia	
Lawson's cypress (Chamaecyparis lawsoniana)	81.08	266.0		Conifer	In Jedediah Smith Redwoods State Park, California, United States	Western North America	

== Maximum limits of tree height ==
Two main opposing forces affect a tree's height; one pushes it upward while the other holds it down. By analyzing the interplay between these forces in coast redwoods (Sequoia sempervirens), a team of biologists led by George Koch of Northern Arizona University calculated the theoretical maximum tree height or the point at which opposing forces balance out and a tree stops growing. This point lies somewhere between 122 and 130 m (400 and 427 ft). On the one hand, the researchers found, trees in forests "desire" to grow as tall as possible to overtake neighboring trees and reach stronger sunlight. On the other hand, gravity makes it more and more difficult to haul water upwards from the roots to the canopy as the tree grows, and leaves thus become smaller near the top. They discovered that despite the moistness of the ground far below, the leaves at the treetops struggle to get enough water, so they are effectively living in a constant drought. The difficulty of getting water so far up into the sky is what ultimately constrains growth. Other researchers have developed models of maximum height for Coast Douglas-fir (Pseudotsuga menziesii var. menziesii) trees that yield similar estimates of 109 to 138 meters (358 to 453 ft), a range that includes the height of the tallest reliably-measured historical (dead) specimen, a 126-metre (413 ft) tree.

== Other claims of superlative height ==
There are many historical and contemporary claims of superlative height for species beyond those listed in the table above. For example, several articles published in 1878 describe an Eucalyptus amygdalina exceeding 380 feet (120 m) and others nearing 420 feet (130 m) up to 500 feet (150 m), including the Nooksack Giant which was measured using a tape at 465 feet (142 m) after being cut down.

The heights of the tallest trees in the world have been the subject of considerable dispute and much exaggeration. Modern verified measurements with laser rangefinders or with tape drop measurements made by tree climbers (such as those carried out by canopy researchers), have shown that some older tree height measurement methods are often unreliable, sometimes producing exaggerations of 5% to 15% or more above the real height.

== See also ==
- List of individual trees
- List of oldest trees
- List of superlative trees
- List of tallest buildings and structures
