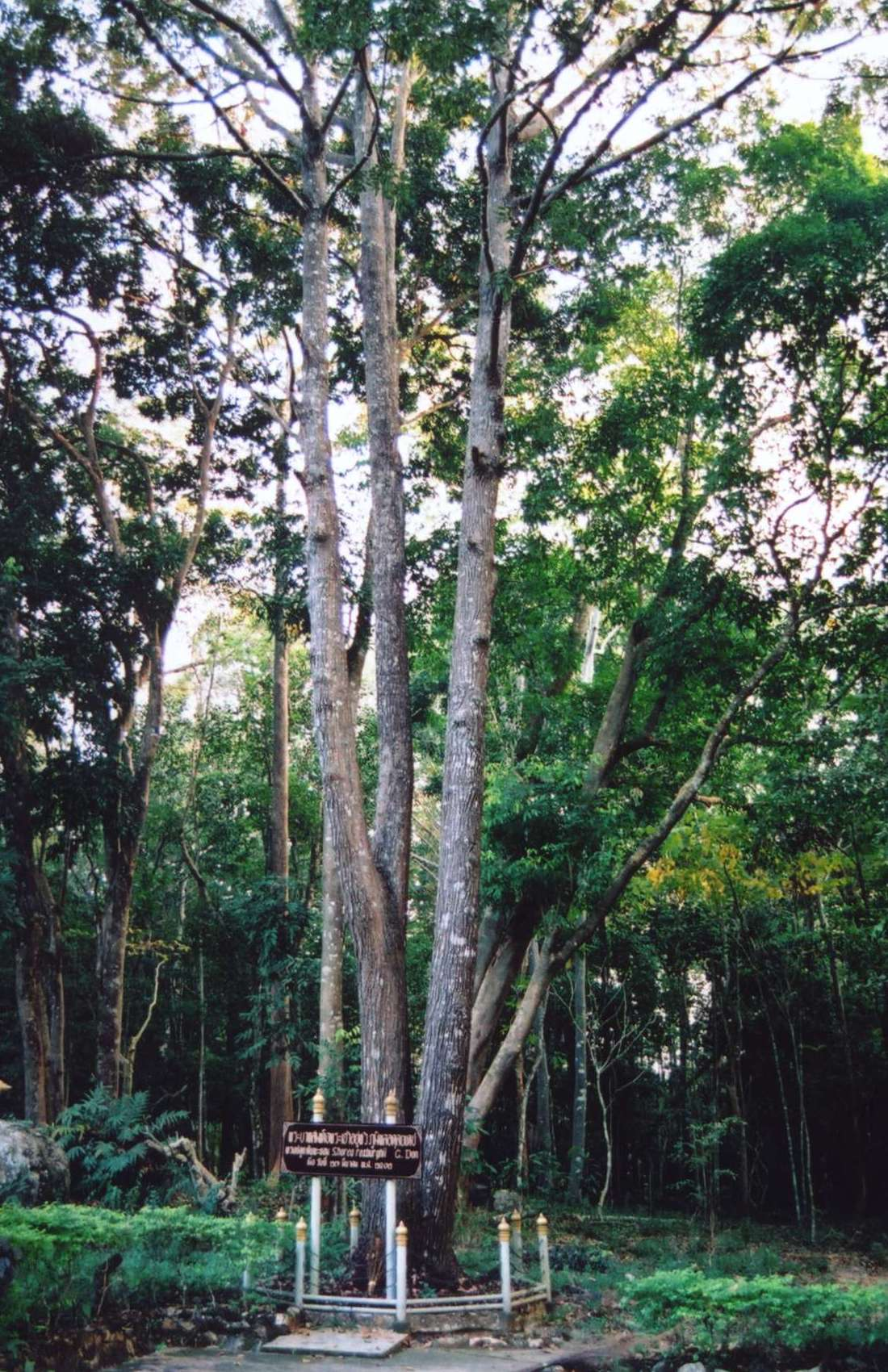
- Shorea roxburghii

Scientific classification
- Kingdom: Plantae
- Clade: Tracheophytes
- Clade: Angiosperms
- Clade: Eudicots
- Clade: Rosids
- Order: Malvales
- Family: Dipterocarpaceae
- Tribe: Shoreae
- Genus: Shorea; Roxb. ex C.F.Gaertn. (1805)

Synonyms
- Caryolobis Gaertn. (1788); Isoptera Scheff. ex Burck (1887); Pachychlamys Dyer ex Ridley (1922); Parahopea F.Heim (1892)

= Shorea =

Shorea Temporal range: Early Eocene – present

Genus of tropical trees

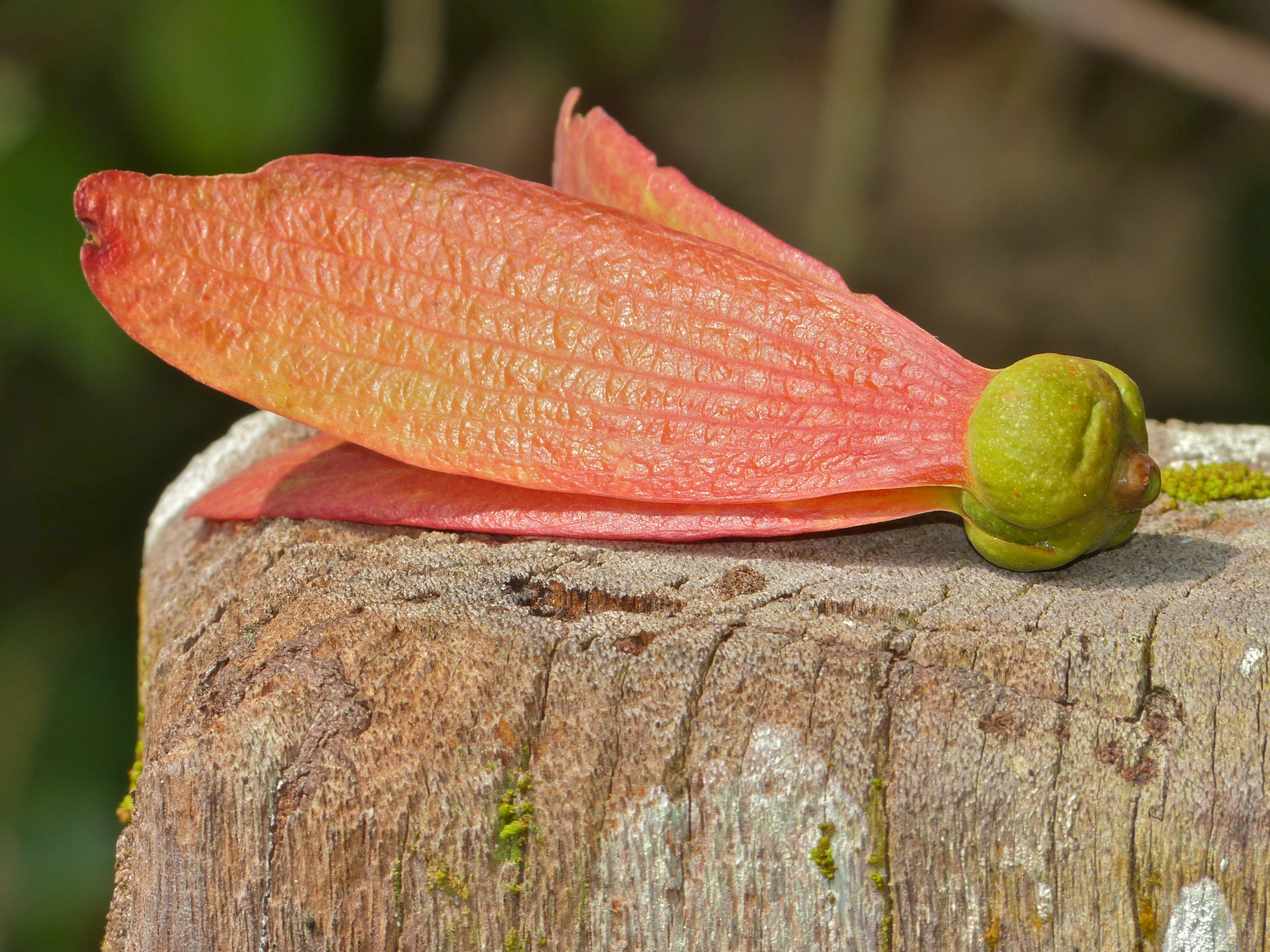
Fruit of a Shorea species

Shorea is a genus of about 47 species of mainly rainforest trees in the family Dipterocarpaceae. The timber of trees of the genus is sold under the common names lauan, luan, lawaan, meranti, seraya, balau, bangkirai, and Philippine mahogany.

== Description ==
The tallest documented tropical angiosperm is a 100.8 m (331 ft) Shorea faguetiana found in the Danum Valley Conservation Area, in Sabah, Malaysia (Borneo). In Sabah's Tawau Hills National Park, at least five other species of the genus have been measured to be over 80 m (260 ft) tall: S. argentifolia, S. gibbosa, S. johorensis, S. smithiana, and S. superba. Borneo is also the hotspot of Shorea diversity with 138 species, of which 91 are endemic to the island.

=== Reproduction ===
The majority of Shorea spp. are general flowering species, which is an event occurring at irregular intervals of 3–10 years, in which nearly all dipterocarp species together with species of other families bloom heavily. General flowering is thought to have evolved to satiate seed predators and/or to facilitate pollination. Both explanations apparently hold merit. Flowering is thought to be triggered by droughts that occur during transition periods from La Niña to El Niño. The magnitude of a flowering event is suggested to be dependent on the timing of the droughts associated with the El Niño southern oscillation cycle, with the largest events occurring after an interval of several years with no flowering.

Shorea spp. are insect pollinated. A variety of insects have been identified as pollinators, with species within the sections of Shorea sharing the same insect pollinators. Flowering within a section is sequential within one habitat and species association to prevent competition for pollinators.

Seed predation and mortality have an impact on the reproduction process of dipterocarps such as Shorea. In Singapore, crab-eating macaque and moth larvae are known seed predators.

== Taxonomy ==
Shorea fossils (linked with the modern sal, S. robusta, which is still a dominant tree species in Indian forests) are known from as early as the Eocene of Gujarat, India. They are identifiable by the amber fossils formed by their dammar resin. Other fossils include a Miocene-aged fossilized fruit from the same region; this fruit most closely resembles the extant S. macroptera of the Malay Peninsula.

=== Sections and selected species ===
Anthoshorea

- Shorea agamii P.S.Ashton

Brachypterae

- Shorea smithiana Symington

Doona

- Shorea zeylanica (Thwaites) P.S.Ashton

Mutica

- Shorea argentifolia Symington
- Shorea parvifolia Dyer

Neohopea

- Shorea isoptera P.S.Ashton

Ovalis

- Shorea ovalis (Korth.) Blume

Pachycarpae

- Shorea macrophylla (de Vriese) P.S.Ashton

Pentacme

- Shorea siamensis Miq.

Richetioides

- Shorea richetia Symington

Rubella

- Shorea albida Symington

Shorea

- Shorea guiso (Blanco) Blume

Not placed

- Shorea robusta C.F.Gaertn. (sal tree)
- Shorea thorelii Pierre ex Laness.

=== Etymology ===
The genus is named after Sir John Shore, the governor-general of the British East India Company, 1793–1798.

== Distribution and habitat ==
Shorea spp. are native to Southeast Asia, from northern India to Malaysia, Indonesia, and the Philippines. In west Malesia and the Philippines, this genus dominates the skyline of the tropical forests.

== Conservation ==
Of the 148 species of Shorea currently listed on the IUCN Redlist, most are listed as being critically endangered. Some concerns exist regarding the IUCN's listing of dipterocarps, as the criteria used to assess the level of threat are based mainly on animal population characteristics. This is thought to overstate the threat assessment, when applied to long-lived, habitat-specific organisms such as trees.

Conservation status of Shorea spp.
IUCN red list category	Number of species
Extinct	1
Critically endangered	102
Endangered	34
Vulnerable	3
Least concern	6
Data deficient	2
Not evaluated	~48

== Uses ==
Many economically important timber trees belong to Shorea. They are sold under various trade names including lauan, lawaan, meranti, seraya, balau, bangkirai, and Philippine mahogany. The Philippine mahogany sold in North America is not a true mahogany at all, but a mixture of woods from the genus Shorea.

Lauan is commonly used as paneling in recreational vehicles; the RV industry is the largest consumer of tropical plywood in the U.S. Its use contributes to deforestation in Indonesia, threatening endangered species and releasing carbon stored in forests.

Other products from Shorea spp. include dammar and illipe. Dammar is a resin collected from a variety of species. It varies in colour among the different taxonomic groups. Shorea wiesneri is listed in many websites as an important source of dammar; however, this appears to be either a trade name or a synonym.

Borneo tallow nut oil is extracted from the egg-shaped, winged fruit of Shorea species.
