= Chrysocercops malayana =

Scientific classification
- Kingdom: Animalia
- Phylum: Arthropoda
- Class: Insecta
- Order: Lepidoptera
- Family: Gracillariidae
- Genus: Chrysocercops
- Species: C. malayana

Binomial name
- Chrysocercops malayana Kumata, 1992

Species of moth

Chrysocercops malayana is a moth of the family Gracillariidae. It is known from Malaysia (Negeri Sembilan, Pahang and Selangor).

The wingspan is 5–7 mm.

The larvae feed on Shorea species, including Shorea acuminata, Shorea bracteolata and Shorea leprosula.
