= Chrysocercops hopeella =

Scientific classification
- Kingdom: Animalia
- Phylum: Arthropoda
- Class: Insecta
- Order: Lepidoptera
- Family: Gracillariidae
- Genus: Chrysocercops
- Species: C. hopeella

Binomial name
- Chrysocercops hopeella Kumata, 1992

Species of moth

Chrysocercops hopeella is a moth of the family Gracillariidae. It is known from Malaysia (Pahang and Selangor).

The wingspan is 4.5–5.1 mm.

The larvae feed on Hopea nutans and Hopea odorata. They mine the leaves of their host plant. The mine is identical to that of Chrysocercops melastigmata.
