= Chrysocercops azmii =

Scientific classification
- Kingdom: Animalia
- Phylum: Arthropoda
- Clade: Pancrustacea
- Class: Insecta
- Order: Lepidoptera
- Family: Gracillariidae
- Genus: Chrysocercops
- Species: C. azmii

Binomial name
- Chrysocercops azmii Kumata, 1992

Species of moth

Chrysocercops azmii is a moth of the family Gracillariidae. It is known from Selangor, Malaysia.

The wingspan is 5.9–7.6 mm.

The larvae feed on Shorea maxima. They mine the leaves of their host plant.
