= Chrysocercops argentata =

Scientific classification
- Kingdom: Animalia
- Phylum: Arthropoda
- Class: Insecta
- Order: Lepidoptera
- Family: Gracillariidae
- Genus: Chrysocercops
- Species: C. argentata

Binomial name
- Chrysocercops argentata Kumata, 1992

Species of moth

Chrysocercops argentata is a moth of the family Gracillariidae. It is known from Pahang, Malaysia and from Nepal.

The wingspan is 6.1–6.8 mm.

The larvae feed on Hopea nutans and Shorea robusta. They mine the leaves of their host plant.
