= Chrysocercops castanopsidis =

Scientific classification
- Kingdom: Animalia
- Phylum: Arthropoda
- Class: Insecta
- Order: Lepidoptera
- Family: Gracillariidae
- Genus: Chrysocercops
- Species: C. castanopsidis

Binomial name
- Chrysocercops castanopsidis Kumata & Kuroko, 1988

Species of moth

Chrysocercops castanopsidis is a moth of the family Gracillariidae. It is known from Japan (Honshū, Iriomote, Isigaki, Okinawa and Shikoku).

The wingspan is about 6.2–8 mm.

The larvae feed on Castanopsis cuspidata, Castanopsis sieboldii, Lithocarpus glaber and Pasania glabra. They probably mine the leaves of their host plant.
