= Shorea thorelii =

Conservation status
- Vulnerable (IUCN 3.1)

Scientific classification
- Kingdom: Plantae
- Clade: Tracheophytes
- Clade: Angiosperms
- Clade: Eudicots
- Clade: Rosids
- Order: Malvales
- Family: Dipterocarpaceae
- Genus: Shorea
- Species: S. thorelii

Binomial name
- Shorea thorelii Pierre

Synonyms
- Parashorea laotica Tardieu; Shorea argentea C.E.C.Fisch.

Species of tree native to Indochina

Shorea thorelii is a highly vulnerable species of Asian trees, described by Pierre and Lanessan, which is included in the genus Shorea and family Dipterocarpaceae; the species is named after the French botanist Clovis Thorel. No subspecies are listed in the Catalogue of Life.

Native to mainland Indochina and Bangladesh, its name in Vietnam is chai or chai Thorel: and labelled specimens can be found in the ForestFloorLodge area of Cat Tien National Park.
