= Chrysocercops pectinata =

Scientific classification
- Kingdom: Animalia
- Phylum: Arthropoda
- Class: Insecta
- Order: Lepidoptera
- Family: Gracillariidae
- Genus: Chrysocercops
- Species: C. pectinata

Binomial name
- Chrysocercops pectinata Kumata, 1992

Species of moth

Chrysocercops pectinata is a moth of the family Gracillariidae. It is known from Kelantan and Pahang, Malaysia.

The wingspan is about 4.9 mm.

The larvae feed on Dipterocarpus grandifolius and Dipterocarpus tuberculatus. They mine the leaves of their host plant.
