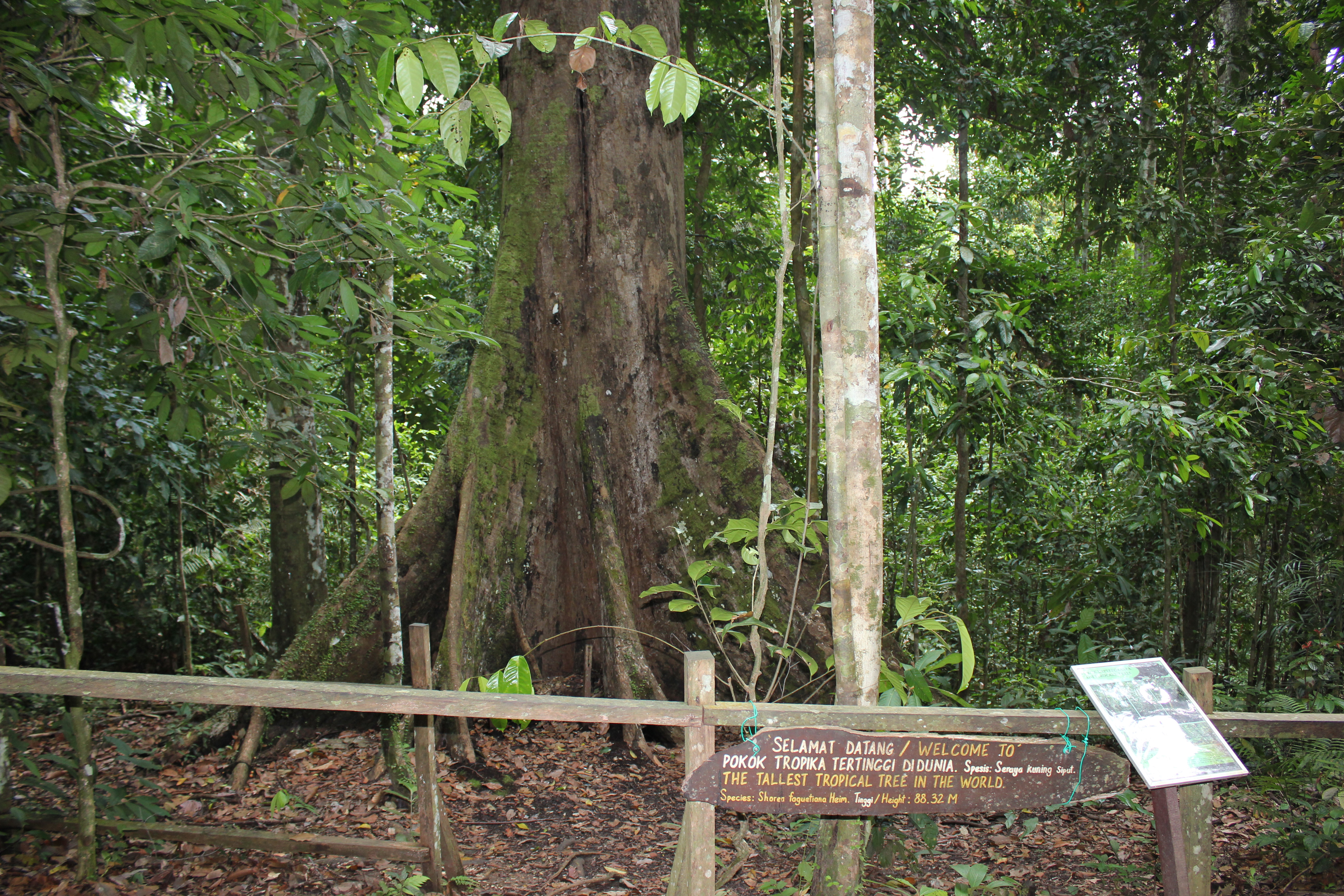
- A Richetia faguetiana specimen photographed in Tawau, Sabah, 2013. At 88.32 m, it was billed as the tallest tropical tree in the world, until the discovery of an even taller R. faguetiana, dubbed Menara, in August 2018.

Conservation status
- Endangered (IUCN 3.1)

Scientific classification
- Kingdom: Plantae
- Clade: Tracheophytes
- Clade: Angiosperms
- Clade: Eudicots
- Clade: Rosids
- Order: Malvales
- Family: Dipterocarpaceae
- Genus: Richetia
- Species: R. faguetiana

Binomial name
- Richetia faguetiana (F.Heim.) P.S.Ashton & J.Heck. (2022)

Synonyms
- Shorea dryobalanoides Dyer (1893); Shorea faguetiana F.Heim (1891); Shorea ridleyana King (1893)

= Richetia faguetiana =

Species of tree

Richetia faguetiana is a species of plant in the family Dipterocarpaceae. Along with other species in the genus Richetia, it is also known as the yellow meranti. It is native to Borneo, the Malay Peninsula, and Thailand. It is the second tallest flowering plant, and fifth tallest living tree; the tallest living specimen, Menara was measured to be 97.58 m (320.1 ft) height in 2019.

== Height ==
The tallest specimen, named "Menara", was measured in 2019. The tree's height was measured from the top of the crown to the lowest part of the buttress, giving an averaged measurement of 97.58 m.

An almost equally tall R. faguetiana, 96.9 m (318 ft), was found in 2018 in the Tawau Hills National Park, Sabah, some 24 km (15 mi) from Tawau and about 9.5 km (5.9 mi) from the park's main station.

In 2016, the then tallest tropical tree, known as "Lahad Datu", was found at the Danum Valley Conservation Area. It was measured as an average of tape drops to be 93.0 m (305.1 ft) tall and its canopy was 40.3 m (132 ft) in diameter.

Also in 2016, a Richetia faguetiana tree 89.5 m (294 ft) tall was found in the Maliau Basin Conservation Area in Sabah.

== See also ==
- The world's tallest tree species
