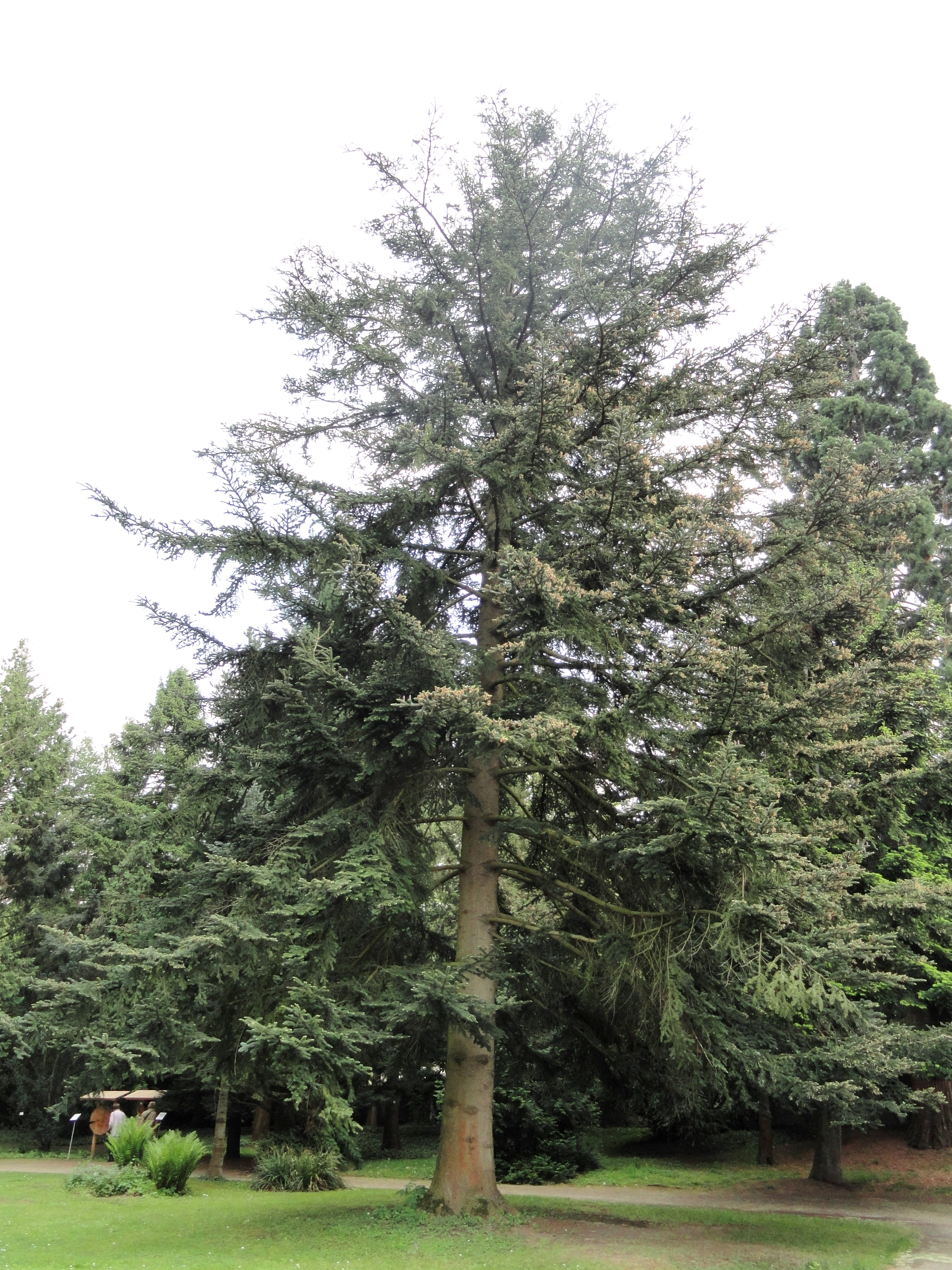

Conservation status
- Least Concern (IUCN 3.1)

Scientific classification
- Kingdom: Plantae
- Clade: Tracheophytes
- Clade: Gymnospermae
- Division: Pinophyta
- Class: Pinopsida
- Order: Pinales
- Family: Pinaceae
- Genus: Abies
- Species: A. chensiensis

Binomial name
- Abies chensiensis Tiegh.

= Abies chensiensis =

Species of conifer

Abies chensiensis, the Shensi fir, is a fir native to Gansu, Hubei, Sichuan, Tibet, Yunnan in China, and Arunachal Pradesh in India. It was first described by Philippe Édouard Léon Van Tieghem in 1892.

== Description ==
The Shensi fir is a straight-stemmed, evergreen tree, which can reach heights of up to 50 m (160 ft) and can have a diameter at breast height of up to 250 cm (98 in). Young trees' bark is smooth and light gray, developing longitudinal fissures as the tree ages.

The twigs are yellow-gray to yellow-brown and shining. Vegetative buds are ovoid to conic, 10 x 6 mm or more on some primary branches. The leaves are two-ranked, dark green, and 15-48 x 2.5-3 mm. They are linear and flattened, twisted at the base and grooved above. Leaf stomata ore located in two wide bands on either side of the midvein.

Pollen is produced in lateral male cones up to 10 mm long. Female (seed) cones are green, maturing to brown, cylindric to cylindric-ovate, 7-10 x 3-4 cm long, and borne on a short peduncle.

=== Tallest tree ===
The tallest measured specimen is 83.4 m (274 ft), with a circumference of 2.07 m (6 ft 9 in) and belongs to the variety A. chensiensis var. salouenensis. It was discovered in 2022 in a large primeval forest at about 2,300 m (7,500 ft) altitude. It is located in Zayü County, Nyingchi Prefecture, Tibet Autonomous Region, China.

== Varieties and synonyms ==
The species was described by Philippe Édouard Léon Van Tieghem in 1891.

Abies chensiensis varieties and its synonyms:

- Abies chensiensis var. chensiensis
- Abies chensiensis var. ernestii (Rehder) Tang S.Liu
  - Abies beissneriana Rehder & E.H.Wilson
  - Abies ernestii Rehder
  - Abies recurvata subsp. ernestii (Rehder) Silba
  - Abies recurvata var. ernestii (Rehder) Rushforth
- Abies chensiensis var. salouenensis (Bordères & Gaussen) Silba
  - Abies chensiensis subsp. salouenensis (Bordères & Gaussen) Rushforth
  - Abies ernestii var. salouenensis (Bordères & Gaussen) W.C.Cheng & L.K.Fu
  - Abies recurvata var. salouenensis (Bordères & Gaussen) C.T.Kuan
  - Abies salouenensis Bordères & Gaussen
- Abies chensiensis var. yulongxueshanensis (Rushforth) Silba
  - Abies chensiensis subsp. yulongxueshanensis Rushforth

== Distribution and habitat ==
The natural distribution of the Shensi fir is roughly bounded to the north by the Chinese provinces of Shaanxi and Gansu, and to the south by the Yunnan province. It most commonly grows in heights of 2,300–3,000 metres (7,500–9,800 ft) elevation, occasionally as low as 2,100 metres (6,900 ft) or as high as 3,500 metres (11,500 ft), in regions with an annual precipitation between 1000 and 2000 mm. It is usually associated with Picea spp., Abies fargesii var. sutchuenensis, Tsuga chinensis, and Larix potaninii at high altitudes, and at lower altitudes it associates with Betula spp. There is also at least one pure forest of Abies chensiensis in Tsin-ling Shan.

== Uses ==
The soft, light timber of the Shensi fir is finely grained, and is predominantly used as a construction material.

== See also ==
- List of tallest trees
