= Richetia kudatensis =

Conservation status
- Near Threatened (IUCN 3.1)

Scientific classification
- Kingdom: Plantae
- Clade: Tracheophytes
- Clade: Angiosperms
- Clade: Eudicots
- Clade: Rosids
- Order: Malvales
- Family: Dipterocarpaceae
- Genus: Richetia
- Species: R. kudatensis

Binomial name
- Richetia kudatensis (G.H.S.Wood ex Meijer) P.S.Ashton & J.Heck.

Synonyms
- Shorea kudatensis G.H.S.Wood ex Meijer

Species of tree

Richetia kudatensis (also called seraya kuning kudat) is a species of tree in the family Dipterocarpaceae. It is endemic to Borneo, in low coastal hills of the north and west of Malaysian Sabah.

Richetia kudatensis is a low emergent tree, growing up to 45 metres tall with a trunk diameter of up to 1.9 metres.

Richetia kudatensis' extent of occurrence (EOO) is over 19,000 km^{2}, and includes to Kota Kinabalu, Kuala Penyu, Kudat, Labuan, Papar, and Pitas districts. It has an estimated area of occupancy (AOO) of 92 km^{2}. It was formerly recorded in northeastern Sabah, but has likely been extirpated from there.

It is locally common in mixed dipterocarp forest on dry hills near the seacoast.

The species has lost approximately 90% of its natural habitat and is listed as Near Threatened on the IUCN Red List.
