= Richetia conica =

Conservation status
- Endangered (IUCN 3.1)

Scientific classification
- Kingdom: Plantae
- Clade: Tracheophytes
- Clade: Angiosperms
- Clade: Eudicots
- Clade: Rosids
- Order: Malvales
- Family: Dipterocarpaceae
- Genus: Richetia
- Species: R. conica

Binomial name
- Richetia conica (Slooten) P.S.Ashton & J.Heck.

Synonyms
- Shorea conica Slooten

Species of tree

Richetia conica is a species of flowering plant in the family Dipterocarpaceae. It is a small to medium-sized tree endemic to eastern Sumatra. It grows in the lowland rain forest and periodic swamp forest of Riau Province, below 500 meters elevation. It has been subject to habitat loss from conversion of its native forests to pulpwood and oil palm plantations, and now mostly survives in small protected areas. It is assessed as endangered by the IUCN.
