= Chrysocercops vaticae =

Scientific classification
- Kingdom: Animalia
- Phylum: Arthropoda
- Class: Insecta
- Order: Lepidoptera
- Family: Gracillariidae
- Genus: Chrysocercops
- Species: C. vaticae

Binomial name
- Chrysocercops vaticae Kumata, 1992

Species of moth

Chrysocercops vaticae is a moth of the family Gracillariidae. It is known from Negeri Sembilan, Malaysia.

The wingspan is 5.7–6.5 mm.

The larvae feed on Vatica bella. They mine the leaves of their host plant.
