= Goat Marsh Research Natural Area =

Wetlands and forest in Washington state, USA

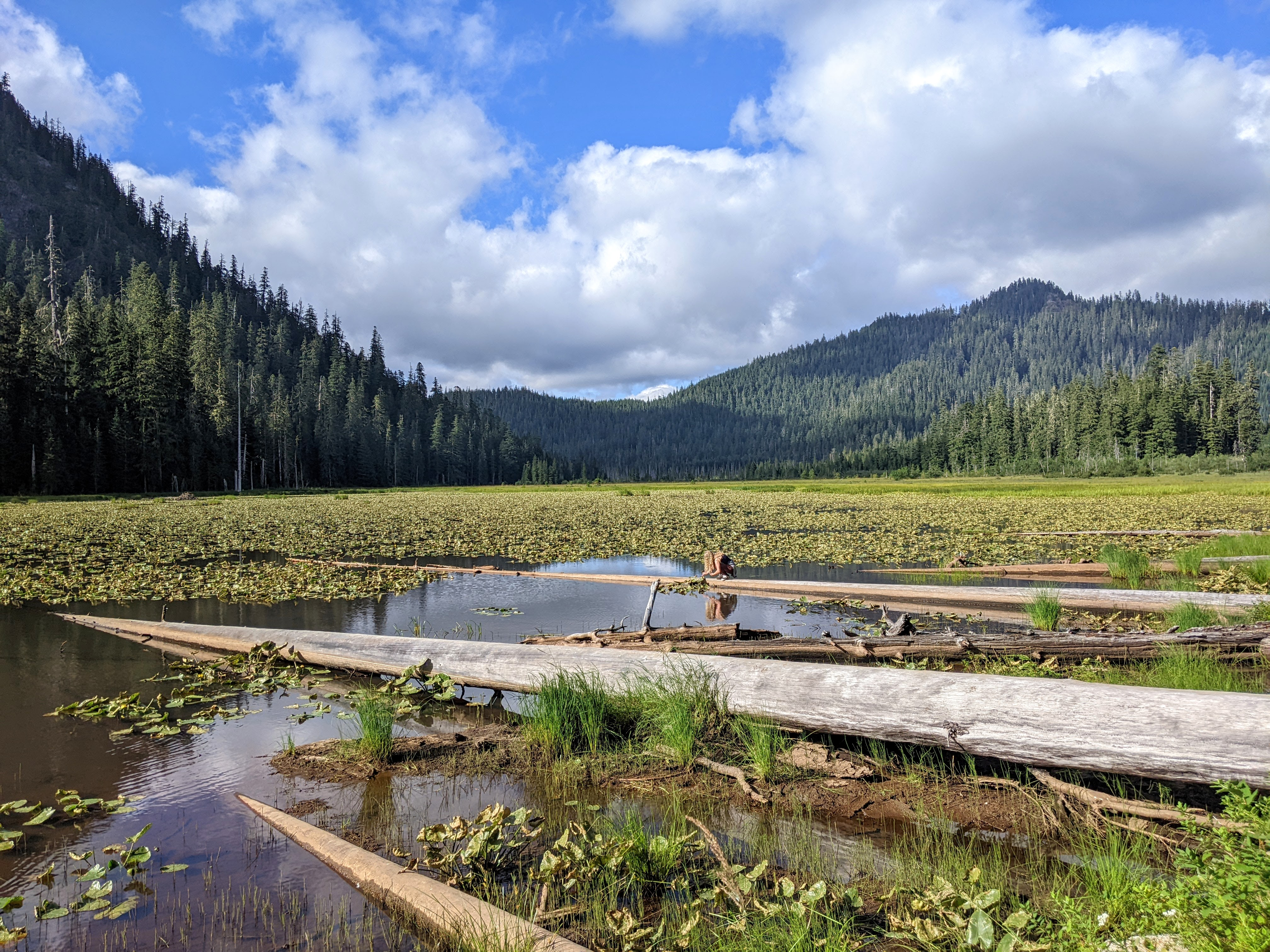
- Goat Marsh Lake, 2022

- Location within Washington (state) Location within the United States
- Coordinates: 46°09′57.45″N 122°17′25.87″W
- Area: 1,195 acres (4.84 km^{2})
- Established: 1974
- Owner: United States Forest Service

Goat Marsh Research Natural Area is a 1,195 acres (484 hectares) research natural area located southwest of Mount St. Helens and within Mount St. Helens National Volcanic Monument. The area has been identified as a region of scientific importance and preserved for ecological research due to its recent volcanic history as well as for its large tracts of mature and undisturbed noble fir forest.

The natural area is composed of wetlands, young conifer forests growing in volcanic soils, and old-growth stands of superlative noble fir and Douglas fir.

== History ==
The wetland and lodgepole pine forest ecosystems of Goat Marsh RNA were established between approximately 1550 and 1700 C.E. when pyroclastic flows triggered by the eruption of Mount St. Helens disrupted the hydrology of Cold Springs Creek. These ecosystems comprise the majority of the natural area, about 780 acres (320 hectares).

The RNA was established in 1974. The protected area represents "a mosaic of mountain marshlands, swamps, and ponds and a xeric lodgepole pine forest characteristic of mudflow and glacial outwash around Cascadian volcanoes".

== Ecology ==
365 acres (148 hectares) located on the northern edge of the NRA is dominated by a 350 year old forest of noble fir and Douglas fir that were spared by recent volcanic eruptions. This temperate rainforest contains tracts with average canopy heights of 213 feet (65 meters) and 44,584 cubic feet per acre (3,120 cubic meters per hectare) of living terrestrial biomass—the highest in the Pacific Northwest outside of the "Redwood Belt" of Northern California and among the highest the world

Goat Marsh RNA contains many of the largest and tallest remaining specimens of noble fir, including the "Goat Marsh Giant" (272 ft height, 8.3 ft DBH, 4,430 cubic feet volume), "Riker!" (253 ft height, 7.3 ft DBH, 3,810 cubic feet volume) and an unnamed fir 295 feet tall. This relatively small area of forest also contains douglas fir measured at over 300 feet in height.

Other conifers common within Goat Marsh RNA include western hemlock, Pacific silver fir, and western redcedar. Common understory vegetation includes vine maple, vanilla-leaf, and redwood sorrel. Wetland vegetation includes various species of sedges and grasses.
