= Chrysocercops squamosa =

Scientific classification
- Kingdom: Animalia
- Phylum: Arthropoda
- Class: Insecta
- Order: Lepidoptera
- Family: Gracillariidae
- Genus: Chrysocercops
- Species: C. squamosa

Binomial name
- Chrysocercops squamosa Kumata, 1992

Species of moth

Chrysocercops squamosa is a moth of the family Gracillariidae. It is known from Johor and Pahang, Malaysia.

The wingspan is 5.0–6.2 mm.

The larvae feed on Vatica pallida and Vatica pauciflora. They mine the leaves of their host plant.
