= Chrysocercops =

Scientific classification
- Kingdom: Animalia
- Phylum: Arthropoda
- Class: Insecta
- Order: Lepidoptera
- Family: Gracillariidae
- Subfamily: Acrocercopinae
- Genus: Chrysocercops; Kumata & Kuroko, 1988

Species
- See text

Genus of moths

Chrysocercops is a genus of moths in the family Gracillariidae.

== Etymology ==
Chrysocercops is derived from the Greek chrysos (gold), cercos (tail) and ops (eye).

== Species ==
- Chrysocercops argentata Kumata, 1992
- Chrysocercops azmii Kumata, 1992
- Chrysocercops castanopsidis Kumata & Kuroko, 1988
- Chrysocercops hopeella Kumata, 1992
- Chrysocercops leprosulae Kumata, 1992
- Chrysocercops lithocarpiella Kumata, 1992
- Chrysocercops malayana Kumata, 1992
- Chrysocercops melastigmata Kumata, 1992
- Chrysocercops neobalanocarpi Kumata, 1992
- Chrysocercops pectinata Kumata, 1992
- Chrysocercops shoreae Kumata, 1992
- Chrysocercops squamosa Kumata, 1992
- Chrysocercops thapai Kumata, 1992
- Chrysocercops vaticae Kumata, 1992
