= Illipe =

Vegetable fat from the seeds of various Plant species

Illipe butter is a vegetable fat from the nut (known as the "false illipe nut") of the Shorea stenoptera tree (now Rubroshorea stenoptera), sometimes used as a butter substitute. Borneo tallow nut oil is extracted from this species. The word Illipe is derived from the Tamil word for the tree Iluppai (இலுப்பை). The true illipe nut is from the species Madhuca latifolia; it is used for producing biodiesel, and Mowrah Butter is from Madhuca longifolia, Family Sapotaceae.
