= Chrysocercops shoreae =

Scientific classification
- Kingdom: Animalia
- Phylum: Arthropoda
- Class: Insecta
- Order: Lepidoptera
- Family: Gracillariidae
- Genus: Chrysocercops
- Species: C. shoreae

Binomial name
- Chrysocercops shoreae Kumata, 1992

Species of moth

Chrysocercops shoreae is a moth of the family Gracillariidae. It is known from Terengganu and Pahang, Malaysia.

The wingspan is 5–6.6 mm.

The larvae feed on Shorea materialis. They mine the leaves of their host plant.
