= Shorea superba =

Conservation status
- Vulnerable (IUCN 3.1)

Scientific classification
- Kingdom: Plantae
- Clade: Tracheophytes
- Clade: Angiosperms
- Clade: Eudicots
- Clade: Rosids
- Order: Malvales
- Family: Dipterocarpaceae
- Genus: Shorea
- Species: S. superba

Binomial name
- Shorea superba Symington

Species of tree

Shorea superba is a species of flowering plant in the family Dipterocarpaceae. It is a tree endemic to Borneo.

The species first described by Colin Fraser Symington in 1960. The species name is derived from Latin (superbus = magnificent) and refers to the stature and elegance of the tree.

== Description ==
It is a vast emergent tree, growing to 75 m tall, the tallest measured specimen is 84.4 m tall in the Tawau Hills National Park, in Sabah.

== Distribution ==
The species is found in mixed dipterocarp forest on well-structured clay soils in moist areas. It is endemic to Borneo, where it is threatened by habitat loss.

== See also ==
- List of Shorea species
