= Menara (tree) =

Yellow meranti tree in Sabah, Malaysia

Coordinates: 4.957885°N 117.866341°E

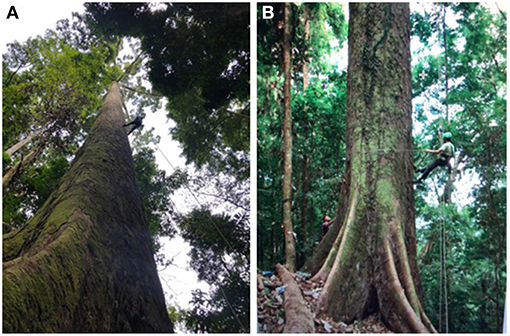
- Jamiluddin (Unding) bin Jami climbing the tree in January 2019 to verify its (A) height and (B) diameter above buttress. The tree is a Richetia faguetiana, located in the rainforests of Sabah, Malaysian Borneo.
- Interactive map of Menara
- Species: Richetia faguetiana
- Height: 97.58 m (320.1 ft)
- Girth: 6.65 m (21.8 ft)

Menara is the name of a yellow meranti tree (Richetia faguetiana) found in the Danum Valley Conservation Area, in Sabah, Malaysia. It was measured at 97.58 m (320.1 ft) from the average ground level at the base of the tree, and 100.8 m (331 ft) from the lowest point on the trunk, which ranks it as the world's tallest known living tropical tree and was the tallest known tree on the Asian continent until a taller South Tibetan cypress was found in the Yarlung Tsangpo Grand Canyon in 2023. The research team, working with Southeast Asia Rainforest Research Partnership (SEARRP), named the tree "Menara", which means "tower" in the Malay language due to its towering height.

Menara was discovered in August 2018. A research team scanned the tree in August 2018 with a terrestrial laser scanner and drone flights to produce a 3D model. On 6 January 2019, Unding Jami and his team established a measurement for the tree by climbing it and measuring its height using a tape measure. Menara is the second-tallest flowering plant in the world, slightly shorter than the record holder, the Centurion tree, a Eucalyptus regnans in Tasmania that is 100.5 m tall.

Menara weighs nearly 81,500 kilograms not counting its roots; 95% of this mass is located in the trunk, while 5% comes from the 40 meter-wide crown. The stem is extremely straight, with its center of mass at 28 m above the ground, which is just 0.6 m off from the central vertical axis. This indicates that the tree is highly symmetrical and well-balanced, even though it is sitting on a slope. Researcher Yalvinder Malhi stated in Mongabay that Sabah is a good place for trees to grow tall due to an absence of severe storms, hence the state's nickname "the land beneath the wind".

In 2020, Pos Malaysia Berhad released a stamp set featuring Menara. The set also includes a miniature sheet 18 centimetres in length, making it the largest stamp ever released by Pos Malaysia.

== See also ==
- List of tallest trees
- List of individual trees
- List of superlative trees
