= Chrysocercops melastigmata =

Scientific classification
- Kingdom: Animalia
- Phylum: Arthropoda
- Class: Insecta
- Order: Lepidoptera
- Family: Gracillariidae
- Genus: Chrysocercops
- Species: C. melastigmata

Binomial name
- Chrysocercops melastigmata Kumata, 1992

Species of moth

Chrysocercops melastigmata is a moth of the family Gracillariidae. It is known from Pahang, Malaysia.

The wingspan is 4.7–5.7 mm.

The larvae feed on Hopea nutans. They mine the leaves of their host plant.
