= Chrysocercops neobalanocarpi =

Scientific classification
- Kingdom: Animalia
- Phylum: Arthropoda
- Class: Insecta
- Order: Lepidoptera
- Family: Gracillariidae
- Genus: Chrysocercops
- Species: C. neobalanocarpi

Binomial name
- Chrysocercops neobalanocarpi Kumata, 1992

Species of moth

Chrysocercops neobalanocarpi is a moth of the family Gracillariidae. It is known from Negeri Sembilan, Malaysia.

The wingspan is 5.3–5.5 mm.

The larvae feed on Neobalanocarpus heimii. They mine the leaves of their host plant.
