= Chrysocercops thapai =

Scientific classification
- Kingdom: Animalia
- Phylum: Arthropoda
- Class: Insecta
- Order: Lepidoptera
- Family: Gracillariidae
- Genus: Chrysocercops
- Species: C. thapai

Binomial name
- Chrysocercops thapai Kumata, 1992

Species of moth

Chrysocercops thapai is a moth of the family Gracillariidae. It is known from Malaysia and Nepal.

The wingspan is 5.7–7 mm.

The larvae feed on Shorea robusta.
