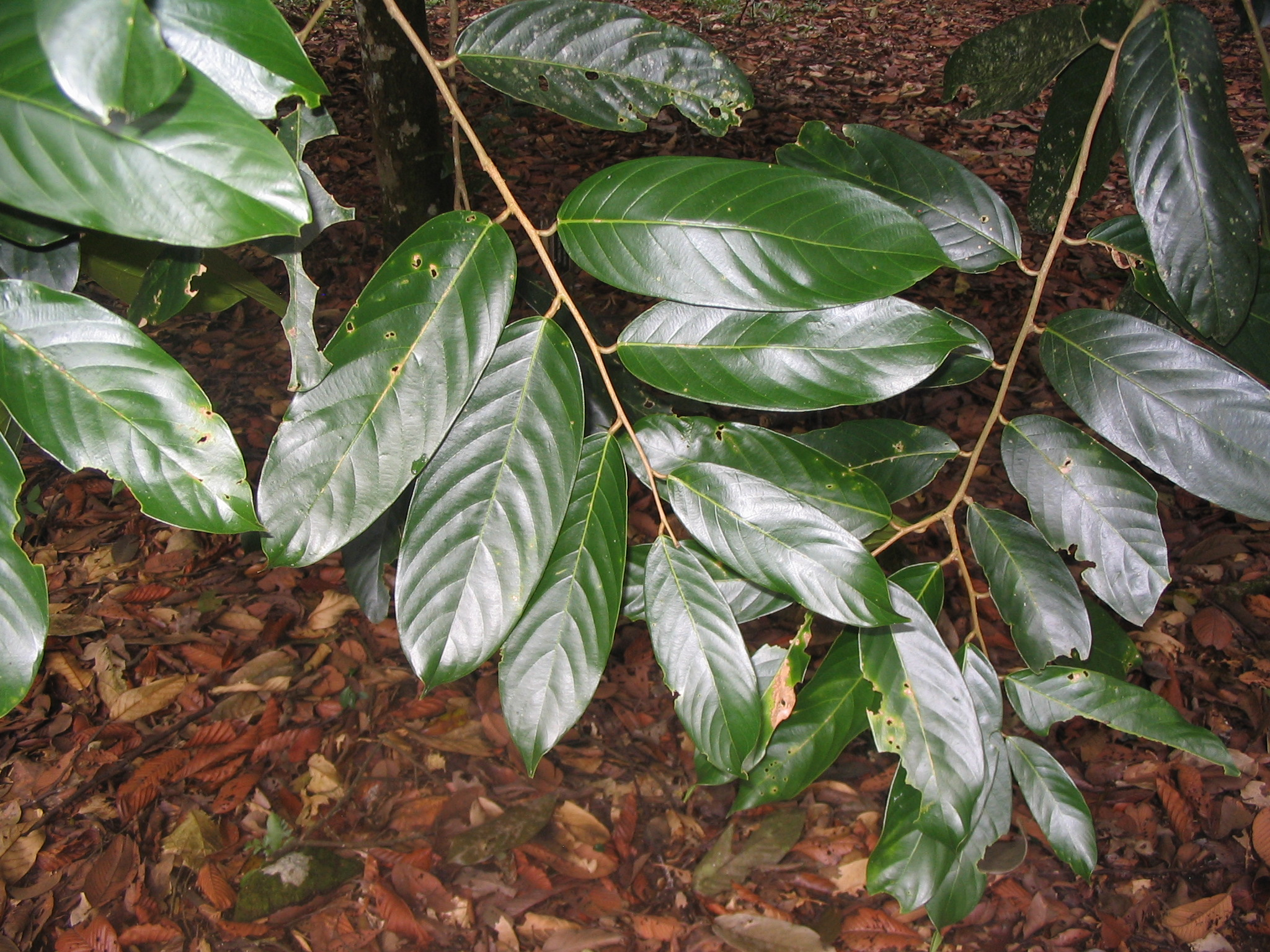
- Richetia maxima

Scientific classification
- Kingdom: Plantae
- Clade: Tracheophytes
- Clade: Angiosperms
- Clade: Eudicots
- Clade: Rosids
- Order: Malvales
- Family: Dipterocarpaceae
- Subfamily: Dipterocarpoideae
- Tribe: Shoreae
- Genus: Richetia; F.Heim

Species
- 33; see text

= Richetia =

Genus of flowering plants

Richetia is a genus of flowering plants in the family Dipterocarpaceae. It includes 33 species of trees native to Peninsular Thailand, Peninsular Malaysia, Sumatra, Borneo, and the Philippines.

The genus corresponds to the 'yellow meranti' group in the Dipterocarp timber classification system.

== Species ==
33 species are accepted.

- Richetia acuminatissima (Symington) P.S.Ashton & J.Heck.
- Richetia alutacea (P.S.Ashton) P.S.Ashton & J.Heck.
- Richetia angustifolia (P.S.Ashton) P.S.Ashton & J.Heck.
- Richetia bakoensis (P.S.Ashton) P.S.Ashton & J.Heck.
- Richetia balanocarpoides (Symington) P.S.Ashton & J.Heck.
- Richetia blumutensis (Foxw.) P.S.Ashton & J.Heck.
- Richetia chaiana (P.S.Ashton) P.S.Ashton & J.Heck.
- Richetia collaris (Slooten) P.S.Ashton & J.Heck.
- Richetia conica (Slooten) P.S.Ashton & J.Heck.
- Richetia coriacea F.Heim
- Richetia cuspidata (P.S.Ashton) P.S.Ashton & J.Heck.
- Richetia faguetiana (F.Heim) P.S.Ashton & J.Heck.
- Richetia faguetioides (P.S.Ashton) P.S.Ashton & J.Heck.
- Richetia gibbosa (Brandis) P.S.Ashton & J.Heck.
- Richetia hopeifolia (F.Heim) P.S.Ashton & J.Heck.
- Richetia iliasii (P.S.Ashton) P.S.Ashton & J.Heck.
- Richetia induplicata (Slooten) P.S.Ashton & J.Heck.
- Richetia kuantanensis (P.S.Ashton) P.S.Ashton & J.Heck.
- Richetia kudatensis (G.H.S.Wood ex Meijer) P.S.Ashton & J.Heck.
- Richetia laxa (Slooten) P.S.Ashton & J.Heck.
- Richetia longiflora (Brandis) P.S.Ashton & J.Heck.
- Richetia longisperma (Roxb.) P.S.Ashton & J.Heck.
- Richetia macrobalanos (P.S.Ashton) P.S.Ashton & J.Heck.
- Richetia maxima (King) P.S.Ashton & J.Heck.
- Richetia mujongensis (P.S.Ashton) P.S.Ashton & J.Heck.
- Richetia multiflora (Burck) P.S.Ashton & J.Heck.
- Richetia obovoidea (Slooten) P.S.Ashton & J.Heck.
- Richetia patoiensis (P.S.Ashton) P.S.Ashton & J.Heck.
- Richetia peltata (Symington) P.S.Ashton & J.Heck.
- Richetia polyandra (P.S.Ashton) P.S.Ashton & J.Heck.
- Richetia subcylindrica (Slooten) P.S.Ashton & J.Heck.
- Richetia tenuiramulosa (P.S.Ashton) P.S.Ashton & J.Heck.
- Richetia xanthophylla (Symington) P.S.Ashton & J.Heck.
