= Richetia gibbosa =

Conservation status
- Vulnerable (IUCN 3.1)

Scientific classification
- Kingdom: Plantae
- Clade: Tracheophytes
- Clade: Angiosperms
- Clade: Eudicots
- Clade: Rosids
- Order: Malvales
- Family: Dipterocarpaceae
- Genus: Richetia
- Species: R. gibbosa

Binomial name
- Richetia gibbosa (Brandis) P.S.Ashton & J.Heck. (2022)

Synonyms
- Hopea grisea Brandis (1895); Shorea gibbosa Brandis (1895)

Species of tree

Richetia gibbosa (also called yellow meranti) is a large emergent rainforest tree species in the family Dipterocarpaceae. It is native to southeastern Sumatra, Borneo, southern Peninsular Malaysia, and Singapore. The tallest measured specimen is 81.1 metres tall, in the Tawau Hills National Park, in Sabah on the island of Borneo.
