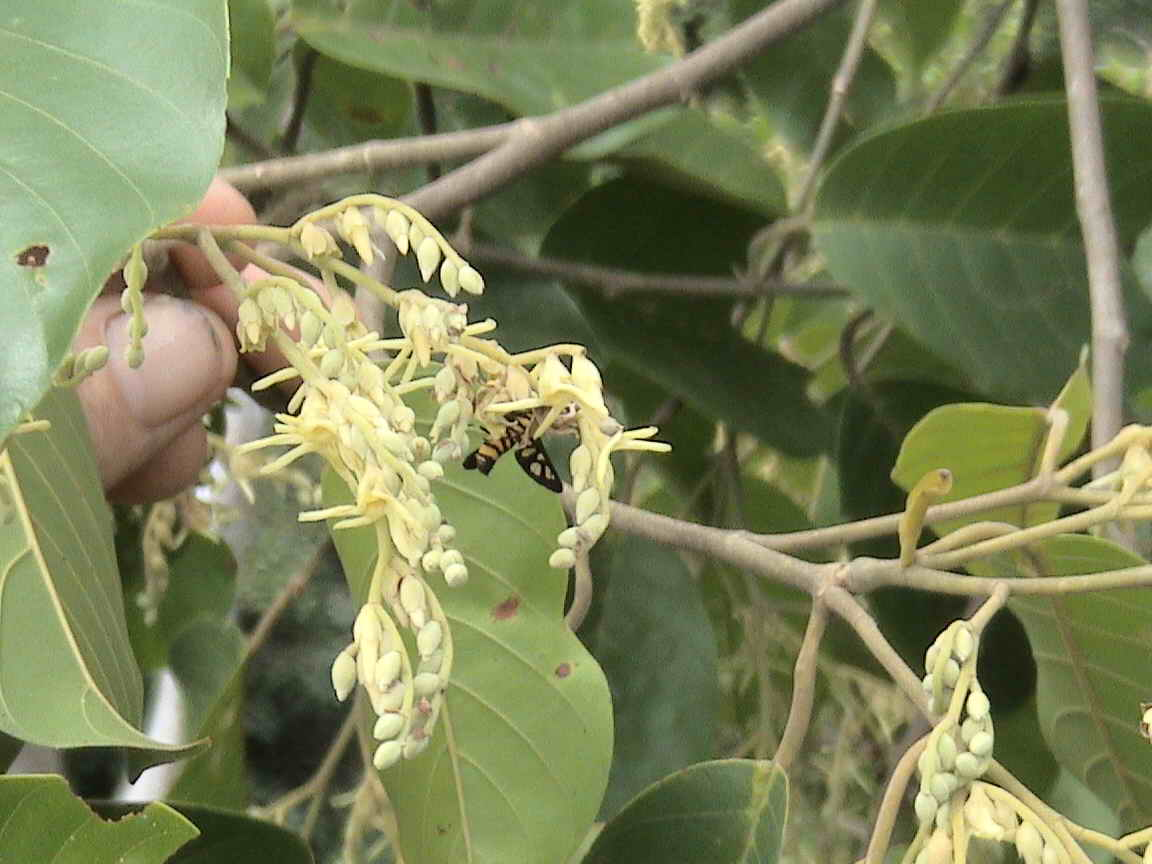

Conservation status
- Vulnerable (IUCN 3.1)

Scientific classification
- Kingdom: Plantae
- Clade: Tracheophytes
- Clade: Angiosperms
- Clade: Eudicots
- Clade: Rosids
- Order: Malvales
- Family: Dipterocarpaceae
- Genus: Rubroshorea
- Species: R. johorensis

Binomial name
- Rubroshorea johorensis (Foxw.) P.S.Ashton & J.Heck.

Synonyms
- Shorea johorensis Foxw. (basionym); Shorea leptoclados Symington

= Rubroshorea johorensis =

Species of flowering plant

Rubroshorea johorensis (also called seraya majau or meranti majau) is a species of plant in the family Dipterocarpaceae. It is a tree native to Borneo, Peninsular Malaysia (including Singapore) and Sumatra, where it grows in lowland rain forest up to 300 metres elevation.

== Description ==
It is a large emergent tree growing typically to 65 m tall. The tallest measured specimen is 82.4 m tall in the Tawau Hills National Park, in Sabah on the island of Borneo.
