= Borneo tallow nut oil =

Edible oil extracted from the fruit of species of genus Shorea

Borneo tallow nut oil or sal nut oil is extracted from the fruit of species of genus Shorea, which is native to Borneo, Java, Malaya and the Philippines. The oil is extracted from the egg-shaped, winged fruit using traditional methods in rural areas. The nuts, once extracted from the shell, are placed in a rattan bag, which is placed between two hardwood boards, and then pressed by driving in wedges. The oil is composed of the following fatty acids:

Fatty acid	Percentage
Palmitic acid	18.0%
Stearic acid	43.3%
Arachidic acid	1.1%
Oleic acid	37.4%
Linoleic acid	0.2%
