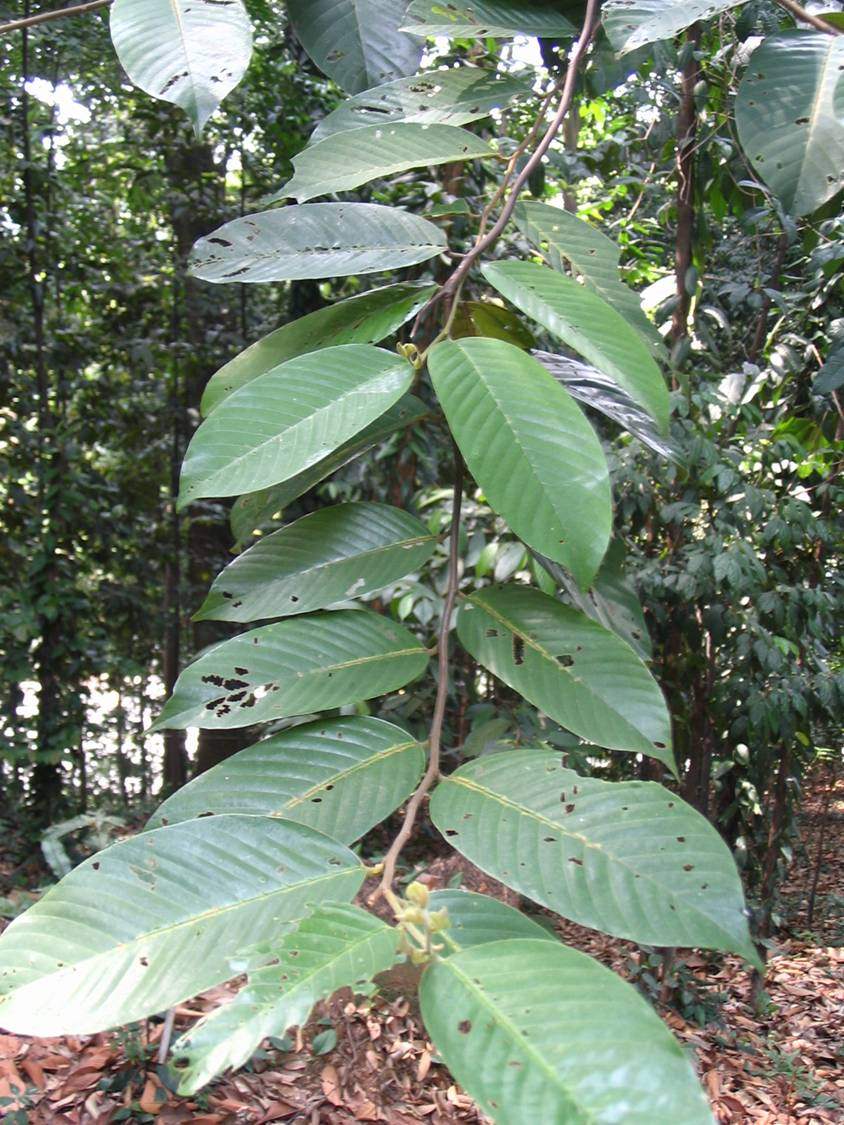

Conservation status
- Near Threatened (IUCN 3.1)

Scientific classification
- Kingdom: Plantae
- Clade: Embryophytes
- Clade: Tracheophytes
- Clade: Angiosperms
- Clade: Eudicots
- Clade: Rosids
- Order: Malvales
- Family: Dipterocarpaceae
- Genus: Rubroshorea
- Species: R. leprosula

Binomial name
- Rubroshorea leprosula (Miq.) P.S.Ashton & J.Heck.

Synonyms
- Shorea leprosula Miq.; Hopea maranti Miq.; Shorea astrosticta Scort. ex Foxw.; Shorea maranti (Miq.) Burck

= Rubroshorea leprosula =

Species of tree

Rubroshorea leprosula, synonym Shorea leprosula, (called, along with some other species in the genera Rubroshorea and Shorea, light red meranti) is a species of tree in the family Dipterocarpaceae. It is native to Sumatra, Borneo, Peninsular Malaysia, Java, and Thailand.

== Description ==
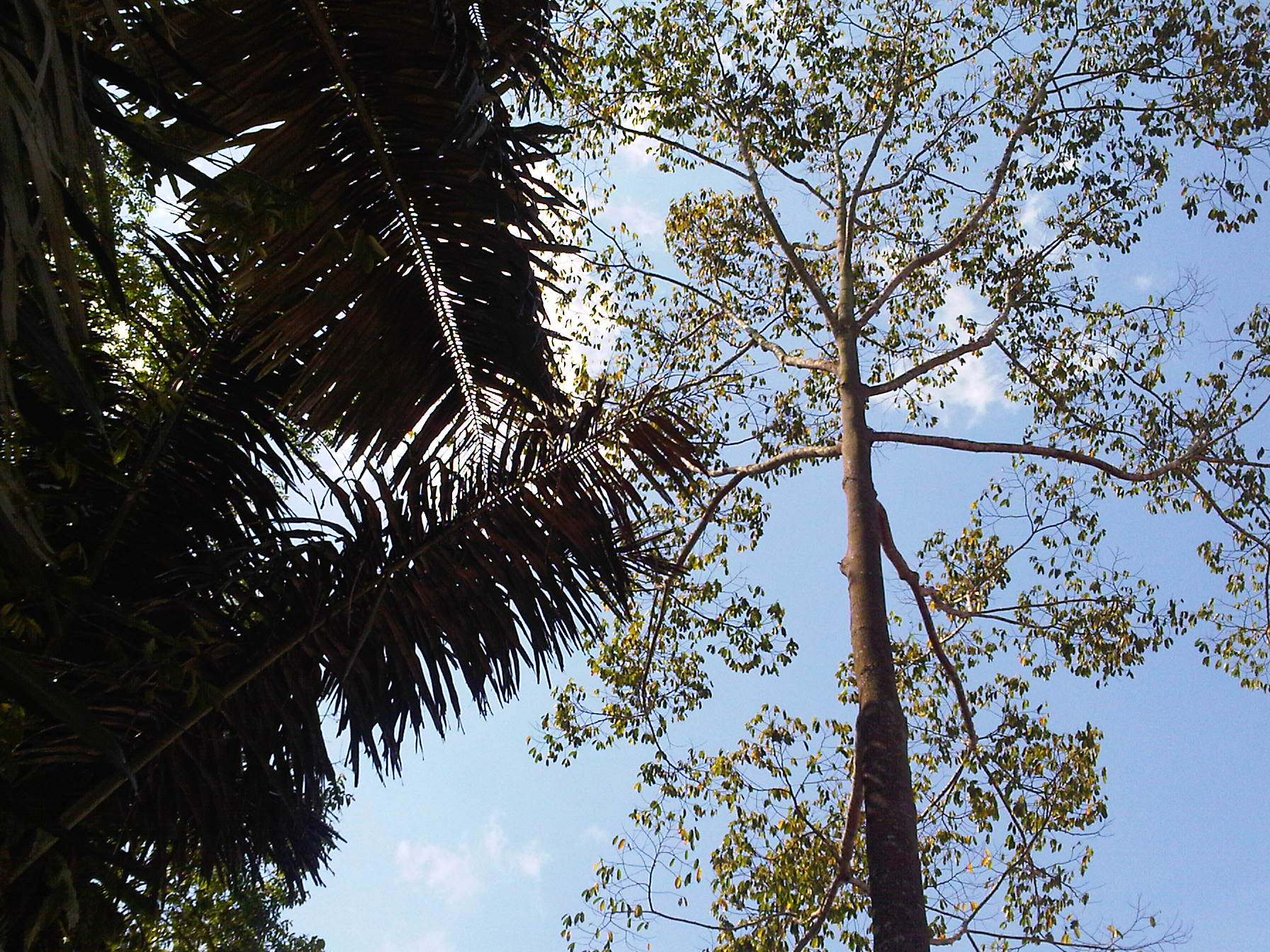
Crown

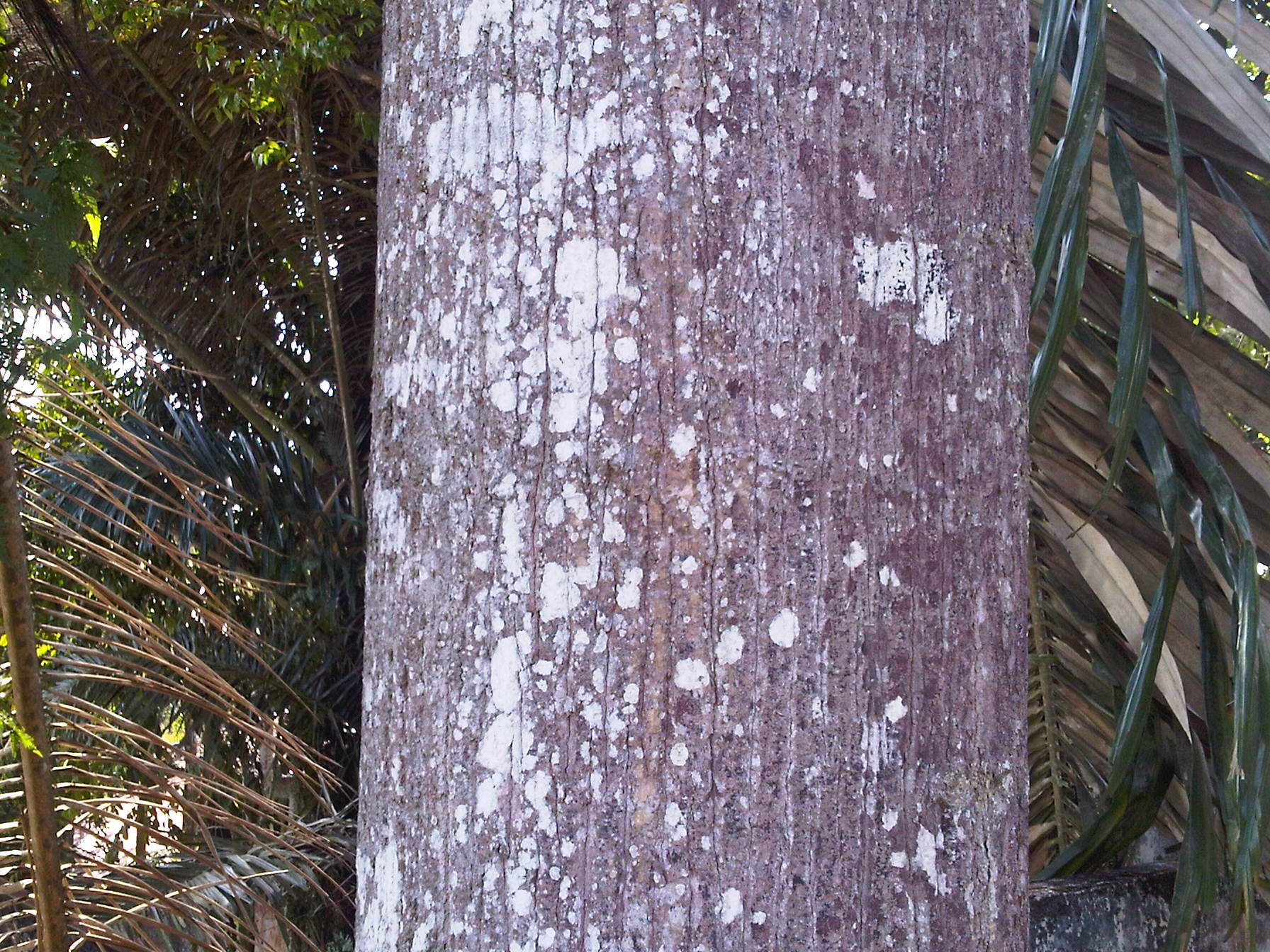
Bark

Trees reach up to 60 meters tall and 100 cm in diameter. Bark is greyish brown, shallowly fissured, and V-shaped. Outer bark is dull purple brown, hard, brittle. Inner bark is fibrous, dull brown or yellowish brown grading to pale at the cambium. Sapwood is pale or cream, resinous, while heartwood is dark red or light red brown. Its leaves are elliptic to ovate, 8–14 cm long, 3.5 to 5.5 cm wide. They are cream scaly, thinly leathery. Leaf base is obtuse or broadly cuneate, apex is acuminate, up to 8 mm long. Secondary vein comes in 12–15 pairs, and are slender, curved towards margin, set at 40 to 550. Tertiary veins are densely ladder-like, slender and obscure except in young trees. Stipules are 10 mm long, 35 mm wide, with short scars. They are horizontal, obscure, oblong to broadly hastate, obtuse, fugacious, and fall off early/ Fruit pedicel reaches 2 mm long. Calyx is sparsely pubescent, with 3 longer lobes up to 10 cm long, approximately 2 cm wide. They are spatulate, obtuse, approximate 5 mm broad above the 8 by 6 mm thickened elliptic, shallowly saccate base. Two shorter lobes are up to 5.5 cm long, approximately 0.3 cm wide, unequal, and similarly saccate at base.

== Distribution ==
They inhabit the Southeast Asia rain forest; from Peninsular Thailand throughout the Malay Peninsula (excluding the seasonal area), Sumatera, Bangka, Belitung, and Borneo.

== Ecology ==
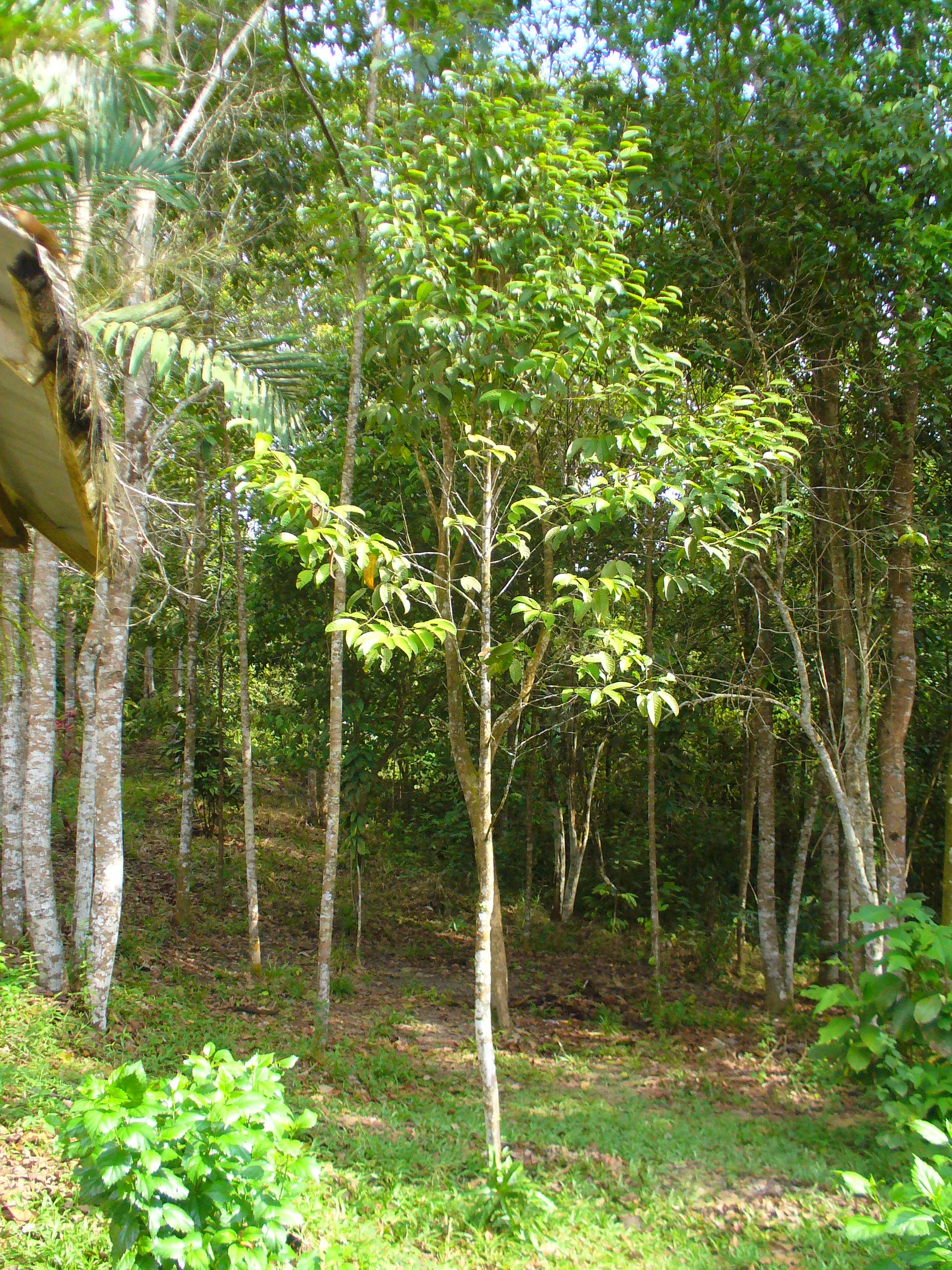
Rubroshorea leprosula plantation in Samboja Lestari area

Rubroshorea leprosula is one of the fastest growing Dipterocarp species up to about its twentieth year, when it is surpassed by other Dipterocarps. R. leprosula can grow in a variety of site conditions with flat topography. It is found throughout hilly areas, frequently on well-drained soil, on deep clay soils or swampy soil in the mixed Dipterocarp forest of lowlands and hill up to 700 meters (2,300 ft) above sea level, but it is a strongly light-demanding species.

One of the key successes for R. leprosula is light control. Light control should correspond to the light requirements of a species during its growing stages. Planting methods should reflect site conditions and growth characteristics of the species. R. leprosula is a light-demanding species at the early stage, 60–73% (relative light intensity) for seedlings and 74–100% for saplings.

== Vernacular names ==
The trade name for R. leprosula is known as red meranti or meranti merah. In Brunai and Sawarak: it is called meranti tembaga, perawan lop. In Malaya and Sumatra it is known as meranti betul, meranti bunga, meranti lempong, meranti tamak, meranti hijau, meranti sabut, merati kait, meranti sepang (Palembang). In Kutai it is called lampong, banti, barit, bekunsu, belaitok, belito, or damar. On Sampit: lentang. On Dayang Benuag: Mengkorau.

== Propagation ==
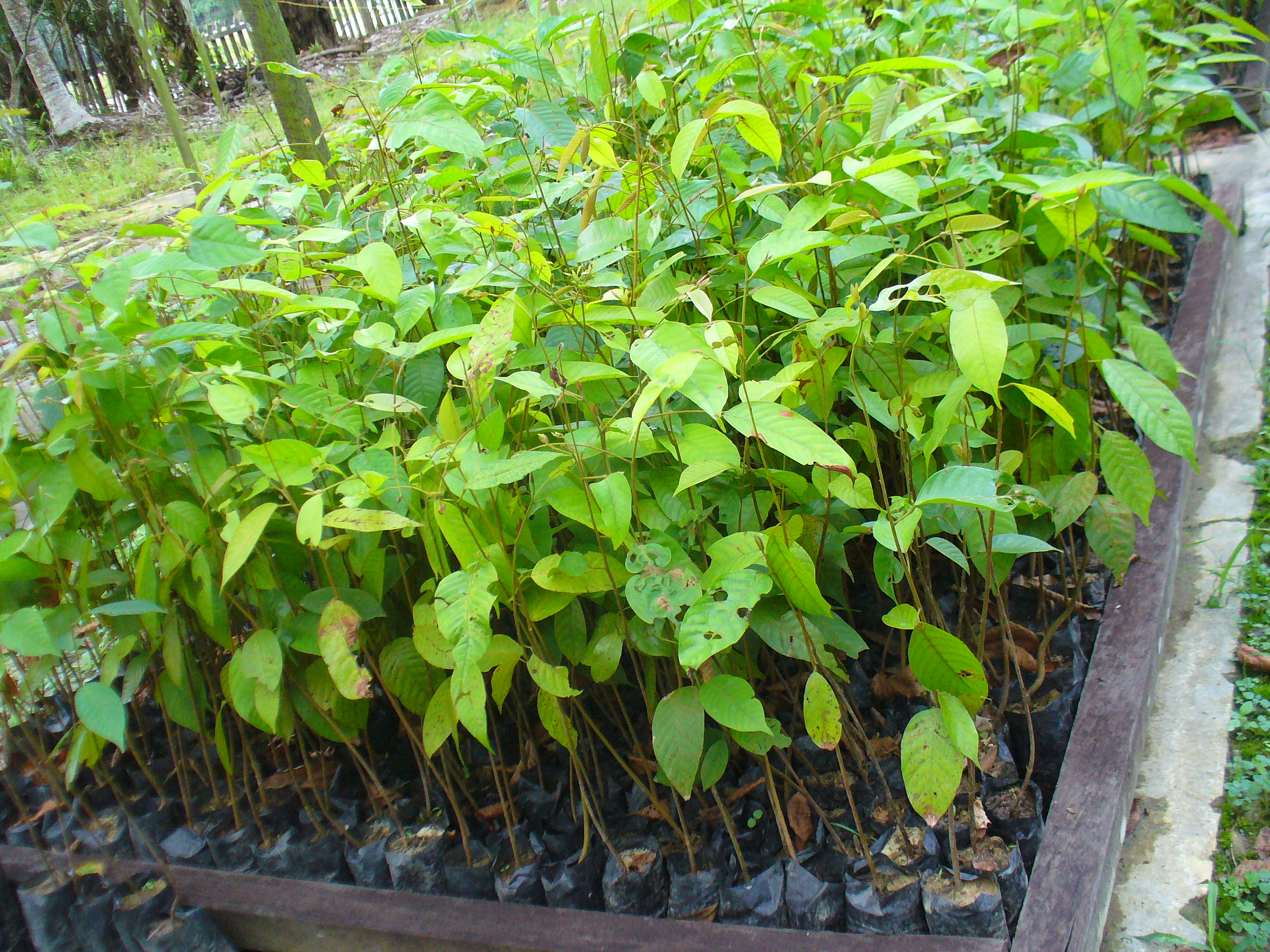
Seedlings in nursery Samboja

R. leprosula can be propagated by seeds, cuttings and wildlings.

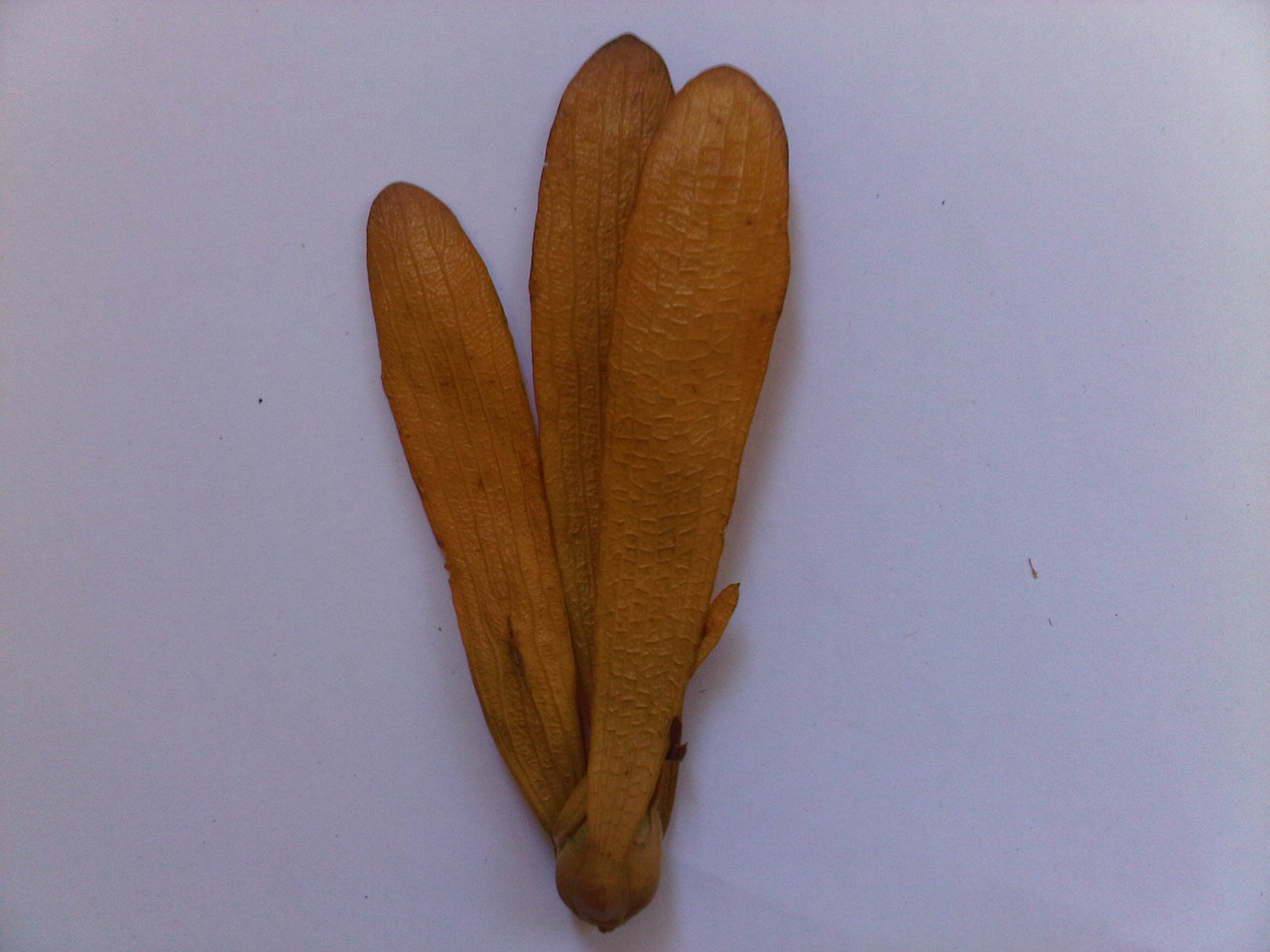
Fruit

== Uses ==
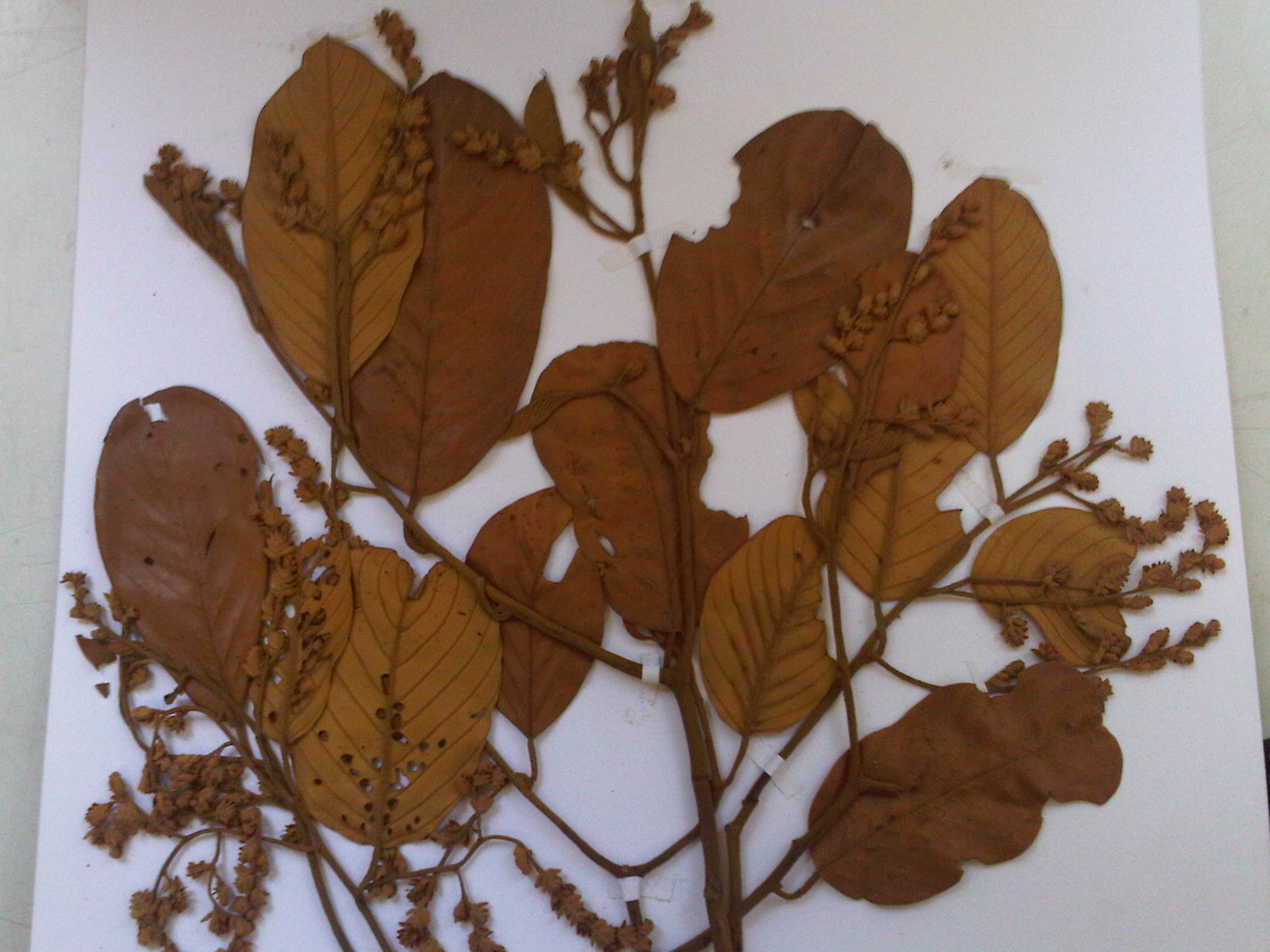
Material herbarium

The wood is used for construction.
