= Vanilla leaf =

Vanilla leaf is a common name for several plants and may refer to:

- Achlys, native to western North America and Japan
- Carphephorus odoratissimus, native to the southeastern United States
