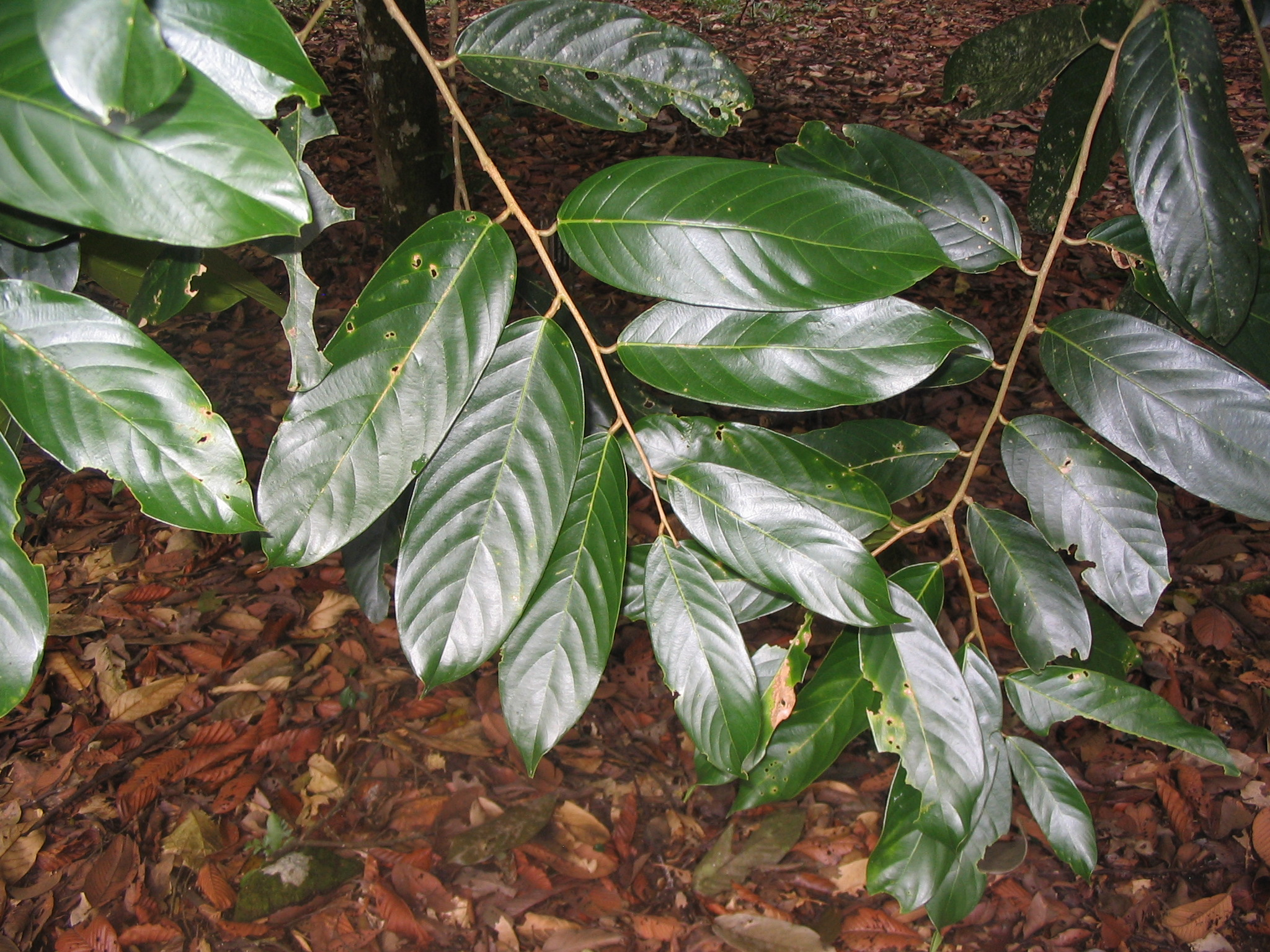

Conservation status
- Near Threatened (IUCN 3.1)

Scientific classification
- Kingdom: Plantae
- Clade: Tracheophytes
- Clade: Angiosperms
- Clade: Eudicots
- Clade: Rosids
- Order: Malvales
- Family: Dipterocarpaceae
- Genus: Richetia
- Species: R. maxima

Binomial name
- Richetia maxima (King) P.S.Ashton & J.Heck.

Synonyms
- Balanocarpus maximus King; Shorea maxima (King) Symington

= Richetia maxima =

Species of tree

Richetia maxima (also called yellow meranti) is a species of tree in the family Dipterocarpaceae. It is endemic to Peninsular Malaysia.
