= Rubroshorea smithiana =

Conservation status
- Vulnerable (IUCN 3.1)

Scientific classification
- Kingdom: Plantae
- Clade: Tracheophytes
- Clade: Angiosperms
- Clade: Eudicots
- Clade: Rosids
- Order: Malvales
- Family: Dipterocarpaceae
- Genus: Rubroshorea
- Species: R. smithiana

Binomial name
- Rubroshorea smithiana (Symington) P.S.Ashton & J.Heck.

Synonyms
- Shorea smithiana Symington

Species of tree from Borneo

Rubroshorea smithiana (called, along with some other dipterocarp species, light red meranti) is a large emergent rainforest tree species in the family Dipterocarpaceae. The species is endemic to Borneo. It is threatened by habitat loss. The tallest measured specimen is 82.3 m tall in the Tawau Hills National Park, in Sabah, Borneo.

The species was first described as Shorea smithiana by Colin Fraser Symington in 1938. In 2022 Peter Shaw Ashton and Jacqueline Heckenhauer placed the species in genus Rubroshorea as R. smithiana.
