= Rubroshorea argentifolia =

Conservation status
- Least Concern (IUCN 3.1)

Scientific classification
- Kingdom: Plantae
- Clade: Tracheophytes
- Clade: Angiosperms
- Clade: Eudicots
- Clade: Rosids
- Order: Malvales
- Family: Dipterocarpaceae
- Genus: Rubroshorea
- Species: R. argentifolia

Binomial name
- Rubroshorea argentifolia (Symington) P.S.Ashton & J.Heck.

Synonyms
- Shorea argentifolia Symington

Species of tree native to Borneo

Rubroshorea argentifolia (called, along with some other species in the genus Rubroshorea, dark red meranti) is an emergent rainforest tree species in the family Dipterocarpaceae. It native to Borneo. It grows in mixed dipterocarp forests on hills and ridges, up to 900 metres elevation. The species is threatened by habitat loss. The tallest recorded specimen is 84.9 m tall in the Tawau Hills National Park, in Sabah.

The species was first described as Shorea argentifolia by Colin Fraser Symington in 1960. In 2022 Peter Shaw Ashton and Jacqueline Heckenhauer placed the species in genus Rubroshorea as R. argentifolia.
