= Richetia coriacea =

Conservation status
- Vulnerable (IUCN 3.1)

Scientific classification
- Kingdom: Plantae
- Clade: Tracheophytes
- Clade: Angiosperms
- Clade: Eudicots
- Clade: Rosids
- Order: Malvales
- Family: Dipterocarpaceae
- Genus: Richetia
- Species: R. coriacea

Binomial name
- Richetia coriacea F.Heim

Synonyms
- Shorea richetia Symington

Species of tree native to Borneo

Richetia coriacea (synonym Shorea richetia) is a species of plant in the family Dipterocarpaceae. It is endemic to northwestern Borneo, including western Sarawak and a single location in western Kalimantan. It grows as a canopy tree, to 40 metres (130 ft) in height. It is native to lowland dipterocarp forests and heath forests. It has been recorded in protected areas, including Kubah National Park in Sarawak.
