= Hopea nutans =

Conservation status
- Near Threatened (IUCN 3.1)

Scientific classification
- Kingdom: Plantae
- Clade: Tracheophytes
- Clade: Angiosperms
- Clade: Eudicots
- Clade: Rosids
- Order: Malvales
- Family: Dipterocarpaceae
- Genus: Hopea
- Species: H. nutans

Binomial name
- Hopea nutans Ridl.

Species of tree

Hopea nutans is a large rainforest tree species in the family Dipterocarpaceae. It is found in Peninsular Malaysia and Borneo. The tallest measured specimen is 82.8 m tall in the Tawau Hills National Park, in Sabah on the island of Borneo. It grows in lowland and hill mixed dipterocarp rain forests and freshwater swamp forests, on periodically inundated sandy, limestone, and ultrabasic soils, up to 650 metres elevation.
