= Tawau Hills National Park =

Natural park in Tawau, Sabah

Tawau Hills Park
- IUCN category II (national park)
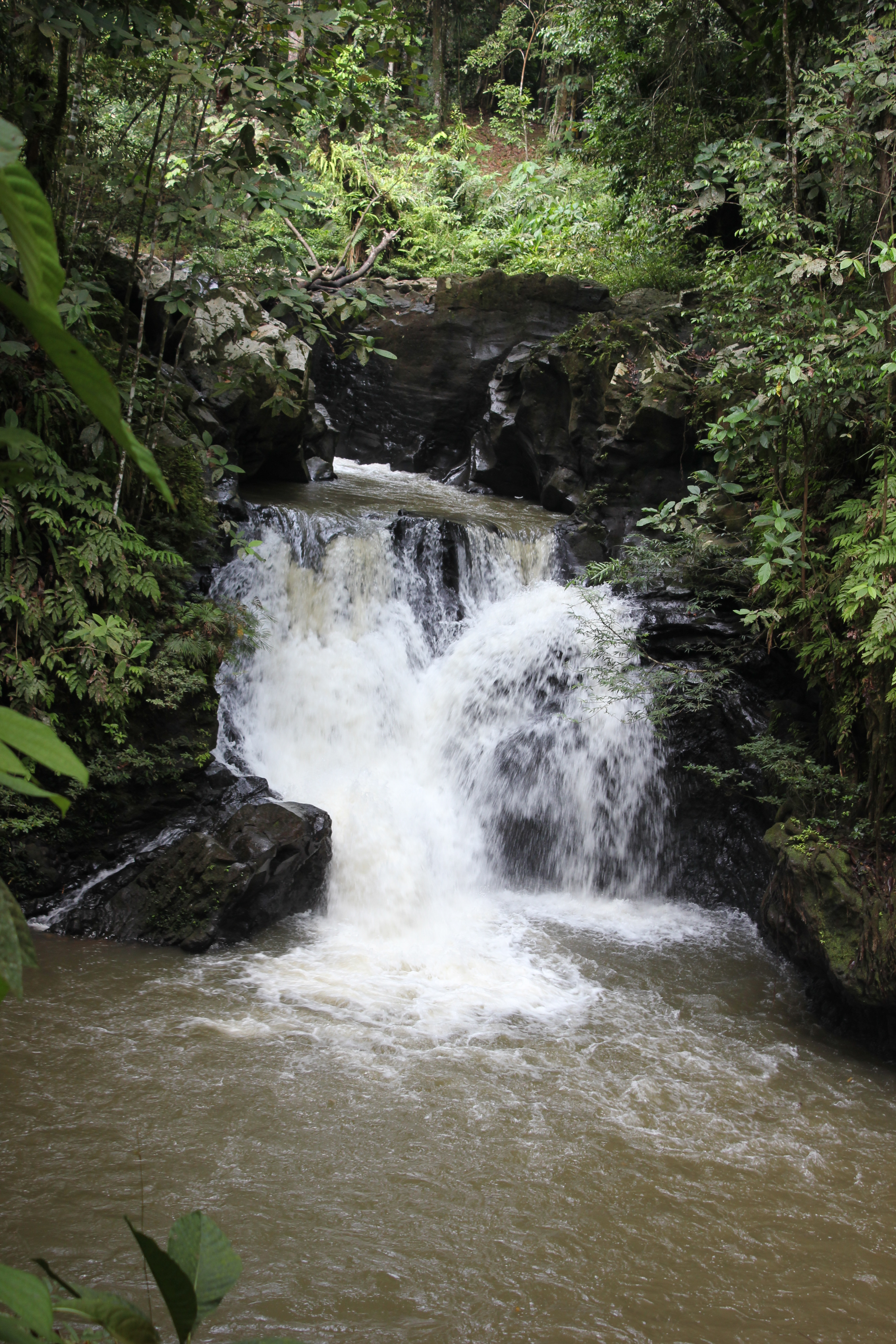
- Table Waterfall

- Location within Borneo
- Location: Sabah, Malaysia
- Nearest city: Tawau
- Coordinates: 4°24′N 117°54′E
- Area: 280 km^{2} (110 sq mi)
- Established: 1979
- Governing body: Sabah Parks

Tawau Hills Park was established in 1979, primarily as a protection for the water catchment area of Tawau town, Sabah, Malaysia. It is located 24 kilometres from Tawau, and comprises 279.72 km^{2} of lowland dipterocarp rainforest, surrounded by oil palm and cacao plantations. The park offers picnic areas, camping sites, and chalets. The Park contains rugged volcanic landscapes including a hot spring and spectacular waterfalls. The highest point in the park is Gunung Magdalena (1310 m). It is administered by the Sabah Parks.

== See also ==
- List of national parks of Malaysia
