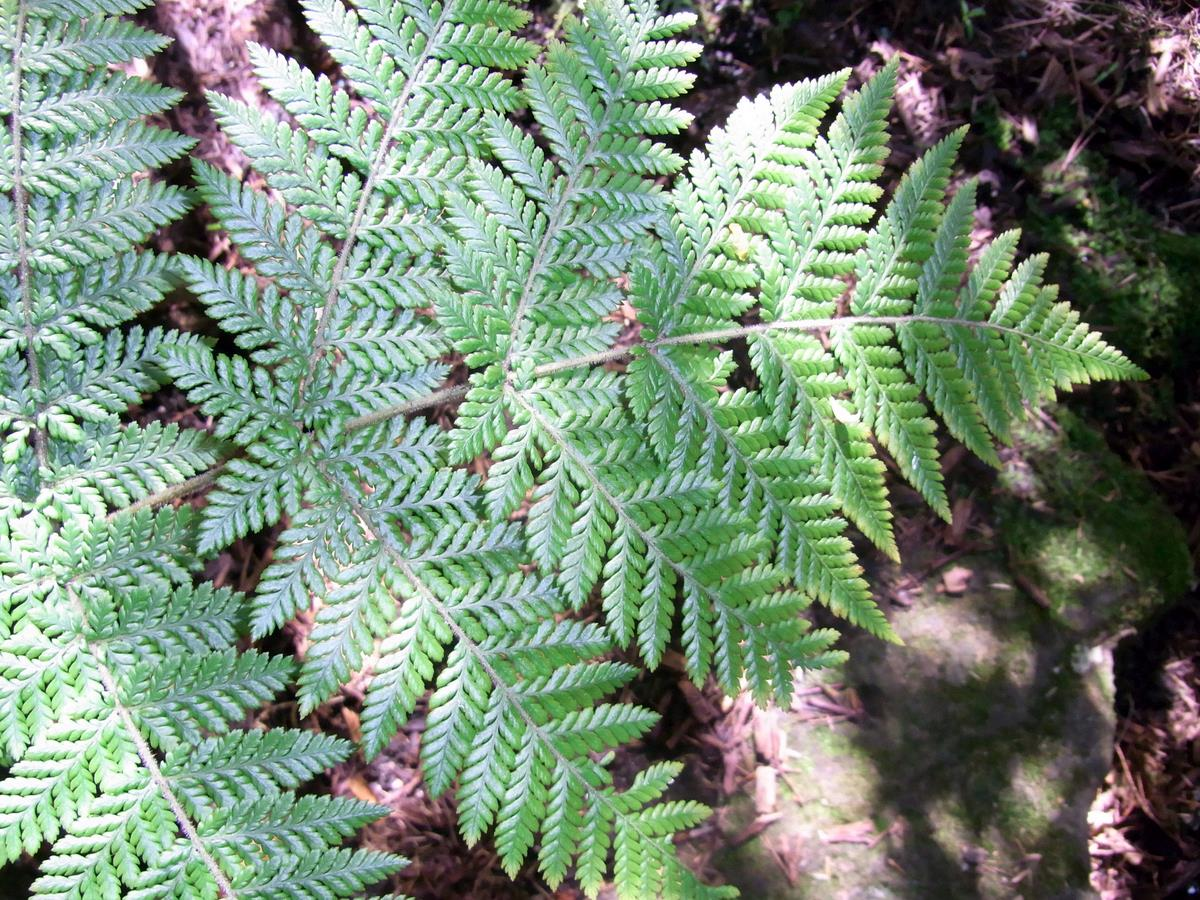
- Mountain shield fern at the Royal Botanic Gardens, Sydney, Australia

Scientific classification
- Kingdom: Plantae
- Clade: Tracheophytes
- Division: Polypodiophyta
- Class: Polypodiopsida
- Order: Polypodiales
- Suborder: Polypodiineae
- Family: Dryopteridaceae
- Genus: Lastreopsis
- Species: L. silvestris

Binomial name
- Lastreopsis silvestris D.A.Sm. ex Tindale

= Lastreopsis silvestris =

Species of fern

Lastreopsis silvestris, known as the mountain shield fern, is a rare plant found in eastern Australia. The habitat is high altitude rainforest on the McPherson Range, on the border of the states of New South Wales and Queensland. The habitat has high rainfall; mists and fogs are frequent. The original specimen was collected by Cyril Tenison White in December 1918, he described them as being “very abundant” .
