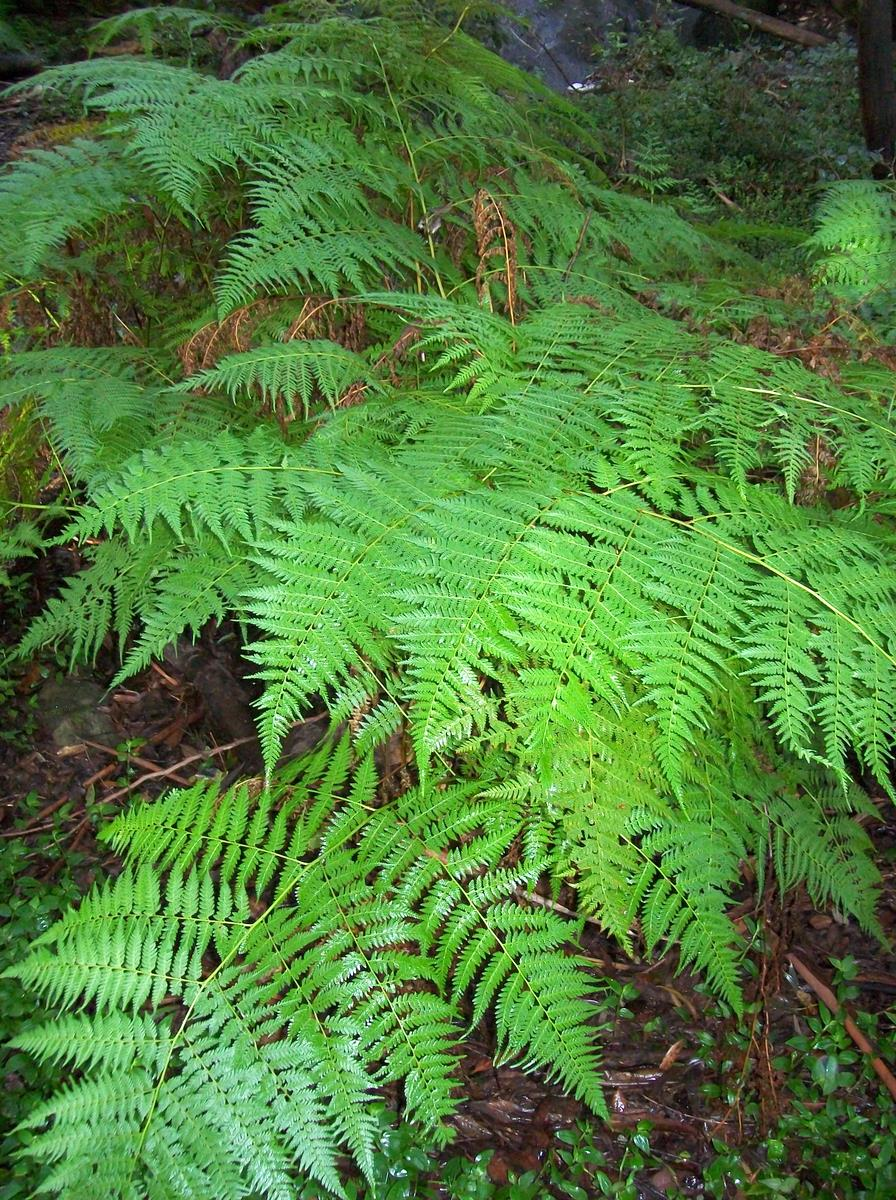
- Lastreopsis decomposita

Scientific classification
- Kingdom: Plantae
- Clade: Tracheophytes
- Division: Polypodiophyta
- Class: Polypodiopsida
- Order: Polypodiales
- Suborder: Polypodiineae
- Family: Dryopteridaceae
- Subfamily: Elaphoglossoideae
- Genus: Lastreopsis; Ching

Species
- See text.

Synonyms
- Coveniella Tindale

= Lastreopsis =

Genus of ferns

Lastreopsis, known as shieldfern, is a genus of ferns in the family Dryopteridaceae, subfamily Elaphoglossoideae, in the Pteridophyte Phylogeny Group classification of 2016 (PPG I).

== Species ==
As of November 2026, the Checklist of Ferns and Lycophytes of the World, World Flora Online, and Plants of the World Online accepted the following 20 species in Lastreopsis:

- Lastreopsis abscondita Perrie & Amice
- Lastreopsis amplissima (C.Presl) Tindale
- Lastreopsis davalliiformis (Tardieu) Tardieu
- Lastreopsis davallioides (Brack.) Tindale
- Lastreopsis decomposita (R.Br.) Tindale
- Lastreopsis dissecta (C.T.White & Goy) Labiak, Sundue & R.C.Moran
- Lastreopsis hispida (Sw.) Tindale
- Lastreopsis killipii (C.Chr. & Maxon) Tindale
- Lastreopsis marginans (F.Muell.) D.A.Sm. & Tindale ex Tindale
- Lastreopsis poecilophlebia (Hook.) Labiak, Sundue & R.C.Moran
- Lastreopsis silvestris D.A.Sm. ex Tindale
- Lastreopsis subrecedens Ching
- Lastreopsis subsericea (Mett.) Tindale
- Lastreopsis subsparsa (Alderw.) Tindale
- Lastreopsis tenera (R.Br.) Tindale
- Lastreopsis tripinnata (F.Muell. ex Benth.) Labiak, Sundue & R.C.Moran
- Lastreopsis velutina (A.Rich.) Tindale
- Lastreopsis vieillardii (Mett.) Tindale
- Lastreopsis walleri Tindale
- Lastreopsis wurunuran (Domin) Tindale

World Flora Online and Plants of the World Online also accepted Lastreopsis nephrodioides, recently transferred to Parapolystichum nephrodioides.
