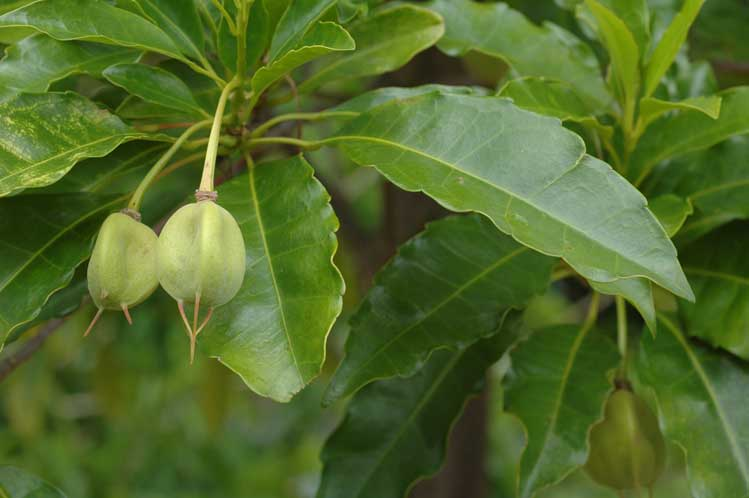

Conservation status
- Near Threatened (NCA)

Scientific classification
- Kingdom: Plantae
- Clade: Tracheophytes
- Clade: Angiosperms
- Clade: Eudicots
- Clade: Rosids
- Order: Oxalidales
- Family: Elaeocarpaceae
- Genus: Peripentadenia
- Species: P. mearsii

Binomial name
- Peripentadenia mearsii (C.T.White) L.S.Sm.

Synonyms
- Actephila mearsii C.T.White

= Peripentadenia mearsii =

Buff Quandong

Species of flowering plants

Peripentadenia mearsii, commonly known as the buff quandong or grey quandong, is a plant in the family Elaeocarpaceae endemic to a small part of northeastern Queensland, Australia. It is usually seen as a multistemmed tree, and the habitat is tropical rainforest.

== Description ==
Peripentadenia mearsii is a tree up to 20 m (66 ft) tall. The leaves are dark green above and paler below with toothed margins. They measure up to 14 cm (5.5 in) long by 5 cm (2.0 in) wide and are held on a petiole about 2 cm (0.79 in) long. The white flowers have 5 petals about 22 mm (0.87 in) long by 13 mm (0.51 in) wide, each with several lobes at their apices. The fruits are globose or ovoid capsules about 30 mm (1.2 in) long by 20 mm (0.79 in) wide, containing a single brown seed enclosed in a red aril.

=== Phenology ===
Flowering occurs in October, and the fruit ripen around December to March.

== Taxonomy ==
This species was first described (as Actephila mearsii) by the Australian botanist Cyril Tenison White in 1938, and published in 1939. White's description was based on samples of fruit and leaves only, and he placed the species in the family Euphorbiaceae. However, in 1957 another Australian botanist – Lindsay Stuart Smith – erected the new genus Peripentadenia within the family Elaeocarpaceae to accommodate this plant. At the time, it was the only species in the genus.

=== Etymology ===
The genus name Peripentadenia is constructed from the prefix 'peri-' (from Ancient Greek περί) meaning about or around; 'penta-' (from πέντε) meaning five; and 'adeno-' (from ἀδήν) meaning gland. it is a reference to the insertion of the stamens around five 'glands' in the flowers.

The species epithet mearsii is in honour Mrs J. E. Mears, who collected the first specimens of the plant in Millaa Millaa and brought them to the attention of the authors.

== Distribution and habitat ==
The buff quandong is restricted to the eastern and southern edges of the Atherton Tableland, southwest of Cairns. It mostly grows in mature rainforest, at altitudes from 100–1,400 m (330–4,590 ft).

== Ecology ==
Fruits of this species is eaten by cassowaries, musky rat-kangaroos, and king parrots.

== Gallery ==
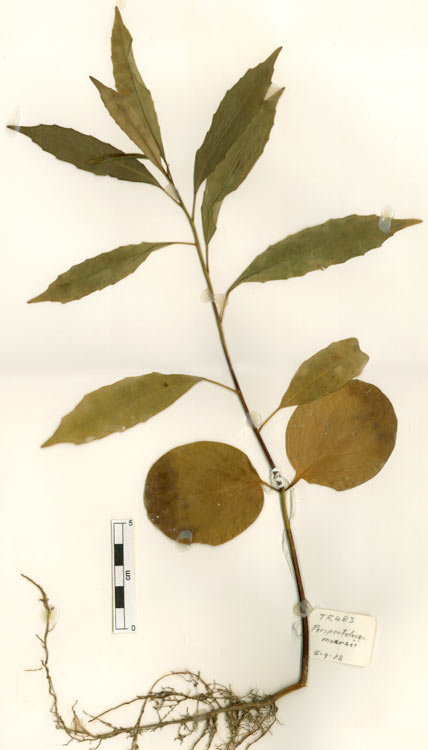
Seedling

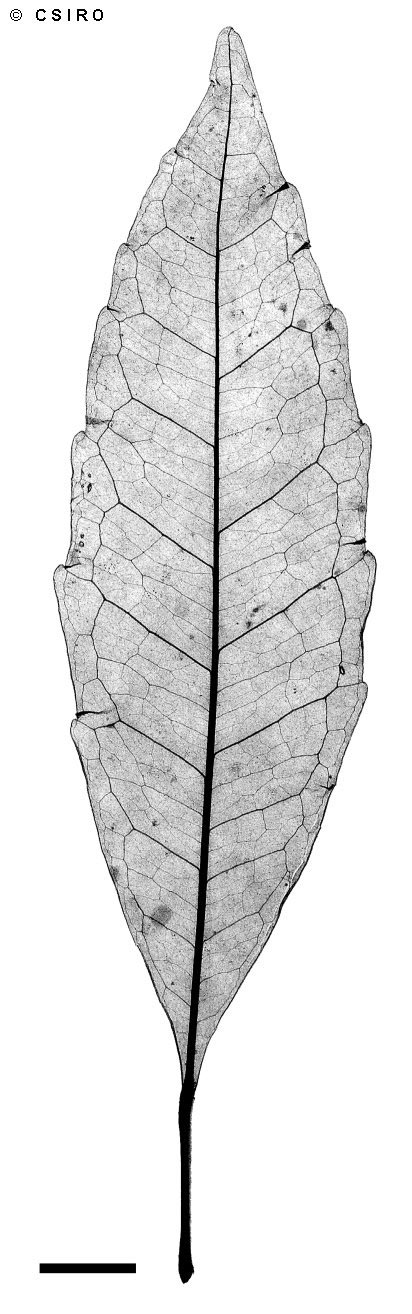
X-ray of leaf

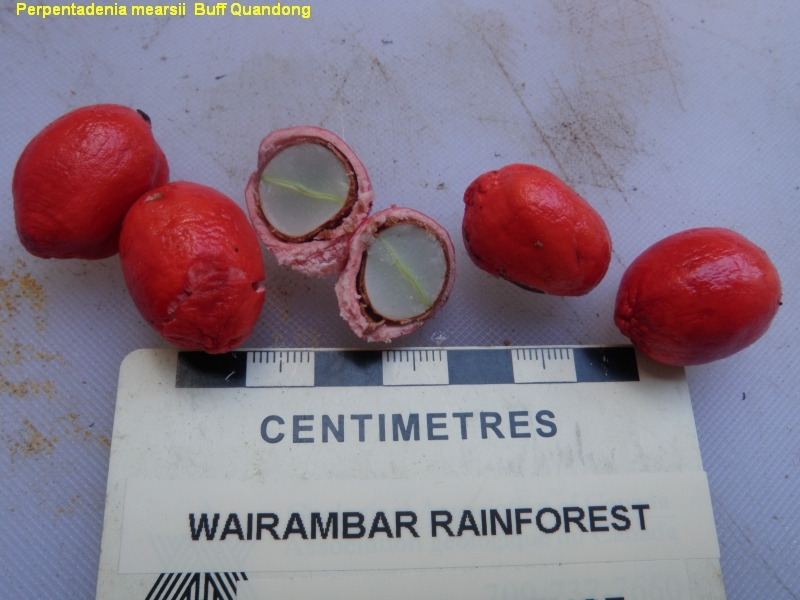
Fruit
