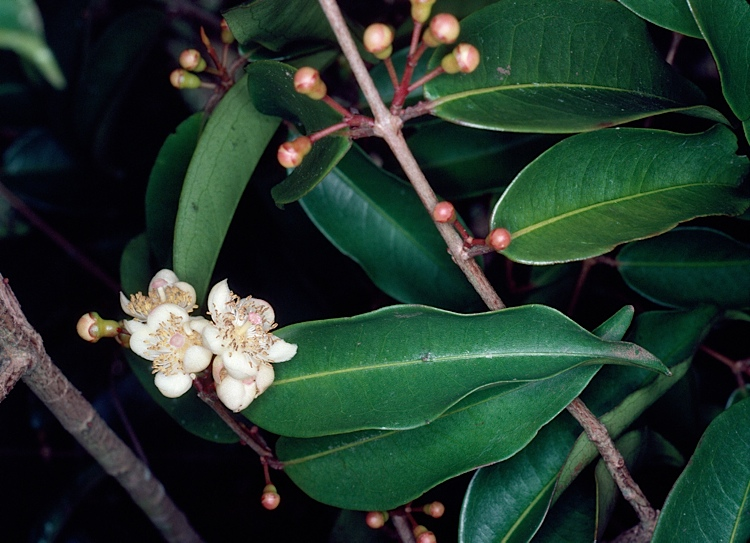
- Flowers and flower buds

Conservation status
- Least Concern (NCA)

Scientific classification
- Kingdom: Plantae
- Clade: Tracheophytes
- Clade: Angiosperms
- Clade: Eudicots
- Clade: Rosids
- Order: Myrtales
- Family: Myrtaceae
- Genus: Pilidiostigma
- Species: P. tropicum

Binomial name
- Pilidiostigma tropicum L.S.Sm.
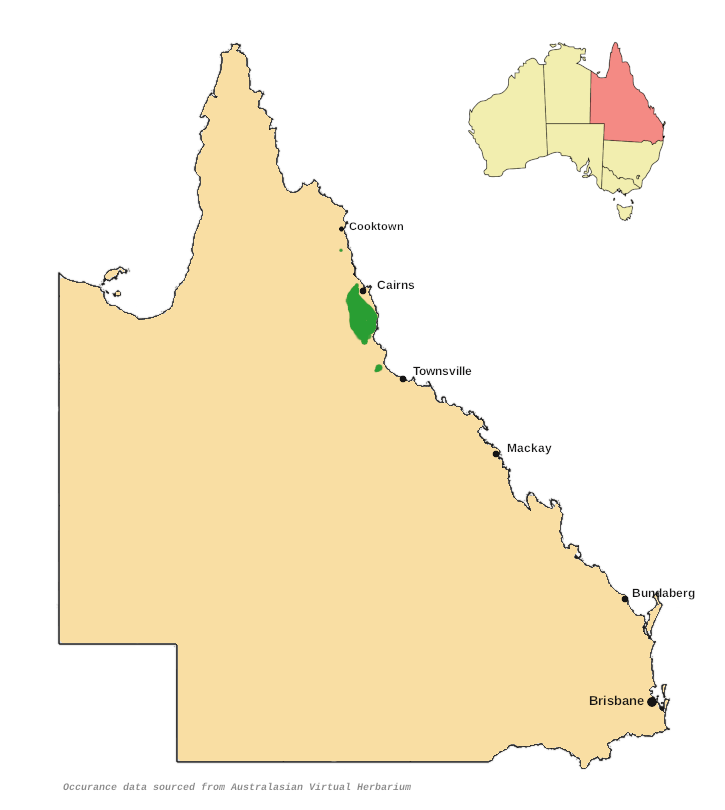

= Pilidiostigma tropicum =

Species of flowering plant

Pilidiostigma tropicum, commonly known as apricot myrtle, is a species of plant in the clove and eucalyptus family Myrtaceae. It is native to the Wet Tropics bioregion of Queensland, Australia, and was first described in 1955. It has a conservation status of least concern.

== Description ==
Pilidiostigma tropicum is a tree growing up to about 15 m (49 ft) tall with a trunk up to 20 cm (8 in) diameter. The leaves are arranged in opposite pairs on the twigs and measure up to 11 cm (4.3 in) long and 4 cm (1.6 in) wide. They are attached to the twigs on petioles which are channelled on the top, and the fine margins of the channel are sinuous and red in colour. The leaves have two, sometimes three, intramarginal veins (veins that run just inside and parallel to the leaf margin).

Flowers are borne on small racemes of two to six flowers, produced in the leaf axils. The calyx is about 4 mm (0.16 in) long and has five lobes. The five white petals are concave and almost circular in shape, about 7 mm (0.28 in) in diameter. There are numerous stamens; the ovary has two locules (chambers) with about seven ovules each, and the stigma is large and pink.

The fruit is a berry in botanical terms – it is black or purple in colour and is about 20 mm (0.8 in) long and 14 mm (0.6 in) wide. It contains up to eight seeds which are about 8 mm (0.3 in) long.

== Taxonomy ==
This species was described by botanist Lindsay Stuart Smith in 1955, and published in 1956. The type specimen was collected in 1929 near Glen Allyn on the Atherton Tableland, Queensland.

== Distribution and habitat ==
Pilidiostigma tropicum grows in rainforest as an understory tree, occurring on east coastal and sub-coastal parts of Queensland from just north of Cape Tribulation to just north of Townsville. It is widespread on the Atherton Tableland. The altitudinal range is from sea level to about 1,100 m (3,600 ft).

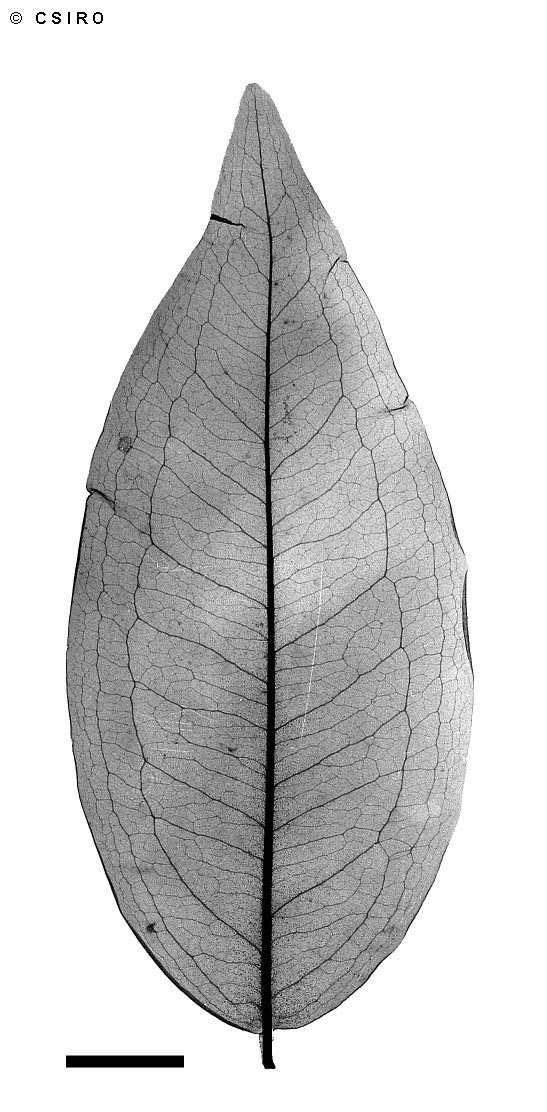
X-ray of a leaf

== Conservation ==
This species is listed as least concern under the Queensland Government's Nature Conservation Act. As of 28 June 2026, it has not been assessed by the International Union for Conservation of Nature (IUCN).
