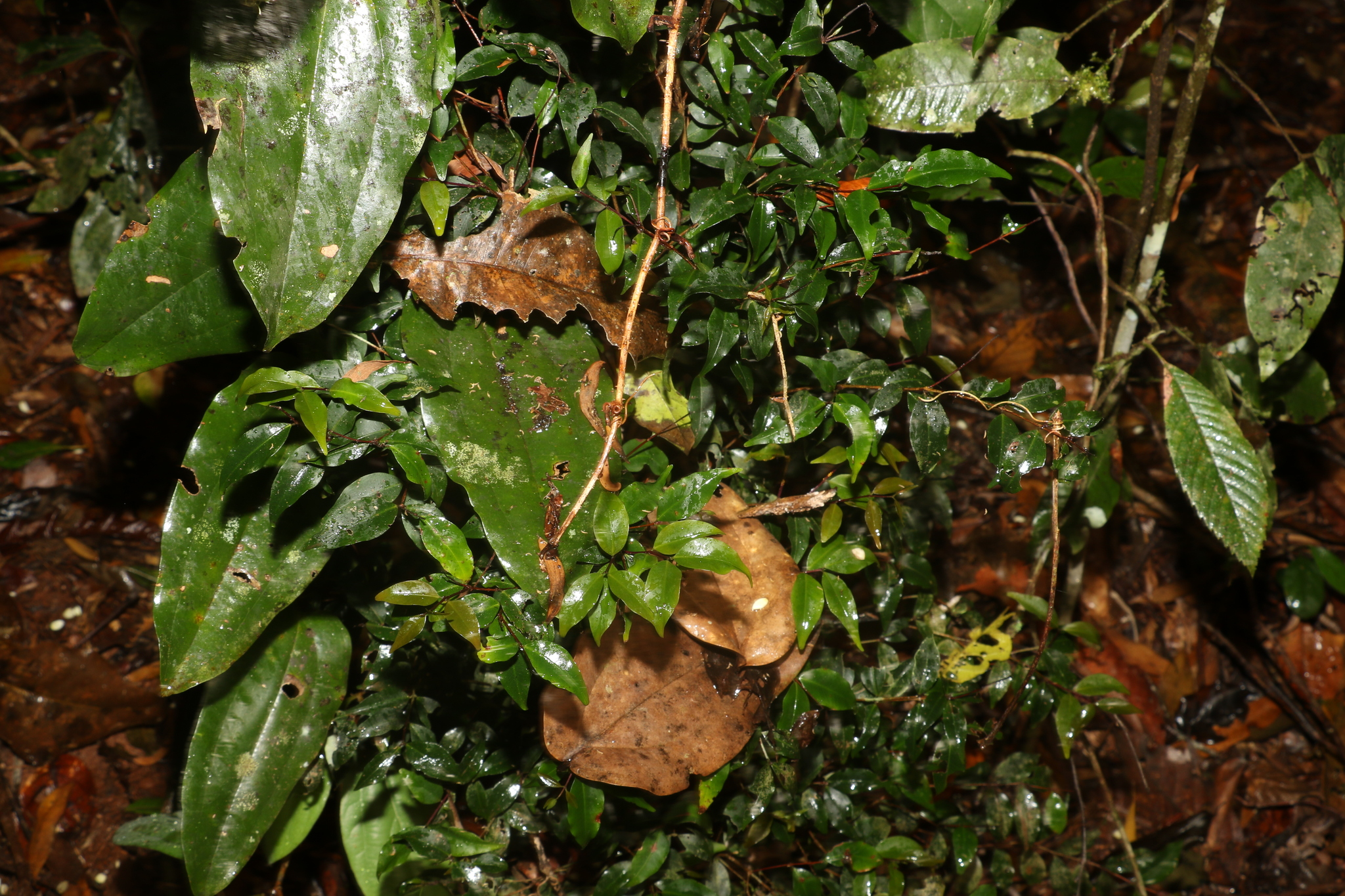
- Foliage

Conservation status
- Least Concern (NCA)

Scientific classification
- Kingdom: Plantae
- Clade: Embryophytes
- Clade: Tracheophytes
- Clade: Spermatophytes
- Clade: Angiosperms
- Clade: Eudicots
- Clade: Rosids
- Order: Myrtales
- Family: Myrtaceae
- Genus: Pilidiostigma
- Species: P. tetramerum

Binomial name
- Pilidiostigma tetramerum L.S.Sm.

= Pilidiostigma tetramerum =

Species of flowering plant

Pilidiostigma tetramerum is a species of plant in the clove and eucalyptus family Myrtaceae. It is native to the Wet Tropics bioregion of Queensland, Australia.

== Description ==
Pilidiostigma tetramerum is a shrub up to 4 m (13 ft) tall, or rarely a small tree. It usually begins to flower when about 2–3 m (6½–10 ft) tall. The leaves are arranged in opposite pairs on the twigs and measure up to 8 cm (3 in) long and 2.5 cm (1 in) wide. There are two intramarginal veins, and the lateral veins are somewhat obscured.

Flowers are produced, either singly or in racemes, in the leaf axils. They have four white petals which are more or less circular in shape and measure about 2.5 mm (0.10 in) in diameter. The fruit is a dark red-purple or black berry, about 15 mm (0.6 in) long and 20 mm (0.8 in) wide.

== Taxonomy ==
It was first described in 1959 by botanist Lindsay Stuart Smith.

== Distribution and habitat ==
This species is endemic to northeast Queensland, where it grows in well-developed rainforest at altitudes from sea level to about 1,200 m (3,900 ft). It occurs from near Cooktown to about Ingham.

== Conservation ==
This species is listed as least concern under the Queensland Government's Nature Conservation Act. As of 29 June 2026, it has not been assessed by the International Union for Conservation of Nature.

== Gallery ==
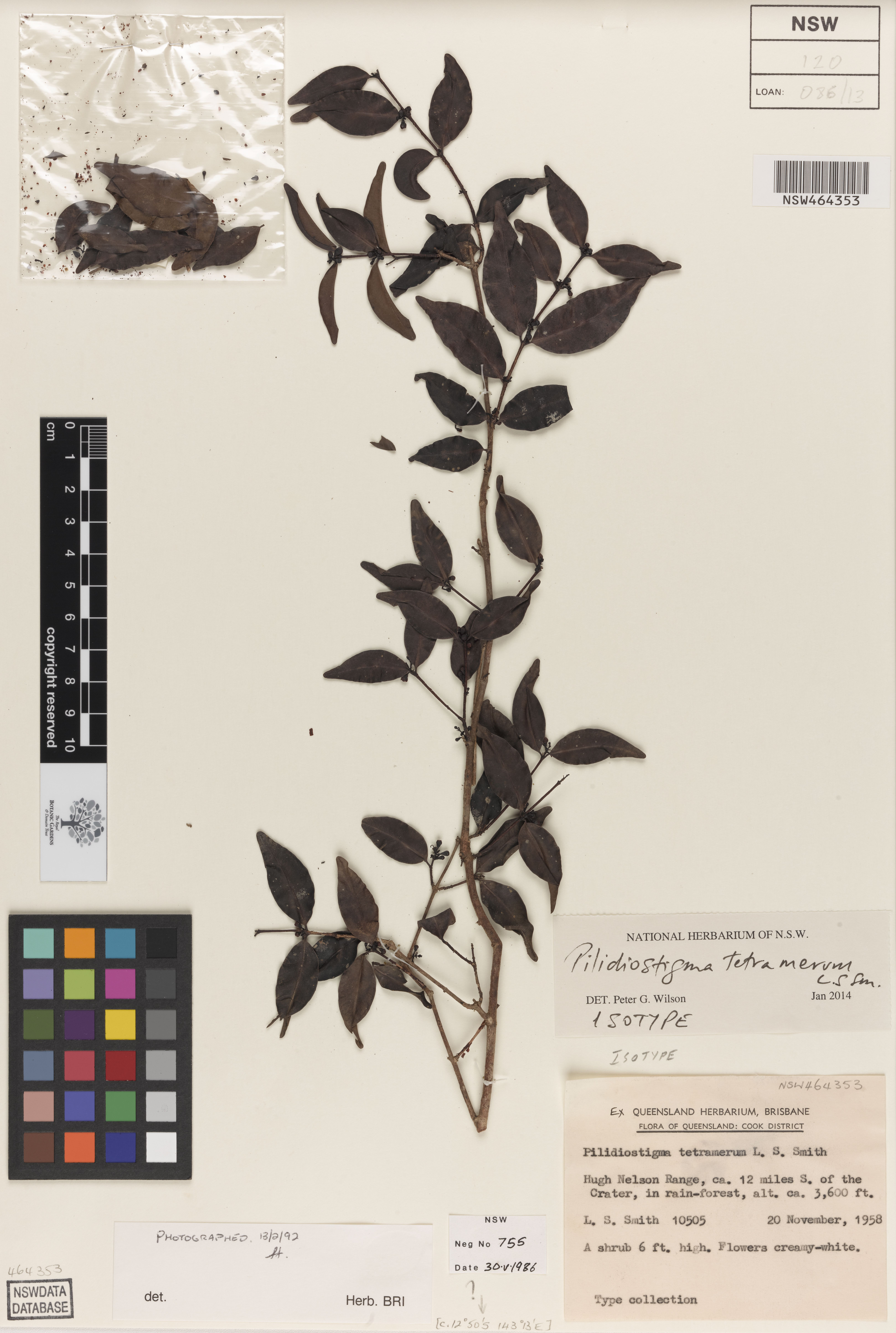
Isotype held at the New South Wales herbarium

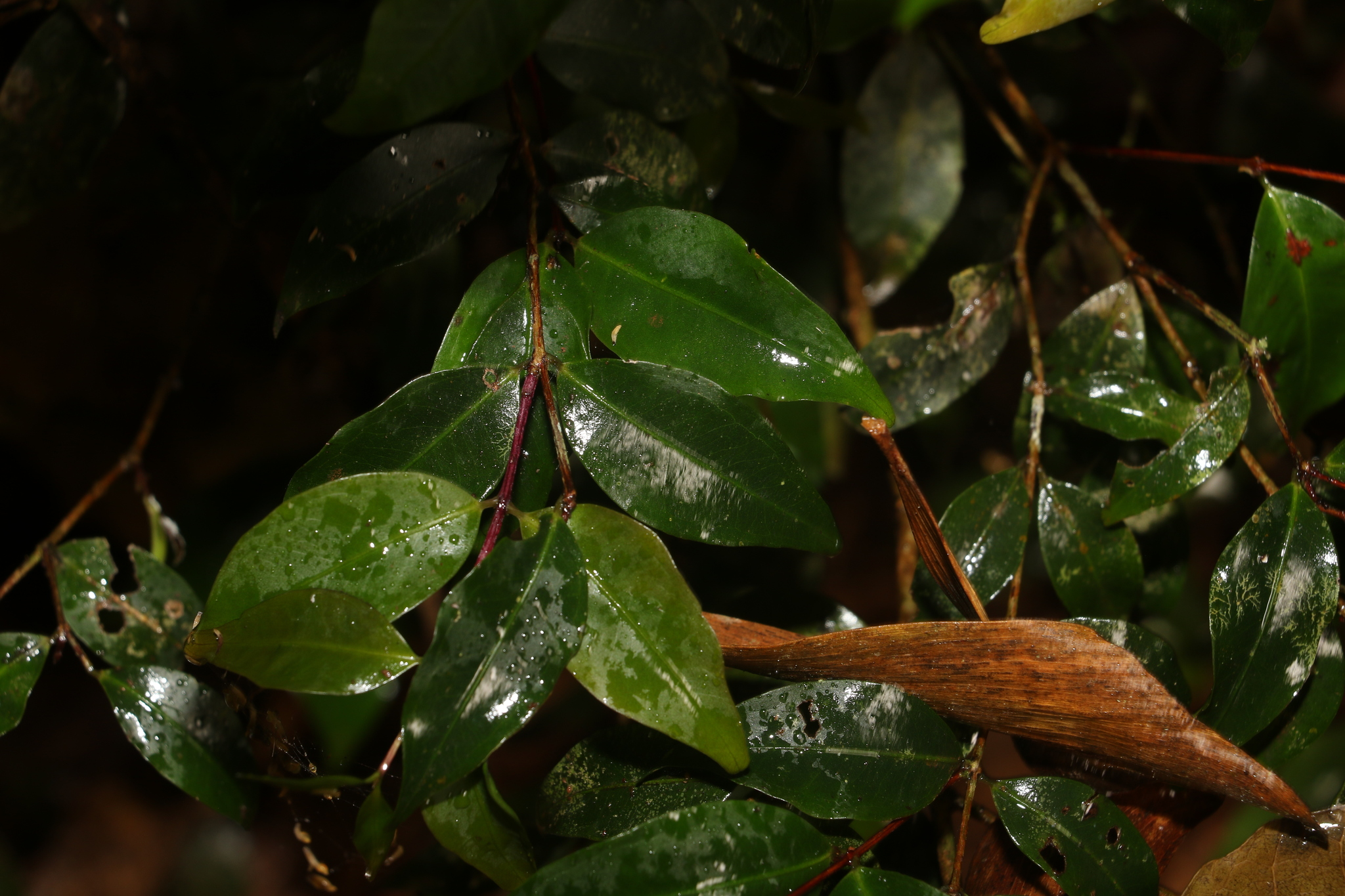
Foliage

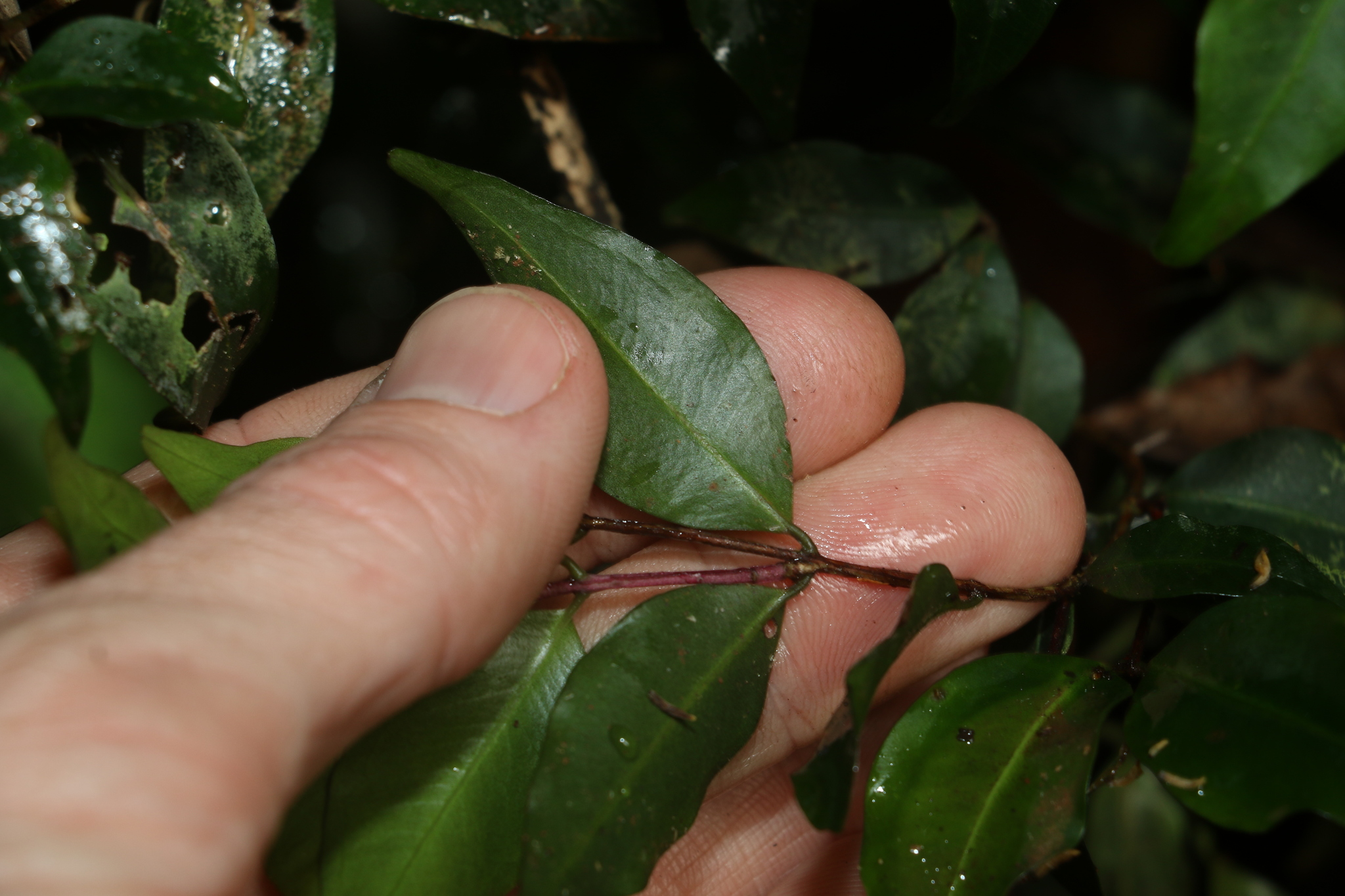
Foliage
