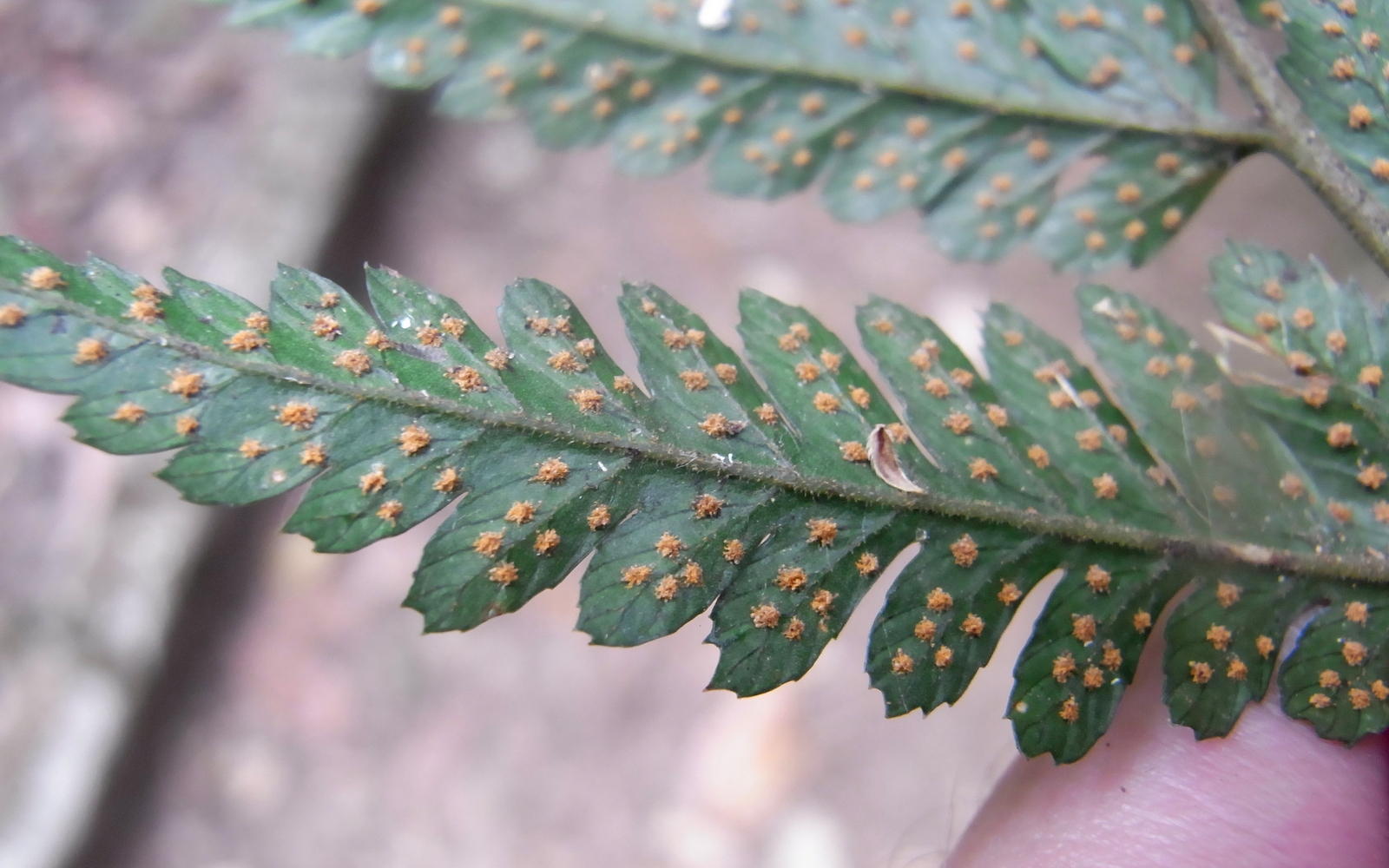
- at Mount Warning National Park, Australia

Scientific classification
- Kingdom: Plantae
- Clade: Tracheophytes
- Division: Polypodiophyta
- Class: Polypodiopsida
- Order: Polypodiales
- Suborder: Polypodiineae
- Family: Dryopteridaceae
- Genus: Lastreopsis
- Species: L. marginans

Binomial name
- Lastreopsis marginans (F.Muell.) D.A.Sm. & Tindale

= Lastreopsis marginans =

Glossy Shield Fern

Species of fern

Lastreopsis marginans, known as the glossy or bordered shield fern is a fern found in eastern Australia. The habitat is rainforest or wet sclerophyll forest. Fronds are crowded and erect, between 50 and 90 cm long, coloured a glossy dark green. The lectotype was collected near the Clarence River by Hermann Beckler.
