= Elaeocarpus stellaris =

Hard quandong

Scientific classification
- Kingdom: Plantae
- Clade: Tracheophytes
- Clade: Angiosperms
- Clade: Eudicots
- Clade: Rosids
- Order: Oxalidales
- Family: Elaeocarpaceae
- Genus: Elaeocarpus
- Species: E. stellaris

Binomial name
- Elaeocarpus stellaris L.S.Sm.

Species of tree endemic to Queensland

Elaeocarpus stellaris is a species of flowering plant in the family Elaeocarpaceae and is endemic to north-eastern Queensland. It is a tree, sometimes with buttress roots at the base of the trunk, elliptic to egg-shaped leaves, small groups of flowers with greenish-yellow sepals and creamy-white petals, the fruit containing a five-flanged stone.

== Description ==
Elaeocarpus stellaris is a tree that typically grows to a height of 25 m (82 ft) with a dbh of 30 cm (12 in) but sometimes up to 50 cm (20 in) and sometimes with buttress roots at the base of the trunk. The leaves are elliptic to egg-shaped, 100–175 mm (3.9–6.9 in) long and 40–80 mm (1.6–3.1 in) wide on a petiole 30–50 mm (1.2–2.0 in) long. The flowers are borne in groups of two to five on a robust rachis up to 20 mm (0.79 in) long, each flower on a ridged pedicel 10–15 mm (0.39–0.59 in) long. The sepals are greenish-yellow, 22–25 mm (0.87–0.98 in) long and 4–6 mm (0.16–0.24 in) wide and velvelty-hairy on the back. The petals are creamy-white, about 24 mm (0.94 in) long and 10 mm (0.39 in) wide, with three broad, blunt lobes on the end. There are about fifty stamens. Flowering occurs in December and the fruit is an elliptical drupe about 6 mm (0.24 in) long and 4 mm (0.16 in) wide containing a stone with five longitudinal flanges. This species is similar to E. bancroftii apart from the flanged stone.

== Taxonomy ==
Elaeocarpus stellaris was first formally described in 1969 by Lindsay Stuart Smith in Contributions from the Queensland Herbarium from material he collected Gregory Falls west of Innisfail.

== Distribution and habitat ==
This quandong grows in well-developed rainforest at altitudes between 50 and 50 m (160 and 160 ft) in north-eastern Queensland.

== Conservation status ==
This quandong is listed as of "least concern" under the Queensland Government Nature Conservation Act 1992.
