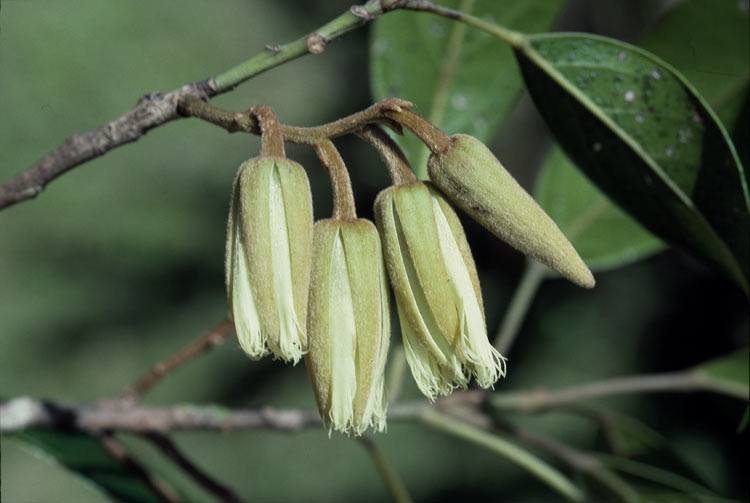

Scientific classification
- Kingdom: Plantae
- Clade: Tracheophytes
- Clade: Angiosperms
- Clade: Eudicots
- Clade: Rosids
- Order: Oxalidales
- Family: Elaeocarpaceae
- Genus: Elaeocarpus
- Species: E. linsmithii

Binomial name
- Elaeocarpus linsmithii Guymer

= Elaeocarpus linsmithii =

Species of tree endemic to Queensland

Elaeocarpus linsmithii is a species of flowering plant in the family Elaeocarpaceae and is endemic to north-east Queensland. It is a shrub with oblong to elliptic leaves, white or pale green flowers and oval fruit.

== Description ==
Elaeocarpus linsmithii is a shrub that typically grows to a height of 1.5–2.5 m (4.9–8.2 ft) with a dbh of less than 30 cm (12 in). The leaves are leathery, oblong to elliptic, 85–130 mm (3.3–5.1 in) long and 25–50 mm (0.98–1.97 in) wide on a petiole 20–45 mm (0.79–1.77 in) long. The flowers are arranged in racemes of six to thirteen on a rachis 50–110 mm (2.0–4.3 in) long, each flower on a pedicel 16–22 mm (0.63–0.87 in) long. The flowers are white or pale green, 25–30 mm (0.98–1.18 in) long with five narrow oblong to lance-shaped sepals 20–26 mm (0.79–1.02 in) long, 3–3.5 mm (0.12–0.14 in) wide and densely covered with silky brown hairs on the outside. The five petals are egg-shaped with the narrower end towards the base, 22–27 mm (0.87–1.06 in) long and 5–98 mm (0.20–3.86 in) wide and there are between twenty-eight and thirty-five stamens. Flowering occurs from April to June and the fruit is a more or less oval drupe 15–20 mm (0.59–0.79 in) long and 12–15 mm (0.47–0.59 in) wide.

== Taxonomy ==
Elaeocarpus linsmithii was first formally described in 1984 by Gordon P. Guymer in the Kew Bulletin. The specific epithet (linsmithii) honours Lindsay Stuart Smith.

== Distribution and habitat ==
Elaeocarpus linsmithii grows in rainforest at altitudes of 1,000 to 1,500 m (3,300 to 4,900 ft) in the Mount Spurgeon - Mount Lewis area and near the summit of Mount Bartle Frere in north-eastern Queensland.

== Conservation status ==
Elaeocarpus linsmithii is listed as of "least concern" under the Queensland Government Nature Conservation Act 1992.
