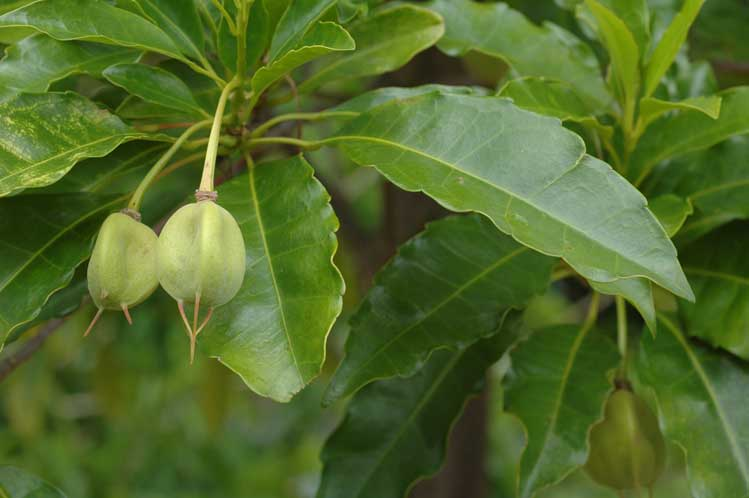
- P. mearsii fruit
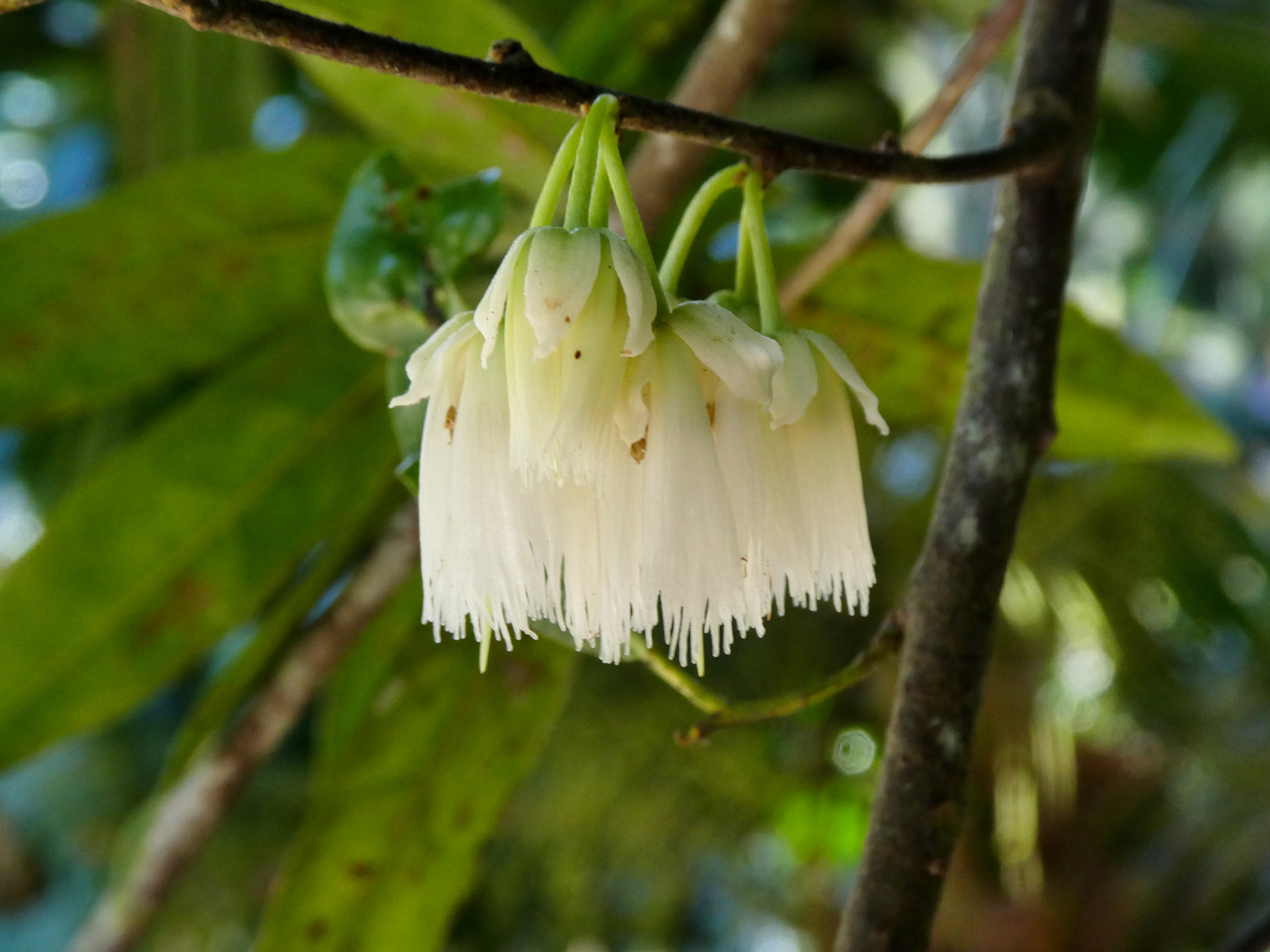
- P. phelpsii flowers

Scientific classification
- Kingdom: Plantae
- Clade: Tracheophytes
- Clade: Angiosperms
- Clade: Eudicots
- Clade: Rosids
- Order: Oxalidales
- Family: Elaeocarpaceae
- Genus: Peripentadenia; L.S.Sm.

Type species
- Peripentadenia mearsii (C.T.White) L.S.Sm.

Species
- See text

= Peripentadenia =

Genus of trees

Peripentadenia is a genus of two species of plants from the family Elaeocarpaceae endemic to the rainforests of northeastern Queensland, Australia. Both species have at-risk conservation statuses.

== Description ==
Plants in this genus are large, often buttressed trees reaching up to 35 m (115 ft) in height. They are mostly glabrous (without hairs); leaves are simple (i.e. without lobes or divisions), arranged spirally on the twigs, and have petioles that are often swollen at both ends; flowers are solitary or grouped in loose clusters and have five petals; fruit are capsules which split open at maturity; seeds one or rarely two, enclosed in a red aril.

== Taxonomy ==
This genus was erected in 1957 by Australian botanist Lindsay Stuart Smith when he reviewed the species Actephila mearsii, which was described by Cyril Tenison White in 1938. At the time of White's naming, Actephila was placed in a large and polyphylletic family Euphorbiaceae. The immediate result of Smith's review was to move the species out of both the genus and the family, and place it in the family Elaeocarpaceae under his newly-erected genus. The closest relatives to Peripentadenia are thought to be Crinodendron and Dubouzetia.

=== Etymology ===
The name Peripentadenia is derived from the Ancient Greek words perí (about), pentă (five), and hădḗn (gland). It refers to the arrangement of the stamens around the five-lobed floral disc.

== Species ==
- Peripentadenia mearsii (C.T.White) L.S.Sm. – Near threatened
- Peripentadenia phelpsii B.Hyland & Coode – Vulnerable

== Distribution ==
Both species grow in rainforest in the Wet Tropics bioregion of Queensland. P. mearsii mostly occurs on the eastern edge of the Atherton Tableland from about Millaa Millaa to about Gadgarra, with a small outlying group in Mount Lewis National Park. P. phelpsii mostly occurs around the Mossman Gorge area.
