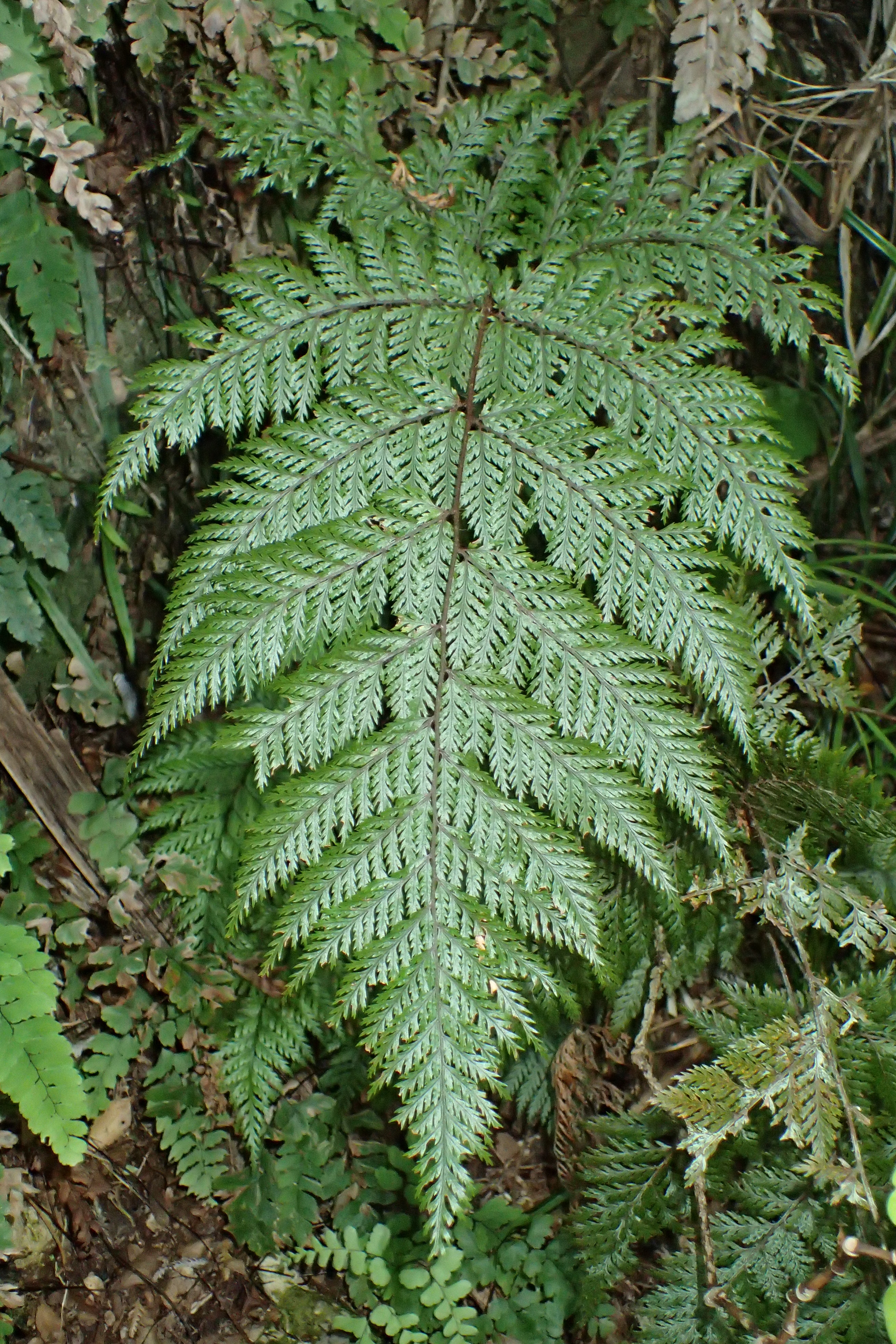

Scientific classification
- Kingdom: Plantae
- Clade: Tracheophytes
- Division: Polypodiophyta
- Class: Polypodiopsida
- Order: Polypodiales
- Suborder: Polypodiineae
- Family: Dryopteridaceae
- Genus: Lastreopsis
- Species: L. hispida

Binomial name
- Lastreopsis hispida (Sw.) Tindale

Synonyms
- Aspidium hispidum Sw.

= Lastreopsis hispida =

Bristly shield fern

Species of fern

Lastreopsis hispida, known as the bristly shield fern, is a common plant found in New Zealand. Less often seen in Australia, in cool rainforest areas with humus rich soils, or more rarely as an epiphyte on tree ferns or mossy logs. Listed as endangered in the state of New South Wales where it grows in a few remote sites in the Blue Mountains, such as at Mount Wilson. The specific epithet hispida is from Latin, meaning "bristly".
