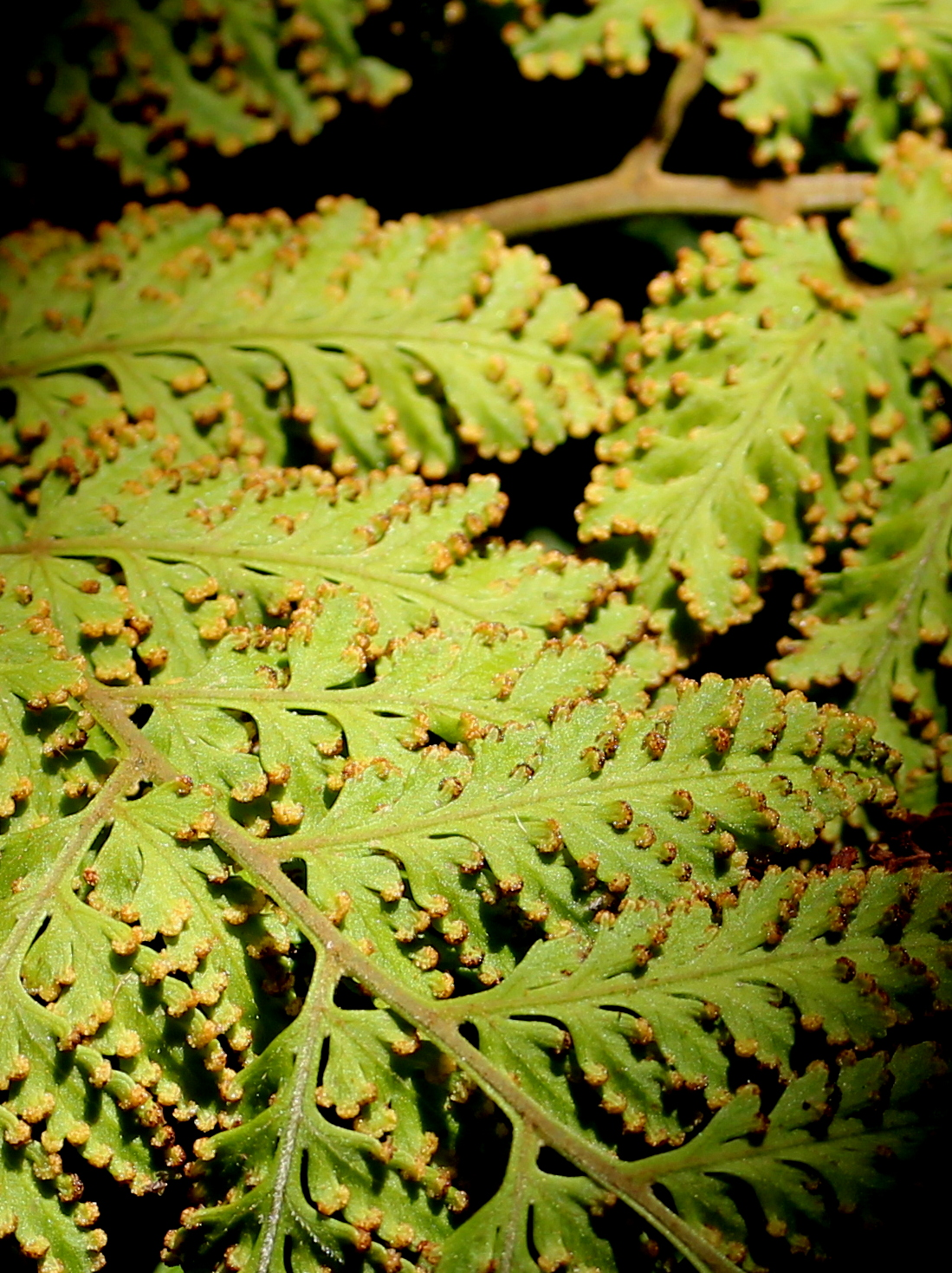

Scientific classification
- Kingdom: Plantae
- Clade: Tracheophytes
- Division: Polypodiophyta
- Class: Polypodiopsida
- Order: Polypodiales
- Suborder: Polypodiineae
- Family: Dryopteridaceae
- Genus: Parapolystichum
- Species: P. nephrodioides

Binomial name
- Parapolystichum nephrodioides (Baker) Perrie

Synonyms
- Deparia nephrodioides Baker; Lastropsis nephrodioides (Baker) Tindale

= Parapolystichum nephrodioides =

Species of plant

Parapolystichum nephrodioides is a fern in the family Dryopteridaceae. The specific epithet refers to its resemblance to Nephrodium decompositum R.Br. (= Lastreopsis decomposita (R.Br.) Tindale).

== Description ==
The plant is a terrestrial or epiphytic fern. Its fronds are up to 80 cm in length, comprising a 10–40 cm stipe and a lamina 15–40 cm long, 20–50 cm wide.

== Distribution and habitat ==
The fern is endemic to Australia’s subtropical Lord Howe Island in the Tasman Sea; it occurs in forest on the southern parts of the Island, especially at higher elevations.
