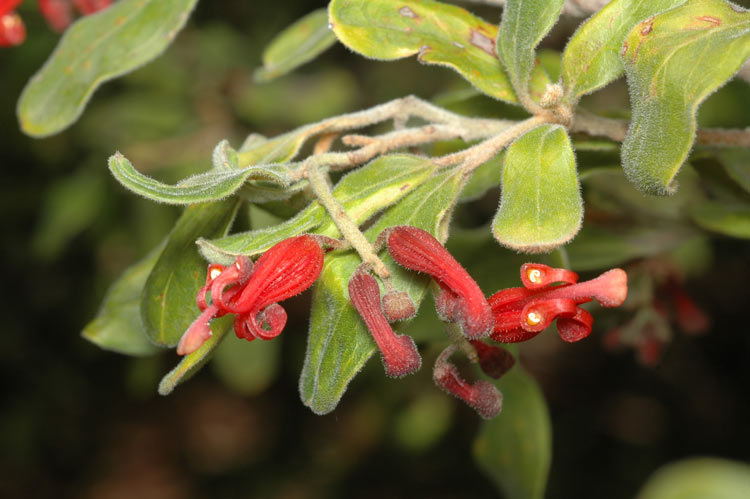
- In the Australian National Botanic Gardens

Conservation status
- Endangered (NCA)

Scientific classification
- Kingdom: Plantae
- Clade: Embryophytes
- Clade: Tracheophytes
- Clade: Angiosperms
- Clade: Eudicots
- Order: Proteales
- Family: Proteaceae
- Genus: Grevillea
- Species: G. linsmithii

Binomial name
- Grevillea linsmithii McGill.

= Grevillea linsmithii =

Species of shrub endemic to Australia

Grevillea linsmithii is a species of flowering plant in the family Proteaceae and is endemic to eastern Australia. It is a spreading shrub with oblong leaves, and small clusters of orange-pink to bright red flowers.

== Description ==
Grevillea linsmithii is a spreading shrub that typically grows to a height of 0.7–2 m (2 ft 4 in – 6 ft 7 in). Its leaves are oblong, mostly 40–90 mm (1.6–3.5 in) long and 4–10 mm (0.16–0.39 in) wide, the lower surface covered with shaggy hairs. The flowers are arranged on the ends of branches and hang downwards mostly in groups of two to four on a rachis usually 3–6 mm (0.12–0.24 in) long. The flowers are orange-pink to bright red with a greyish pink, gently curved style, the pistil 10–16 mm (0.39–0.63 in) long. Flowering occurs from March to November and the fruit is a elliptic follicle 17–18 mm (0.67–0.71 in) long.

== Taxonomy ==
Grevillea linsmithii was first formally described in 1986 by Donald McGillivray in his book, New Names in Grevillea (Proteaceae) from specimens collected from Mount Greville in 1973. The specific epithet, (linsmithii), honours Lindsay Stuart Smith.

== Distribution and habitat ==
This grevillea grows in scrub and forest in rocky places from south of Boonah in Queensland to the upper reaches of the Hastings and Forbes Rivers in north-eastern New South Wales.

== Conservation status ==
Grevillea linsmithii is listed as 'Endangered' in Queensland under the Queensland Government Nature Conservation Act 1992.
