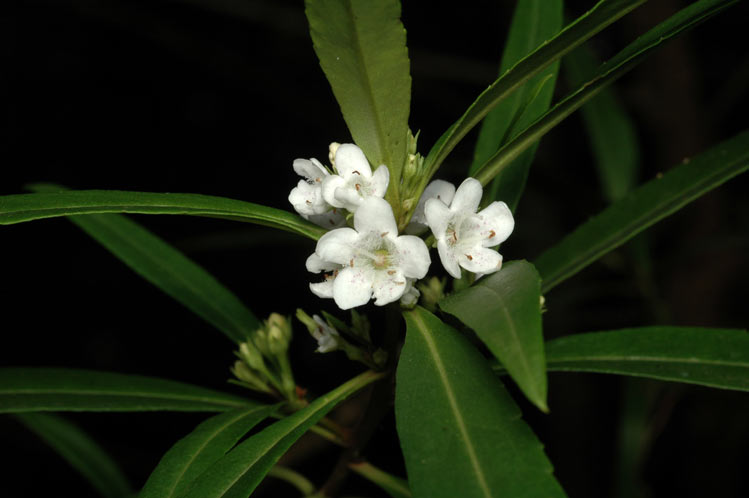

Scientific classification
- Kingdom: Plantae
- Clade: Tracheophytes
- Clade: Angiosperms
- Clade: Eudicots
- Clade: Asterids
- Order: Lamiales
- Family: Scrophulariaceae
- Genus: Myoporum
- Species: M. betcheanum

Binomial name
- Myoporum betcheanum L.S.Sm.

= Myoporum betcheanum =

Mountain boobialla

Species of shrub

Myoporum betcheanum, commonly known as mountain boobialla is a plant in the figwort family, Scrophulariaceae. It is a shrub or small tree with long, narrow leaves that are a darker green on their upper surface than the lower. Its flowers have five white petals and are arranged in small groups in the leaf axils. The fruits which follow are more or less spherical, soft, cream coloured drupes. As its common name suggests, this plant is restricted to higher places, around 1,000 metres (3,000 ft) above sea level. It occurs in the McPherson Range and nearby mountains of New South Wales and Queensland.

== Description ==
Myoporum betcheanum is a shrub or small tree growing to about 8 metres (30 ft) high. Its branches often have a few to many small, wart-like tubercles and are moderately to densely hairy. The leaves are 58–130 millimetres (2–5 in) long or longer, 6–19 millimetres (0.2–0.7 in) wide, flat, narrow elliptic in shape and with small teeth on the margins. They are darker on the upper surface, but both surfaces are covered with short, soft hairs.

The flowers are arranged in groups of 3 to 8 on a short stalk in the axils of the leaves and have 5 sepals and 5 white petals joined at their base to form a tube. The tube is 2.9–4.9 millimetres (0.1–0.2 in) long, the lobes are 2.8–3.7 millimetres (0.11–0.15 in) long and there are 4 stamens. Flowering occurs between December and May and is followed by fruits which are drupes with three compartments, each with one seed. The fruits are roughly oval to spherical in shape and are smooth, white or cream coloured tinged with pink.

== Taxonomy and naming ==
Myoporum betcheanum was first formally described in 1969 by Lindsay Stuart Smith in Contributions from the Queensland Herbarium from a specimen collected at Cunninghams Gap. The specific epithet (betcheanum) honours Ernst Betche who was the first to recognise this as a separate species.

== Distribution and habitat ==
Myoporum betcheanum occurs on the edges of rainforest and in wet forests at 850–1,100 metres (3,000–4,000 ft) above sea level in mountains of the Great Dividing Range north of Casino in New South Wales and in the McPherson Range and nearby mountains in Queensland.

== Use in horticulture ==
Myoporum betcheanum is an attractive species for the garden because although the flowers are small, they are profuse and appear over an extended period. It is readily propagated from cuttings.
