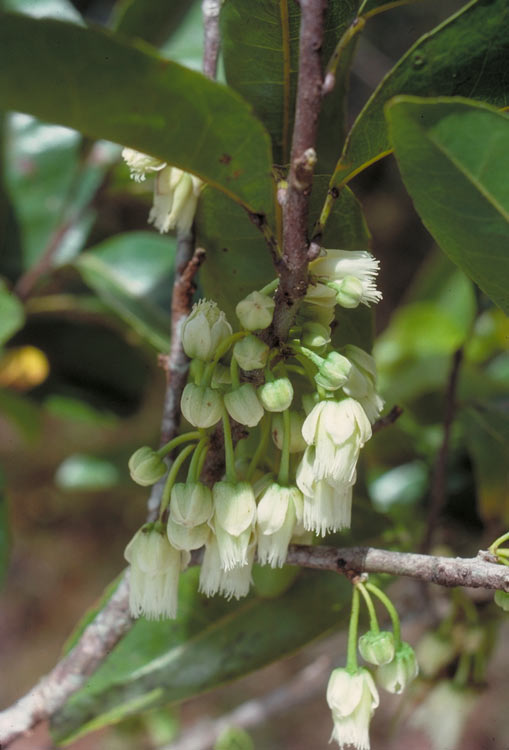
- Flowering specimen by B.Gray

Conservation status
- Vulnerable (NCA)

Scientific classification
- Kingdom: Plantae
- Clade: Tracheophytes
- Clade: Angiosperms
- Clade: Eudicots
- Clade: Rosids
- Order: Oxalidales
- Family: Elaeocarpaceae
- Genus: Peripentadenia
- Species: P. phelpsii

Binomial name
- Peripentadenia phelpsii B.Hyland & Coode
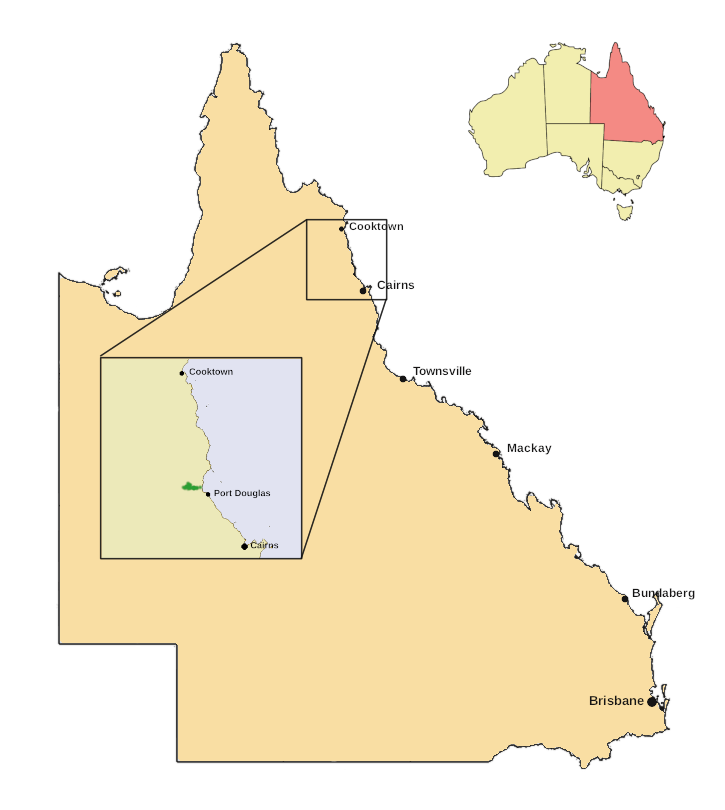

= Peripentadenia phelpsii =

Species of flowering plant

Peripentadenia phelpsii is a plant in the family Elaeocarpaceae which is endemic to a very small part of northeastern Queensland, Australia. It is a large evergreen tree with large buttresses, and was first described in 1982.

== Description ==
Peripentadenia phelpsii is a tree growing up to 35 m (115 ft) tall and 1.8 m (5 ft 11 in) diameter, with dramatic buttresses and a nondescript bark. The branches, twigs and leaves are all glabrous (hairless). The leaves are arranged alternately on the twigs and carried on petioles (stems) up to 15 cm (5.9 in) long; the leaf blades are oblong to elliptic and measure up to 13 cm (5.1 in) long by 5 cm (2.0 in) wide. They usually have 6 to 8 lateral veins either side of the midrib which form loops but are somewhat obscure. The leaf margins may be faintly toothed or smooth.

The inflorescence is a fascicle (or cluster) - they usually consists of 3 to 5 flowers, or occasionally only one, and are produced on the twigs below the leaves. The 5 sepals and petals are white; the sepals measure about 11 mm (0.43 in) long by 5 mm (0.20 in) wide, the petals are about 17 mm (0.67 in) long by 8 mm (0.31 in) wide and the distal margin has numerous long narrow lobes that give the flower a frilly appearance. There are 13 stamens opposite each petal and 2 more opposite each sepal.

The fruit is a green capsule, up to 45 mm (1.8 in) long by 35 mm (1.4 in) wide. It contains a single seed that is completely enclosed in a fleshy red aril. The seed measures about 25 mm (0.98 in) long by 16 mm (0.63 in) wide.

=== Phenology ===
Flowering occurs from August to September, fruit ripen around December to January.

== Taxonomy ==
Collections of plant material of this species were first made from 1975 onwards, from rainforest in the Mossman area. It was formally described in a 1982 paper by Bernard Hyland and Mark James Elgar Coode, titled "A second species for the Australian genus Peripentadenia (Eleaocarpaceae)," and published in the Kew Bulletin. The type specimen is a collection made in 1976 by Bruce Gray, a Queensland botanical collector and orchid specialist.

=== Etymology ===
The genus name Peripentadenia is constructed from the prefix "peri-" (from Ancient Greek περί) meaning about or around; "penta-" (from πέντε) meaning five; and "adeno-" (from ἀδήν) meaning gland. it is a reference to the insertion of the stamens around five "glands" in the flowers.

The species was named in honour of Roy Phelps, who first collected fruit of the plant and brought them to the attention of the authors.

== Distribution and habitat ==
The range of this tree is entirely restricted to the catchment area of the Mossman River, about 75 km (47 mi) north of Cairns, where it grows in mature rainforest at altitudes from 40 to 400 m (130 to 1,310 ft).

== Conservation ==
Peripentadenia phelpsii is listed by the Queensland Department of Environment and Science as vulnerable. As of 19 September 2023, it has not been assessed by the International Union for Conservation of Nature (IUCN).

== Gallery ==
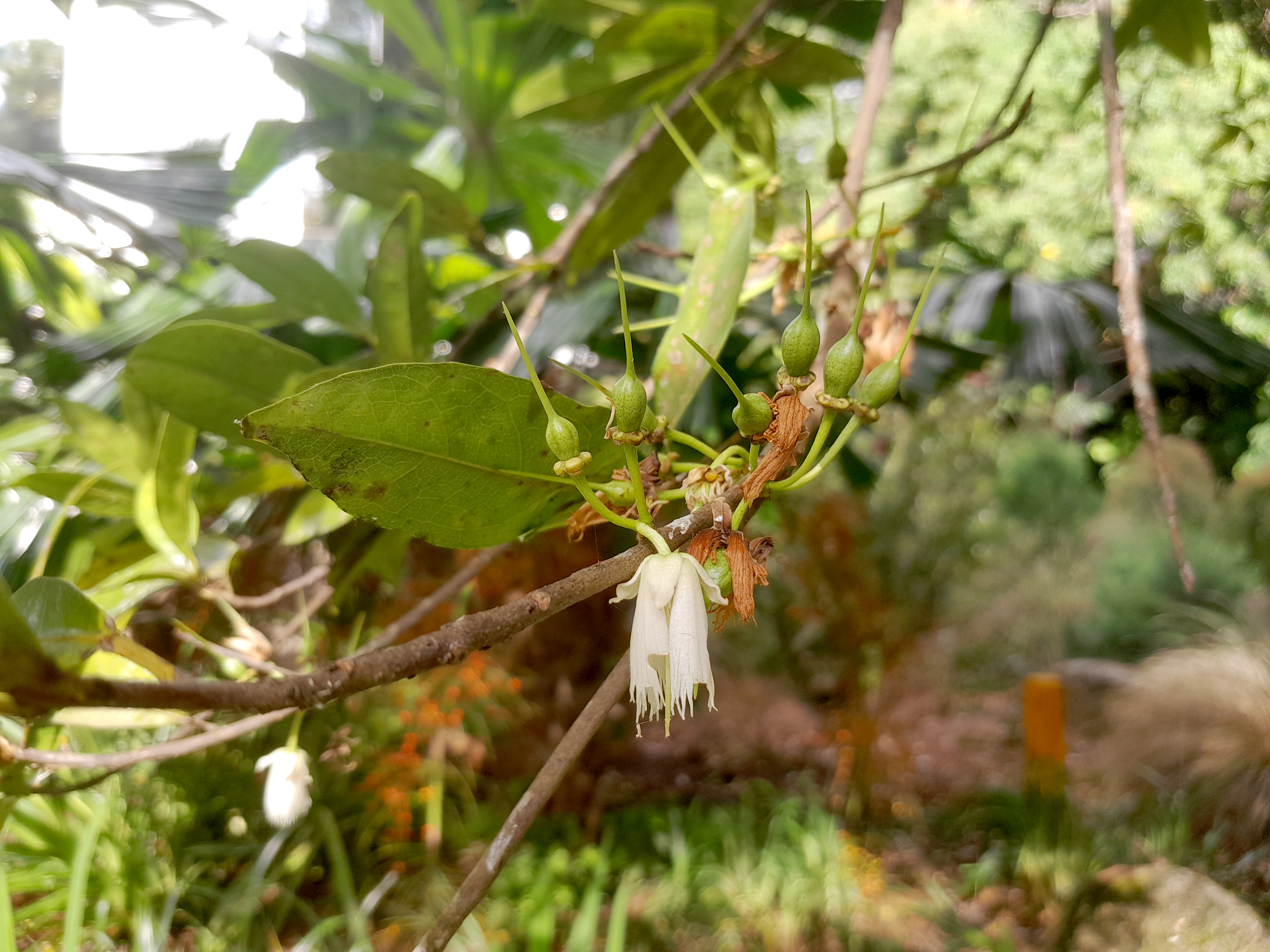
Flower and developing fruit

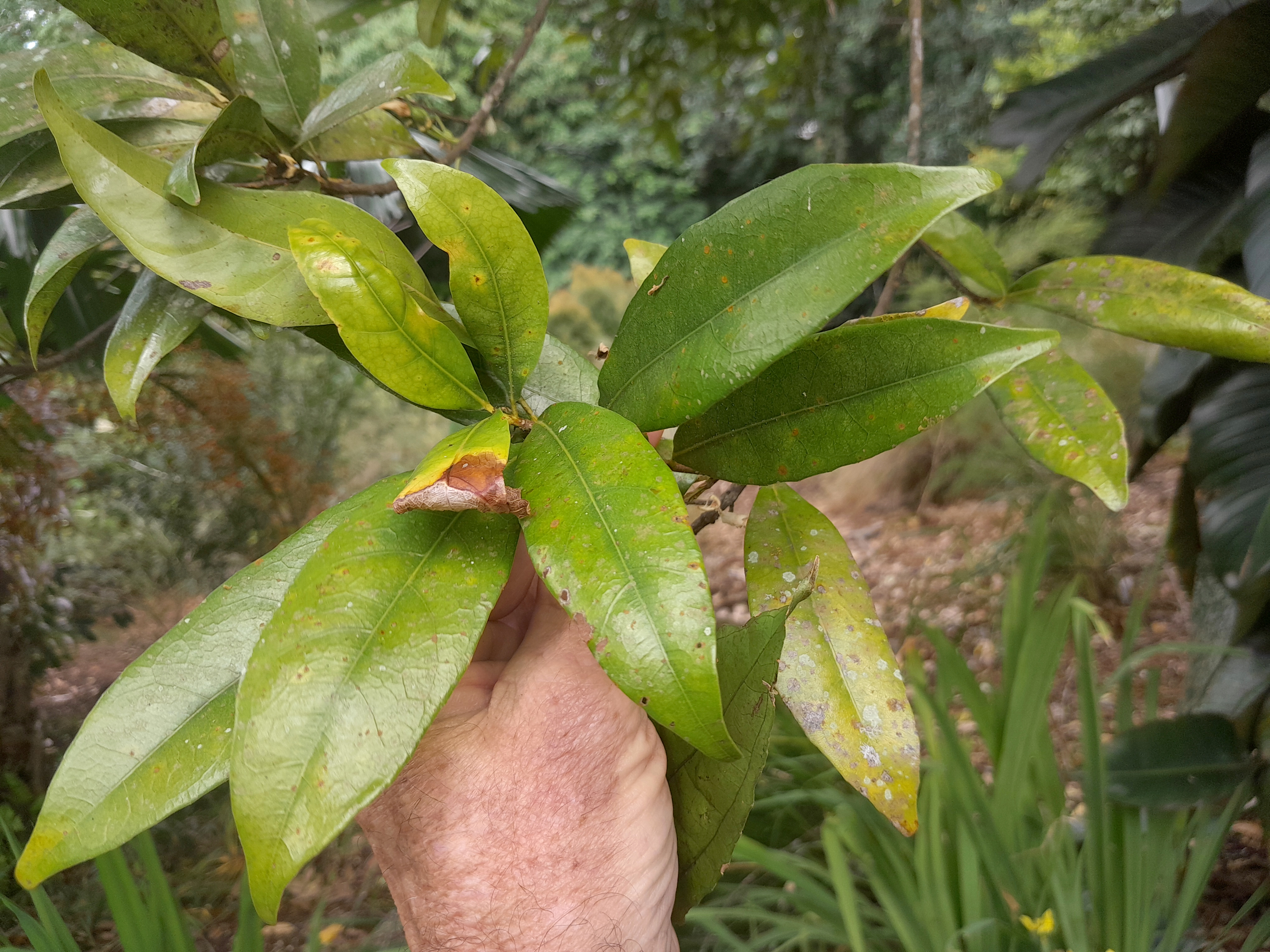
Foliage

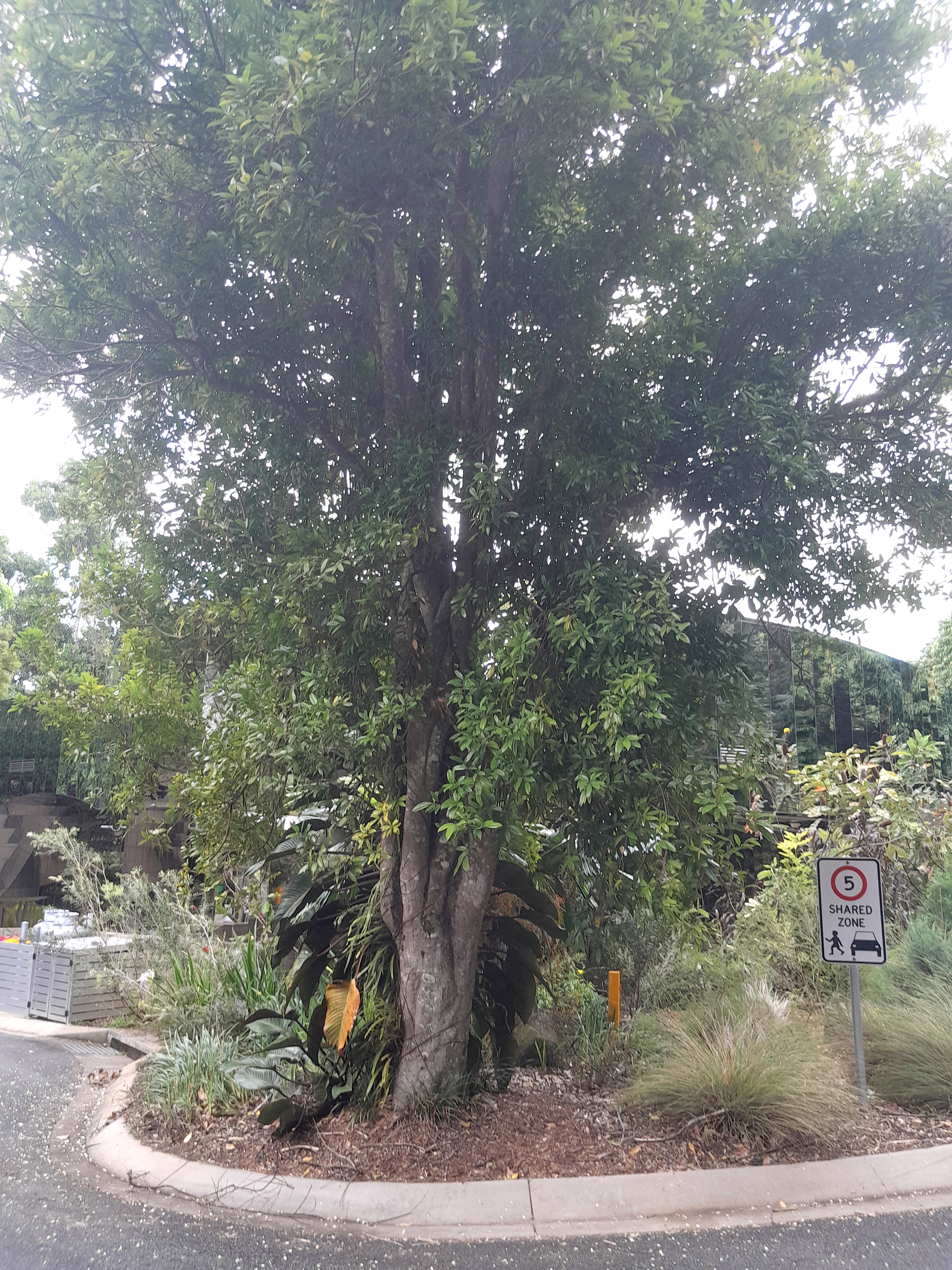
Habit

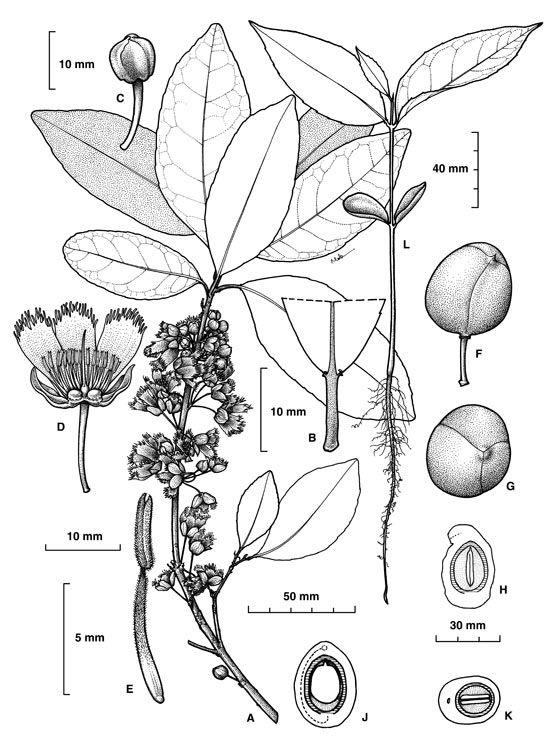
Botanical sketch

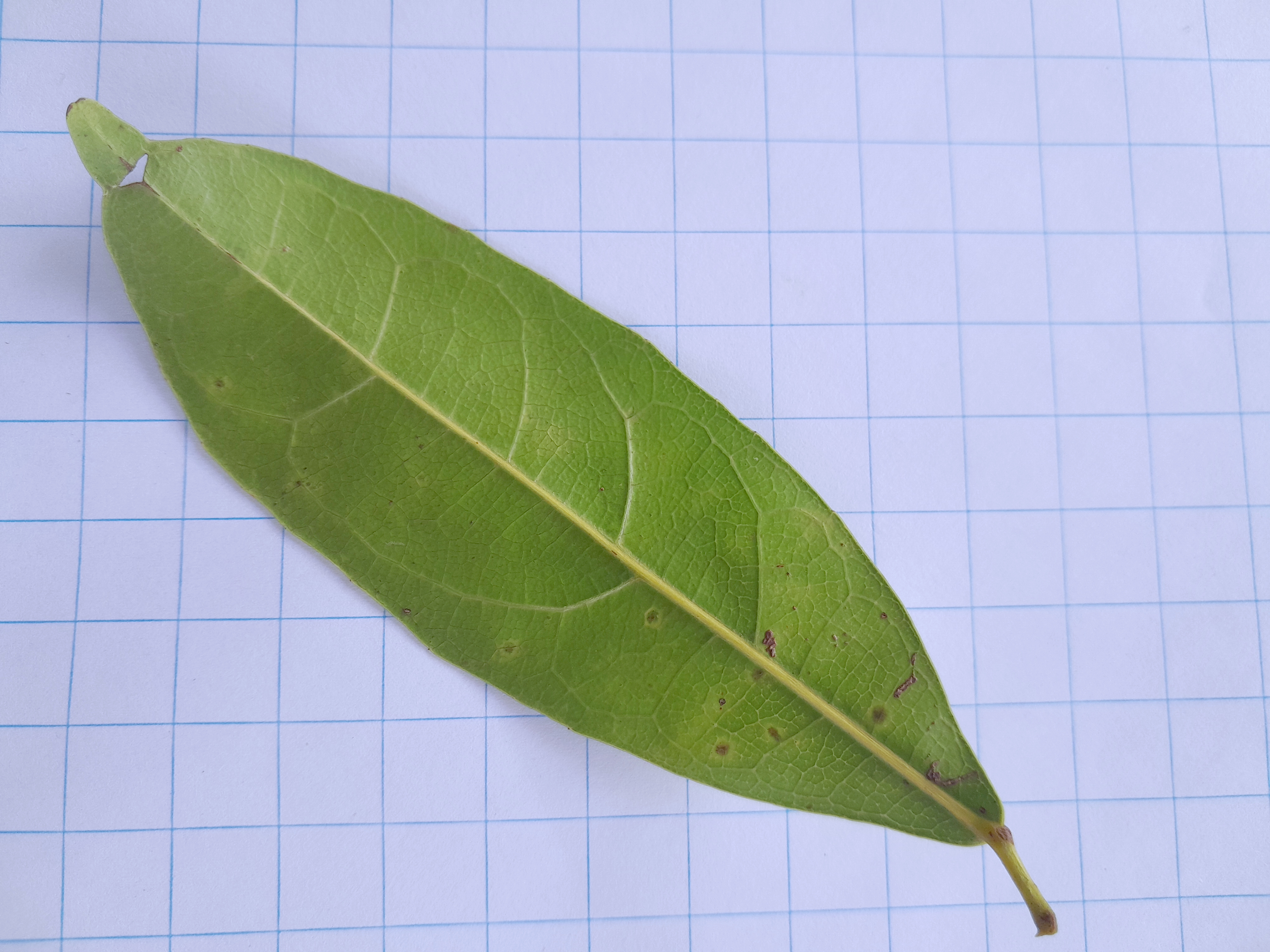
Underside of leaf

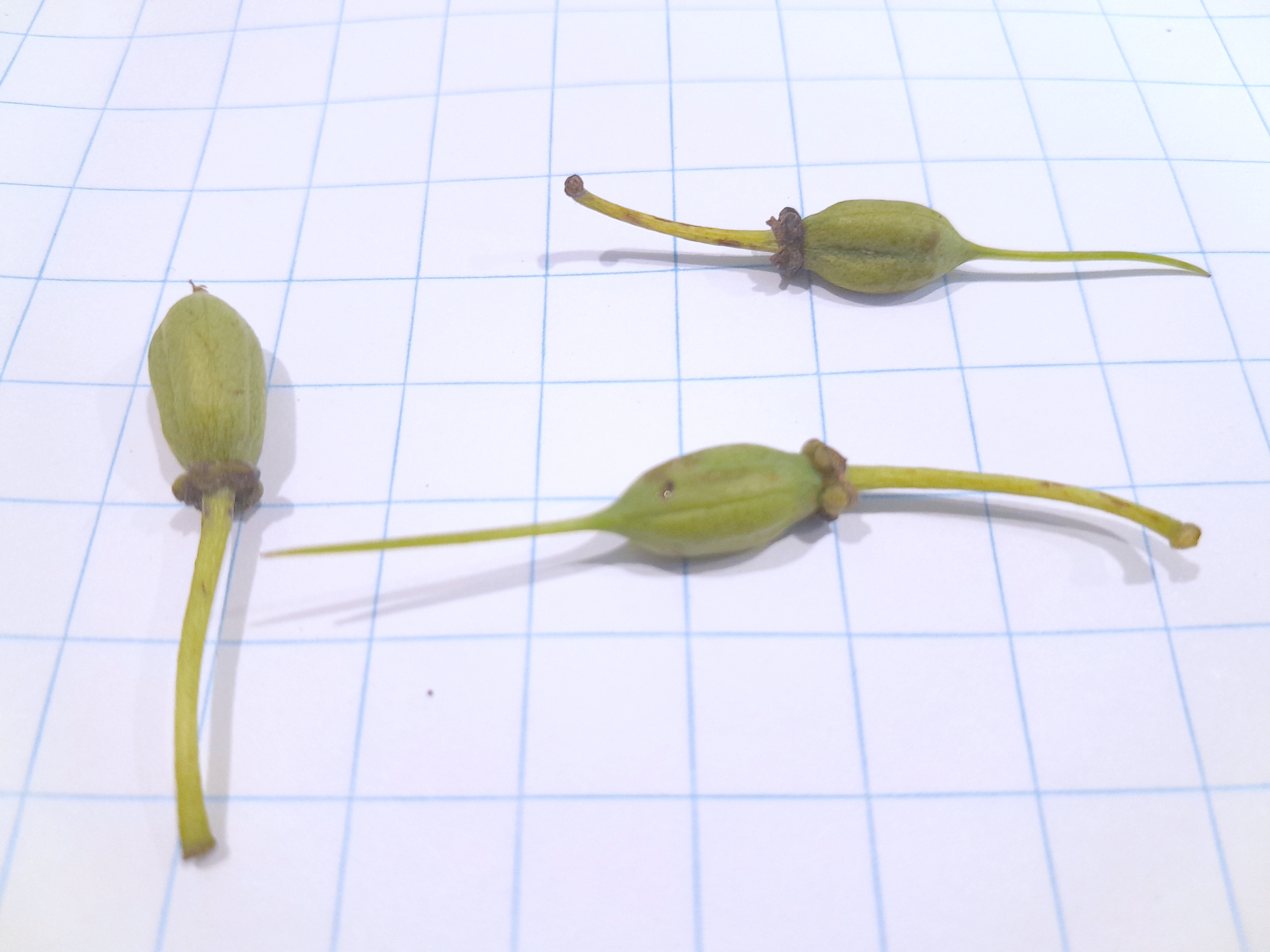
Aborted fruit
