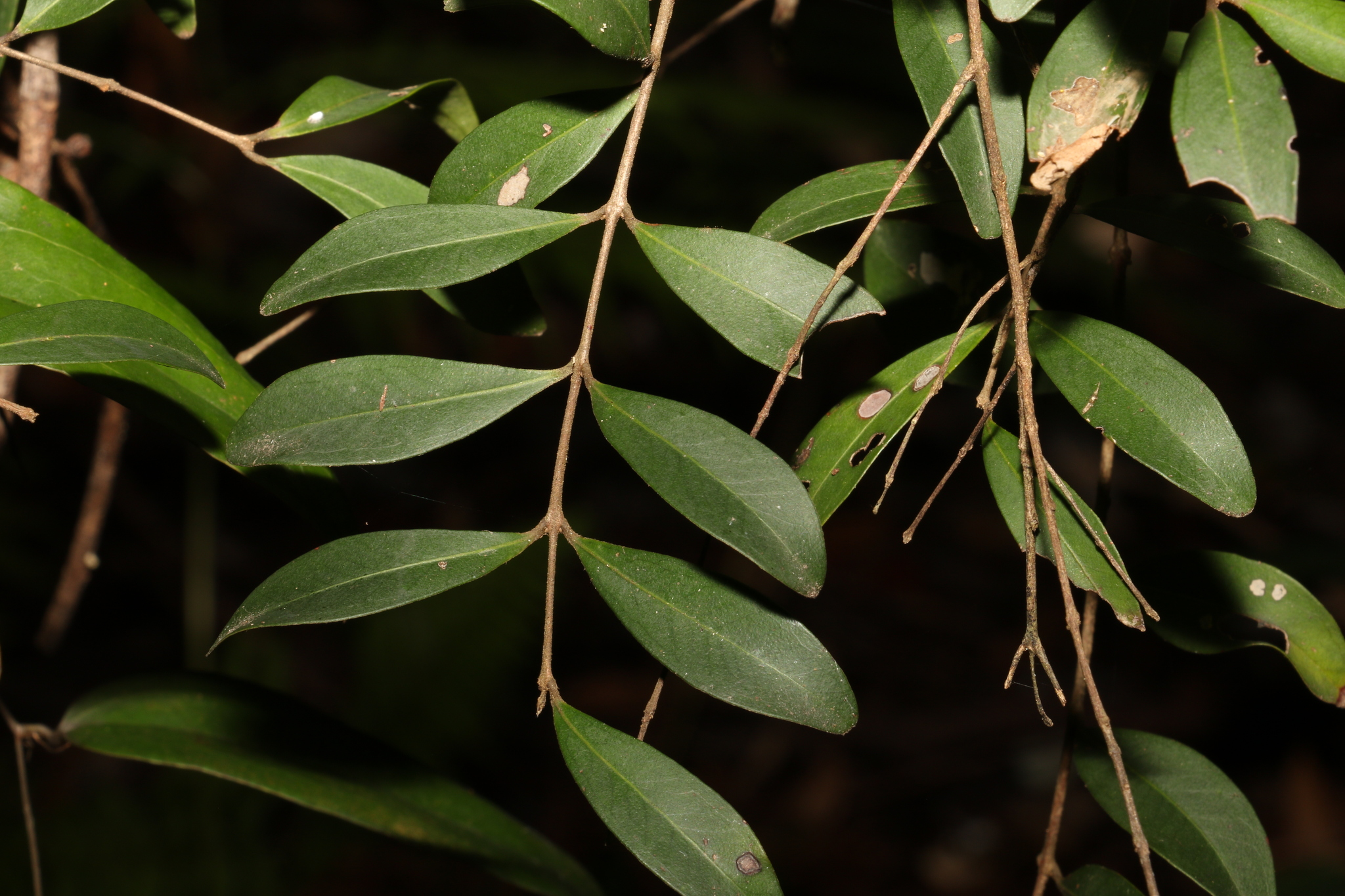

Conservation status
- Least Concern (NCA)

Scientific classification
- Kingdom: Plantae
- Clade: Embryophytes
- Clade: Tracheophytes
- Clade: Spermatophytes
- Clade: Angiosperms
- Clade: Eudicots
- Clade: Rosids
- Order: Myrtales
- Family: Myrtaceae
- Genus: Pilidiostigma
- Species: P. rhytispermum

Binomial name
- Pilidiostigma rhytispermum Burret

= Pilidiostigma rhytispermum =

Species of plant

Pilidiostigma rhytispermum is a species of flowering plant in the family Myrtaceae. It can be found in subtropical rainforest environments in Eastern Australia, from Lennox Head, New South Wales to Hervey Bay, Queensland, with most plants of the species being found in the Sunshine Coast Region.

== Conservation ==
It has been assessed as Least Concern under the Nature Conservation Act 1992.
