= Lastreopsis subrecedens =

Conservation status
- Critically Endangered (IUCN 3.1)

Scientific classification
- Kingdom: Plantae
- Clade: Tracheophytes
- Division: Polypodiophyta
- Class: Polypodiopsida
- Order: Polypodiales
- Suborder: Polypodiineae
- Family: Dryopteridaceae
- Genus: Lastreopsis
- Species: L. subrecedens

Binomial name
- Lastreopsis subrecedens Ching

Species of fern

Lastreopsis subrecedens is a species of fern in the family Dryopteridaceae. It is endemic to China. Its natural habitat is subtropical or tropical moist lowland forests. It is threatened by habitat loss.
