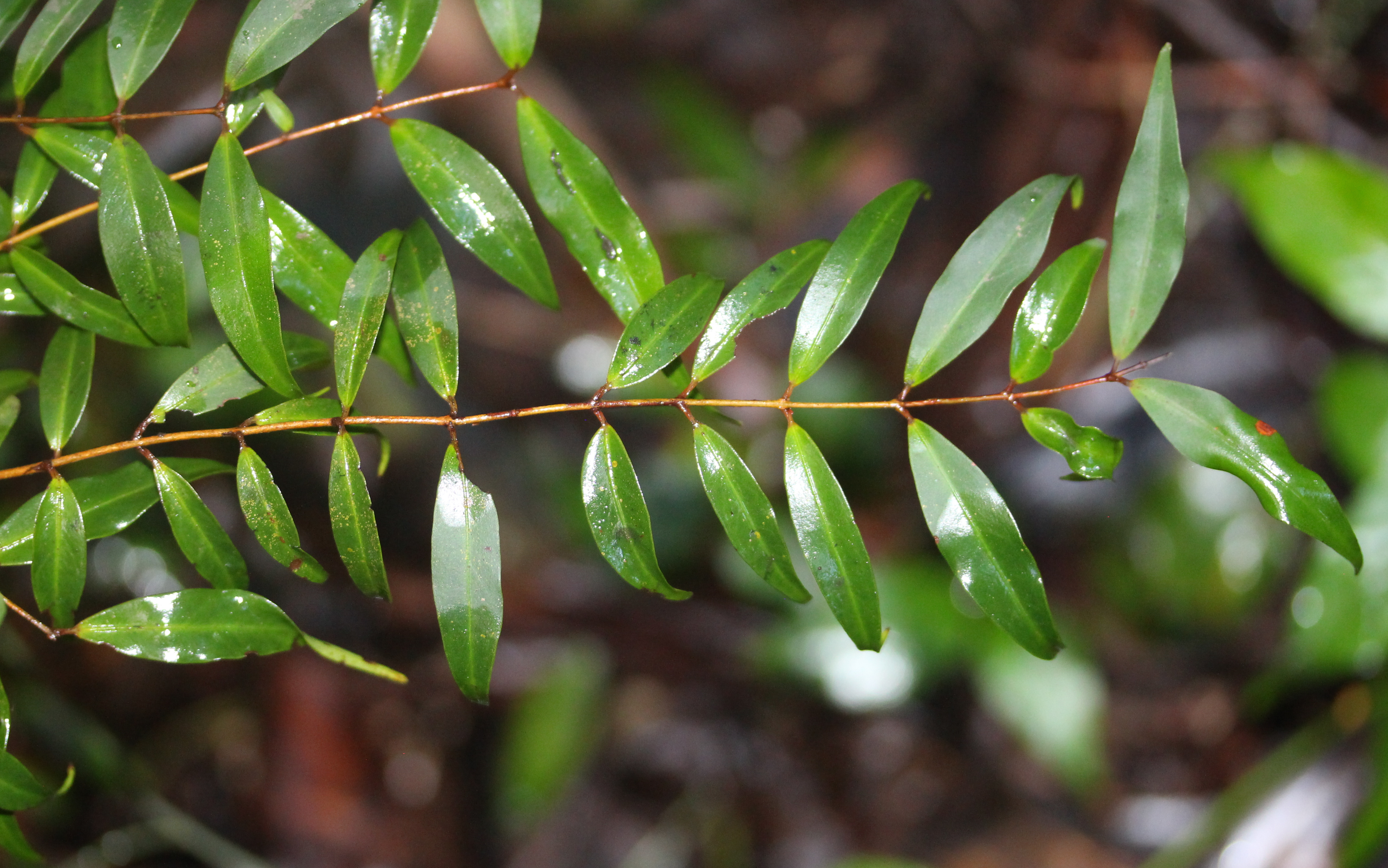
- Pilidiostigma glabrum in Ferndale Park, Sydney

Scientific classification
- Kingdom: Plantae
- Clade: Embryophytes
- Clade: Tracheophytes
- Clade: Spermatophytes
- Clade: Angiosperms
- Clade: Eudicots
- Clade: Rosids
- Order: Myrtales
- Family: Myrtaceae
- Subfamily: Myrtoideae
- Tribe: Myrteae
- Genus: Pilidiostigma; Burret

Type species
- Pilidiostigma glabrum Burret

Species
- See text

= Pilidiostigma =

Genus of flowering plants in the myrtle family

Pilidiostigma is a genus of plants in the myrtle family Myrtaceae. All species occur in eastern Australia and one, P. papuanum, also occurs in Papua New Guinea.

== Description ==
Species in Pilidiostigma range from 1 m (3 ft 3 in) shrubs to trees reaching 18 m (59 ft). The bark varies between the species. Leaves are arranged in opposite pairs, stipules are much reduced. Inflorescences may be terminal or axillary, and a raceme or a panicle. Flowers are bisexual and have four or five petals and sepals. The fruits are berries.

== Species ==
As of June 2026, Plants of the World Online accepts the following six species:

- Pilidiostigma glabrum Burret – New South Wales (NSW) to Queensland (Qld)
- Pilidiostigma papuanum (Lauterb.) A.J.Scott – Qld to New Guinea
- Pilidiostigma rhytispermum (F.Muell.) Burret – NSW to Qld
- Pilidiostigma sessile N.Snow – Qld
- Pilidiostigma tetramerum L.S.Sm. – Qld
- Pilidiostigma tropicum L.S.Sm. – Qld
