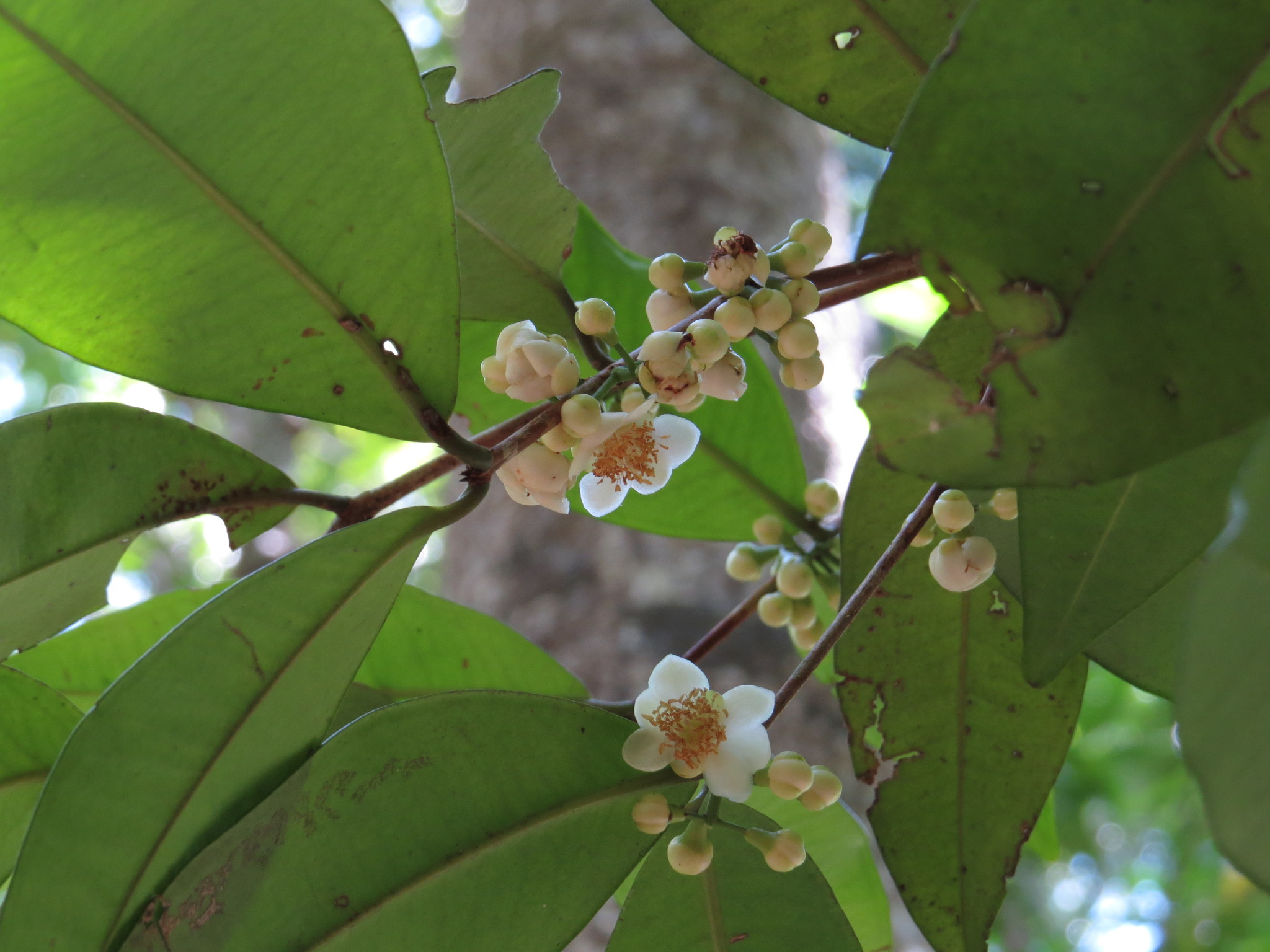
- Flowers and fruit

Conservation status
- Least Concern (NCA)

Scientific classification
- Kingdom: Plantae
- Clade: Embryophytes
- Clade: Tracheophytes
- Clade: Spermatophytes
- Clade: Angiosperms
- Clade: Eudicots
- Clade: Rosids
- Order: Myrtales
- Family: Myrtaceae
- Genus: Pilidiostigma
- Species: P. papuanum

Binomial name
- Pilidiostigma papuanum A.J.Scott

= Pilidiostigma papuanum =

Species of plant

Pilidiostigma papuanum is a species of flowering plant in the family Myrtaceae. It can be found in North Queensland and Papua New Guinea.

== Conservation ==
It has been assessed as Least Concern under the Nature Conservation Act 1992.
