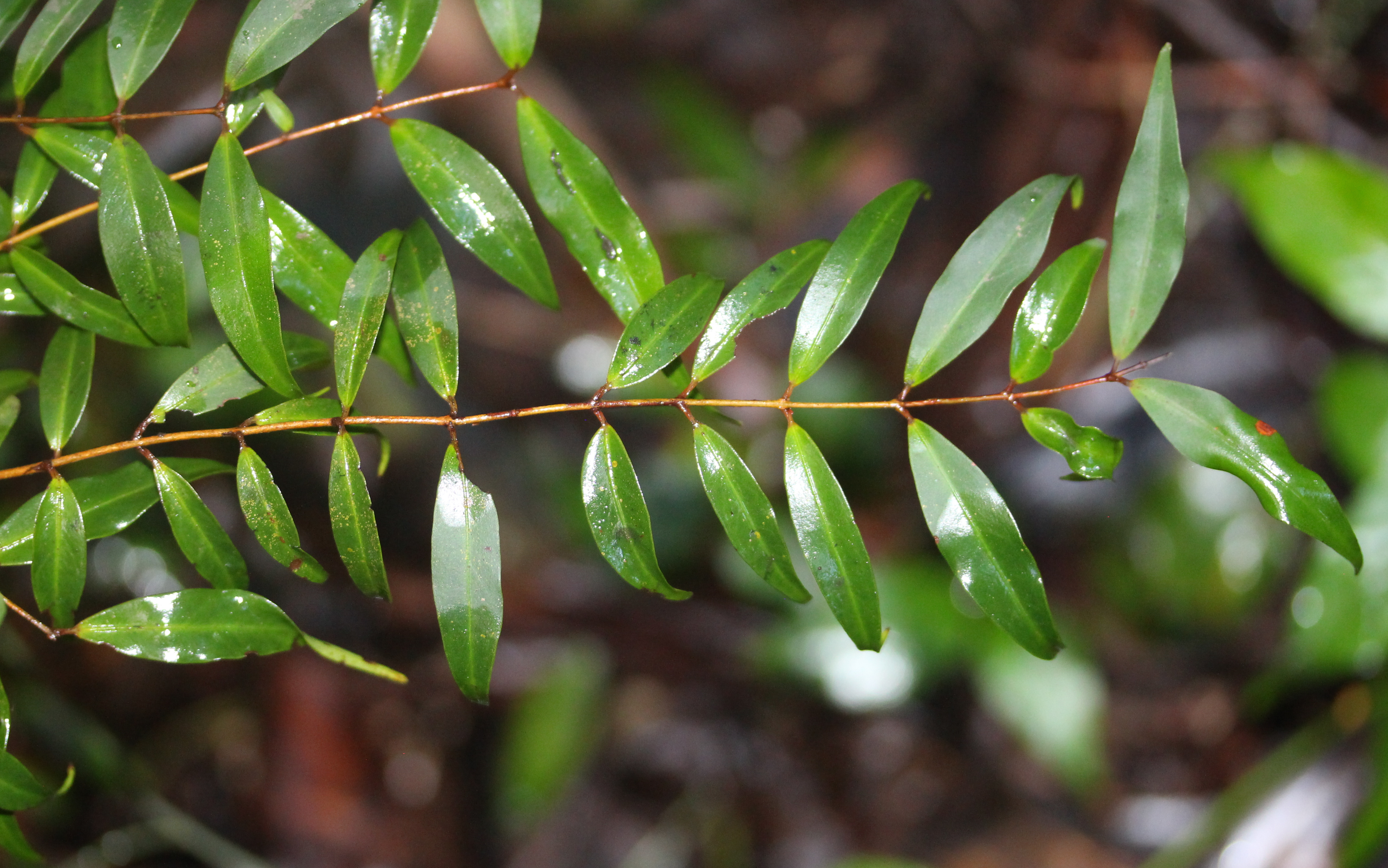
- narrow leaf form

Scientific classification
- Kingdom: Plantae
- Clade: Embryophytes
- Clade: Tracheophytes
- Clade: Spermatophytes
- Clade: Angiosperms
- Clade: Eudicots
- Clade: Rosids
- Order: Myrtales
- Family: Myrtaceae
- Genus: Pilidiostigma
- Species: P. glabrum

Binomial name
- Pilidiostigma glabrum Burret

Synonyms
- Myrtus rhytisperma var. grandiflora Benth.

= Pilidiostigma glabrum =

Plum myrtle

Species of shrub

Pilidiostigma glabrum, the plum myrtle, is a small tree or shrub native to the rainforests of eastern Australia. Commonly seen in disturbed sites from near Port Macquarie in the south to Fraser Island in the north.

== Description ==
Leaves and floral parts are hairless. Leaves opposite on the stem, 2 to 10 cm long, 1 to 3 cm wide, oil glands, very small. A narrow leaf form is found near Crystal Creek, in northern New South Wales. Small branches coloured purple/brown.

White or pink flowers grow relatively large, 2 cm across, appearing from April to November. Fruit are a purplish black pear shaped berry, up to 13 mm in diameter, with four to eight kidney shaped seeds. Seeds germinate easily from 7 to 28 days. Cuttings are slow to strike roots.
