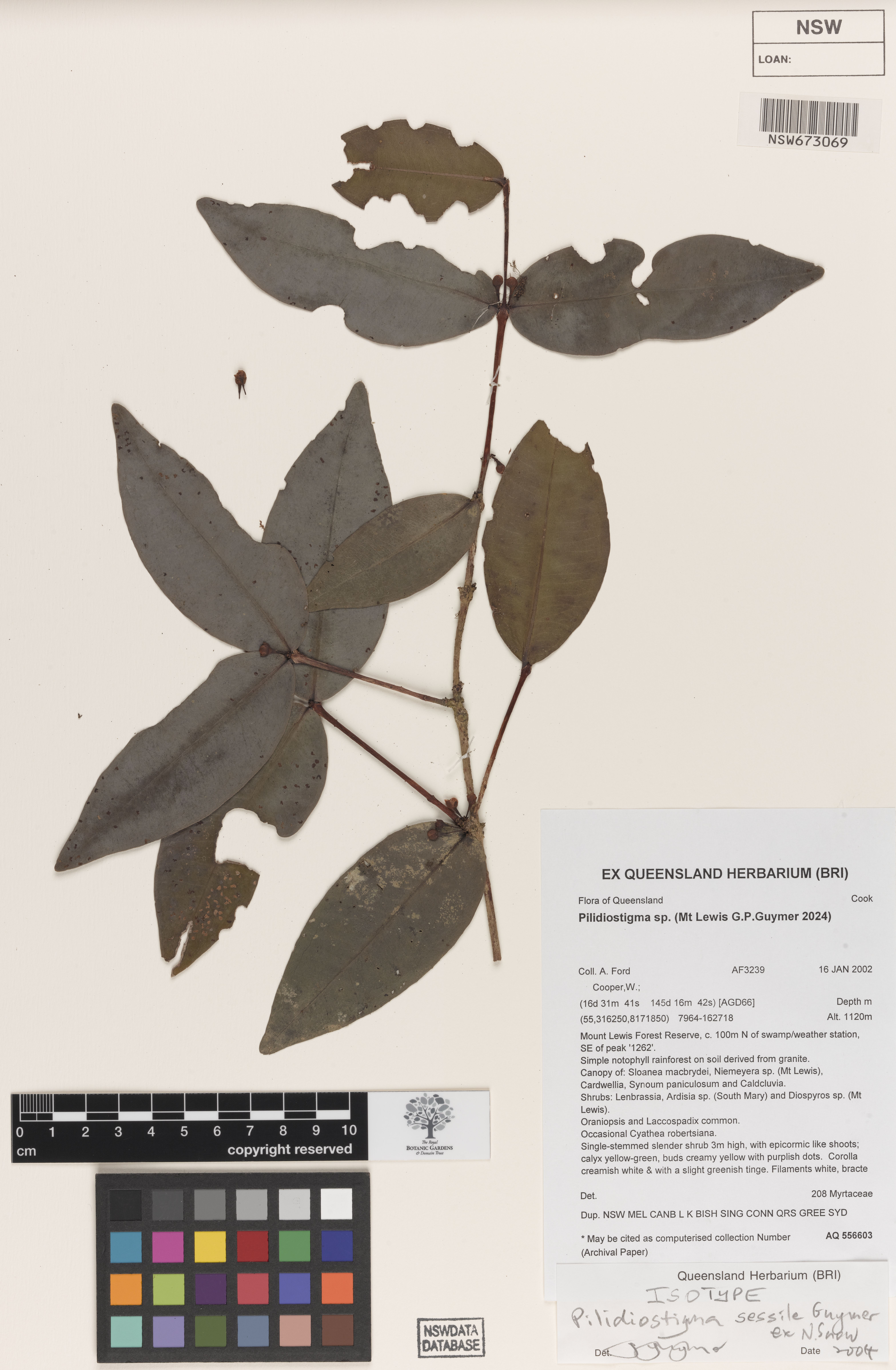
- Isotype

Conservation status
- Least Concern (NCA)

Scientific classification
- Kingdom: Plantae
- Clade: Embryophytes
- Clade: Tracheophytes
- Clade: Spermatophytes
- Clade: Angiosperms
- Clade: Eudicots
- Clade: Rosids
- Order: Myrtales
- Family: Myrtaceae
- Genus: Pilidiostigma
- Species: P. sessile

Binomial name
- Pilidiostigma sessile N.Snow

= Pilidiostigma sessile =

Species of flowering plant

Pilidiostigma sessile is a species of plant in the clove and eucalyptus family Myrtaceae which is endemic to the Wet Tropics bioregion of Queensland, Australia.

== Description ==
It is a much-branched shrub growing to about 5 m (16 ft) tall, with pale grey bark on the main stem. The leaves are dull green and measure up to 15 cm (6 in) long and 5 cm (2 in) wide. They are attached to the twigs either directly (sessile) or on a very short petiole about 1.5 mm (0.06 in) long. They have conspicuous lateral veins and two intramarginal veins.

Flowers are small and occur either singly or on a short raceme about 15 mm (0.6 in) long. They have four petals and sepals, up to 4 mm (0.16 in) and 5 mm (0.20 in) long respectively. The petals are pink to purple. There are about 40 stamens and a single style (botany).

The fruit is about 12 mm (0.5 in) long and 6 mm (0.2 in) wide, and contains a single seed.

== Taxonomy ==
Specimens of this species have been collected since 1972, but it was not until 2004 that botanist Neil Snow formally described and named it.

== Distribution and habitat ==
It is restricted to the Mount Lewis and Atherton Tableland areas, at altitudes from 1,100 to 1,300 m (3,600 to 4,300 ft). It grows in rainforest and has a preference for granite substrates.

== Conservation status ==
The species is listed as least concern under the Queensland Government's Nature Conservation Act. As of 29 June 2026, it has not been assessed by the International Union for Conservation of Nature.
