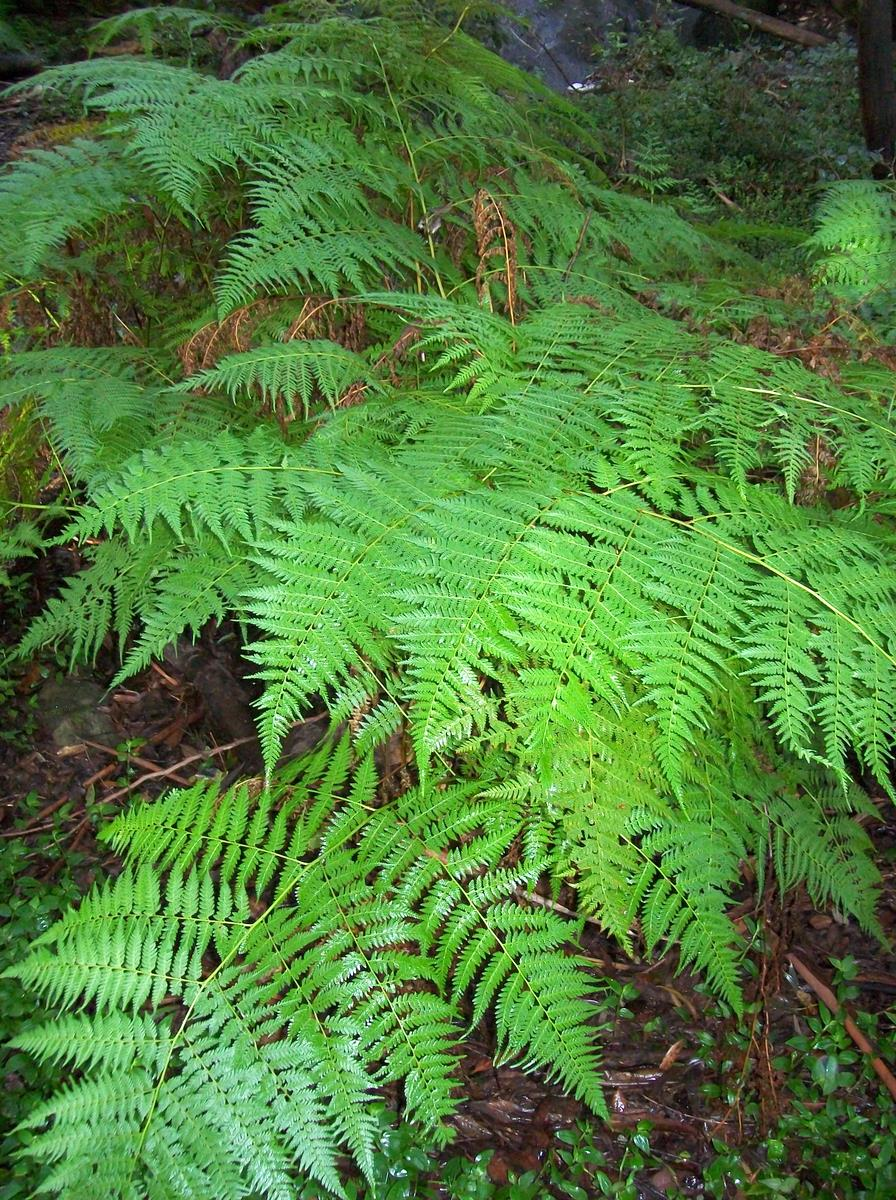
- Chatswood West, Australia

Scientific classification
- Kingdom: Plantae
- Clade: Tracheophytes
- Division: Polypodiophyta
- Class: Polypodiopsida
- Order: Polypodiales
- Suborder: Polypodiineae
- Family: Dryopteridaceae
- Genus: Lastreopsis
- Species: L. decomposita

Binomial name
- Lastreopsis decomposita R.Br. Tindale

Synonyms
- Nephrodium decompositum R.Br.

= Lastreopsis decomposita =

Species of fern

Lastreopsis decomposita, known as the trim shield fern, is a common plant found in eastern Australia. The habitat is rainforest or moist sheltered eucalyptus forests. It may form large colonies. This fern features delicate lacy fronds, up to 90 cm long. The segments are alternate on the stem, hairy and thin textured.

The specific epithet decomposita is from Latin, it refers to the segments being compounded more than once.

This species first appeared in the scientific literature as in 1810 as Nephrodium decompositum, in the Prodromus Florae Novae Hollandiae. Authored by the prolific Scottish botanist, Robert Brown.
