= Doris Alma Goy =

Australian botanical collector (1912–1999)

- Born: 1912; Mount Morgan, Queensland, Australia
- Died: 9 October 1999 (aged 86–87); Chermside, Queensland, Australia
- Other names: Doris Alma Smith (married name)
- Spouse: Lindsay Stuart Smith
- Scientific career
- Author abbrev. (botany): Goy; D.A.Sm.

Doris Alma Goy (1912 – 9 October 1999) was an Australian botanist and botanical collector. She is best known for her work on ferns.

== Early life and education ==
Goy was born in 1912 at Mount Morgan, Queensland, daughter of Mary (née Petersen) and engine driver Joseph Goy. She passed the high school examination in 1924 and enrolled in Mount Morgan State High School, where she passed the junior public examination in 1927. She was seventh on the order of merit for professional and clerical positions and was offered employment as a student teacher.

== Career ==
She moved to Brisbane and found work in the Queensland Department of Agriculture and Stock. A few years later she transferred to the Queensland Herbarium and began collecting and studying ferns. Her articles about Queensland ferns were published in the Queensland Naturalist, North Queensland Naturalist and the Victorian Naturalist. Some were co-authored with Cyril Tenison White, the Government Botanist.

The Public Service marriage bar forced her retirement, following her marriage to fellow botanist Lindsay Stuart Smith in 1942. During her life, Goy collected more than 1,300 specimens, including many ferns, 1,090 of which are held in the Queensland Herbarium.

Following her husband's death in 1970, Goy prepared his notes on the biological control of Lantana which were published in the Botany Bulletin.

For some years Goy lived at John Wesley Gardens in Geebung, Queensland. She later moved to the J. W. Jones Nursing Centre in Chermside. Goy died on 9 October 1999 in Chermside, Queensland.

As Goy used both her maiden and married names when collecting, she has two author names:

- The standard author abbreviation Goy is used to indicate this person as the author when citing a botanical name.
- The standard author abbreviation D.A.Sm. is used to indicate this person as the author when citing a botanical name.
