= Lindsay Stuart Smith =

Australian botanist (1917–1970)

- Born: 27 November 1917; Bundaberg, Queensland, Australia
- Died: 12 September 1970 (aged 52); Mount Barney, Queensland, Australia
- Education: University of Queensland
- Scientific career
- Fields: Botany
- Workplaces: Queensland Department of Agriculture and Stock

Lindsay Stuart Smith (27 November 1917 – 12 September 1970) was an Australian botanist, naturalist and public servant.

== Early years ==
Lindsay Smith was born in Bundaberg, Queensland, and attended Bundaberg South State School and later Bundaberg State High School. In 1933 he began work as a clerk in the Queensland Department of Agriculture and Stock. Except for war service with the Second Australian Imperial Force in World War II, he remained in that department, rising through the ranks to the position of Senior Botanist. After the war, he studied science in the evenings and in 1948 was awarded the degree of First Class Honours in Botany.

== Career ==
During World War II, Smith made collections of rainforest species in New Guinea and subsequently studied these species with the help of Cyril Tenison White and William Douglas Francis and some of his collections become the nucleus of the herbarium at Lae. He made extensive studies of the genus Lantana, a group of invasive species in Australia, collecting many specimens in Australia and overseas. His notes on the biological control of Lantana were published after his death by his wife, Doris Alma Goy. The family Myoporaceae (now Scrophulariaceae) was a particular interest as were the mangroves.

Smith was an active field naturalist, a member, occasional President and Honorary Treasurer of the Queensland Naturalists' Club and his biographer, Selwyn Everist noted that he will be "remember[ed] [for] his vast knowledge of plants and his patient courtesy in answering the many questions put to him by fellow naturalists at meetings and excursions".

The species named by Smith include Austromyrtus dulcis, Elaeocarpus stellaris, Myoporum betcheanum, and Xanthostemon verticillatus, and the genera Peripentadenia, Neorites and Neostrearia. The species named in his honour are Eremophila linsmithii R.J.F.Hend., Elaeocarpus linsmithii Guymer and Grevillea linsmithii McGill.

Smith suffered a heart attack and died at the age of 52, doing his work collecting plants at Mount Barney with his wife.
