= Ord River Floodplain =

Floodplain in Australia

Designations

Ramsar Wetland
- Official name: Ord River Floodplain
- Designated: 7 June 1990
- Reference no.: 477

The Ord River floodplain is the floodplain of the lower Ord River in the Shire of Wyndham-East Kimberley, in the Kimberley region of northern Western Australia. It lies within the Victoria Bonaparte IBRA bioregion and contains river, seasonal creek, tidal mudflat and floodplain wetlands, with extensive stands of mangroves, that support saltwater crocodiles and many waterbirds. It is recognised as an internationally important wetland area, with 1,384 square kilometres (534 sq mi) of it designated on 7 June 1990 as Ramsar Site 477 under the Ramsar Convention on Wetlands.

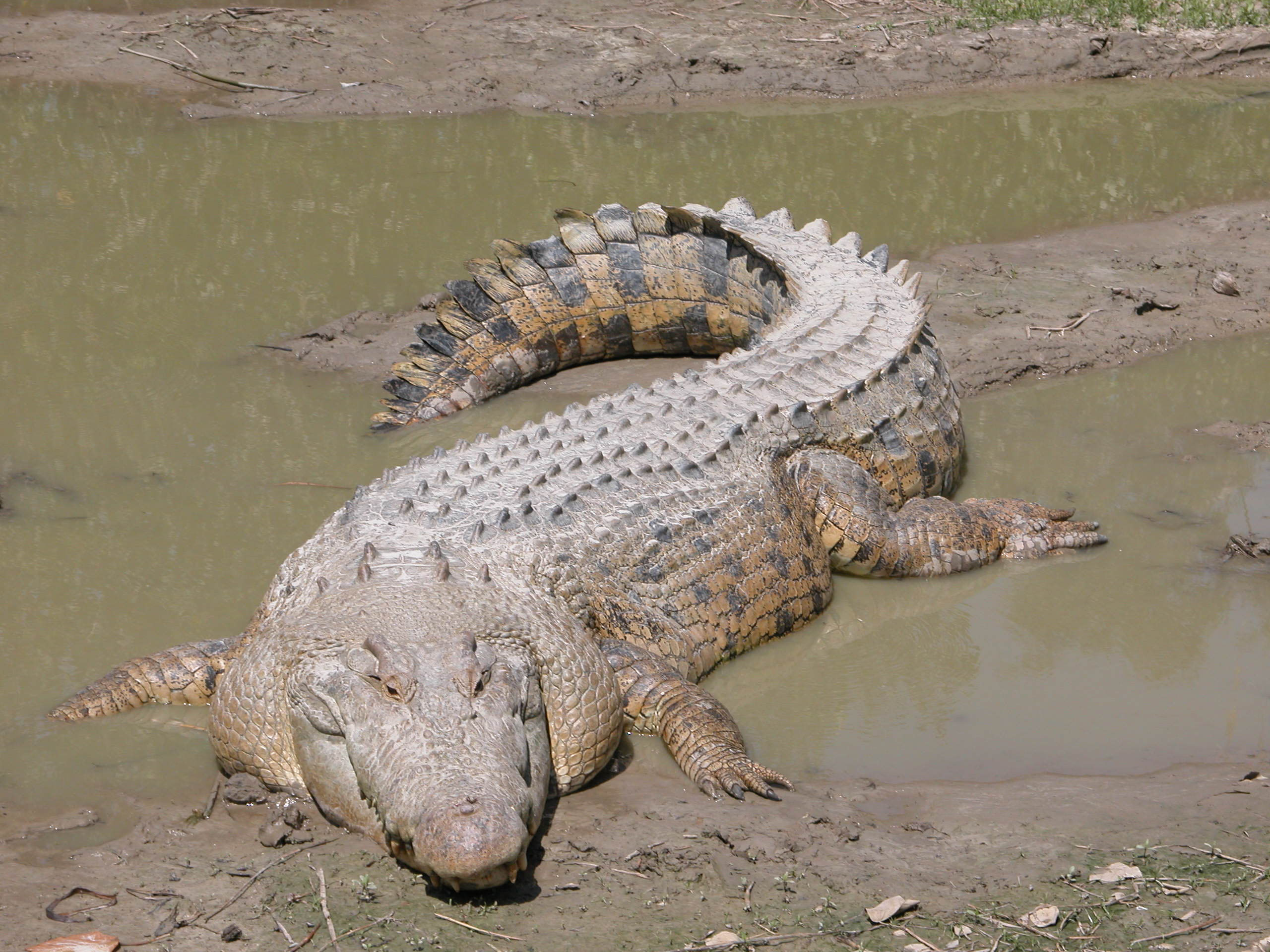
Saltwater crocodile

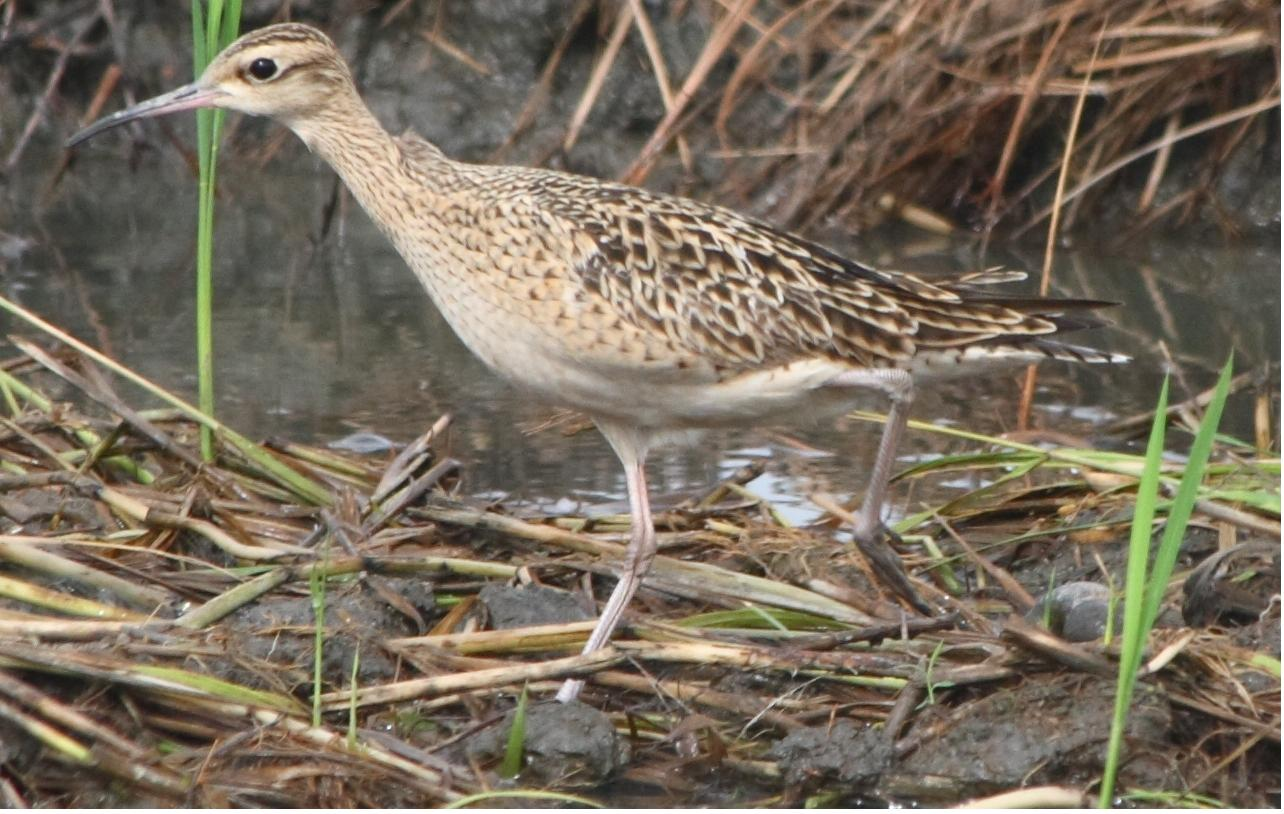
Little curlew

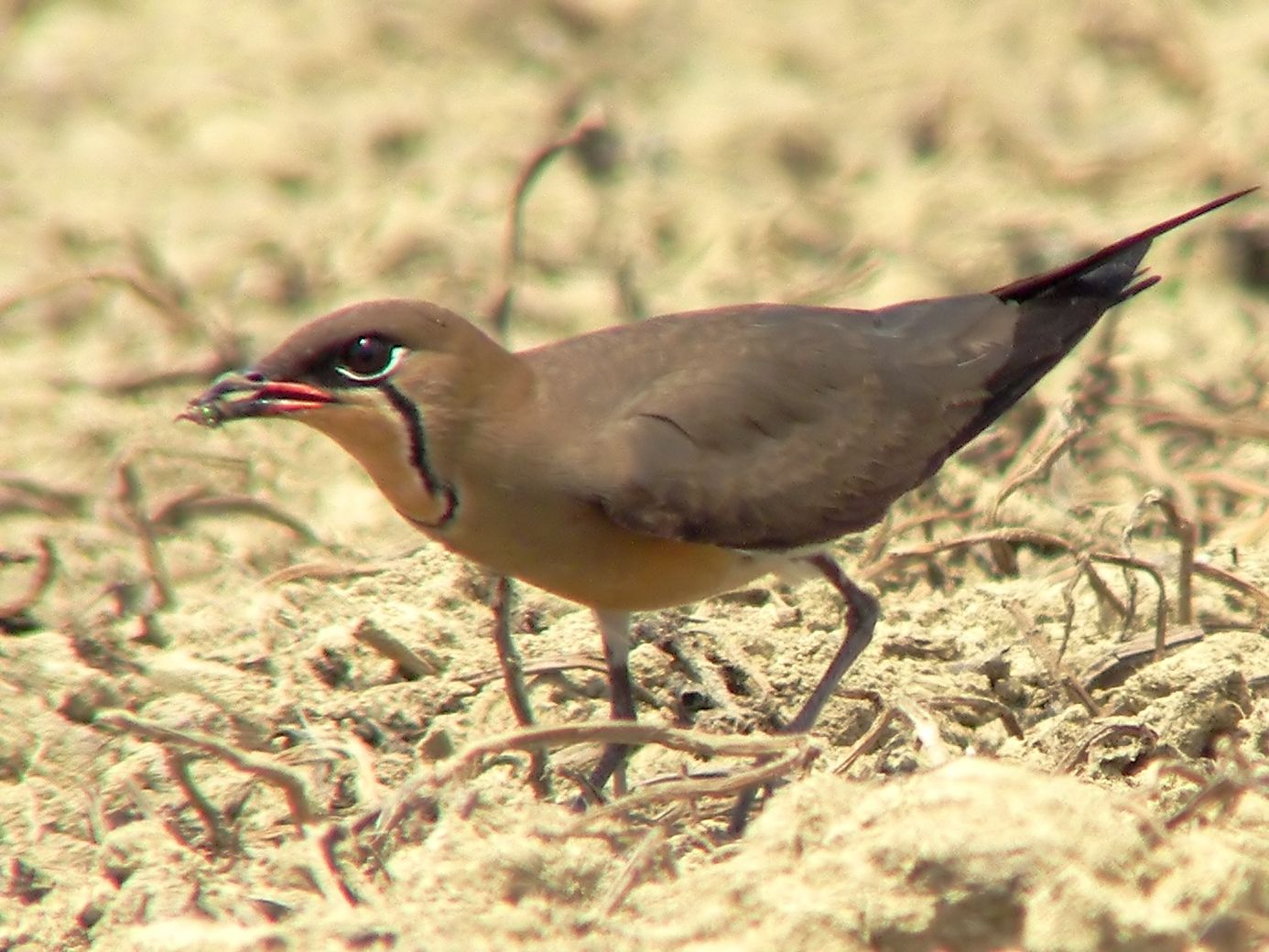
Oriental pratincole

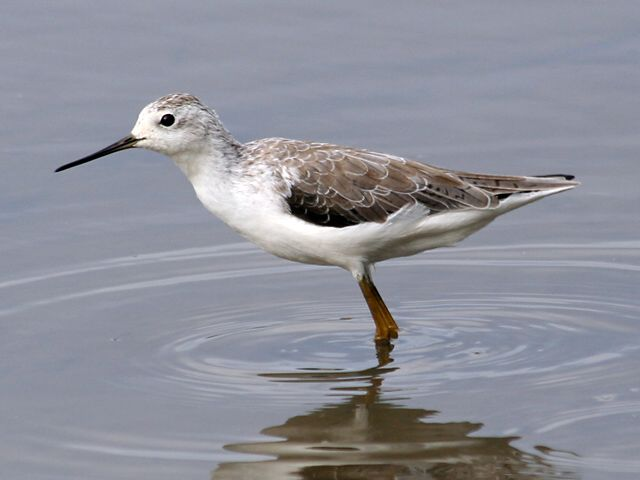
Marsh sandpiper

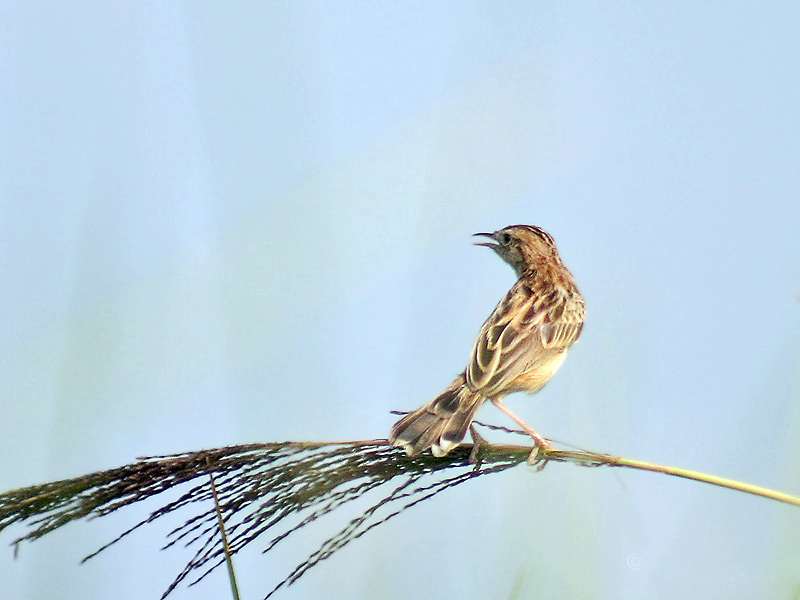
Zitting cisticola

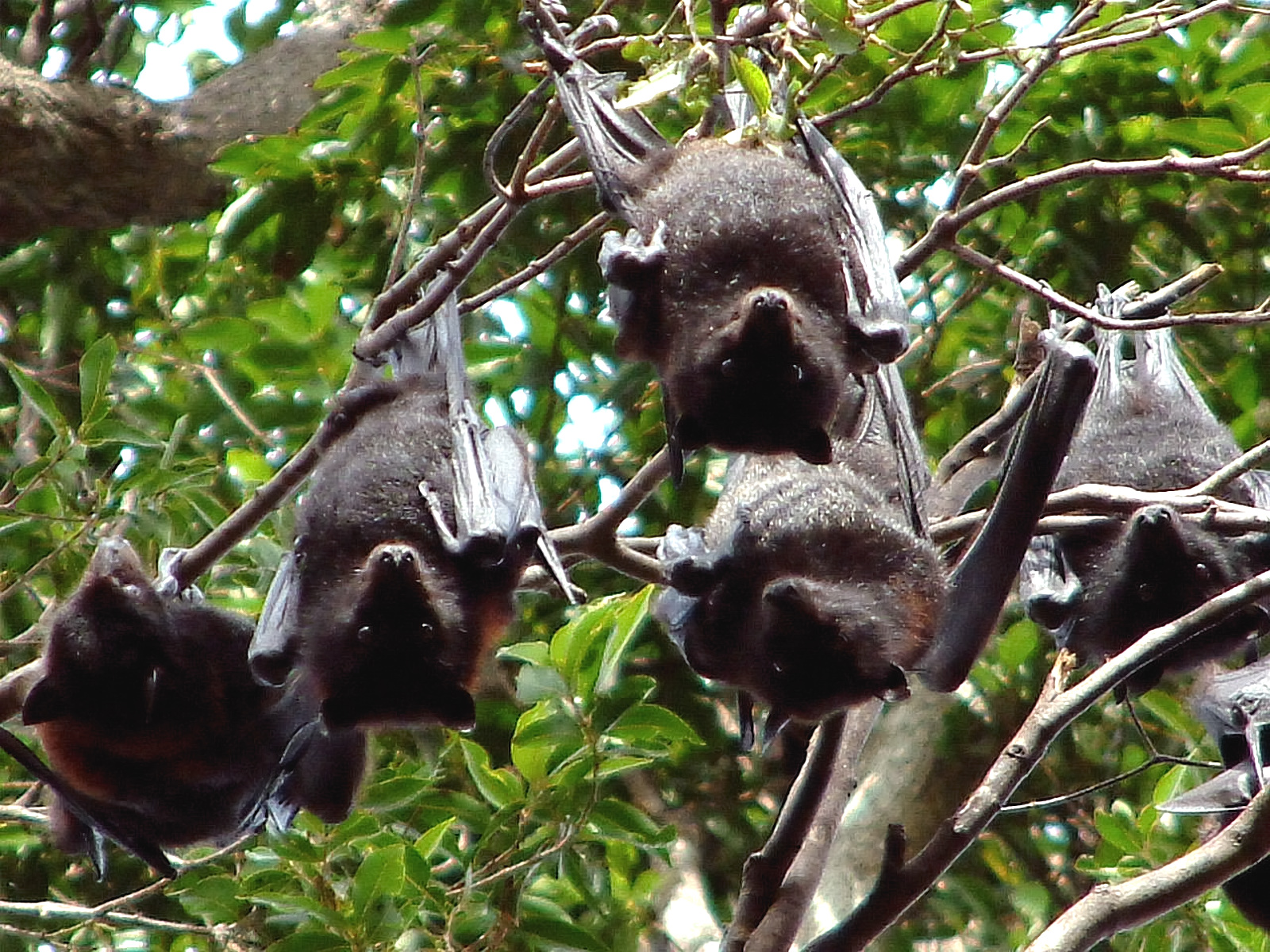
Black flying-fox

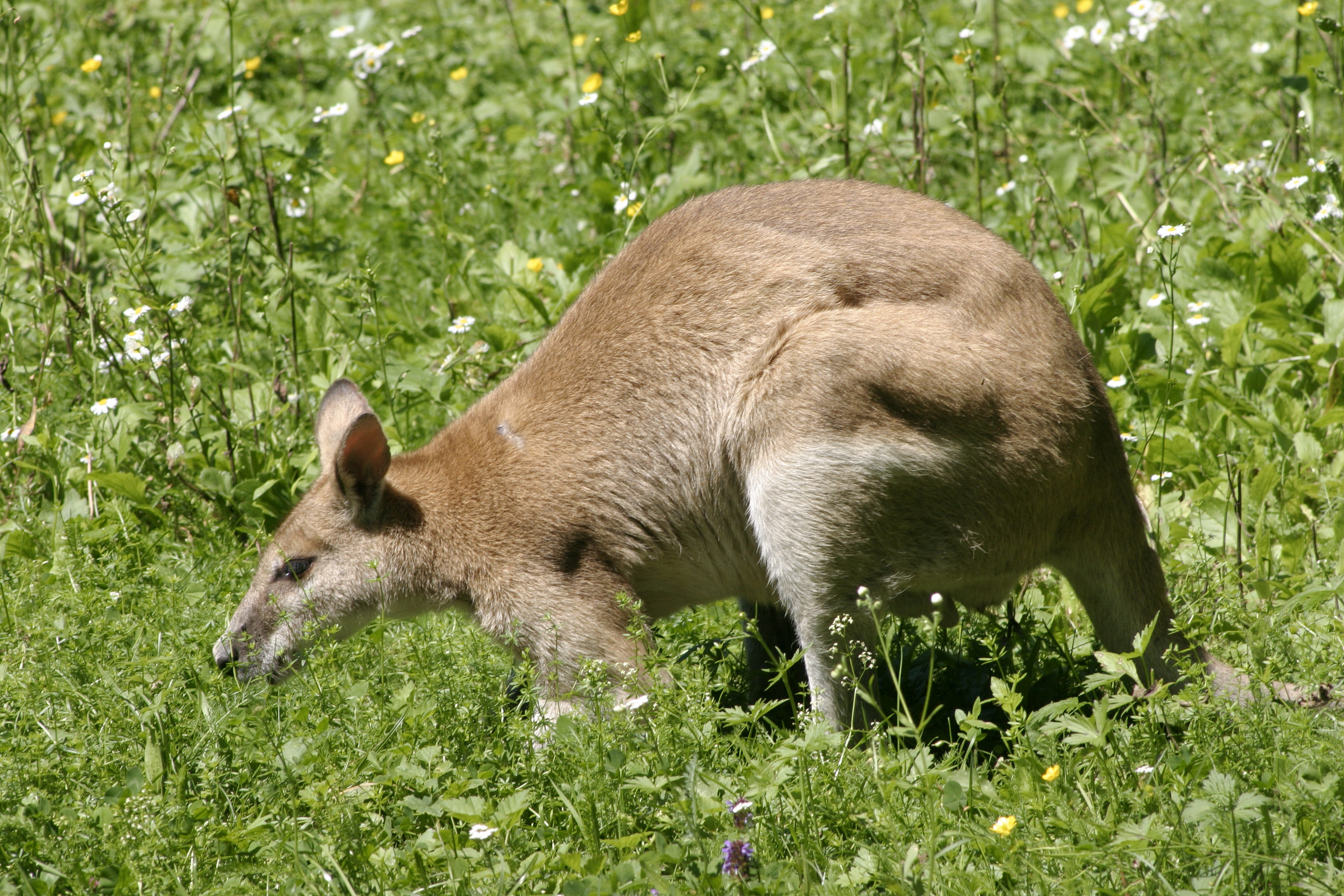
Agile wallaby

== Description ==
The site lies about 8 kilometres (5.0 mi) east of the town of Wyndham, extending from 14°51′S 128°12′E to 15°46′S 128°33′E. It comprises the Ord River and Parry Lagoons nature reserves, with some additional land. It lies downstream of two large impoundments on the Ord River, Lakes Argyle and Kununurra, which have had a major impact on the river's hydrology through changing its flow pattern so that there are now constant flows through the dry season. In effect, the lower Ord has been transformed through flow regulation at the dams from a ‘dry tropics’ to a ‘wet tropics’ river.

The southern part of the site is dominated by Parry Creek, including 20 kilometres (12 mi) of seasonal creek and an alluvial floodplain which is flooded during the wet season. It dries out quickly in the dry season, except for waterholes associated with incised channels and claypans. The southern, or upstream, part of the floodplain is freshwater, while the northern, or downstream part, is either regularly flooded with saltwater or contains saline soils.

The lower reaches of the Ord River extend from the Parry Creek floodplain northwards to the Cambridge Gulf. The upper reaches of the Ord River are permanently fresh; the lower reaches, when not in flood, become saline due to the tidal cycle which, at the coast, has an amplitude of up to 8 metres (26 ft). Within the site the upstream end of the river channel is around 150 metres (490 ft) wide with broad sand and gravel spits, while unstable mud bars and islands characterise the 5 kilometres (3.1 mi) wide mouth. From the mouth of the Ord River, the site extends northwards around the coast to include the False mouths of the Ord, consisting of a maze of deltaic channels, intertidal mudflats and low muddy islands, an area which receives only a little fresh water from small and ephemeral creeks.

=== Climate ===
The site has a dry tropical climate. Rainfall is monsoonal, with the hot and humid wet season occurring from November to March. Wyndham has an average annual rainfall of 695 millimetres (27.4 in). The dry season is mild, with periods of steady south-easterly winds. The average maximum temperature varies from 30 °C (86 °F) in July to 39 °C (102 °F) in December.

=== Flora and fauna ===
==== Vegetation ====
Within the site ten main vegetation associations have been identified: mudflats, mangroves, dune systems, grassland, low woodland, sandstone range open woodland, riverine woodland, rainforest (aquifer forest) and spring vegetation, major rivers and lagoons (permanent and ephemeral), and savanna woodland. Some 335 native vascular plants from 89 families have been recorded from the site, with 16 introduced species.

The eastern coast of the Cambridge Gulf is one of the richest places for mangroves in the Kimberley region in terms of species diversity, structural complexity, and area, with 14 species occurring within the site. Zonation is evident; mangrove species in the seaward zone form a woodland about 8 metres (26 ft) high, dominated by Sonneratia alba, Avicennia marina and Aegiceras corniculatum. Behind this, in a woodland 10 metres (33 ft) high, are Bruguiera parviflora, Avicennia marina and Aegiceras corniculatum, and then a belt of Rhizophora stylosa 12–15 metres (39–49 ft) high. On the landward edge is a 4 metres (13 ft) high thicket of Avicennia marina, Ceriops tagal and Aegialitis annulata. Sporobolus virginicus grassland and samphire grow on the mudflats behind the mangroves. Other occasional species of mangrove include Xylocarpus moluccensis, Excoecaria agallocha and Camptostemon schultzii.

==== Birds ====
The seasonal wetlands on the floodplain regularly support large numbers of waterbirds. Numerically important duck species include hardhead, grey teal and plumed whistling duck. The lagoons are also an important site for shorebirds: several thousand little curlews and Oriental pratincoles, and hundreds of wood sandpipers have been counted. The Parry Lagoons are probably the most important site in Australia for both wood and marsh sandpipers. When local rainfall is high the lagoons and other seasonal wetlands are major breeding areas for waterbirds in the Kimberley, with up to 77 species recorded in habitats associated with Parry Creek. The grasslands are the only place in Western Australia where zitting cisticolas occur naturally. The mangroves contain 12 of the 13 species of terrestrial bird restricted to such habitat, or to rainforest, in Western Australia, including the black butcherbird. About 200 bird species have been recorded from the site.

==== Other fauna ====
The lower Ord River contains a high density of salt water crocodiles. The mangroves support at least six species of microbat, the black flying-fox and grassland melomys. Other mammals known from the site include: the northern nail-tail wallaby, agile wallaby, long-haired rat and Kimberley rock rat. The critically endangered largetooth sawfish has been collected from the lower Ord River.

== Human activity ==
Aboriginal people have a complex and spiritual relationship with the land and waters of the Ord River. The site lies within the traditional lands of the Miriuwung and Gajerrong language groups, and there are many cultural heritage sites, including those concerned with ceremonial, mythological and burial activities, associated with the river.

The area is a regular tourist destination. Some exploration for alluvial diamonds takes place. The surrounding land is used for cattle grazing.
