= Gland (botany) =

Structure in plants

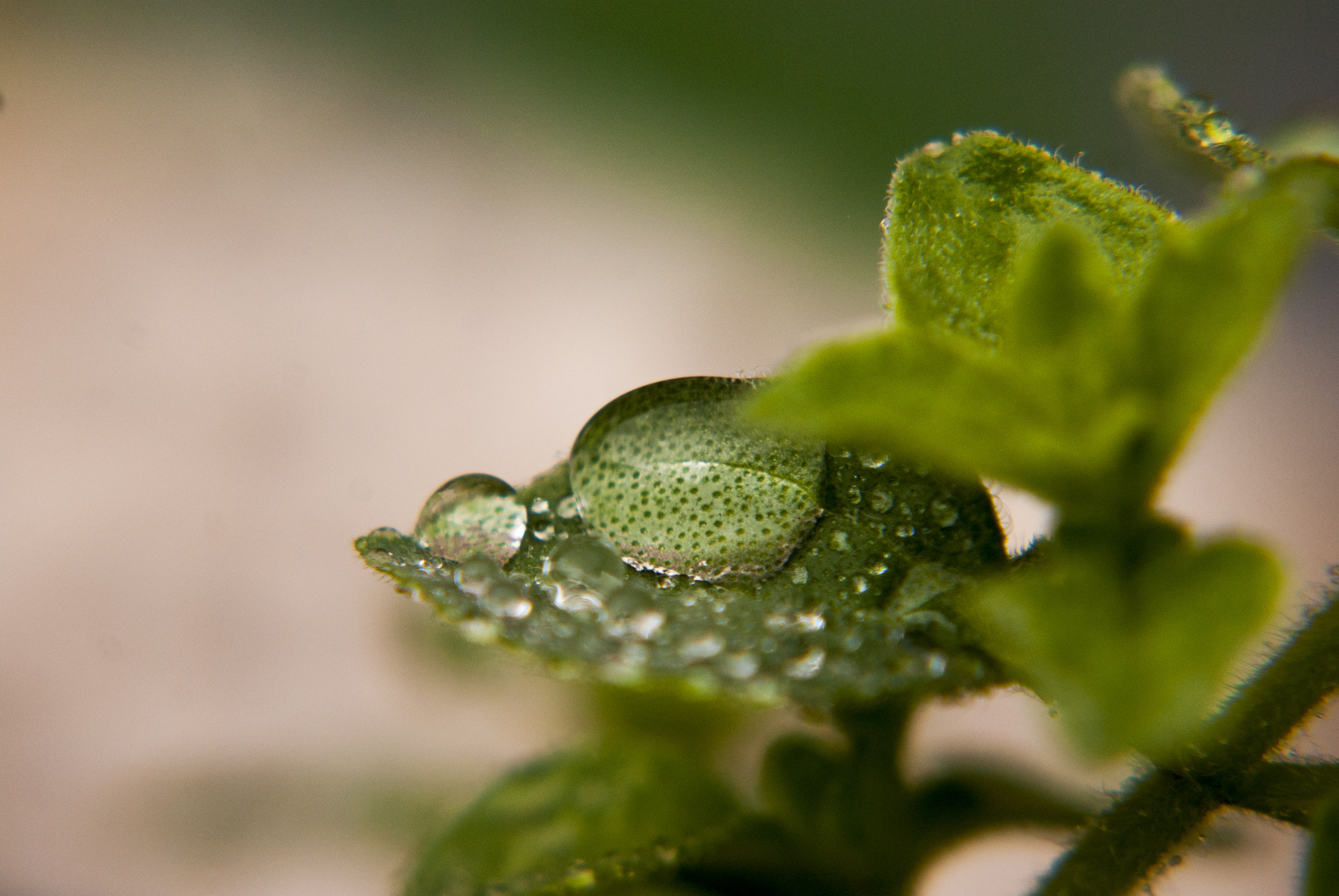
Origanum vulgare with water droplet magnifying the oil glands

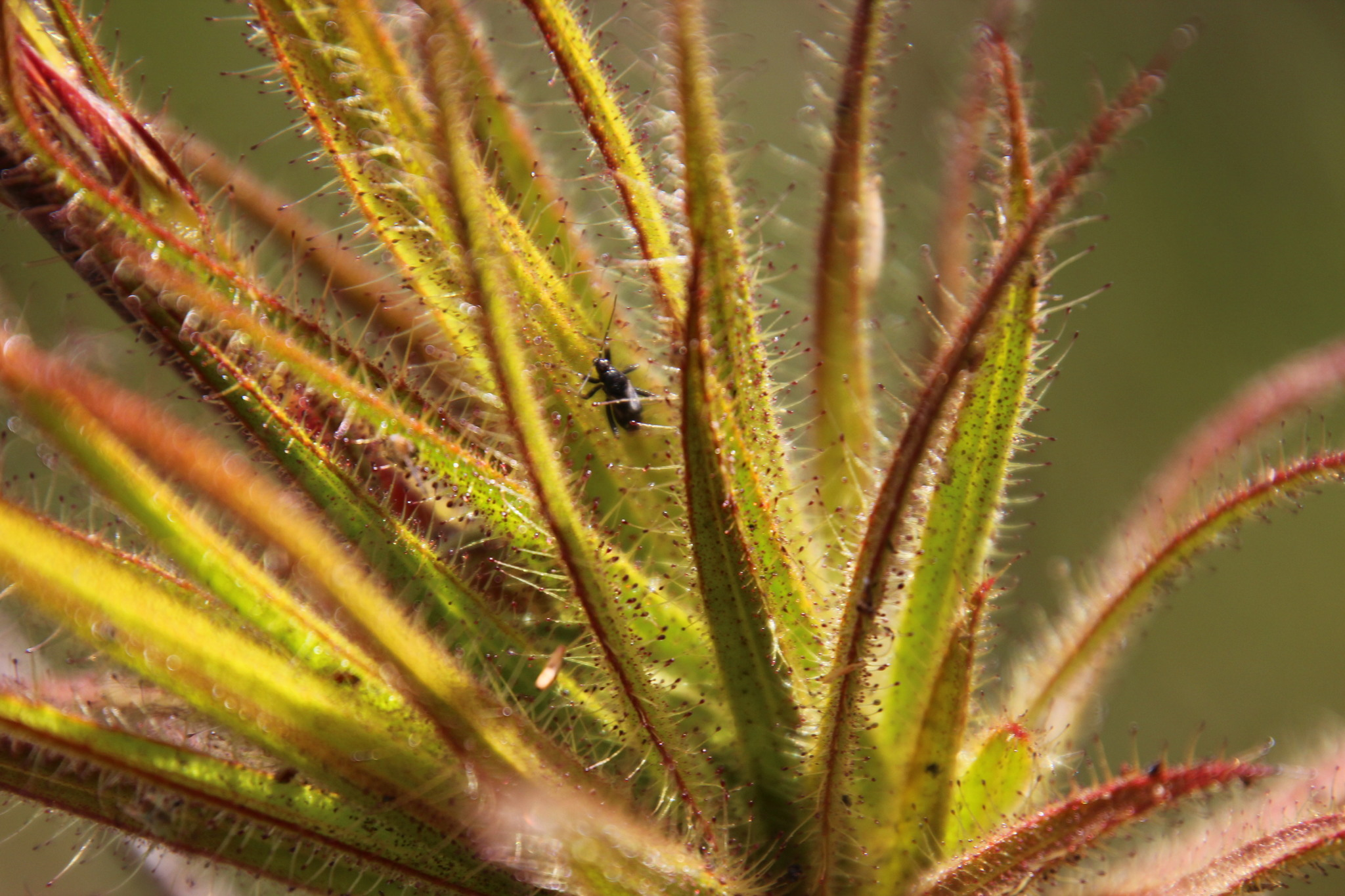
Roridula gorgonias showing glandular tentacles that secrete a resin that traps insects. Photo: Tony Rebelo.

In plants, a gland is defined functionally as a plant structure which secretes one or more products. This may be located on or near the plant surface and secrete externally, or be internal to the plant and secrete into a canal or reservoir. Examples include glandular hairs, nectaries, hydathodes, and the resin canals in Pinus.

== Notable examples ==
=== Salt glands of the mangrove ===
The salt glands of mangroves such as Acanthus, Aegiceras, Aegialitis and Avicennia are a distinctive multicellular trichome, a glandular hair found on the upper leaf surface and much more densely in the abaxial indumentum. On the upper leaf surface they are sunken in shallow pits, and on the lower surface they occur scattered among long nonglandular hairs composed of three or four cells. Development of the glands resembles that of the nonglandular hairs until the three-celled stage, when the short middle stalk cell appears. The salt gland continues to develop to produce two to four vacuolated cells at the level of the epidermis, the stalk cell with an almost completely cutinized wall, and at least eight terminal cells. The terminal cells have a thin, perforated cuticle which separates from the cell walls apically, leaving an enclosed cavity between them. The secreted salt evaporates and forms visible crystals.

=== Cannabinoid-secreting glands of Cannabis ===
Cannabis plants are broadly covered with sessile glands, and other hairs throughout above-ground portions of the plant. There is a particularly high concentration of glands on the bracts of the female plant. After flower formation begins, some of the glands, especially on bracts near the flowers, develop stalks projecting them outward from the plant surface. The glands consist of a layer of disk cells, whose outer surface splits to create a large secretory cavity lined by cell wall and cuticle components. Together the disk cells and secretory cavity form a round head atop the narrow stalk. These cavities come to contain large amounts of cannabidiol in hemp-producing strains, or tetrahydrocannabinol and cannabinol in other cannabis plants. These compounds appear to be produced beginning in specialized plastids called lipoplasts. These produce spheres of oily secretions, including terpenes, which pass through the cell membrane and wall to accumulate as vesicles in the secretory cavity. Final reaction to cannabinoids appears to occur outside the disk cell cytoplasm. The glands gradually darken as they mature, with loss of cannabinoids over time (perhaps to evaporation) and eventually undergo abscission from the plant.

=== Myrmecophytes ===
Glands are used by myrmecophyte plants to feed their ant symbiotes.
