= International Day for the Conservation of the Mangrove Ecosystem =

Annual United Nations day, 26 July

- Type: International
- Celebrations: UNESCO
- Begins: 2016
- Date: 26 July
- Next time: 26 July 2027

The International Day for the Conservation of the Mangrove Ecosystem is a UN Educational, Scientific and Cultural Organization (UNESCO) holiday celebrated every year on 26 July, aiming to raise awareness and promote sustainable protection of mangrove ecosystem.

This International Day was designated by the General Conference of UNESCO in 2015 and it was first held in July 2016.

Mangroves are prolific ecosystems, supporting rich biodiversity, and their soils are effective carbon sinks. They also form natural coastal barriers against storm surges.

Yet, according to UNESCO, some countries lost more than 40% of their mangroves between 1980 and 2005.

UNESCO's protection of the mangrove ecosystem involves the inclusion of mangroves in Biosphere Reserves, World Heritage sites and UNESCO Global Geoparks as well as the protection of the blue carbon ecosystem.
