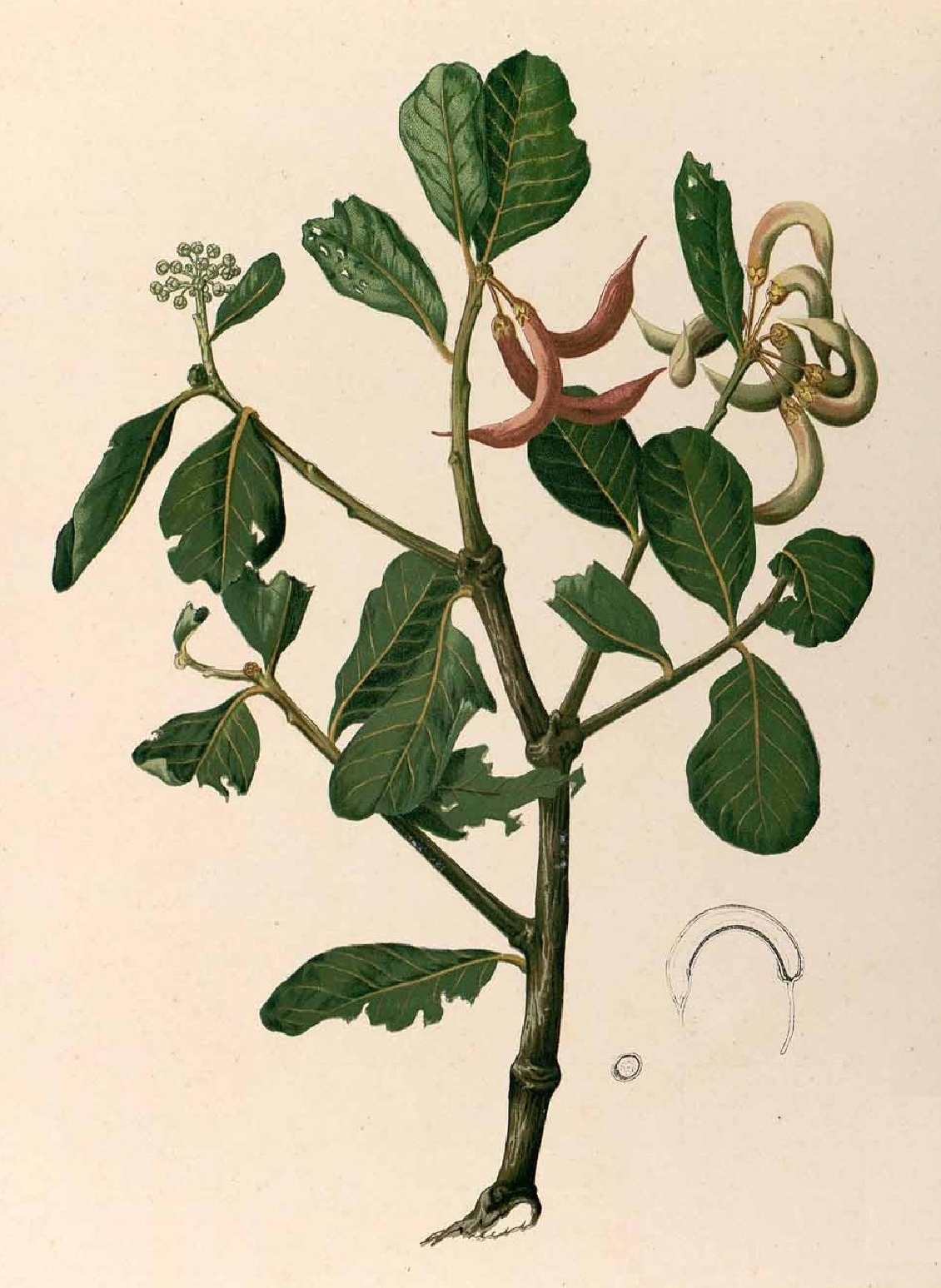

Conservation status
- Least Concern (IUCN 3.1)

Scientific classification
- Kingdom: Plantae
- Clade: Embryophytes
- Clade: Tracheophytes
- Clade: Angiosperms
- Clade: Eudicots
- Clade: Asterids
- Order: Ericales
- Family: Primulaceae
- Genus: Aegiceras
- Species: A. corniculatum

Binomial name
- Aegiceras corniculatum (L.) Blanco

Synonyms
- Rhizophora corniculata Linnaeus; Aegiceras fragrans; Aegiceras majus; Aegiceras malaspinaea

= Aegiceras corniculatum =

Species of flowering plant

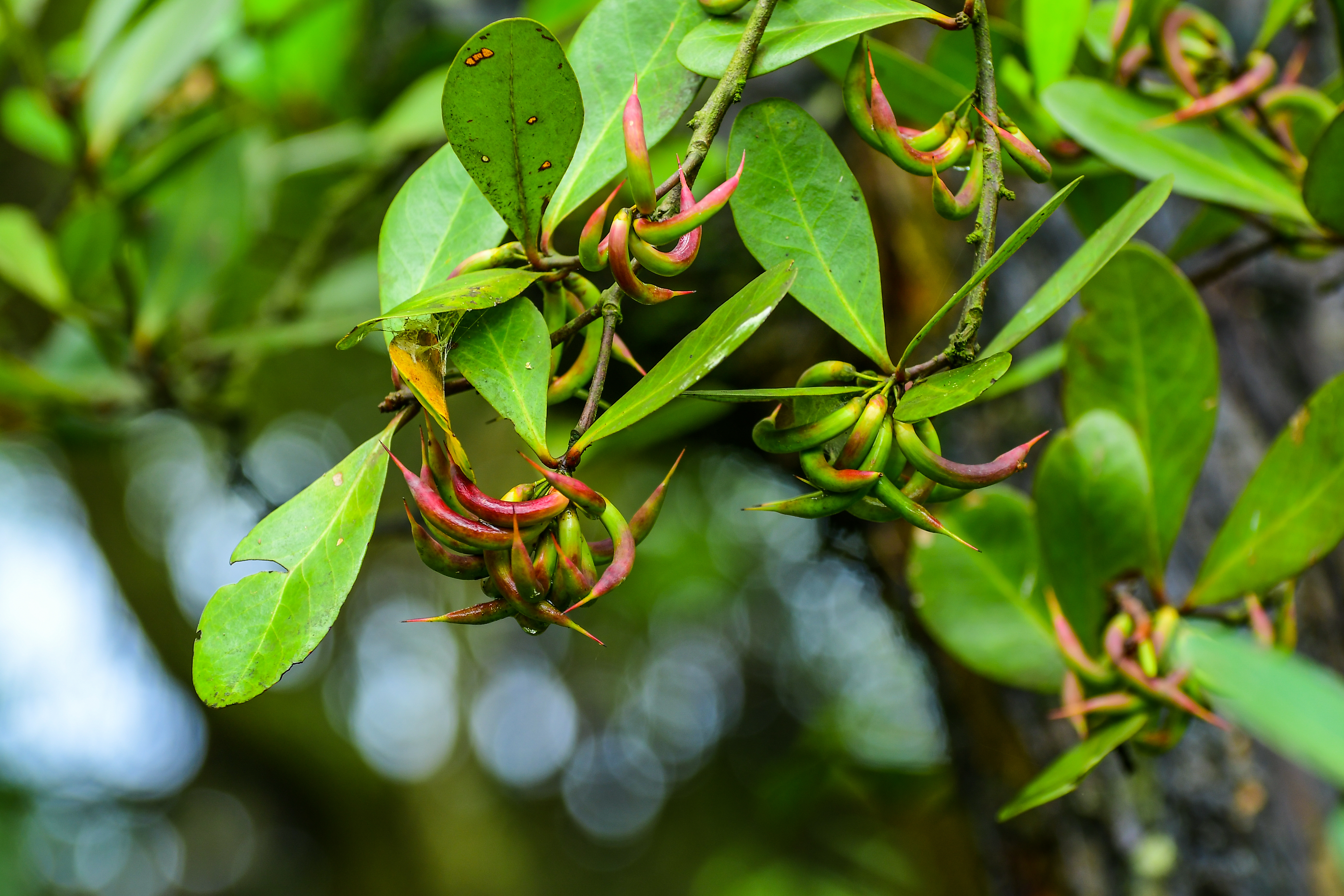
Seeds of Aegiceras corniculatum

Aegiceras corniculatum, commonly known as black mangrove, river mangrove, goat's horn mangrove, or khalsi, is a species of shrub or tree mangrove in the primrose family, Primulaceae, with a distribution in coastal and estuarine areas ranging from India through South East Asia to southern China, New Guinea and Australia.

== Description ==
Aegiceras corniculatum grows as a shrub or small tree up to 7 metres (23 ft) high, though often considerably less. Its leaves are alternate, obovate, 30–100 millimetres (1.2–3.9 in) long and 15–50 millimetres (0.59–1.97 in) wide, entire, leathery and minutely dotted. Its fragrant, small, white flowers are produced as umbellate clusters of 10–30, with a peduncle up to 10 mm long and with pedicels 10–18 millimetres (0.39–0.71 in) long. The calyx is 2–4 millimetres (0.079–0.157 in) long and corolla 4–6 millimetres (0.16–0.24 in) long. The fruit is curved and cylindrical or horn-shaped, light green to pink in colour and 20–75 millimetres (0.79–2.95 in) long. It grows in mud in estuaries and tidal creeks, often at the seaward edge of the mangrove zone.

The species is of interest to many moths, including species from the genera Anarsia, Archips and Phyllocnistis, as well as the species Darna trima, Gonodontis clelia and Neurozerra conferta.

== Medicinal uses ==
Aegiceras corniculatum extract has analgesic properties which supports a fight against diabetes. The stems of the plant contain up to seven compounds, including: 2-methoxy-3-nonylresorcinol, 5-O-ethylembelin, 2-O-acetyl-5-O-methylembelin, 3,7-dihydroxy-2,5-diundecylnaphthoquinone, 2,7-dihydroxy-8-methoxy-3,6-diundecyldibenzofuran-1,4-dione, 2,8-dihydroxy-7-methoxy-3,9-diundecyldibenzofuran-1,4-dione (6), and 10-hydroxy-4-O-methyl-2,11-diundecylgomphilactone.
