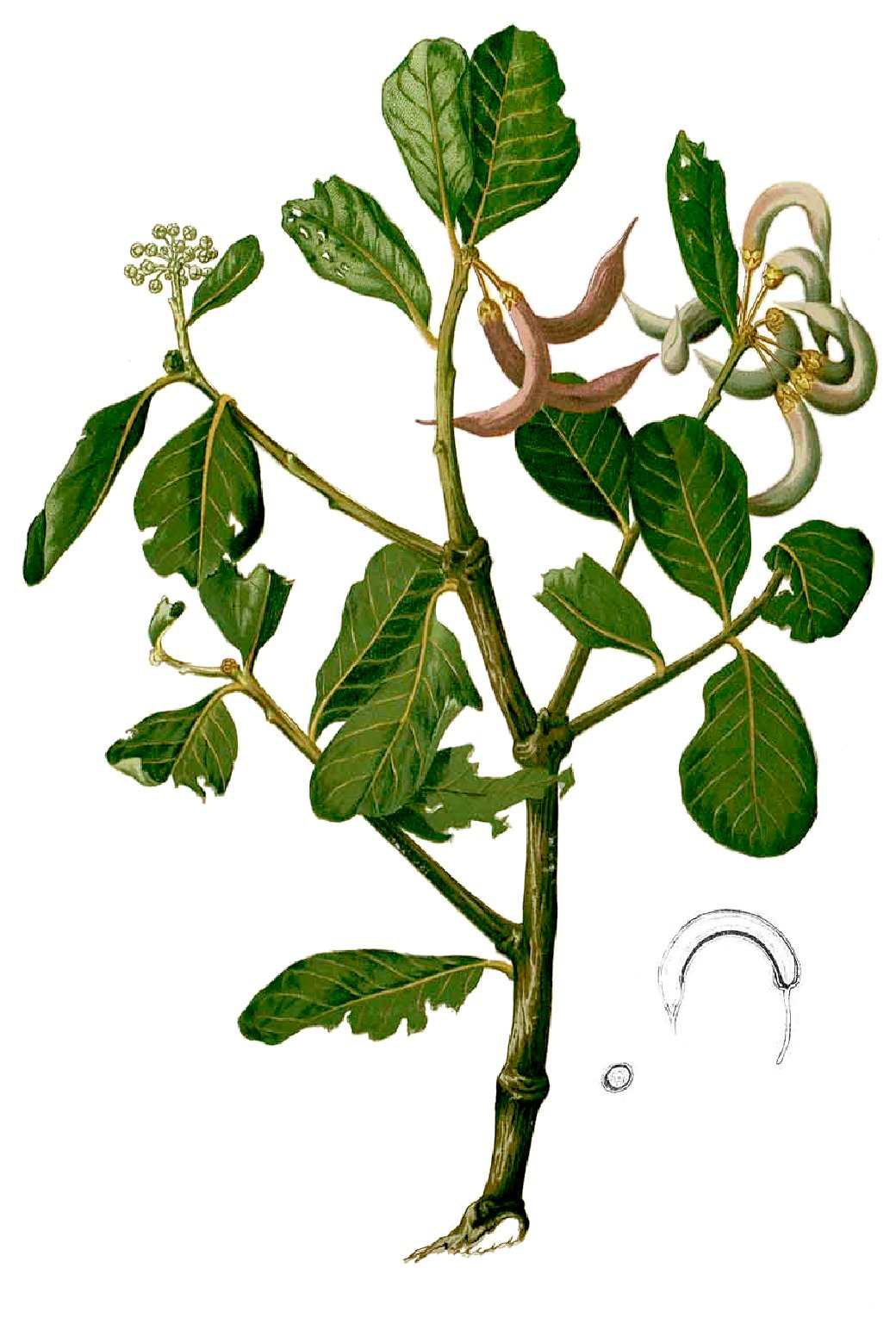
- Aegiceras corniculatum

Scientific classification
- Kingdom: Plantae
- Clade: Tracheophytes
- Clade: Angiosperms
- Clade: Eudicots
- Clade: Asterids
- Order: Ericales
- Family: Primulaceae
- Subfamily: Myrsinoideae
- Genus: Aegiceras; Gaertn.

Species
- See text

= Aegiceras =

Genus of flowering plants

Aegiceras is a genus of trees and shrubs from Southeast Asia, Malesia, Australia and the Pacific Island,. and in Australia, in the Northern Territory, Queensland, New South Wales, and Western Australia. They occur as mangroves in coastal or estuarine areas.

The genus was first described in 1788 by Joseph Gaertner. The genus name, Aegiceras, derives from two Greek words: aix ("goat") and keras ("horn", and describes the genus as having fruits with horns like a goat.

== Species ==
There are two species accepted by Plants of the World online.

- Aegiceras corniculatum (L.) Blanco
- Aegiceras floridum Roem. & Schult.
