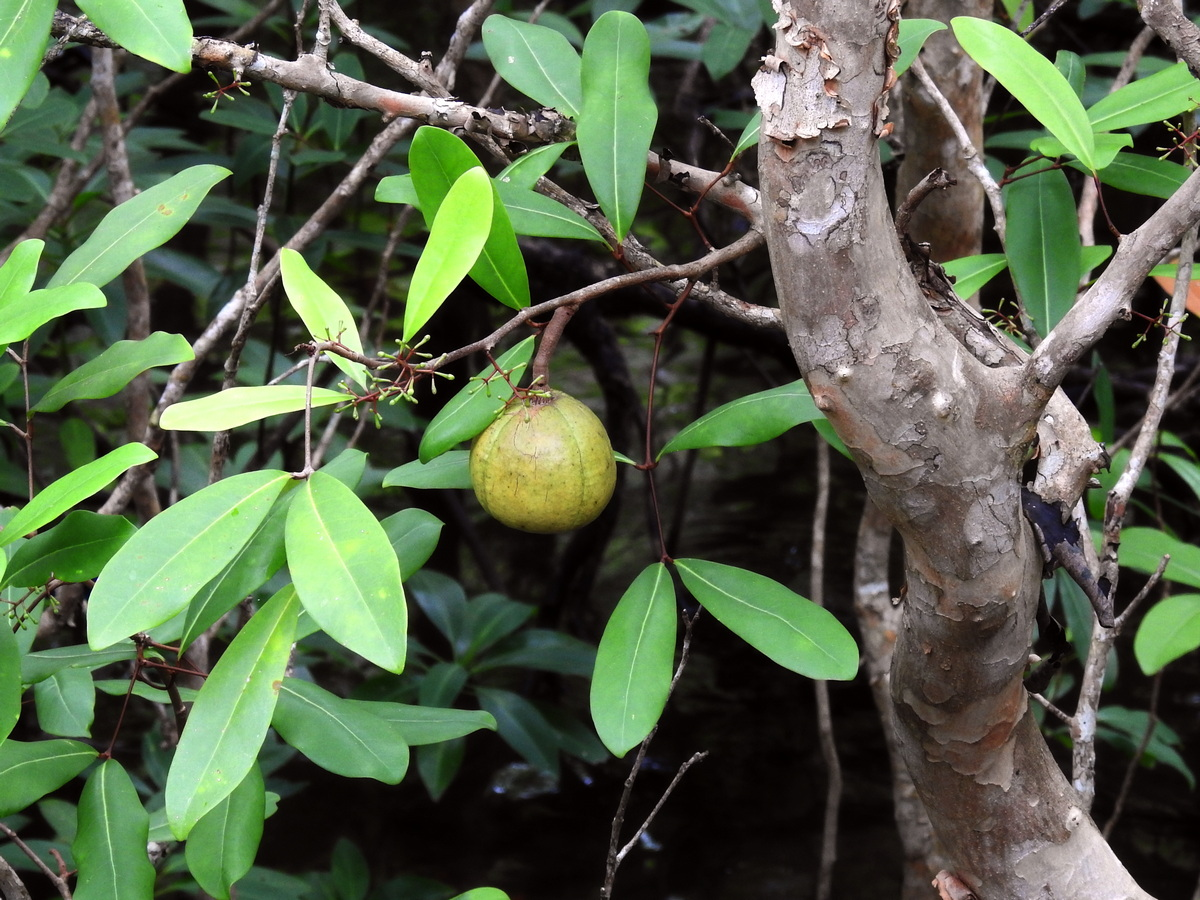
- Young tree with fruit and flower buds

Conservation status
- Least Concern (IUCN 3.1)

Scientific classification
- Kingdom: Plantae
- Clade: Tracheophytes
- Clade: Angiosperms
- Clade: Eudicots
- Clade: Rosids
- Order: Sapindales
- Family: Meliaceae
- Genus: Xylocarpus
- Species: X. moluccensis

Binomial name
- Xylocarpus moluccensis (Lam.) M.Roem.

Synonyms
- 17 synonyms: Carapa moluccensis Lam.; Granatum moluccense (Lam.) Kuntze; Carapa borneensis Becc.; Carapa mekongensis (Pierre) Pellegr.; Carapa moluccensis var. elliptica Koord. & Valeton; Carapa moluccensis var. gangetica Prain; Carapa moluccensis var. ovalifolia Koord. ex Prain; Carapa obovata var. microphylla (Pierre) Pellegr.; Guarea oblongifolia Griff.; Monosoma littorata Griff.; Xylocarpus australasicus Ridl.; Xylocarpus gangeticus (Prain) C.E.Parkinson; Xylocarpus mekongensis Pierre; Xylocarpus moluccensis var. ellipticus (Koord. & Valeton) Harms; Xylocarpus moluccensis var. gangeticus (Prain) Craib; Xylocarpus obovatus var. microphyllus Pierre; Xylocarpus parvifolius Ridl.

= Xylocarpus moluccensis =

Species of tree

Xylocarpus moluccensis is a tree in the family Meliaceae. The name derives from the Moluccas archipelago (now the Maluku Islands).

== Description ==
Xylocarpus moluccensis grows up to 30 m (98 ft) tall with a trunk diameter of up to 70 cm (28 in). The flowers are creamy-white. The fruit is rounded, and measures up to 11 cm (4.3 in) in diameter.

== Distribution and habitat ==
Xylocarpus moluccensis grows naturally from the Sundarbans of India and Bangladesh through Mainland Southeast Asia and Malesia to tropical Australia. Its habitat is mangrove swamps.
