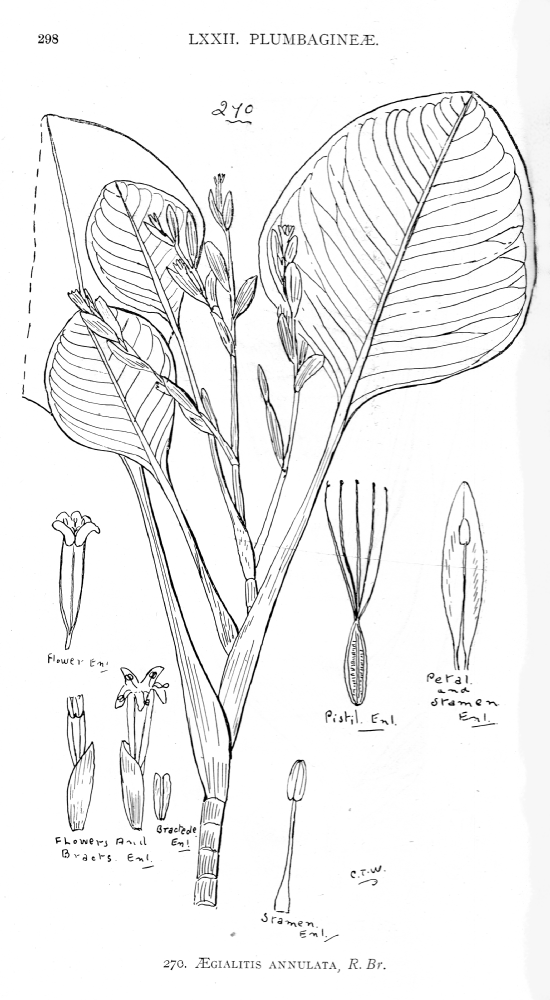
- Aegialitis annulata

Scientific classification
- Kingdom: Plantae
- Clade: Tracheophytes
- Clade: Angiosperms
- Clade: Eudicots
- Order: Caryophyllales
- Family: Plumbaginaceae
- Tribe: Aegialitideae; Z.X.Peng
- Genus: Aegialitis; R.Br.

Species
- Aegialitis annulata R.Br.; Aegialitis rotundifolia Roxb.

= Aegialitis =

Genus of flowering plants

Aegialitis is a genus of two shrubby mangrove species, with one native to Southeast Asia and the other native to Australia and Papua New Guinea.

== Description ==
The two species of the genus are woody mangrove shrubs or small trees that grow up to 2 to 3 m tall. The deciduous species have leafy stems with leathery leaves arranged alternately or spirally. The leaf margins are entire and have parallel veins.

The hermaphroditic flowers are pollinated by Hymenoptera, Lepidoptera, and Diptera. Flowers are arranged in terminal cymose racemous inflorescences. Individual flowers have five sepals arranged in a fused tube around the white gamopetalous corolla that has five petals fused into a short tube. The androecium consists of five stamens that are attached near the base of the corolla tube. The superior gynoecium has five carpels, each with a 1-celled pistil and unilocular ovaries. Fruit are dehiscent and have a spongy mesocarp.

Unlike other mangrove species, the members of Aegialitis generally do not have aerial roots.

== Taxonomy ==
The genus Aegialitis was described by Robert Brown in his 1810 work Prodromus Florae Novae Hollandiae et Insulae Van Diemen when he described the single species A. annulata. The second species was described by William Roxburgh in the 1830s. A genus of grasses was given the same genus name in 1820 by Carl Bernhard von Trinius and later renamed Rostraria.

There have been several opinions on the proper placement of the genus in relation to the rest of the Plumbaginaceae, though most authors have noted its distinct characteristics make it difficult to place properly. In 1968 Igorj Alexandrovich Linczevski suggested that the genus be included in its own monotypic family, the Aegialitidaceae. The Plumbaginaceae has historically been divided into either two subfamilies or two tribes and each approach has offered a different perspective of the proper taxonomic relationship in the family. Through cladistic analysis using both genetic and morphological characteristics, studies have concluded that Aegialitis is the sister taxon to the rest of its subfamily (Staticoideae) and thus has been assigned to the monotypic tribe Aegialitideae, which is sister to the tribe Staticeae (including the genera Acantholimon, Armeria, Goniolimon, Limoniastrum, and Limonium).

The genus name, Aegialitis, derives from the Greek, aegialos, ("seashore"), referring to where species of this genus are found.

== Distribution and habitat ==
The two species of the genus are native to Southeast Asia and Australia, but their distribution ranges do not overlap. A. annulata is found along the northern coasts of Australia from Western Australia through the Northern Territory and into Queensland and along the coastline of Papua New Guinea. A. rotundifolia is found on the shorelines of the Andaman Sea and the Bay of Bengal from Orissa to Mergui and on the Andaman Islands.

The distribution of these two species with respect to the other members of the Plumbaginaceae is suggestive of the evolutionary history and phylogenetic placement of Aegialitis. Several authors have discovered evidence for three distinct southern migrations of this mostly Northern Hemisphere family, the first of which remained isolated and evolved into the existing members of this genus. This hypothesized migration and evolutionary history explains the more primitive breeding system characteristics and morphology in this genus in relation to the rest of the family.

As with other mangrove species, the habitat preferred by the members of this genus are sandy or rocky soils in the more saline environment of the mangroves toward the sea. The species are thus halophytic.
