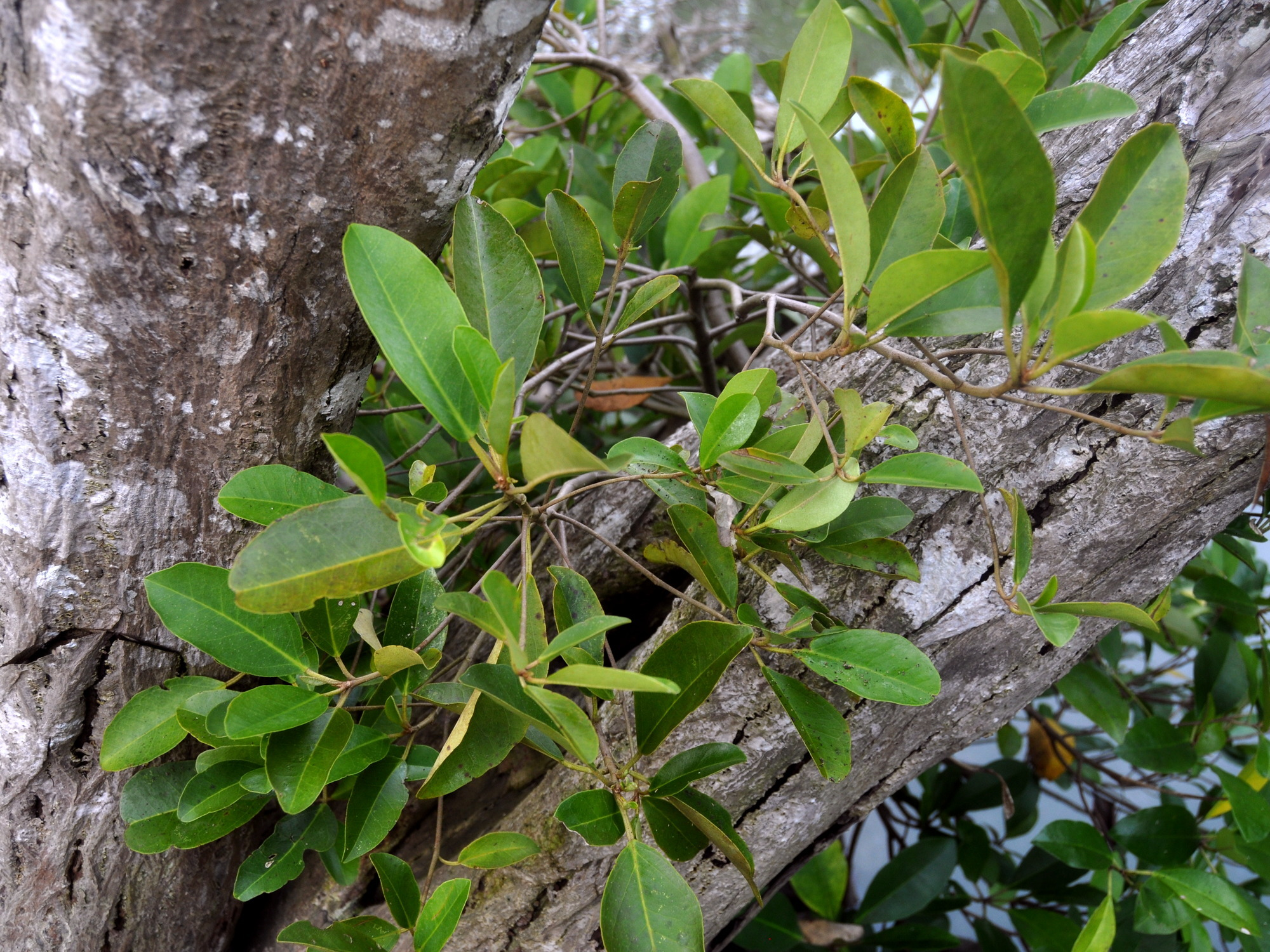
- Camptostemon philippinensis

Scientific classification
- Kingdom: Plantae
- Clade: Tracheophytes
- Clade: Angiosperms
- Clade: Eudicots
- Clade: Rosids
- Order: Malvales
- Family: Malvaceae
- Genus: Camptostemon; Mast.

Synonyms
- Cumingia S.Vidal

= Camptostemon =

Genus of flowering plants

Camptostemon is a genus of flowering plants belonging to the family Malvaceae.

Its native range is central Malesia (the Philippines and Sulawesi), New Guinea, and northern Australia.

Three species are accepted.

- Camptostemon aruensis Becc.
- Camptostemon philippinensis (S.Vidal) Becc.
- Camptostemon schultzii Mast.
