= Rhizophora × selala =

Scientific classification
- Kingdom: Plantae
- Clade: Tracheophytes
- Clade: Angiosperms
- Clade: Eudicots
- Clade: Rosids
- Order: Malpighiales
- Family: Rhizophoraceae
- Genus: Rhizophora
- Species: R. × selala

Binomial name
- Rhizophora × selala (Salvoza) P.B.Tomlinson

Synonyms
- Rhizophora mucronata var. selala Salvoza

Natural hybrid in the mangrove genus Rhizophora

Rhizophora × selala is a natural hybrid in the mangrove genus Rhizophora, in the family Rhizophoraceae. It is native to the southwestern Pacific, where it occurs in Fiji, New Caledonia, Tonga and Vanuatu.

== Taxonomy ==
The taxon was formally named by Filipino botanist Felipe Modesto Salvoza in 1936 as Rhizophora mucronata var. selala. Salvoza based the name on an earlier account by British naturalist Henry Brougham Guppy, who had described a sterile form of Rhizophora from Fiji.

In 1978, botanist P. B. Tomlinson concluded that selala was a natural hybrid rather than a variety of R. mucronata. He published it under the new combination and status Rhizophora × selala (Salvoza) Toml. Plants of the World Online accepts R. × selala and lists Salvoza's earlier name, R. mucronata var. selala, as a synonym.

The name selala is derived from a Fijian name meaning "empty flower", referring to the plant's sterility.

== Hybrid origin ==
A 2017 review of natural hybridization in mangroves treated R. × selala as a natural hybrid between R. samoensis and R. stylosa. The review recorded the hybrid from Fiji, New Caledonia, Tonga and Vanuatu and summarized morphological and molecular evidence for its hybrid origin.

A 2021 phylogeographic study of the genus Rhizophora identified R. × selala as a sterile F1 hybrid between R. samoensis and R. stylosa. Genetic analyses indicated that R. samoensis was the maternal lineage and R. stylosa the paternal lineage, and suggested that hybrid formation had occurred independently and recurrently in Fiji and New Caledonia.

Plants of the World Online gives the parentage as R. samoensis × R. stylosa.
