= Rhizophora × lamarckii =

Scientific classification
- Kingdom: Plantae
- Clade: Tracheophytes
- Clade: Angiosperms
- Clade: Eudicots
- Clade: Rosids
- Order: Malpighiales
- Family: Rhizophoraceae
- Genus: Rhizophora
- Species: R. × lamarckii

Binomial name
- Rhizophora × lamarckii Montrouz.

Species of tree

Rhizophora × lamarckii is a hybrid of Rhizophora apiculata and Rhizophora stylosa. Found in the Indo-West Pacific region within the Indomalaya biome in the Sunda Shelf mangroves ecoregion, the hybrid is widespread and shares many characters of its parents.

== Description ==
The tree grows up to 25 meters in height. The bark is gray with fissures. Leaf blade is obovate elliptic with light green midrib and dense black dots at under surface. Leaf apex has a clear mucronate spike and leaf stalk is 2–3 cm long. Inflorescence is branched 1-2 times with 2-4 buds borne on short peduncle. Petals are white and slightly hairy with style 2–3 mm long.

== Chemistry ==
Analysis using reversed phase high performance liquid chromatography showed that there was great similarity in chemical constituents of leaves of the hybrid compared to those of its parents (Chan & Wong, 2009). Peak areas were intermediate in R. × lamarckii with higher values in R. stylosa and lower values in R. apiculata. One of the compounds identified in the leaves of the hybrid and its parents was rutin.
