= Indian mangrove =

Indian mangrove may refer to:

- Avicennia officinalis
- Ceriops tagal
