= Lexicon of Philippine Trees =

Philippine reference work on tree nomenclature

Lexicon of Philippine Trees is a Philippine botanical and forestry reference work by Felipe Modesto Salvosa, published by the Forest Products Research Institute in 1963. The work provided official common names and corresponding scientific names for some 3,800 indigenous and introduced tree species found in the Philippines. It was revised by Justo P. Rojo in 1999 and updated by Fernando C. Pitargue Jr. and Glenn B. Estudillo in 2022 as the Updated Salvosa Lexicon.

== History ==
=== Original work ===
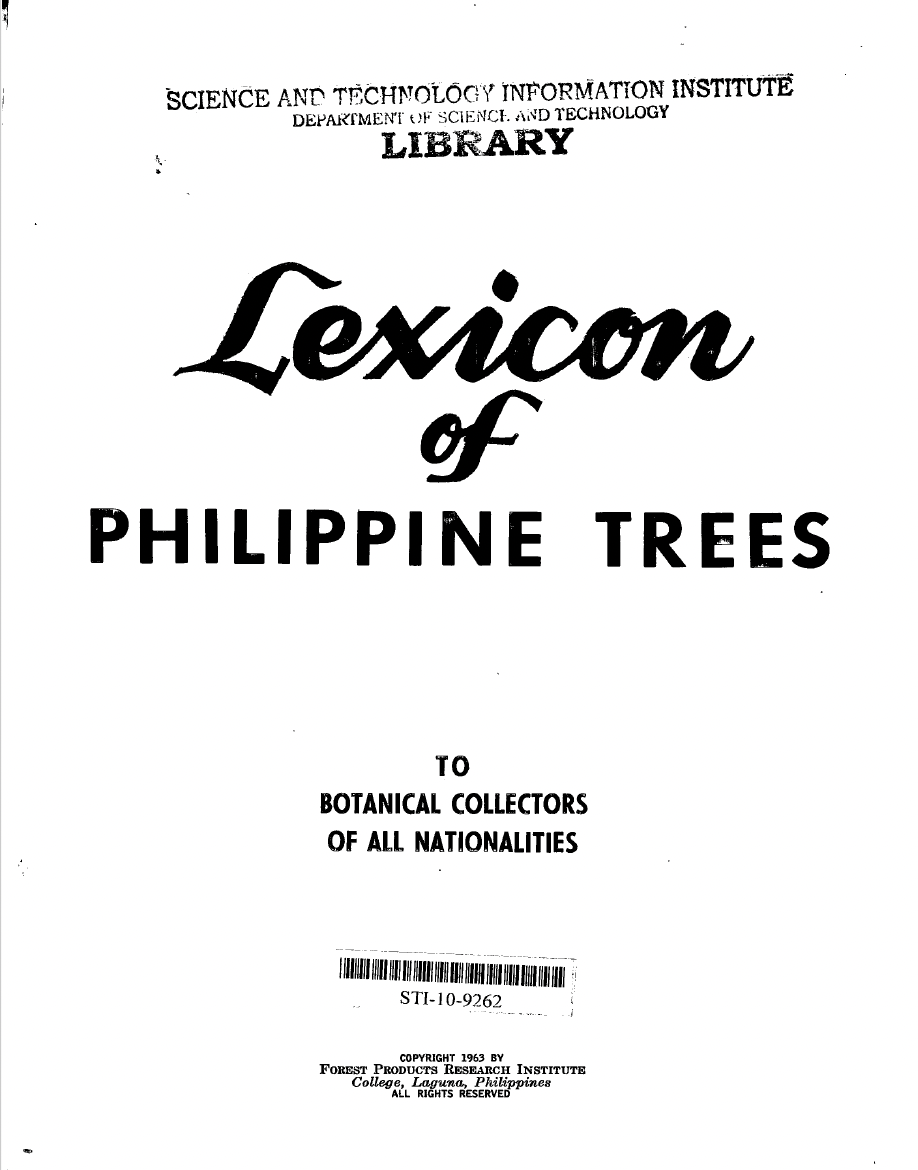
Cover page of the Lexicon of Philippine Trees published in 1963.

Salvosa prepared an earlier version of the work under the title A Forestry Lexicon of Philippine Trees. A 1960 edition published by the Forest Products Research Institute in College, Laguna, is catalogued by the Philippine eLib.

The completed Lexicon of Philippine Trees (To Botanical Collectors of All Nationalities) was published in 1963 by the Forest Products Research Institute in College, Laguna. The volume had 136 pages.

The Lexicon was intended for use by foresters, researchers, academics and forest-related industries. Its principal emphasis was the adoption of an official common name for each tree species found in the Philippines. It listed around 3,800 indigenous and introduced species. The official common names were largely adopted from the Bureau of Forestry's 1947 Philippine Journal of Forestry, while the scientific names were based mainly on Elmer D. Merrill's Enumeration of Philippine Flowering Plants, published from 1923 to 1926.

The work was arranged in two parts, allowing trees to be located through either their official common names or their scientific names.

The 1963 Lexicon followed the orthography in E. E. Schneider's The Philippine Alphabet, as revised by Elmer D. Merrill in 1926. It used an alphabet of 20 letters: a, b, k, d, e, g, h, i, l, m, n, ng, o, p, r, s, t, u, w, and y, with ng treated as a single letter. The system generally substituted k for c and q, used an acute accent to indicate stress, and prescribed conventions for hyphenation and capitalization.

=== 1999 revision ===
Botanist Justo P. Rojo revised the work in 1999 as the Revised Lexicon of Philippine Trees, published by the Forest Products Research and Development Institute of the Department of Science and Technology. The 484-page revision contained descriptions of more than 3,000 species of Philippine trees, including information on their distribution and synonyms.

Rojo changed the organization of the work, arranging trees alphabetically by family and, within each family, by genus and species. He also added literature citations and information on habitat, distribution and synonyms. The revision of plant names relied mainly on revisions of taxa published in botanical and taxonomic literature, including Blumea and the Flora Malesiana publication series.

=== Updated Salvosa Lexicon ===
A further revision by Fernando C. Pitargue Jr. and Glenn B. Estudillo was published by the DOST–Forest Products Research and Development Institute as the Updated Salvosa Lexicon. The book was printed in December 2022 and has 371 pages.

The authors returned to the two-part format of Salvosa's 1963 Lexicon. Section A lists official common names of trees found in the Philippines, while Section B lists their currently accepted scientific names. The common names from the original Lexicon were retained, while introduced species included in Rojo's revision were added.

The scientific names and family placements were updated principally using Plants of the World Online (POWO), with other databases used as secondary sources. The revision also took into account changes in the classification of flowering plants under the Angiosperm Phylogeny Group system. Where a scientific name used in the 1963 Lexicon had subsequently been treated as a synonym, the updated work lists it as such.

The updated work retained language abbreviations, tree-size symbols and notation for wood specimens at the DOST-FPRDI Herbarium and Xylarium used in the 1963 Lexicon.

== Author ==
Felipe Modesto Salvosa (1892–1969), also spelled Salvoza, was a Filipino forester and botanist whose work included the taxonomy and nomenclature of woody plants. He studied forestry at the University of the Philippines Los Baños and later at the New York State College of Forestry at Syracuse University. He subsequently undertook graduate study at Harvard University, where his research included the taxonomy of the mangrove genus Rhizophora.

Salvosa taught dendrology and botany at the University of the Philippines School of Forestry and conducted botanical research on woody plants. His work included the collection of plant specimens in the Philippines and the Americas and the taxonomic study of Rhizophora. In 1936, he published a treatment of the genus in the Natural and Applied Science Bulletin of the University of the Philippines, including the combination Rhizophora samoensis (Hochr.) Salvoza and the name Rhizophora mucronata var. selala, the latter subsequently treated as the natural hybrid Rhizophora × selala.

Salvosa's work on Philippine tree nomenclature included the Lexicon of Philippine Trees. An earlier work, A Forestry Lexicon of Philippine Trees, was published in 1960, followed by the 1963 Lexicon, published as Bulletin No. 1 of the Forest Products Research Institute.

== Organization ==
The original Lexicon used a two-way arrangement of tree names. One section listed official common names with their corresponding scientific names, while the other listed scientific names with their official common names.

The 1999 revision departed from this arrangement by organizing its entries according to family, genus and species and adding descriptive and taxonomic information. The 2022 edition restored the two-part arrangement while updating the scientific nomenclature.

== Publication history ==
Year	Title	Author	Publisher	Details
1960	A Forestry Lexicon of Philippine Trees	Felipe M. Salvosa	Forest Products Research Institute	Earlier work
1963	Lexicon of Philippine Trees	Felipe M. Salvosa	Forest Products Research Institute	136 pages
1999	Revised Lexicon of Philippine Trees	Justo P. Rojo	DOST–Forest Products Research and Development Institute	484 pages
2022	Updated Salvosa Lexicon	Fernando C. Pitargue Jr. and Glenn B. Estudillo	DOST–Forest Products Research and Development Institute	371 pages; ISBN 978-971-626-052-6
