= Rekawa Lagoon =

Rekawa Lagoon රැකව කලපුව
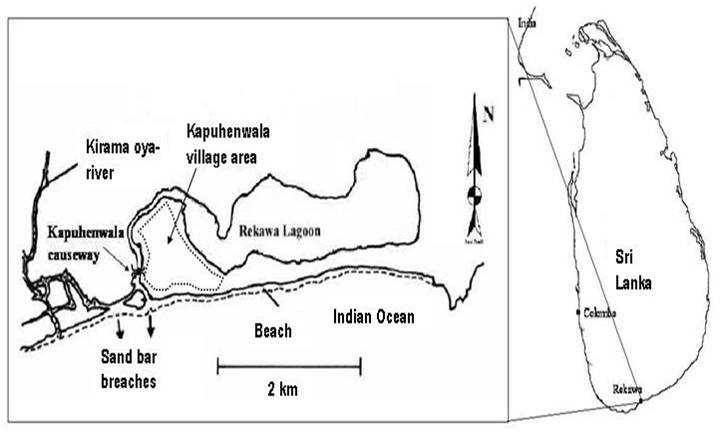
- Map of the Rekawa Lagoon with the location of the major freshwater inflow

- Location within Sri Lanka
- Location: Hambantota District, Sri Lanka
- Coordinates: 6°03′N 80°50′E
- Type: Lagoon
- Primary inflows: Kirama oya-stream (Tangalu oya-stream), Rekawa oya-stream
- Primary outflows: Indian Ocean
- Catchment area: 225 square kilometres (87 sq mi)
- Basin countries: Sri Lanka
- Max. length: 3.2 km (2.0 mi)
- Max. width: 0.98 km (0.61 mi)
- Surface area: 2.5 square kilometres (0.97 sq mi)
- Average depth: 1.4 metres (4.6 ft)
- Surface elevation: Sea level

Rekawa Lagoon (Sinhala: රැකව කලපුව) is a coastal waterbody located in Hambantota District in the Southern Province, Sri Lanka and it is located 200 km (120 mi) south of Colombo. The lagoon possesses a rich biodiversity with a variety of flora (ex; mangroves) and fauna (ex; fish, crustaceans, birds).

== Features ==
Rekawa Lagoon is a comparatively small coastal lagoon with a water surface area of 2.4 km^{2} (0.93 sq mi). The lagoon is connected to the Indian Ocean with a 3 km (1.9 mi) narrow inland waterway. Rekawa lagoon is shallow with a depth of averaging 1.4 m (4.6 ft) and the widest point is approximately 2.5 km (1.6 mi). Most parts of the lagoon are encircled with a mangrove belt. Kirama-oya river (Tangalu-oya river) that enters the lagoon at the sea ward end of the inlet canal is the main freshwater supply. Apart from the main freshwater inflow, there are two small freshwater streams function only in rainy season and provide surface runoff from the catchment. The total hydro-catchment of the lagoon outlet is about 225 km^{2} (87 sq mi).

== Shrimp fishery ==
Shrimp fishery is one of the main livelihoods among the lagoonal community. However this supports the people only during the shrimp fishery season which extends from October to April. The most abundant shrimp species in Rekawa lagoon and commercially most important shrimp species is Penaeus indicus (White shrimp).

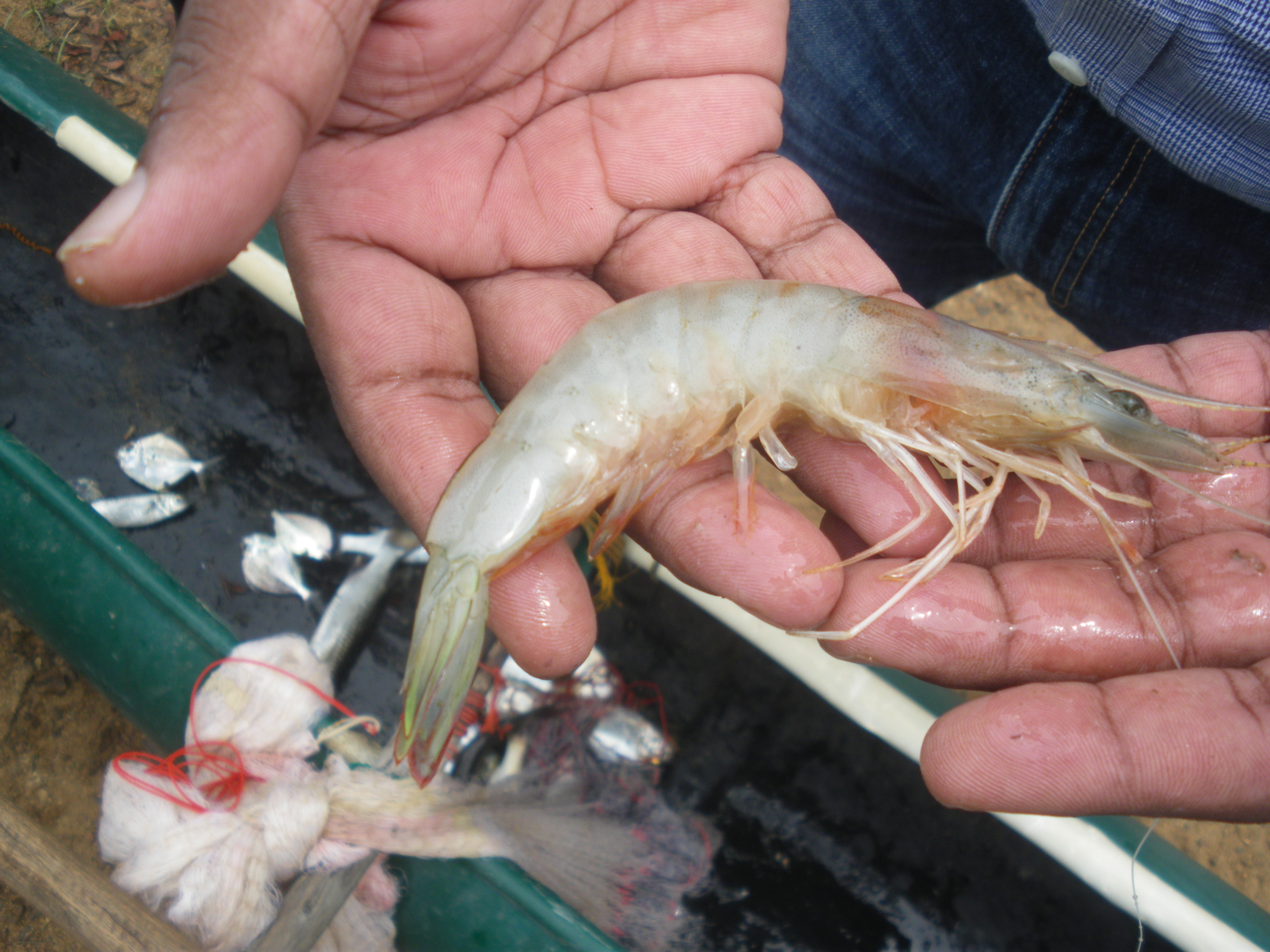
White shrimp

== Environmental problems ==
=== Ecohydrological impact of the Kapuhenwela causeway ===
In 1984 the Road Development Authority of Tangalle built a causeway called Kapuhenwela across the outlet canal; around 700 metres (2,300 ft) from the lagoon mouth to the inland. Water passes under the causeway through twenty three, 23 cm diameter pipes which greatly reduce the volume and speed of water entering and leaving the lagoon system. This causeway has prevented flushing of the lagoon by natural water flow, causing continues sedimentation in the lagoon. In 1999 a bridge of 6.2 metres (20 ft) in length was constructed in place of the part of the causeway in order to improve free water flow. After the Indian Ocean Tsunami in 2004, minor damage was inflicted on the causeway and it was renovated and replaced with eight cylindrical culverts with an average diameter of 79 cm (31 in) in 2005. Causeway itself and its modifications provoked concern over local resource users and environmentalists as the lagoon hydrology (ex; reduced flushing), salinity and there by the ecology (ex; reduction in shrimp catch) showed drastic changes and variations Before the construction of causeway, the effective channel cross section was 87 square metres (940 sq ft) which was then reduced to 25 m (82 ft) with the introduction of existing causeway structure with the bridge, a drop of 71% of effective channel cross section.

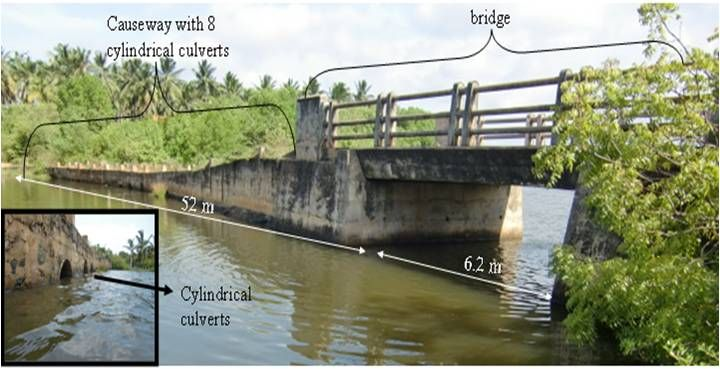
Existing situation of the causeway with eight cylindrical culverts and the partial bridge

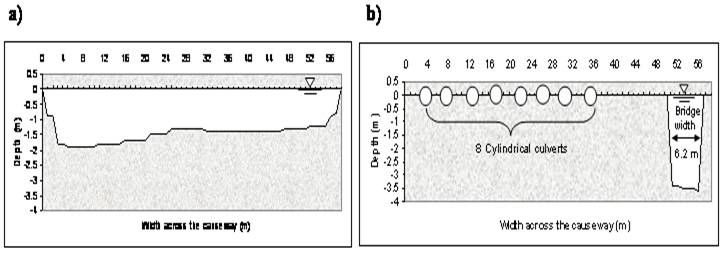
Schematic representation of channel cross section at the causeway before 1984 (a) and cross section of the causeway after 2005 (b)

=== Mangroves exploitation ===
Around the lagoon, many mangrove species including Lumnitzera racemosa, Aegiceras corniculatum, Bruguiera gymnorhiza, Excoecaria agallocha, Rhizophora mcronata, Avicennia marina, and Avicennia officinalis are found. In addition to its ecological benefits (ex; shrimp and fish habitats), traditionally, Rekawa people have used mangroves for the benefit of the local community, but the increasing population has led to an increasing non-sustainable abuse of the resources. Mangroves have been exploited for timber for building dwellings and boats and fuel-wood for cooking in the area. Recent Researches discovered, even small scale cutting could affect the age composition and reproductive capacity of the mangrove forests in Rekawa lagoon.

== Research work ==
A number of studies have been carried out recently on ecohydrology and mangroves of the Rekawa Lagoon. Ex;

1. Water balance and renewal time of Rekawa lagoon, Sri Lanka; a restorative approach.
2. Present status of small-scale exploitation of mangroves in Rekawa Lagoon, Sri Lanka.
3. Effects of industrialisation and urbanisation on the biology and water quality of three lagoons in southern Sri Lanka viz. Rekawa, Dondra and Galle with reference to water pollution and upstream land uses.
4. Applicability of Salinity Stratification Estimation by New Bulk Model for Two Choked Coastal Lagoons in Sri Lanka.
5. Variation of Natural Recruitments, Root Yield and Belowground Carbon Stocks between a Forest Gap and Uncut Forest in Rekawa Mangroves, Sri Lanka.
