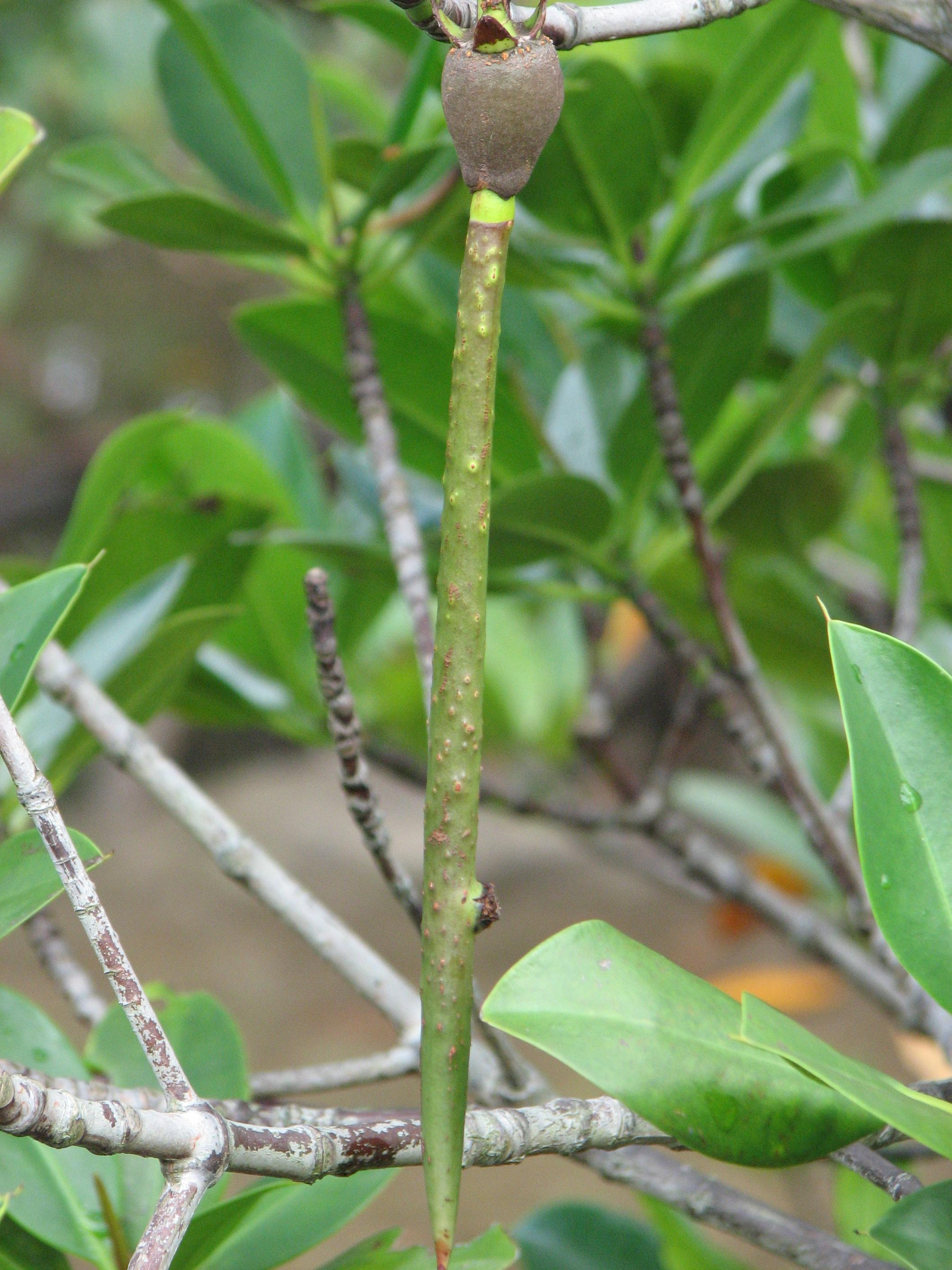
- With propagule

Conservation status
- Least Concern (IUCN 3.1)

Scientific classification
- Kingdom: Plantae
- Clade: Embryophytes
- Clade: Tracheophytes
- Clade: Spermatophytes
- Clade: Angiosperms
- Clade: Eudicots
- Clade: Rosids
- Order: Malpighiales
- Family: Rhizophoraceae
- Genus: Rhizophora
- Species: R. mucronata

Binomial name
- Rhizophora mucronata Lam.

Synonyms
- Mangium candelarium Rumphius; Rhizophora candelaria Wight & Arn.; Rhizophora longissima Blanco; Rhizophora macrorrhiza Griff.

= Rhizophora mucronata =

Species of plant

Rhizophora mucronata (loop-root mangrove, red mangrove or Asiatic mangrove) is a species of mangrove found on coasts and river banks in East Africa and the Indo-Pacific region.

== Description ==
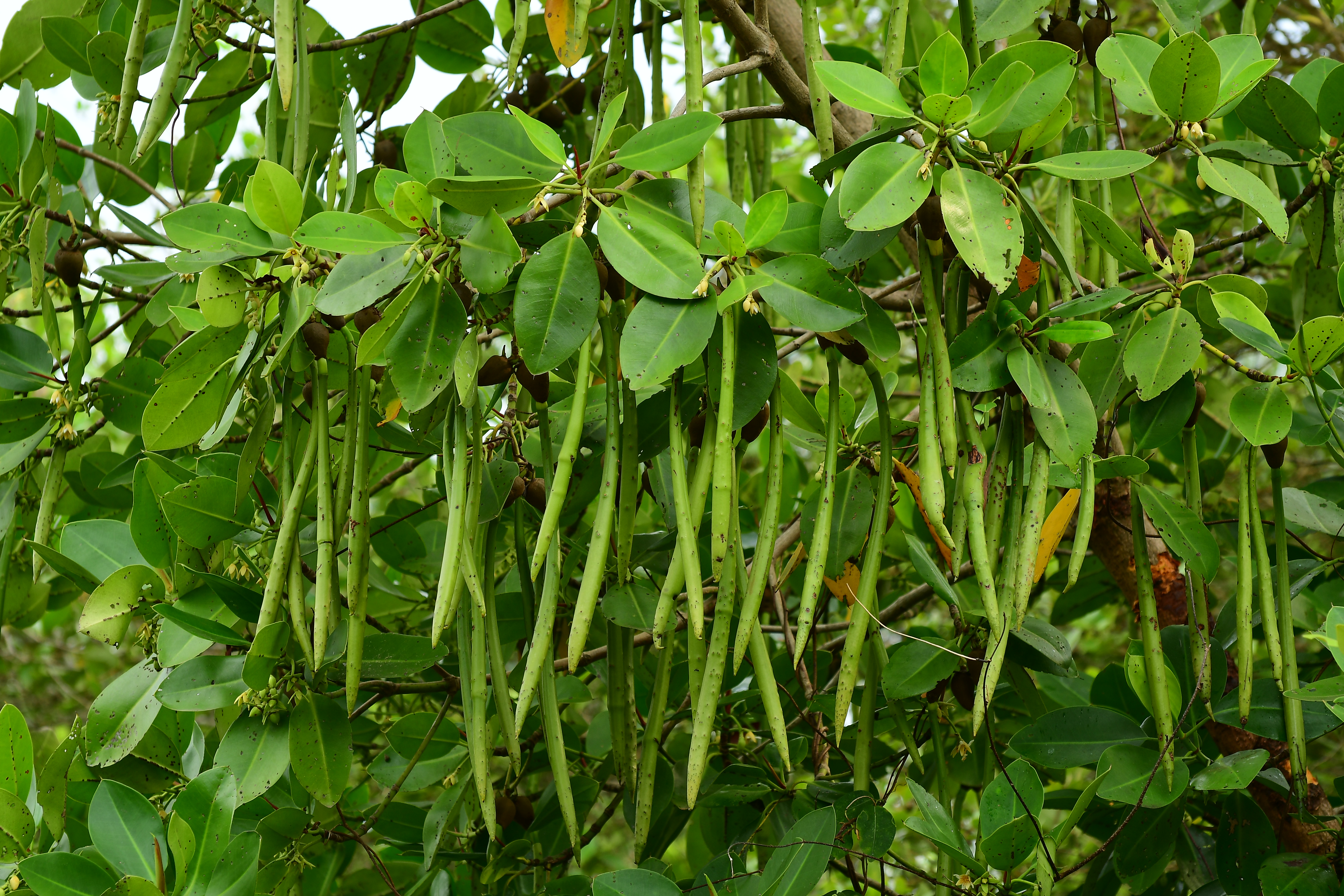
With propagules at Muzhappilangad

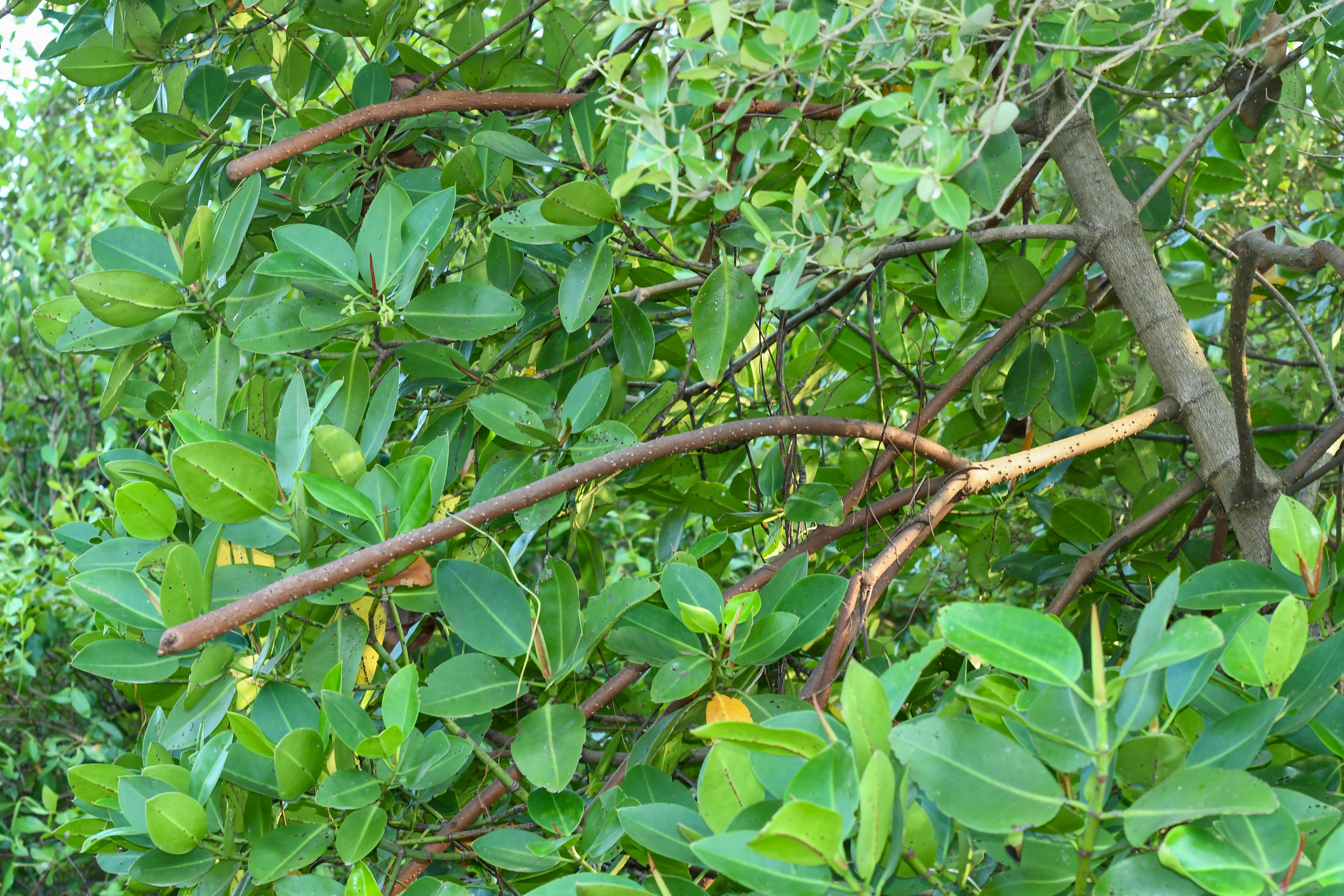
Aerial stilt roots

Rhizophora mucronata is a small to medium size evergreen tree growing to a height of about 20 to 25 metres (66 to 82 ft) on the banks of rivers. On the fringes of the sea 10 or 15 metres (33 or 49 ft) is a more typical height. The tallest trees are closest to the water and shorter trees are further inland. The tree has a large number of aerial stilt roots buttressing the trunk. The leaves are elliptical and usually about 12 centimetres (4.7 in) long and 6 centimetres (2.4 in) wide. They have elongated tips but these often break off. There are corky warts on the pale undersides of the leaves. The flowers develop in axillary clusters on the twigs. Each has a hard cream-coloured calyx with four sepals and four white, hairy petals. The seeds are viviparous and start to develop whilst still attached to the tree. The root begins to elongate and may reach a length of a metre (yard) or more. The propagule then becomes detached from the branch when sufficiently well developed to root in the mud below.

== Distribution and habitat ==
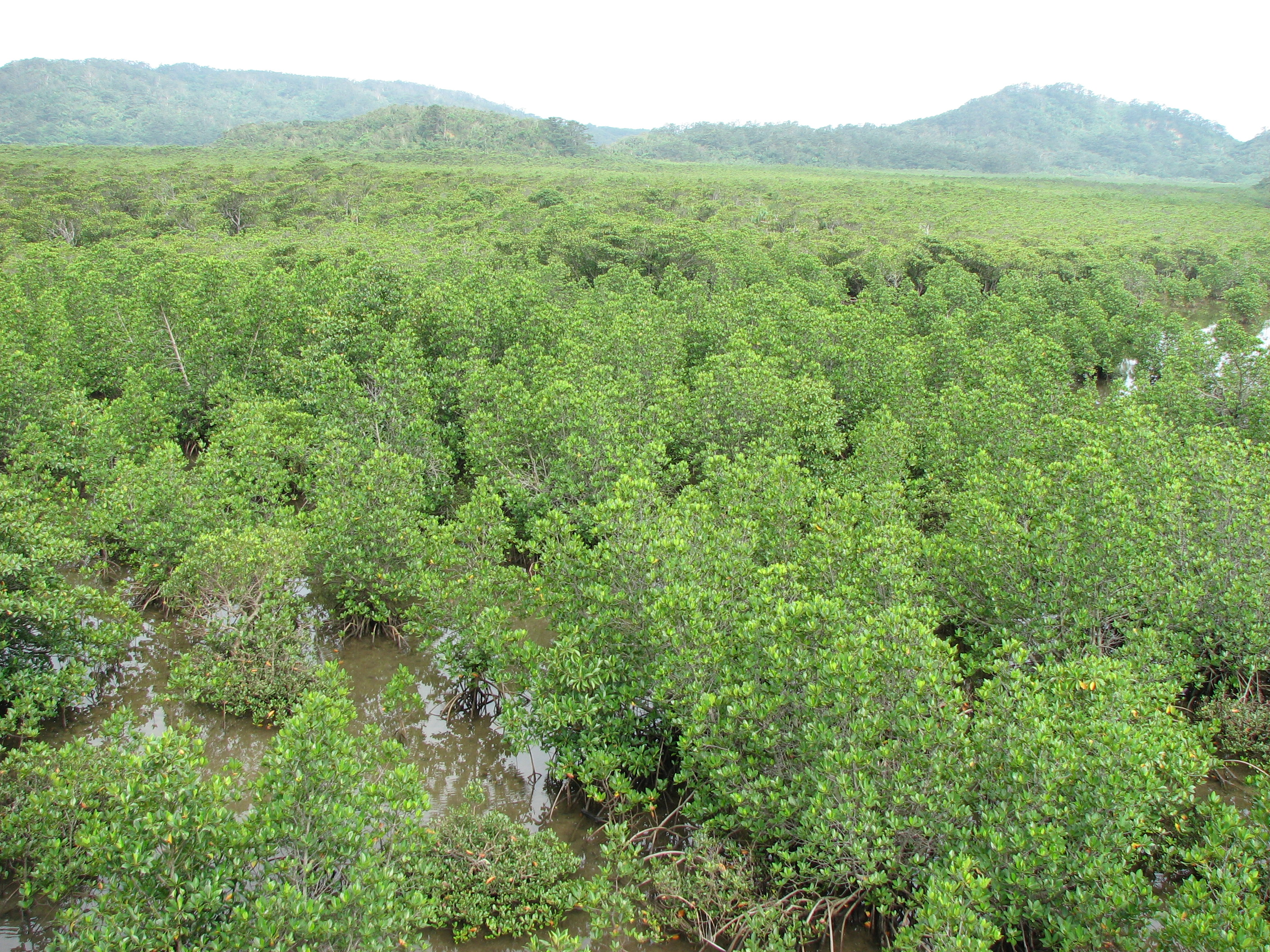
Growing on Iriomote Island, Japan

Rhizophora mucronata is found in the Indo-Pacific region on the banks of rivers and on the edge of the sea. It is the only mangrove species to be found in East Africa. R. mucronata is native to Africa (in southeastern Egypt; eastern Ethiopia; eastern Kenya; Madagascar; Mauritius; Mozambique; the Seychelles; Somalia; eastern side of South Africa down to Nahoon the southernmost mangrove forest in Africa; southeastern Sudan; and eastern Tanzania); Asia (in Burma; Cambodia; India; Pakistan; Iran; Indonesia; the Ryukyu Islands of Japan; Malaysia; Papua New Guinea; the Philippines; Sri Lanka; Taiwan; Thailand; and Vietnam) the South Pacific (in the Solomon Islands; and Vanuatu) and Australia (in northern Northern Territory; and northern Queensland).

The natural habitat of Rhizophora mucronata is estuaries, tidal creeks and flat coastal areas subject to daily tidal flooding. It seems to be more tolerant of inundation than other mangrove species and often forms an evergreen fringe to mangrove areas. It sometimes occurs as a pure stand or may grow with Rhizophora apiculata. The red mangrove is a protected tree in South Africa.

== Ecology ==
Rhizophora mucronata regenerates easily from seed but the seedlings are often damaged by crabs. The leaves are also eaten by crabs and form part of the diet of the crab-eating macaque (Macaca irus). The tree is attacked by the beetle Poecilus fallax. In the Mangalavanam Bird Sanctuary near Cochin, India, it grows in association with the mangrove Avicennia officinalis, the golden leather fern (Acrostichum aureum) and the sea holly (Acanthus ilicifolius).

== Uses ==
Rhizophora mucronata has multiple uses. It is used to help prevent coastal erosion and in restoration of mangrove habitats. The timber is used for firewood and in the construction of buildings, as poles and pilings, and in making fish traps. The fruits can be cooked and eaten or the juice extracted to make wine, and the young shoots can be consumed as a vegetable. The bark is used in tanning and a dye can be extracted from both bark and leaves. Various parts of the plant are used in folk medicine.

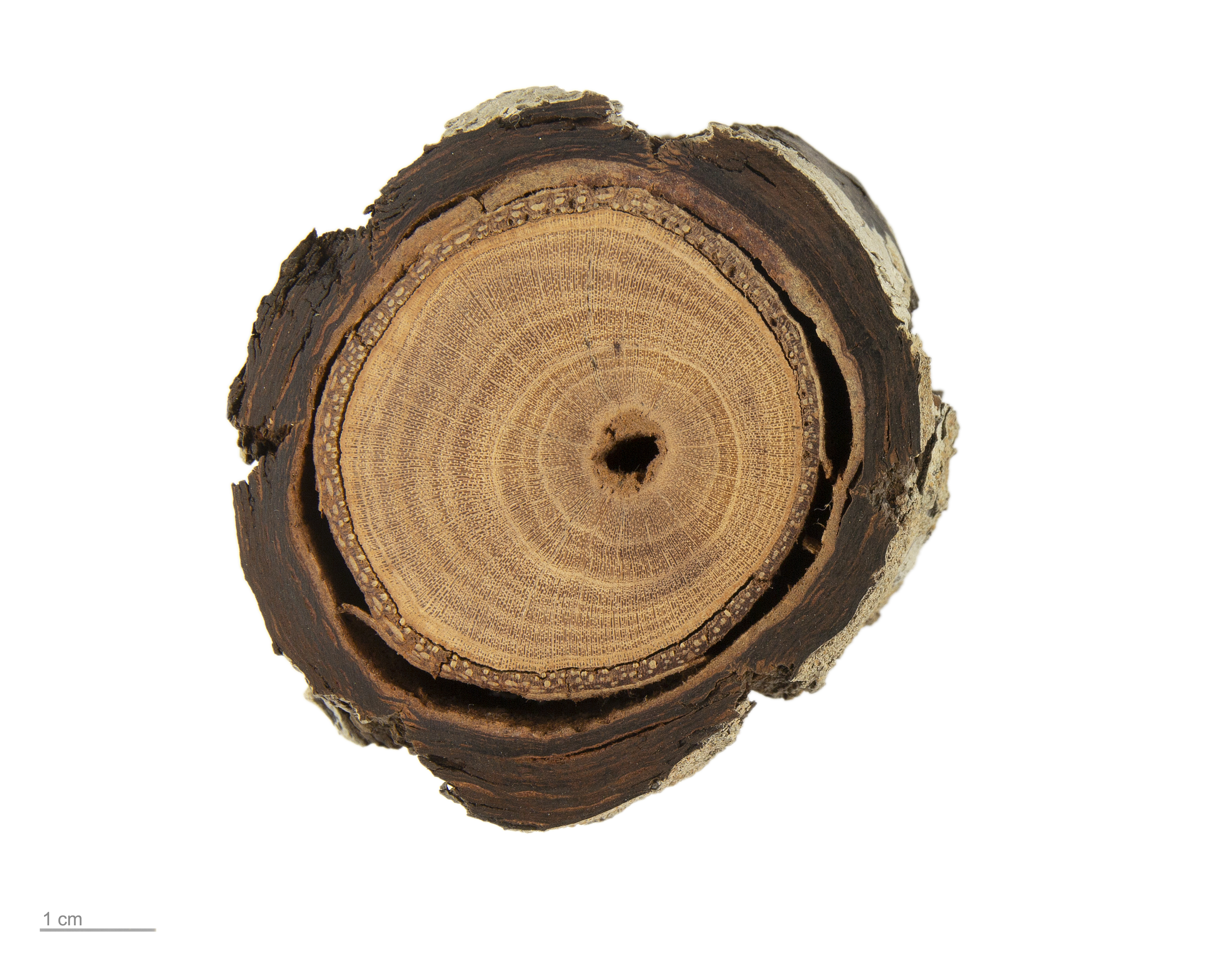
Rhizophora mucronata (MHNT)
