= Mangalavanam Bird Sanctuary =

Sanctuary in India

- IUCN category IV (habitat/species management area)
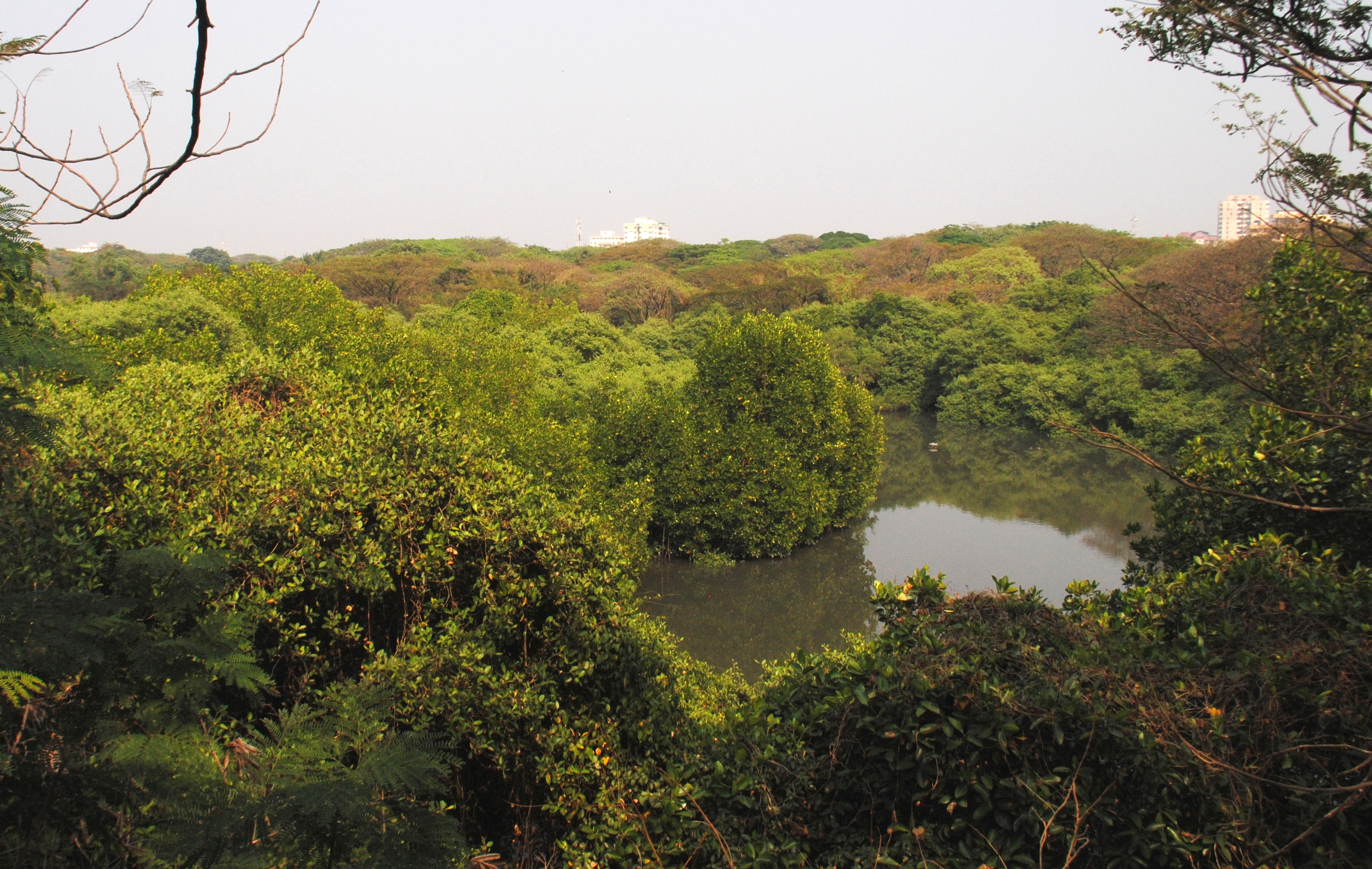
- View of Mangalavanam

- Location within Kerala Location within India
- Interactive map of Mangalavanam Bird Sanctuary
- Location: Kochi, Kerala, India
- Coordinates: 9°59′20″N 76°16′22″E
- Area: 0.0274 square kilometres (0.0106 sq mi)
- Established: 2004

Mangalavanam is an ecologically sensitive area situated at the centre of the Indian city of Kochi, covering about 2.74 hectares. It also houses a shallow tidal lake connected with Kochi backwaters by a canal. It is situated behind the Kerala High Court building and Ernakulam Terminus railway station. It is a nesting ground for a large variety of migratory birds and supports many types of mangroves. The Mangalavanam is often regarded as the "green lung of Kochi", considering its role in keeping the city's air pollution under check. The area is a roosting place for many kinds of resident and migratory birds.

Recently the high-rise buildings surrounding the area are curtailing the movement of birds in the sanctuary. The buildings close to the sanctuary interrupt proper orientation, take-off and landings of the birds. They also cause hurdles in the regular movements of the nesting birds in transporting nesting materials. It is also likely to hinder the movement of birds while bringing food materials to the chicks and fledglings. The administrative control of the sanctuary is with the Assistant Conservator of Forest and Wildlife Warden Mangalavanam Bird Sanctuary of Nature Study Centre Kalady and then to the Range Officer Research Range Kodanad.

== Flora and fauna ==
The true mangrove and mangrove associate species that exist in the sanctuary are Avicennia officinalis, Rhizophora mucronata, Acanthus ilicifolius and Acrostichum aureum— Although not threatened species according to IUCN Red List, they are of vital importance in estuarine ecosystems.

Mangalavanam is primarily a bird refuge. A bird survey conducted in May 2006 found that there were 194 birds belonging to 32 species. The total number of bird species recorded so far from the area is 72. Some of the birds found are common redshank, common greenshank, brahminy kite, white-breasted waterhen and marsh sandpiper.

In a recent study revealed six species of mammals Indian flying-fox, painted bat, three-striped palm squirrel/dusky palm squirrel, house rat/black rat, bandicota, and Eurasian otter. Two species of amphibians, Limnonectes limnocharis and Duttaphrynus melanostictus, and seven species of fishes Anabas testudineus, Striped panchax, Malabar swamp eel, Orange chromide, Blackline rasbora, Etroplus suratensis and Oreochromis mossambicus are found here.

During a study conducted in 2006, 17 species of butterflies were recorded in this area. 51 species of spiders belonging to 40 genera and 16 families were recorded here. This represented 27% of the total families reported from India.

== Gallery ==
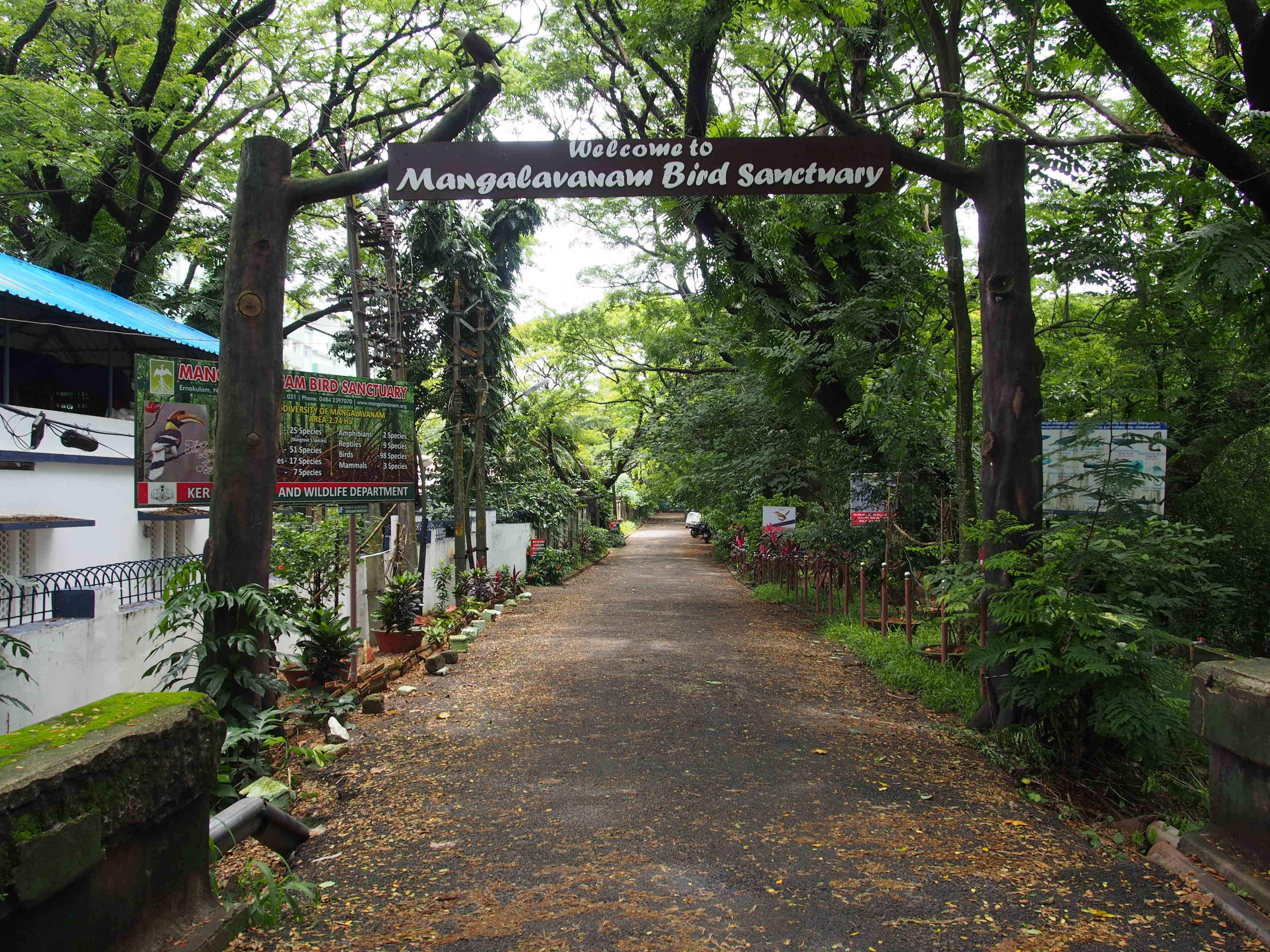
Welcome board on Dr. Salim Ali Road

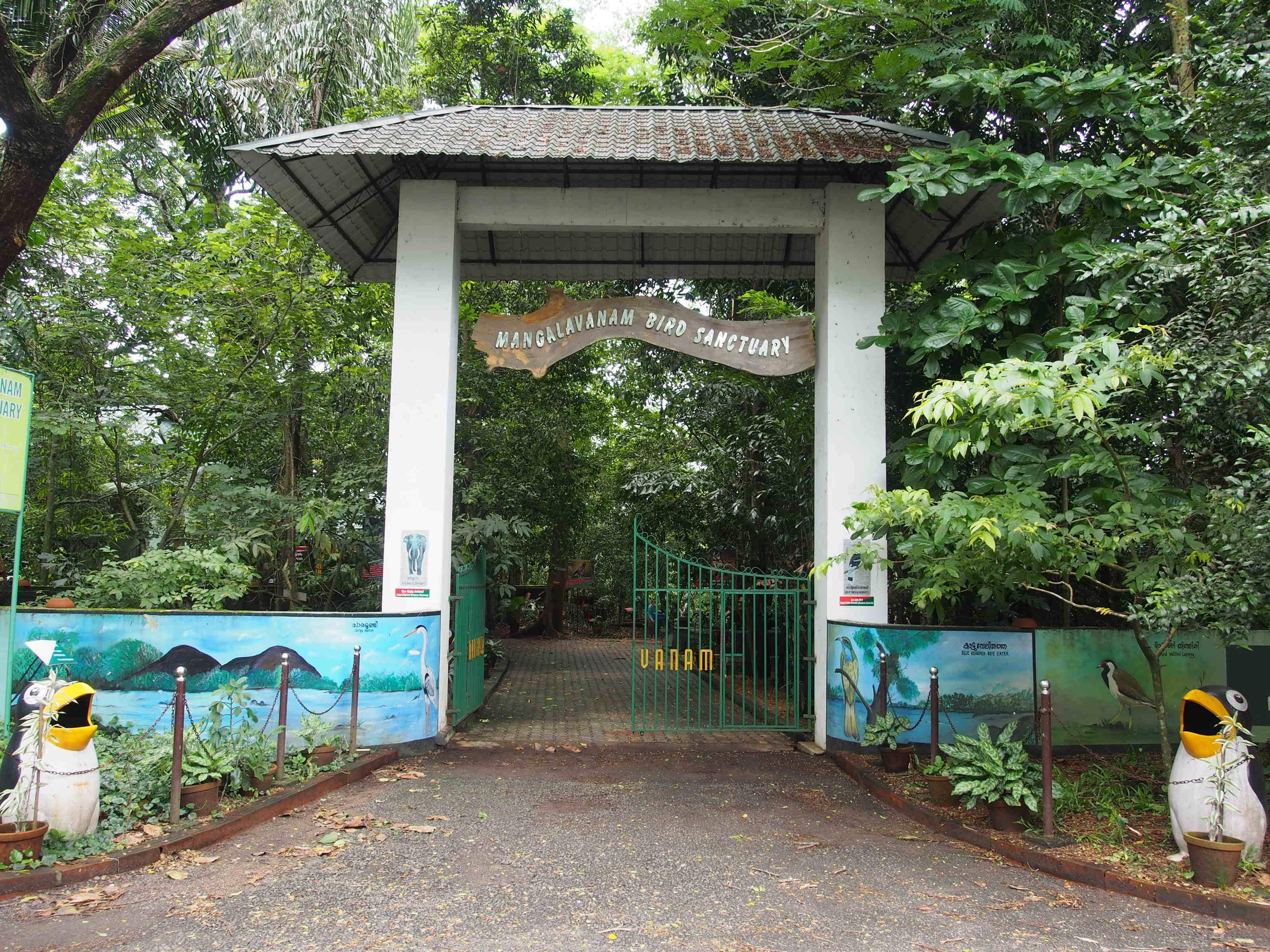
Entry gate

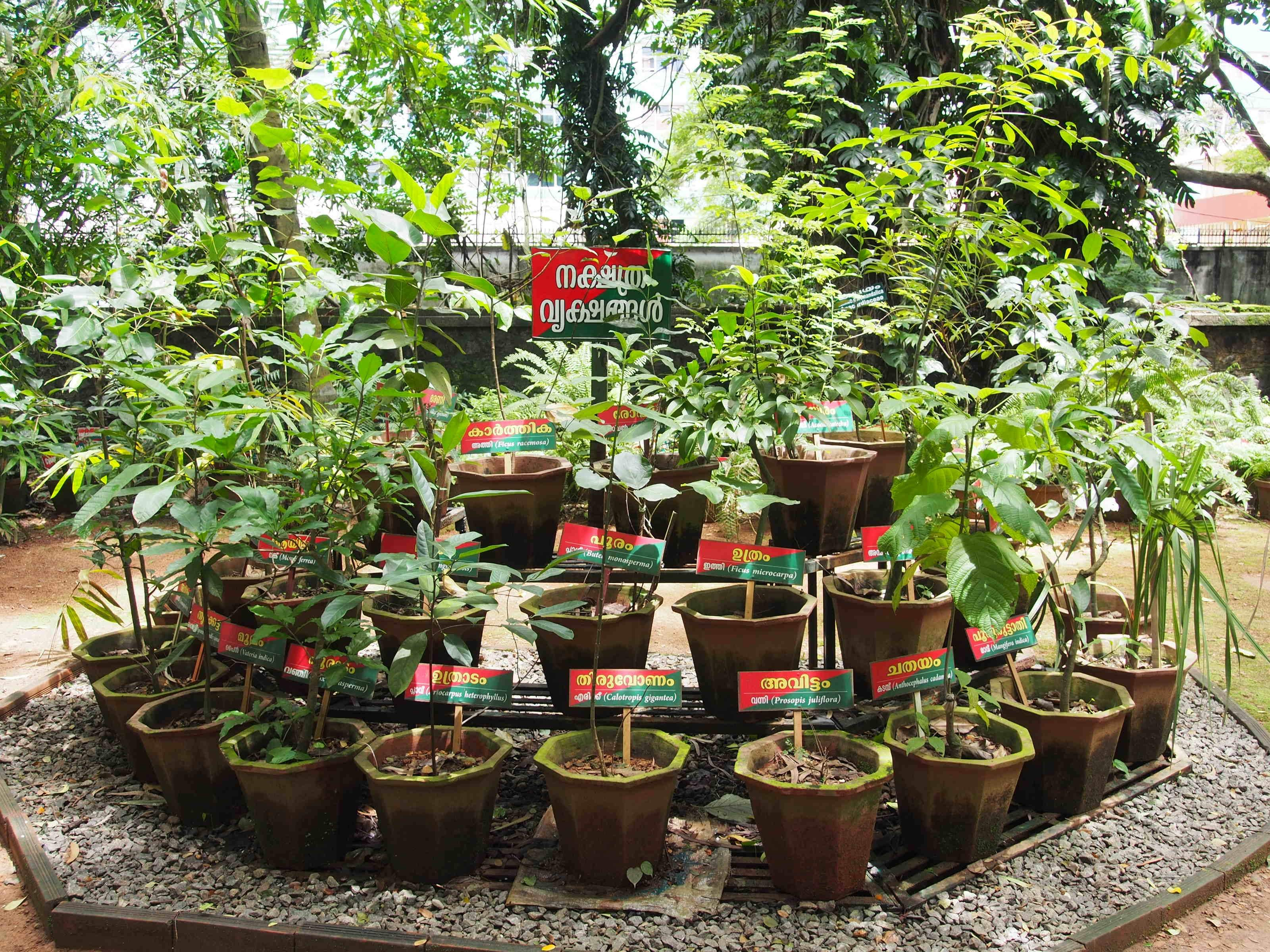
Nakshatravana

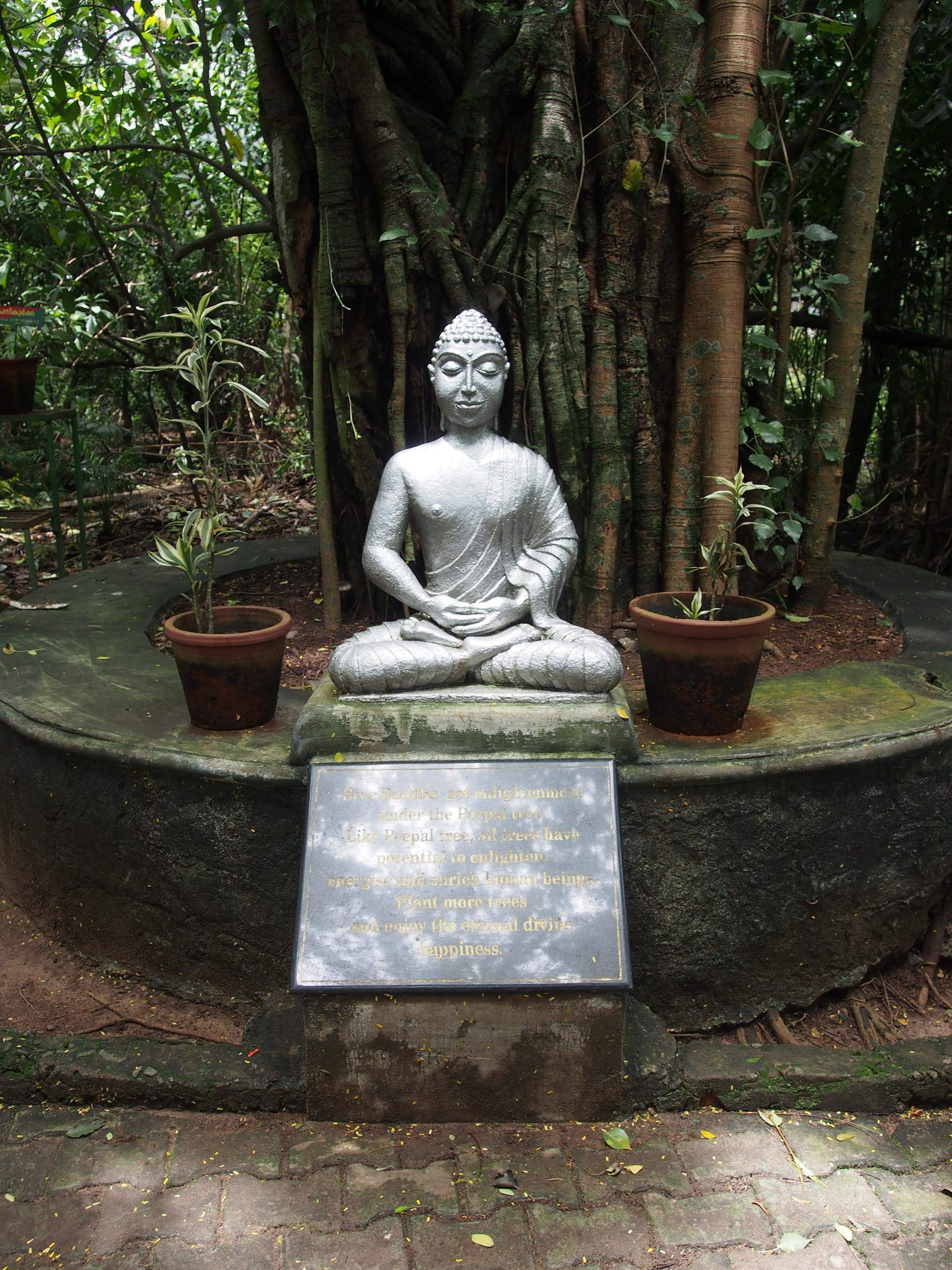
Statue of Buddha near the entry gate
