= Poecilips fallax =

Scientific classification
- Kingdom: Animalia
- Phylum: Arthropoda
- Clade: Pancrustacea
- Class: Insecta
- Order: Coleoptera
- Suborder: Polyphaga
- Infraorder: Cucujiformia
- Family: Curculionidae
- Genus: Poecilips
- Species: P. fallax

Binomial name
- Poecilips fallax Eggers, 1927

Species of beetle

Poecilips fallax is a small beetle of the subfamily Scolytinae. The beetle, related to carver beetles, is a pest of mangrove trees, especially Rhizophora mucronata and Rhizophora apiculata.

The adults oviposit or insert their eggs into the hypocotyls before the seed matures or drops to the mud below. When the eggs hatch, the larvae bore tunnels leading away from the oviposition site. These tunnels get longer and larger as the larve gets further. The larvae and adults feed on the content of the hypocotyl, distorting its shape and incapacitating it to germinate and eventually rot. When the larvae complete their growth, they pupate at the end of the tunnels and emerge through a round hole in the hypocotyl.
