= Avicennia integra =

Conservation status
- Vulnerable (IUCN 3.1)

Scientific classification
- Kingdom: Plantae
- Clade: Tracheophytes
- Clade: Angiosperms
- Clade: Eudicots
- Clade: Asterids
- Order: Lamiales
- Family: Acanthaceae
- Genus: Avicennia
- Species: A. integra

Binomial name
- Avicennia integra N.C.Duke

Species of plant

Avicennia integra is a species of tropical mangrove in the family Acanthaceae. It grows in coastal and estuarine locations in the Northern Territory, Australia.
