= Avicennia balanophora =

Scientific classification
- Kingdom: Plantae
- Clade: Tracheophytes
- Clade: Angiosperms
- Clade: Eudicots
- Clade: Asterids
- Order: Lamiales
- Family: Acanthaceae
- Genus: Avicennia
- Species: A. balanophora

Binomial name
- Avicennia balanophora Stapf & Moldenke

Species of plant

Avicennia balanaphora is a species of tropical mangrove in the family Acanthaceae. It is endemic to Queensland, Australia, where grows in coastal and estuarine locations.
