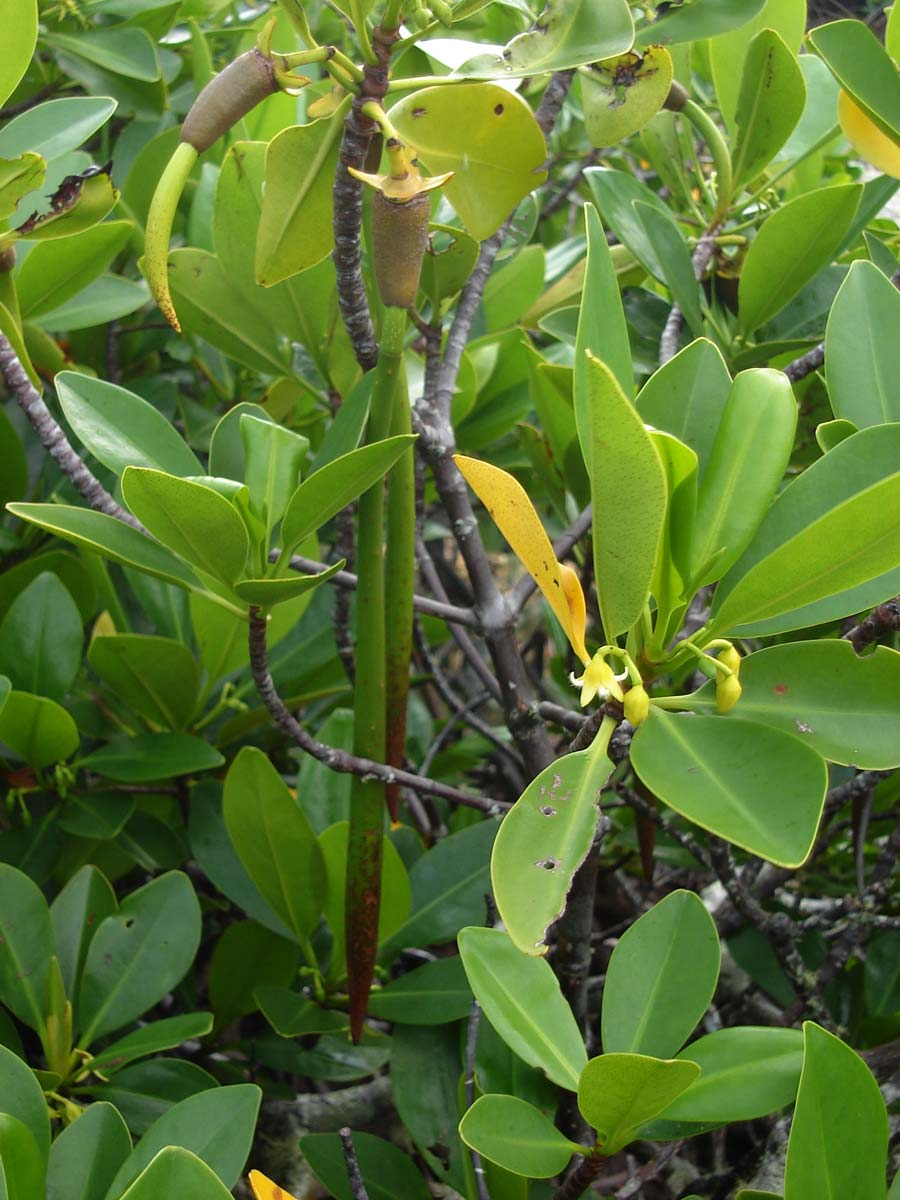
- Rhizophora mangle

Scientific classification
- Kingdom: Plantae
- Clade: Tracheophytes
- Clade: Angiosperms
- Clade: Eudicots
- Clade: Rosids
- Order: Malpighiales
- Family: Rhizophoraceae
- Genus: Rhizophora; L.

Species
- Several, see text

Synonyms
- Mangium Rumph. ex Scop.

= Rhizophora =

Rhizophora Temporal range: Cenomanian–Recent

Genus of trees

Rhizophora is a genus of tropical mangrove trees, sometimes collectively called true mangroves. The most notable species is the red mangrove (Rhizophora mangle) but some other species and a few natural hybrids are known. Rhizophora species generally live in intertidal zones which are inundated daily by the ocean. They exhibit a number of adaptations to this environment, including pneumatophores that elevate the plants above the water and allow them to respire oxygen even while their lower roots are submerged and a cytological molecular "pump" mechanism that allows them to remove excess salts from their cells. The generic name is derived from the Greek words ῥίζα (rhiza), meaning "root," and φορός (phoros), meaning "bearing," referring to the stilt-roots.

The beetle Poecilips fallax is a common pest of these trees, especially Rhizophora mucronata and Rhizophora apiculata. This beetle (related to carver beetles) lays its eggs in the hypocotyls. When they hatch, the larvae dig tunnels through the hypocotyl, distorting its shape, When the beetle pupates it leaves the plant, but the hypocotyl will no longer be able to develop normally.

The red mangrove is the state tree of Delta Amacuro in Venezuela; a dark brown dye can be produced from it, which is used in Tongan ngatu cloth production.

== Species ==
Image	Scientific name	Common name	Distribution
	Rhizophora apiculata Blume	bakauan lalaki (Philippines) bakau minyak	Australia (Queensland and the Northern Territory), Guam, India, Indonesia, Malaysia, Micronesia, New Caledonia, Papua New Guinea, the Philippines, Singapore, the Solomon Islands, Sri Lanka, Taiwan, the Maldives, Thailand, Vanuatu, and Vietnam.
	Rhizophora harrisonii Leechm.		Brazil, Cameroon, Colombia, Costa Rica, Ecuador, Guyana, French Guiana, Honduras, Nicaragua, Panama, Suriname, Trinidad, Tobago, and Venezuela.
	Rhizophora mangle L.	red mangrove	Tropical America, West Africa, Melanesia, Polynesia
	Rhizophora mucronata Lam.	loop-root mangrove, red mangrove or Asiatic mangrove	Africa (in southeastern Egypt; eastern Ethiopia; eastern Kenya; Madagascar; Mauritius; Mozambique; the Seychelles; Somalia; eastern side of South Africa down to Nahoon the southernmost mangrove forest in Africa; southeastern Sudan; and eastern Tanzania); Asia (in Burma; Cambodia; India; Pakistan; Iran; Indonesia; the Ryukyu Islands of Japan; Malaysia; Papua New Guinea; the Philippines; Sri Lanka; Taiwan; Thailand; and Vietnam) the South Pacific (in the Solomon Islands; and Vanuatu) and Australia (in northern Northern Territory; and northern Queensland)
	Rhizophora racemosa G.Mey.		Pacific coast of Central and South America, Atlantic coast of West Africa.
	Rhizophora samoensis (Hochr.) Salvoza	Samoan Mangrove	New Caledonia - Tonga - Samoa
	Rhizophora stylosa Griff.	spotted mangrove, bakauan bato (Philippines) Te tongo (Kiribati), Đâng (Vietnam)	Japan, China, Taiwan, Cambodia, Vietnam, Malesia and Australia (New South Wales and Queensland)

=== Hybrids ===
- Rhizophora × annamalayana Kathiresan (R. apiculata × R. mucronata)
- Rhizophora × lamarckii Montrouz. (R. apiculata × R. stylosa)
- Rhizophora × selala (Salvoza) P.B.Tomlinson (R. samoensis × R. stylosa)

=== Formerly placed here ===
- Aegiceras corniculatum (L.) Blanco (as R. corniculata L.)
- Bruguiera gymnorhiza (L.) Savigny (as R. gymnorhiza L.)
- Bruguiera parviflora (Roxb.) Wight & Arn. ex Griff. (as R. parviflora Roxb.)
- Bruguiera sexangula (Lour.) Poir. (as R. sexangula Lour.)
- Ceriops tagal (Perr.) C.B.Rob. (as R. tagal Perr.)

== See also ==
- Changes in global mangrove distributions
- Ecological values of mangrove
