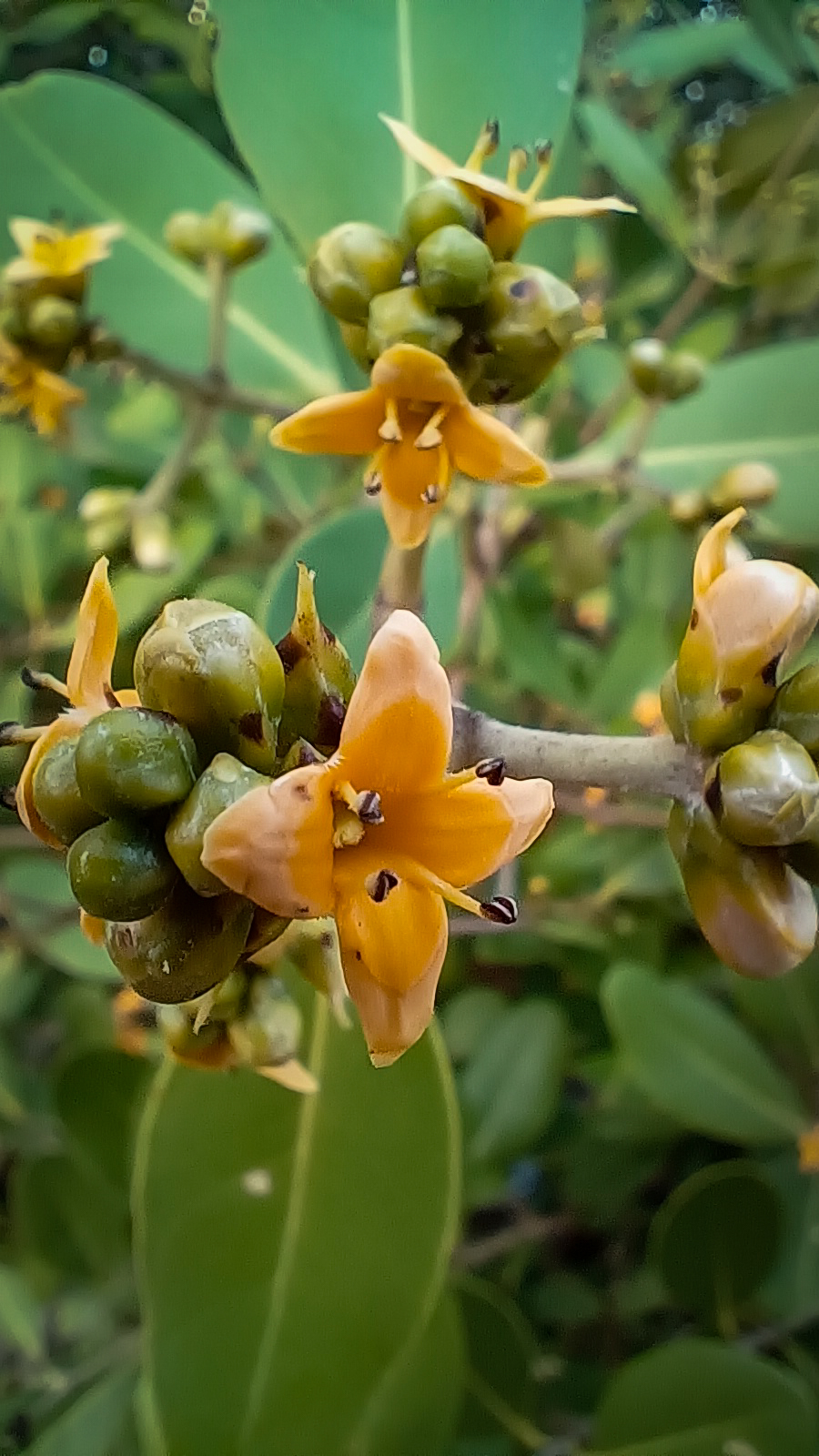
- Flowers of Avicennia officinalis (type species)
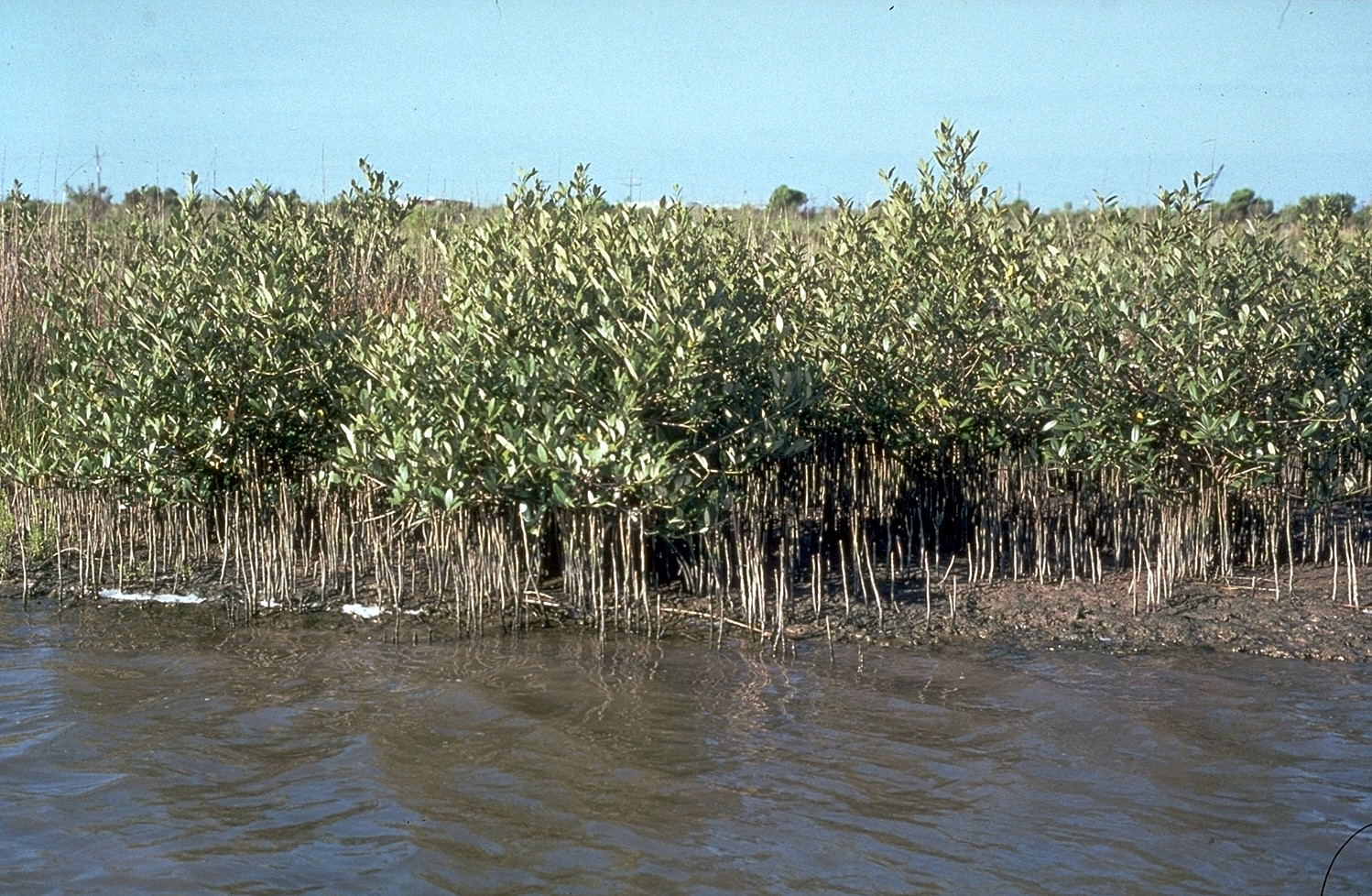
- Avicennia germinans

Scientific classification
- Kingdom: Plantae
- Clade: Tracheophytes
- Clade: Angiosperms
- Clade: Eudicots
- Clade: Asterids
- Order: Lamiales
- Family: Acanthaceae
- Subfamily: Avicennioideae; Miers
- Genus: Avicennia; L. (1753)

Species
- See text

Synonyms
- Bontia L. (1758), nom. illeg.; Halodendrum Thouars (1806); Hilairanthus Tiegh. (1898); Racka J.F.Gmel. (1791); Sceura Forssk. (1775); Upata Adans. (1763)

= Avicennia =

Genus of flowering plants

Avicennia is a genus of flowering plants currently placed in the bear's breeches family, Acanthaceae. It contains mangrove trees, which occur in the intertidal zones of estuarine areas and are characterized by its "pencil roots", which are aerial roots. They are also commonly known as api api, which in the Malay language means "fires", a reference to the fact that fireflies often congregate on these trees. Species of Avicennia occur worldwide south of the Tropic of Cancer.

The taxonomic placement of Avicennia is contentious. In some classifications, it has been placed in the family Verbenaceae, but more recently has been placed by some botanists in the monogeneric family Avicenniaceae. Recent phylogenetic studies have suggested that Avicennia is derived from within Acanthaceae, and the genus is included in that family in the Angiosperm Phylogeny Group system.

Designation of species is made difficult by the great variations in form of Avicennia marina. Between eight and 10 species are usually recognised, with A. marina further divided into a number of subspecies.

The generic name honours Persian physician Avicenna (980–1037).

== Description ==
Members of the genus are among the most salt-tolerant mangroves and are often the first to colonise new deposits of sediment. The sap is salty, and excess salt is secreted through the leaves. The spreading root system provides stability in shifting substrates. Vertical roots called pneumatophores project from the mud, thus the term "pencil roots". These are used in gas exchange as very little oxygen is available in the mud. The flowers are fragrant and rich in nectar, and are pollinated by insects. The embryos exhibit cryptovivipary, a process where they start to develop before the seed is shed, but do not break through the outside of the fruit capsule.

== List of species ==
Eight species are currently accepted:

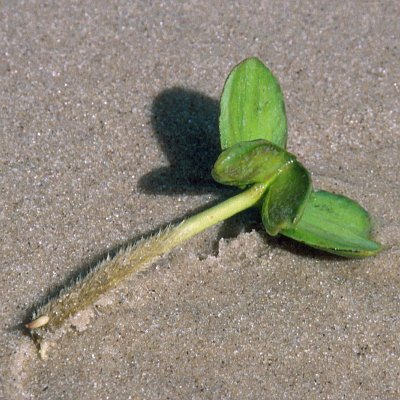
Propagule of Avicennia sp.

- Avicennia alba Blume
- Avicennia balanophora Stapf & Moldenke
- Avicennia bicolor Standl.
- Avicennia germinans (L.) L.
- Avicennia integra N.C.Duke
- Avicennia marina (Forssk.) Vierh.
  - A. m. subsp. australasica (Walp.) J.Everett
  - A. m. subsp. eucalyptifolia (Valeton) J.Everett
  - A. m. subsp. marina
  - A. m. var. rumphiana (Hallier f.) Bakh. (syn Avicennia lanata Ridl. and Avicennia rumphiana Hallier f.
- Avicennia officinalis L.
- Avicennia schaueriana Stapf & Leechm. ex Moldenke
