= Rhizophora samoensis =

Scientific classification
- Kingdom: Plantae
- Clade: Tracheophytes
- Clade: Angiosperms
- Clade: Eudicots
- Clade: Rosids
- Order: Malpighiales
- Family: Rhizophoraceae
- Genus: Rhizophora
- Species: R. samoensis

Binomial name
- Rhizophora samoensis (Hochr.) Salvoza

Synonyms
- Rhizophora mangle var. samoensis Hochr.

Species of mangrove

Rhizophora samoensis is a species of mangrove tree in the family Rhizophoraceae. It is native to the southwestern Pacific, where it occurs in Fiji, New Caledonia, Samoa, Tonga, Vanuatu, and Wallis and Futuna.

== Taxonomy ==
The taxon was originally described by Swiss botanist Bénédict Pierre Georges Hochreutiner in 1925 as Rhizophora mangle var. samoensis. In 1936, Filipino botanist Felipe Modesto Salvoza published the combination Rhizophora samoensis (Hochr.) Salvoza in the Natural and Applied Science Bulletin of the University of the Philippines.

The taxonomic treatment of R. samoensis has varied. A 2013 genetic study found that R. samoensis could not be distinguished from Pacific populations of R. mangle using the nuclear and chloroplast markers examined. The authors supported the hypothesis that the two represented the same species, while noting that further examination of morphological characters was needed before changing their taxonomic status.

In 2023, Xavier Cornejo and Carmita Bonifaz argued for the reinstatement of R. samoensis as a distinct species, based on morphological evidence and previously published molecular studies. Plants of the World Online accepts R. samoensis as a distinct species.
