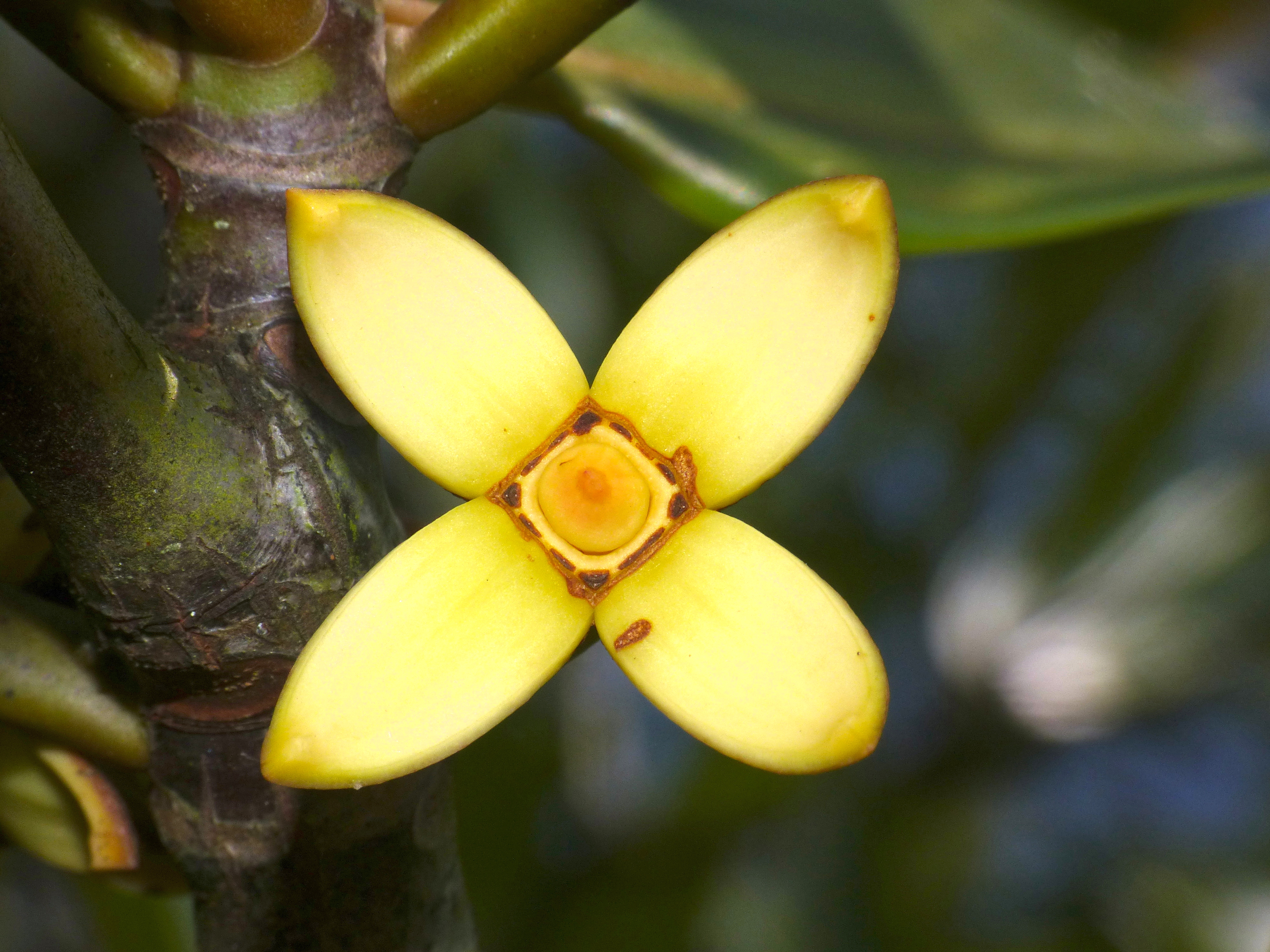
- Flower

Conservation status
- Least Concern (IUCN 3.1)

Scientific classification
- Kingdom: Plantae
- Clade: Embryophytes
- Clade: Tracheophytes
- Clade: Spermatophytes
- Clade: Angiosperms
- Clade: Eudicots
- Clade: Rosids
- Order: Malpighiales
- Family: Rhizophoraceae
- Genus: Rhizophora
- Species: R. apiculata

Binomial name
- Rhizophora apiculata Blume

= Rhizophora apiculata =

Tall-stilt mangrove

Species of tree

The tall-stilt mangrove (Rhizophora apiculata) is a species of flowering plant distributed throughout Southeast Asia and the western Pacific islands.

It is located exclusively in the mangrove ecosystem due to an affinity to wet, muddy and silty sediments. Due to the high salt concentrations of the soils in these environments, it has mechanisms (ultrafiltration) in place to reduce the likely impacts associated with increased salt in plant physiology (drying plant material down causing increased evapotranspiration). Rhizophora apiculata and R. mucronata are used to make charcoal in the charcoal kilns of Kuala Sepetang in Perak, Malaysia. Rhizophora apiculata is used within mangrove plantation specifically for wood, and charcoal production in many parts of Thailand.

There are alternative uses for R. apiculata, such as to reinforce nets, ropes and fishing lines, transform into charcoal or trade for income.

== Description ==
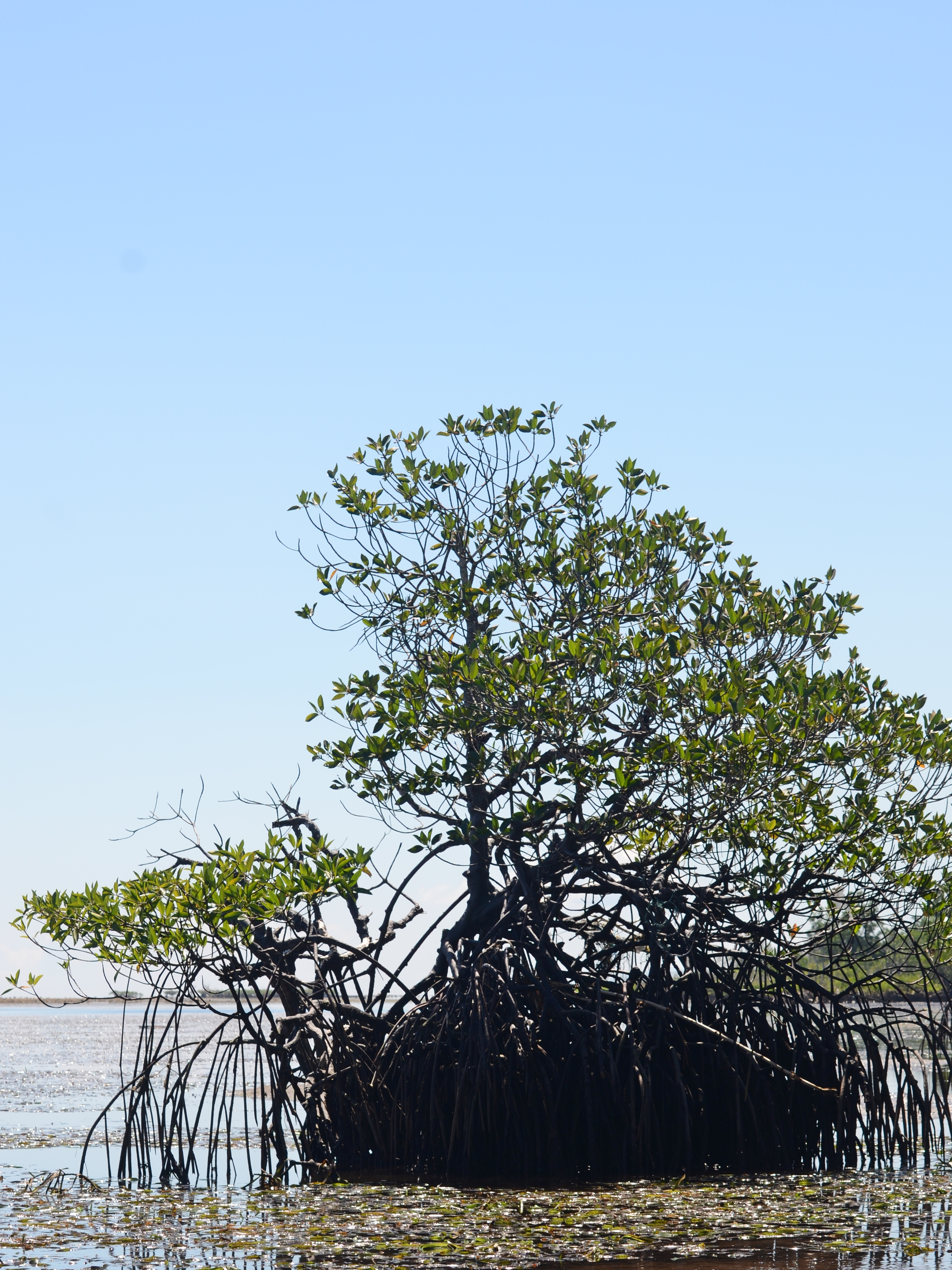
Rhizophora apiculata - Manado

The shrub size depends on geographical factors (climate and soil specifically). On average a mature R. apiculata shrub reaches between 5–8 metres in height although it has the potential to reach up to 30–40 metres.

=== Trunk ===
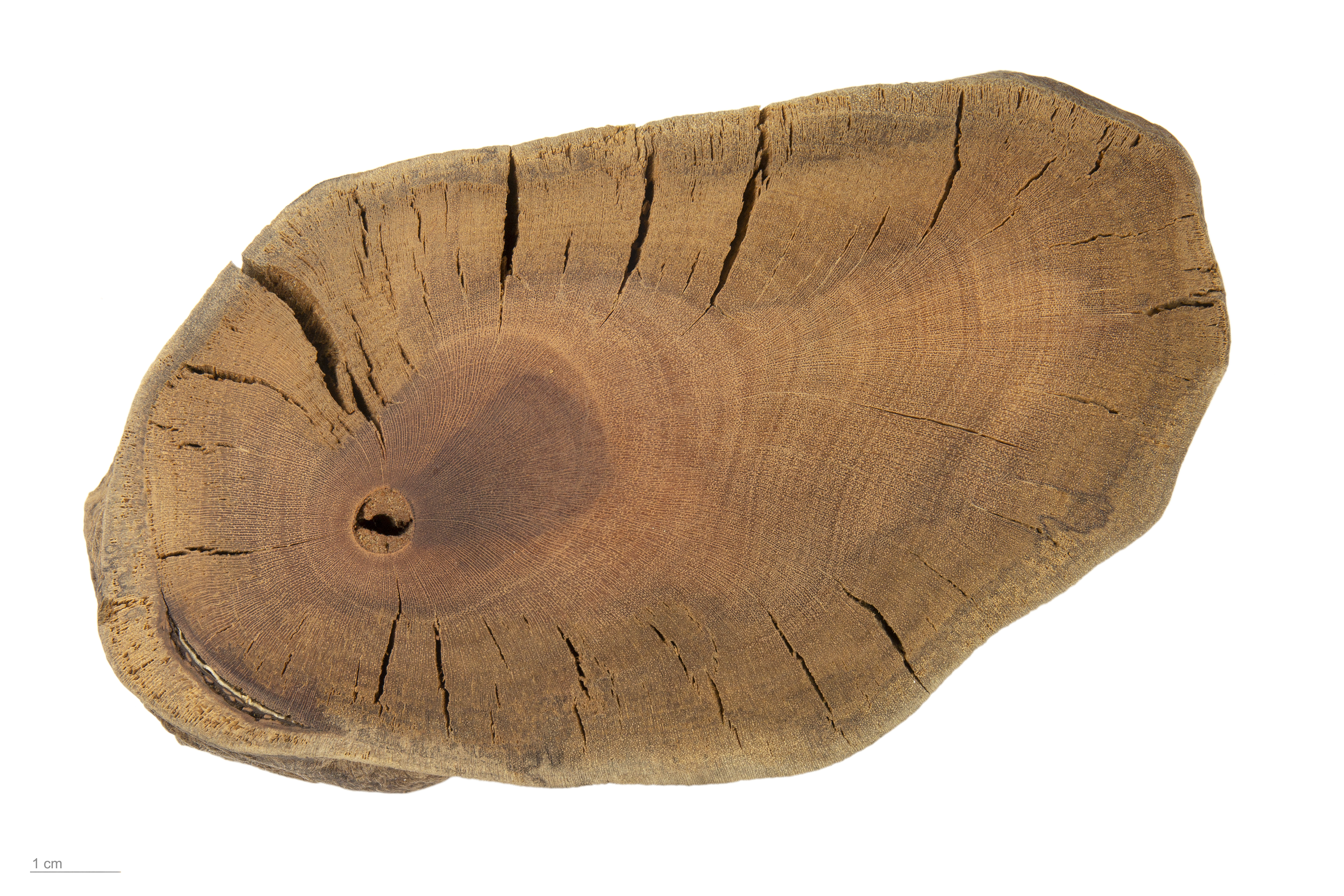
Rhizophora apiculata (MHNT)

The dimensions of the trunk depend on the age of the plant. When mature, the diameter reach 50 cm, and is typically dark grey. The trunk size is highly dependent on the nutrients within the soil as they will be the underlying factor for growth since water is not usually a limiting factor in its habitats.

=== Leaves ===
The openings established by the cork warts enable a pathway for air to be trapped within the aerenchyma that is then stored. The air after being stored is heated by the sun causing the air to expand and enlarge the leaf. Aerenchyma in plants are integral for growth and functionality alongside enabling roots to function in 'oxygen deprived' (anoxic) substrates.

Differences in morphology between R. apiculata with vs. without cork warts can have an effect in light intake and growth potential. These differences were originally thought to be exclusive to R. apiculata. However, R. racemosa have also shown this trait. The distribution of R. apiculata plays a role in whether this adaptation will be present or not. Plants in regions north and west of the New Guinea coast have this trait, while south and east of the New Guinea coast do not.

=== Roots ===
R. apiculata has two types of adventitious roots; aerial prop roots and stilt roots. Both types of roots are an adaptation undertaken due to environmental factors, designed to withstand large waves, rough tides, strong winds and tropical storms. Roots have two main forces that govern the amount of water uptake potential. These include hydrostatic (which distributes the water taken up by the root to each of its organs) and osmotic force (using negative water pressure in the roots to suck up water from the soil).

=== Aerial prop roots ===
Due to the habitat in which R. apiculata occurs, the roots possess a special trait designed to anchor the plant to the soil. It still acts as a normal root responsible for the uptake of both water and nutrients, with the difference being it descends from the branches. Aerial roots anchor the plant to the soil in this case due to the soil being heavily saturated with water, movement of the plant without aerial prop roots will lead to the plant being uprooted (separation from the soil leading to plant death).

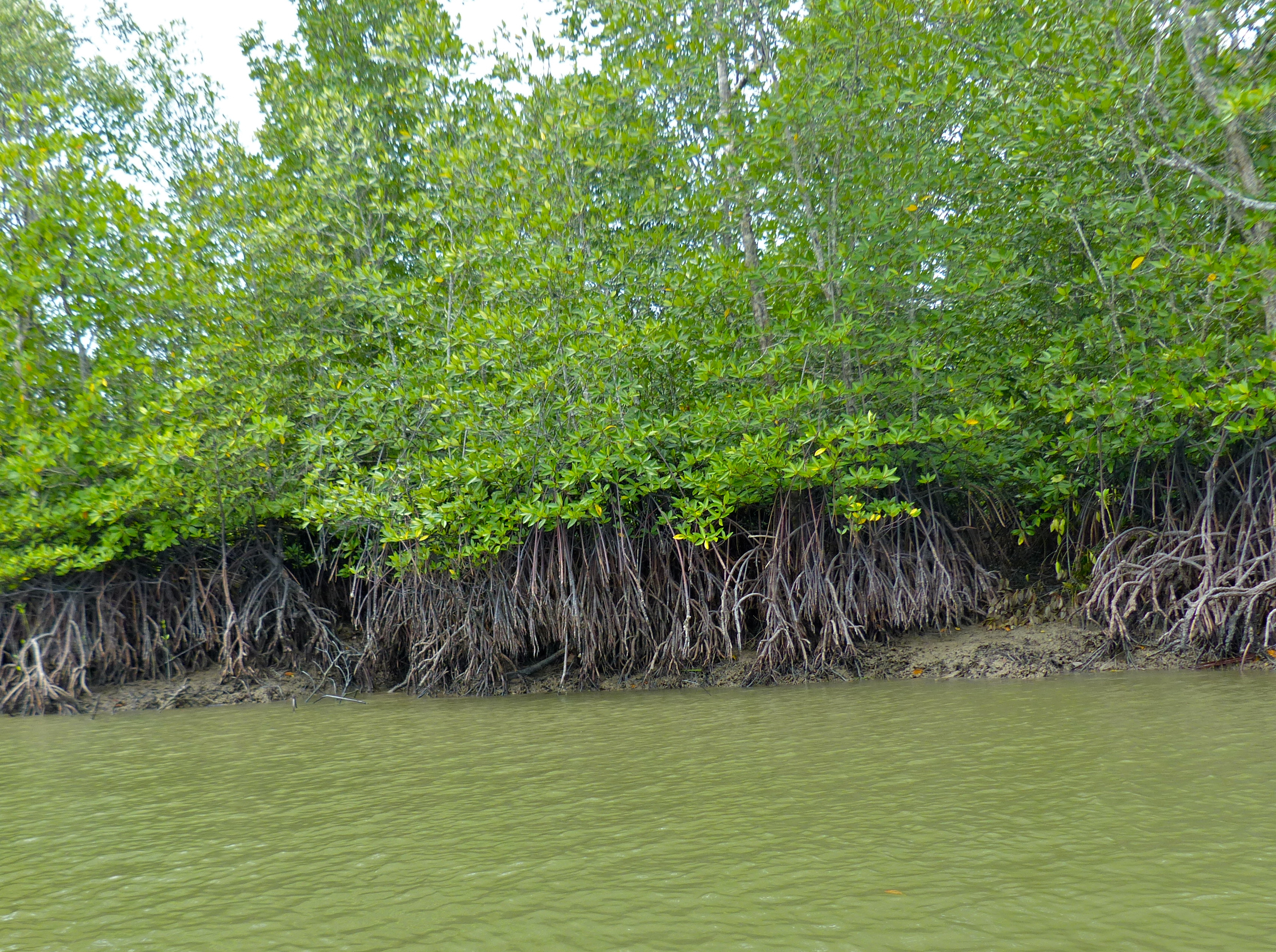
Tall-stilt mangroves (R. apiculata)

=== Stilt roots ===
R. apiculata has stilt roots that act as an additional support and anchor. The location of the R. apiculata will determine the type of effect placed onto the stilt root. For instance, if the stilt root grows downward and finds water, then it will continuously grow downwards until reaching soil from the ocean floor. If the stilt root reaches soil first it will grow underground expanding the root system then grows additional stilt roots from the original that grew unilaterally upwards. This process is necessary for the plant to increase carbon sequestration alongside providing additional stability from being uprooted. Including R. apiculata there are a variety of mangrove plants that possess stilt roots, for instance R. mucronata, and R. stylosa.

=== Ultra-filtration ===
The process of roots absorbing both water and nutrients is fundamental for growth, however due to the environment in which R. apiculata grows, being notably high in salt levels, the roots undergo a process called ultra-filtration to eliminate salt from entering the plant. However, any salt taken up will be stored in old leaves that will eventually fall and die eliminating the salt capacity within the plant.

== Distribution and habitat ==
=== Habitat ===
R. apiculata is found within the mangrove ecosystem; a unique and complex location known for its humid climate, saline environment, waterlogged soils and capable of tolerating salinity ranging from 2-90%.

=== Soil ===
The habitat of R. apiculata is the mangroves for which there are common similarities among all mangroves around the world. These include; saline, anoxic, acidic and frequently waterlogged conditions for which the majority of nutrients are brought in via tidal inundation (the use of waves and water movement to move sediments thus supplying nutrients).

=== Environmental impacts ===
There is currently a positive correlation between R. apiculata and improving water quality through "filtration, adsorption, co-sedimentation, absorption, and microbial decomposition". As a result of water quality improvement, the likelihood of diseases caused by bacteria, parasites, fungi, and environmental pressure impacting both flora and fauna will be reduced. Microbiota may reduce the numbers of mud crab exponentially which are a key driver within the mangrove ecosystem.

=== Biodiversity impacts ===
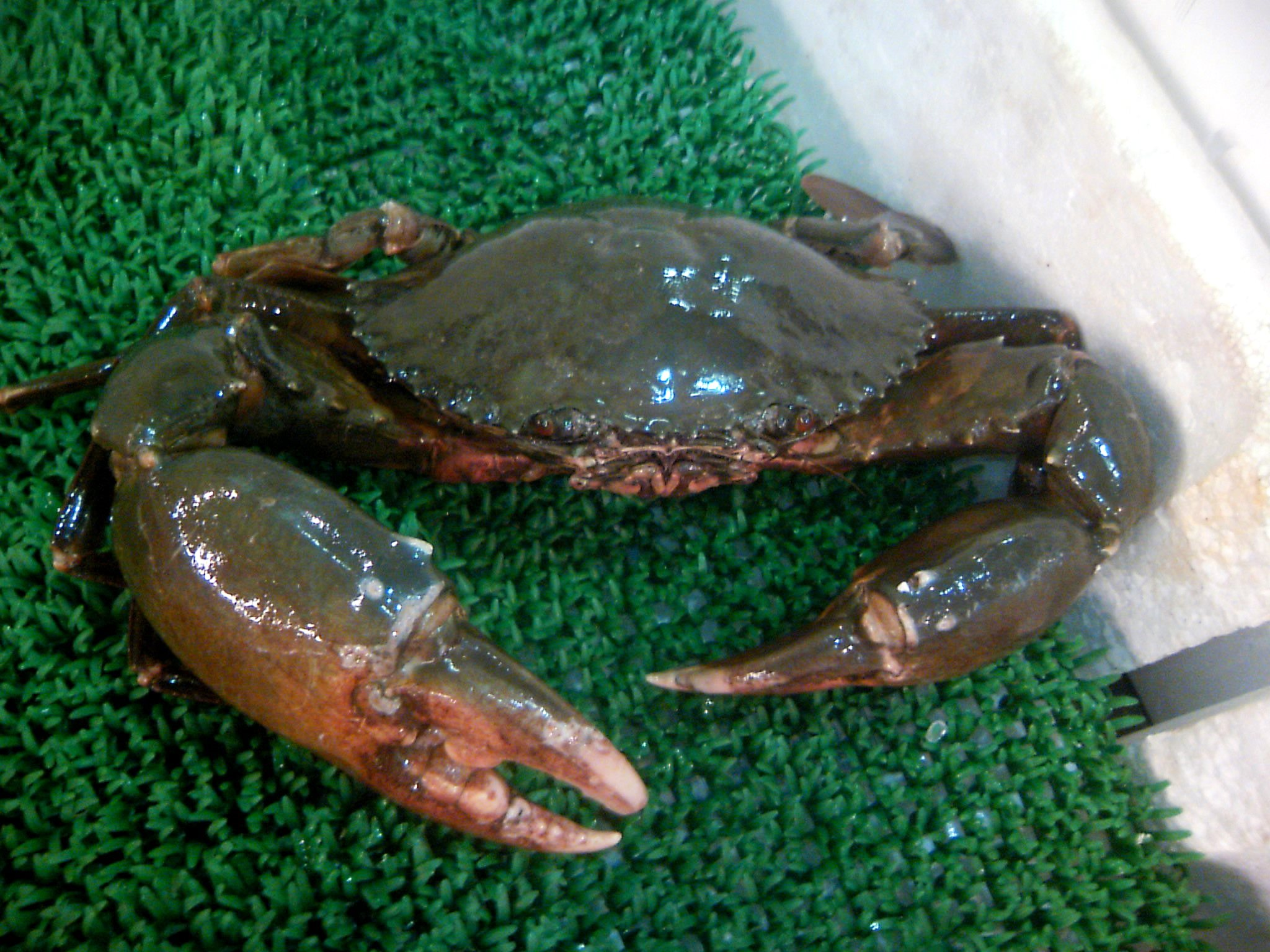
Mangrove mud crab

This species impacts the aquatic animals positively as Dai et al. (2020) deduced that R. apiculata is able to change the composition of mud crab gut microbiota. This change will lead to the mud crab living longer and healthier with an added effect being on the crustacean's weight. This could in turn positively influence the marine life in which it resides.

=== Distribution ===
R. apiculata is primarily located on the equatorial tropical landscapes including tropical Asia, Pakistan, Vietnam, Hainan, Malaysia and Northern Australia.

=== Seed dispersal ===
R. apiculata undertakes reproduction through two methods; viviparity and wind dispersal. Viviparity occurs when the embryo grows through the seed coat whilst still attached to the plant prior to dropping into the water. Once dropped into water it will travel and if a suitable site for germination occurs it will establish itself. The other method for reproduction occurs as flowers are self-compatible and usually wind pollinated.

== Commercial uses ==
R. apiculata has a wide range of commercial uses due to its availability and quality of timber. Currently there are plantations preexisting that allow for R. apiculata to be farmed and transformed into charcoal; resulting in renewable energy alongside potential income sources.

== Rare hybrid ==
When bred with 'bakauan bato' (Rhizophora stylosa), the product is a rare hybrid species of mangrove, called "Rhizophora x lamarckii", which was discovered in April 2008, by Filipino scientists in Masinloc, Zambales. Only one tree was found on Panay Island in Western Visayas, while 12 were discovered in Masinloc, and they have an average diameter of 5.5 centimeters and height of 6 meters.

In the Maldives, Rhizophora apiculata is commonly mistaken by locals with Rhizophora mangle. This species of plant is only found in Huraa island of Kaafu Atoll.
