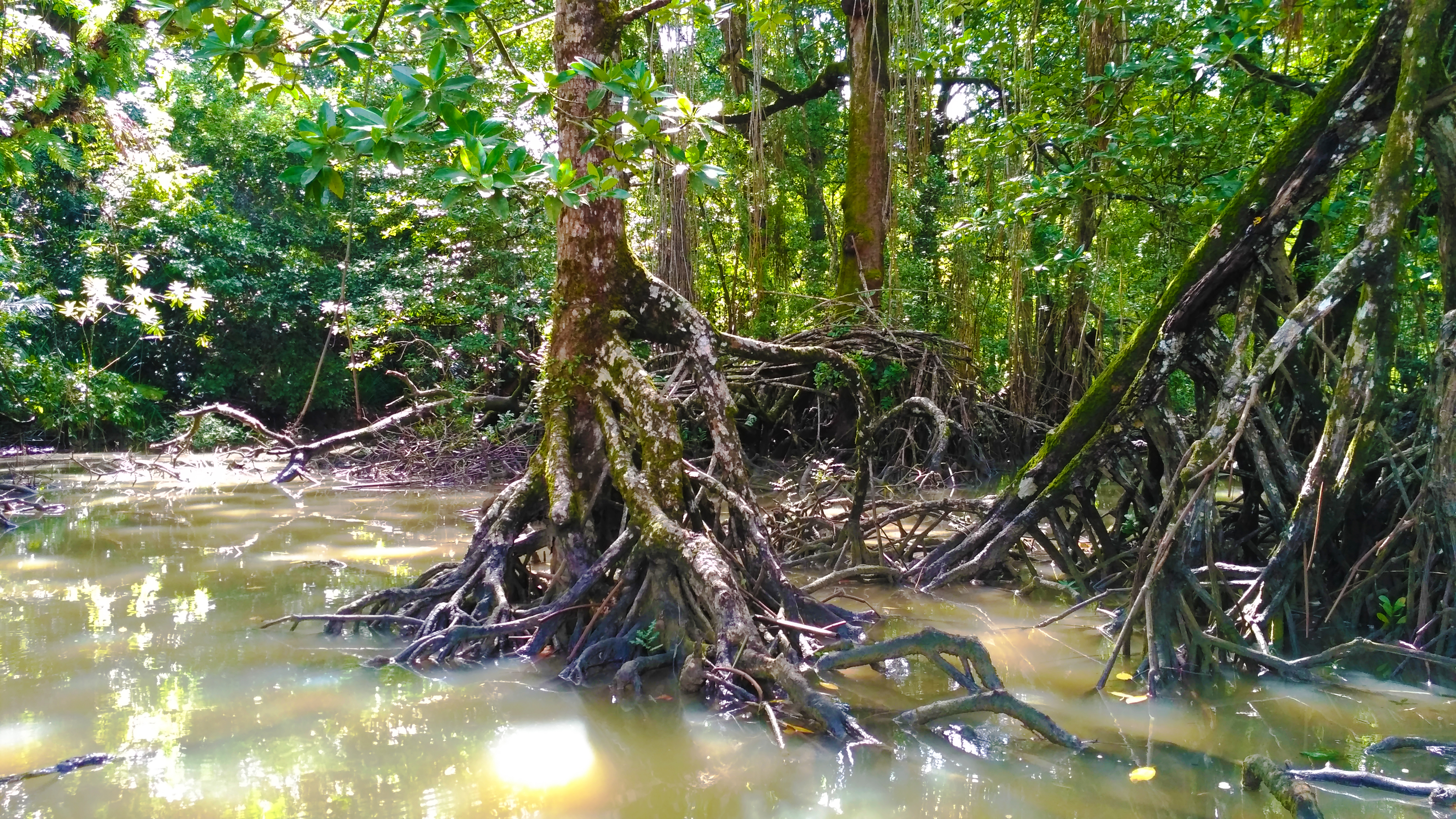
- In Ujung Kulon National Park, Java
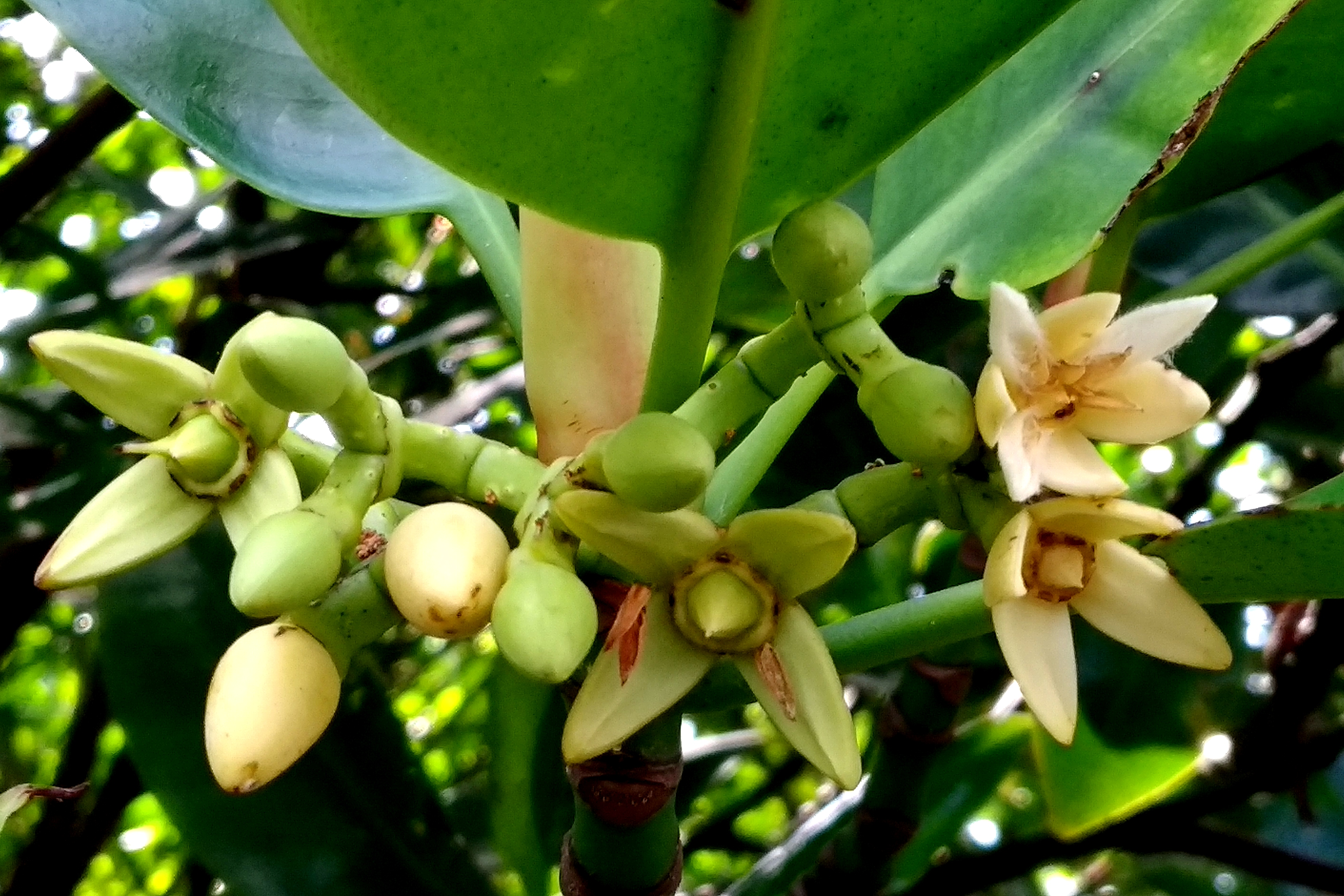

Conservation status
- Least Concern (IUCN 3.1)

Scientific classification
- Kingdom: Plantae
- Clade: Embryophytes
- Clade: Tracheophytes
- Clade: Spermatophytes
- Clade: Angiosperms
- Clade: Eudicots
- Clade: Rosids
- Order: Malpighiales
- Family: Rhizophoraceae
- Genus: Rhizophora
- Species: R. stylosa

Binomial name
- Rhizophora stylosa Griff.

Synonyms
- Rhizophora mucronata var. stylosa (Griff.) A.Schimp.

= Rhizophora stylosa =

Species of tree

Rhizophora stylosa, the spotted mangrove, red mangrove, small stilted mangrove or stilt-root mangrove, is a small to medium-sized evergreen tree in the family Rhizophoraceae. The specific epithet stylosa is from the Latin meaning 'stylus form', referring to the flower.

== Description ==
Rhizophora stylosa grows up to 15 metres (50 ft) tall with a trunk diameter of up to 25 centimetres (10 in). The bark is dark brown to black. The fruits are ovoid to pear-shaped and measure up to 4 cm (2 in) long.

== Distribution and habitat ==
Rhizophora stylosa grows naturally in Japan, China, Taiwan, Cambodia, Vietnam, Malesia, Australia (New South Wales and Queensland) and many areas of the Pacific. Its habitat is sandy beaches and coral terraces on seashores.
