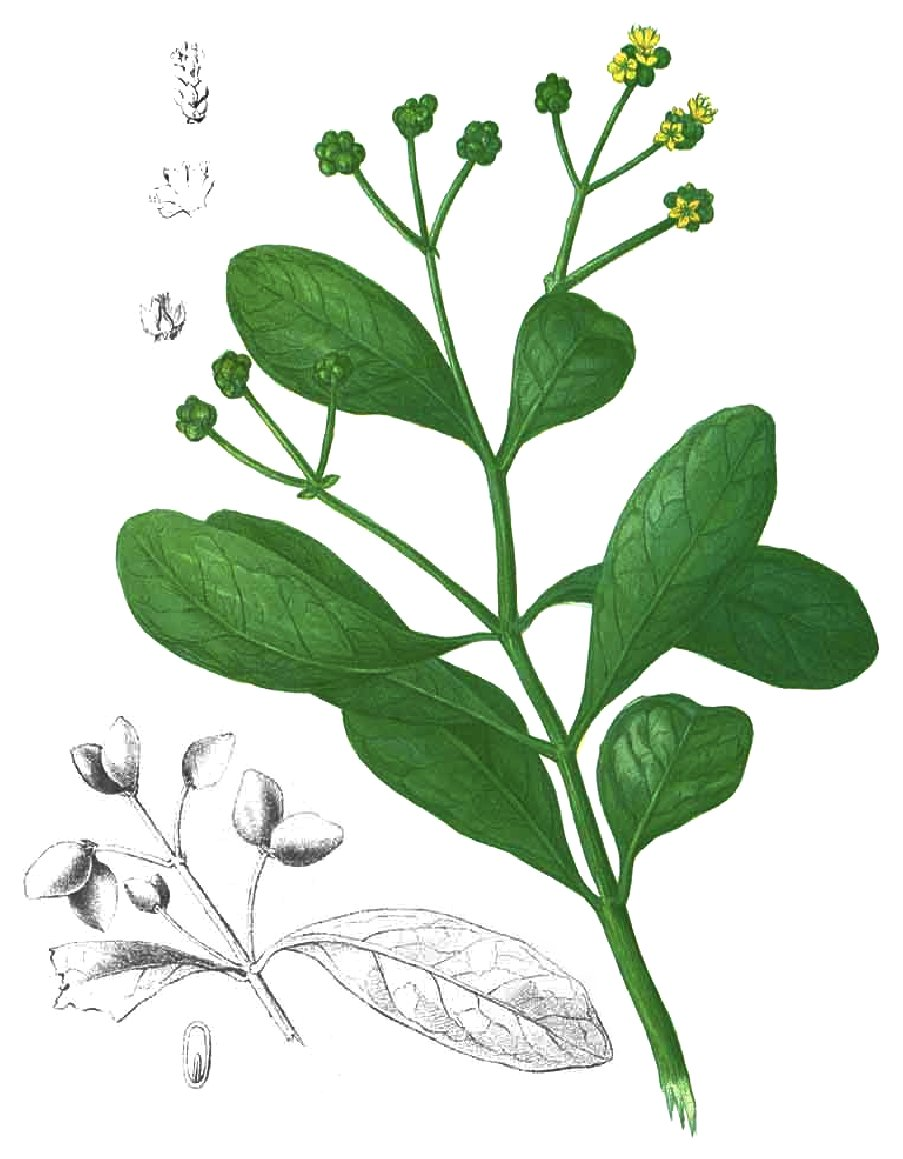
- Indian mangrove

Conservation status
- Least Concern (IUCN 3.1)

Scientific classification
- Kingdom: Plantae
- Clade: Tracheophytes
- Clade: Angiosperms
- Clade: Eudicots
- Clade: Asterids
- Order: Lamiales
- Family: Acanthaceae
- Genus: Avicennia
- Species: A. officinalis

Binomial name
- Avicennia officinalis L.

Synonyms
- Avicennia obovata Griff.; Avicennia oepata Buch.-Ham.; Avicennia officinalis var. acuminata Domin; Avicennia officinalis f. flaviflora Kuntze; Avicennia officinalis f. tomentosa Kuntze; Halodendrum thouarsii Roem. & Schult.; Racka ovata Roem. & Schult.; Racka torrida J.F.Gmel.

= Avicennia officinalis =

Species of flowering plant

Avicennia officinalis is a species of mangrove also known as Indian mangrove. The genus Avicennia is named after the famous Persian scientist Ibn Sina.

== Description ==
The young tree forms a low, dense bushy crown. When it matures, it forms a columnar tree up to 15 m and may grow up to 30 m. The shiny green leaves, 10 cm long by 5 cm wide, have rounded apexes and golden-brown under leaf and grow in opposites. The flower, the largest among the Avicennia species has a diameter of 6 to 10 mm when expanded. It is orange yellow to lemon yellow in color. The bark is smooth, dirty green to dark gray in color. It is slightly fissured and does not flake. The fruit is green or brown, heart-shaped abruptly narrowed to a short beak, is 2.5 cm long or more.

== Range and habitat ==
Avicennia officinalis ranges from the eastern Indian Ocean to the western Pacific, along the shores of India, Sri Lanka, Bangladesh, Myanmar, Thailand, Cambodia, Vietnam, Indonesia, Malaysia, Brunei, Timor Leste, New Guinea, and northern and eastern Australia (Northern Territory, Queensland, and New South Wales).

Avicennia officinalis is found sporadically on the banks of rivers and rarely found near the sea. It prefers clay soil and usually found inland.

== Uses ==
The 1889 book The Useful Native Plants of Australia records "mangrove egaie of the Cleveland Bay aboriginals; tagontagon of the Rockhampton aboriginals, baa-lunn, and ttchoonche are other aboriginal names. The fruit is heart-shaped, with two thick cotyledons. The aboriginals of Cleveland Bay dig a hole in the ground, where they light a good fire; when well ignited, they throw stones over it, which when sufficiently heated, they arrange horizontally at the bottom, and lay on the top the egaie fruit, sprinkling a little water over it; they cover it with bark, and over the whole, earth is placed to prevent the steam from evaporating too freely. During the time required for baking (about two hours), they dig another hole in the sand; the softened egaie is put into it, they pour water twice over it, and the midamio is now fit for eating. They resort to that sort of food during the wet season when precluded from searching for any other." (Murrell's testimony,* quoted by Mens. Thozet.) In Salt-water estuaries all round the coast. * Murrell was a shipwrecked sailor, who lived for 17 years with the aboriginals of Cleveland Bay, Queensland.".

== Taxonomy references ==
- Linnaei, Caroli; Salvii, Laurentii (1753). "Tetrandria Monogynia". Species plantarum: exhibentes plantas rite cognitas, ad genera relatas, cum differentiis specificis, nominibus trivialibus, synonymis selectis, locis natalibus, secundum systema sexuale digestas. Vol. Tomus I. Stockholm: Impensis Laurentii Salvii. p. 110.
- Linnaeus, Carl (1775-11-05). "Avicennia officinalis L." Linnean herbarium. Stockholm: Department of Phanerogamic Botany, Swedish Museum of Natural History.
- "Index Nominum Genericorum -- Avicennia". International Code of Botanical Nomenclature. Washington, D.C.: Smithsonian Museum of Natural History.

== Gallery ==
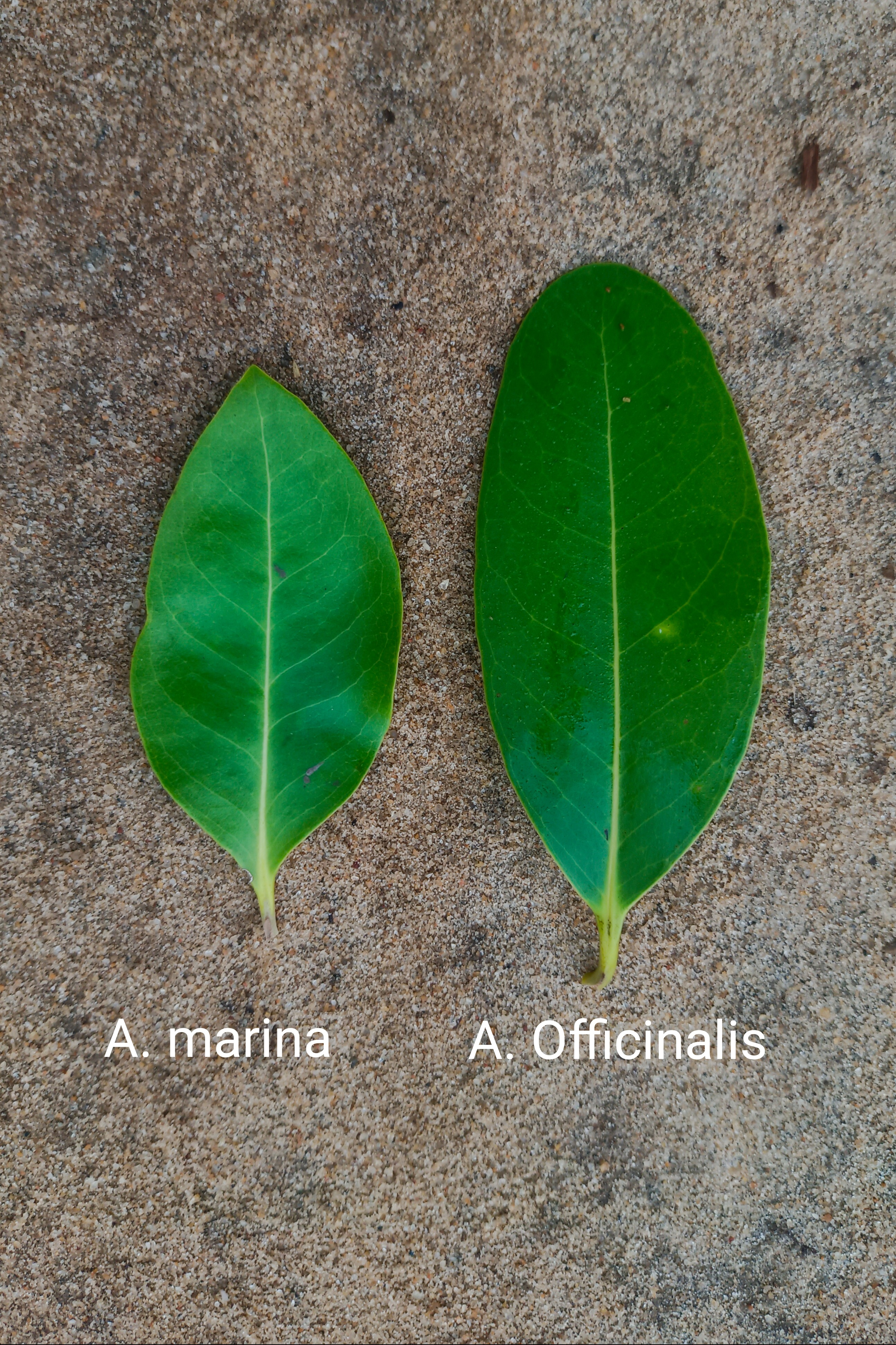
Avicennia Leaves

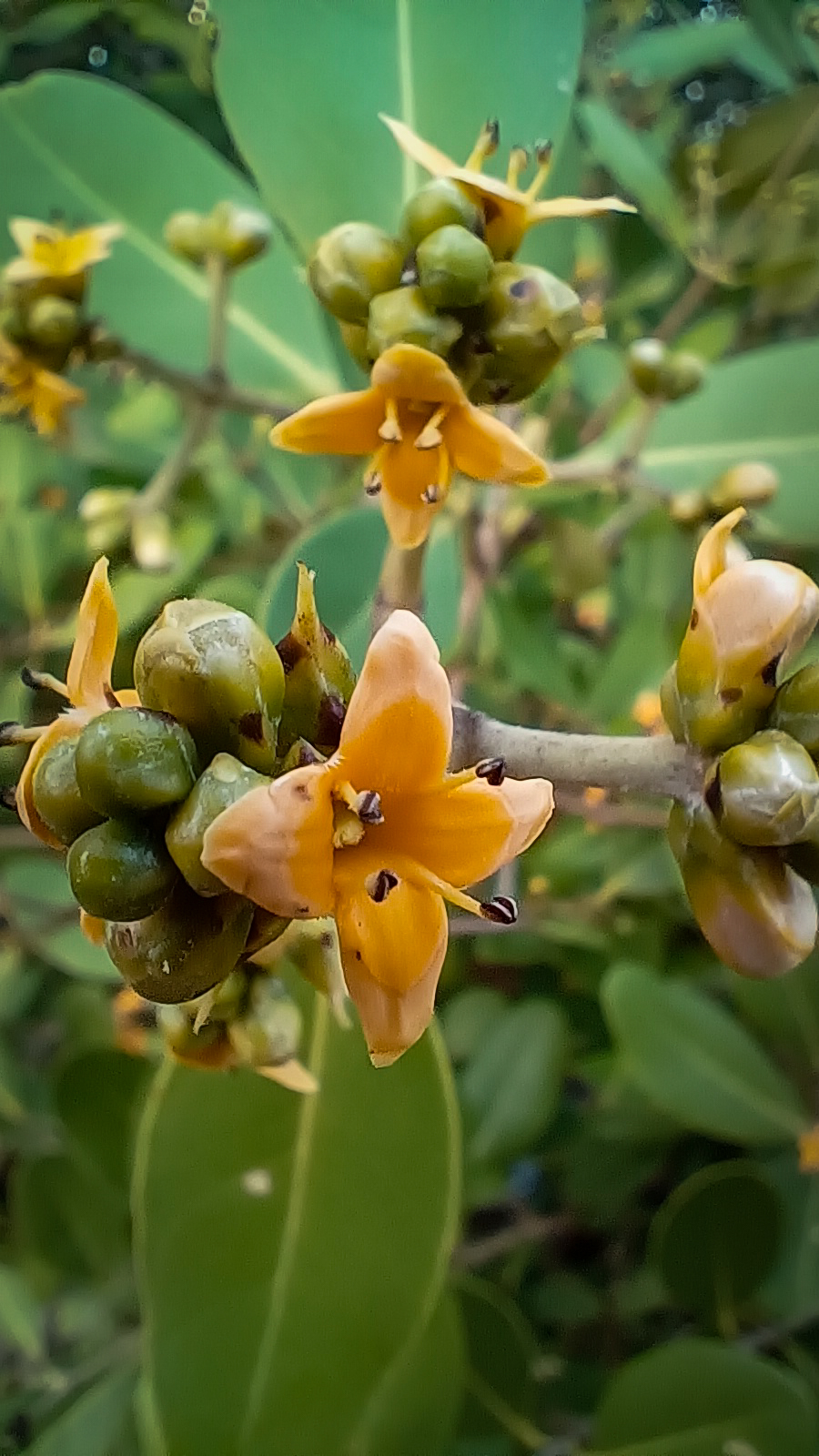
Flowers of Avicennia officinalis

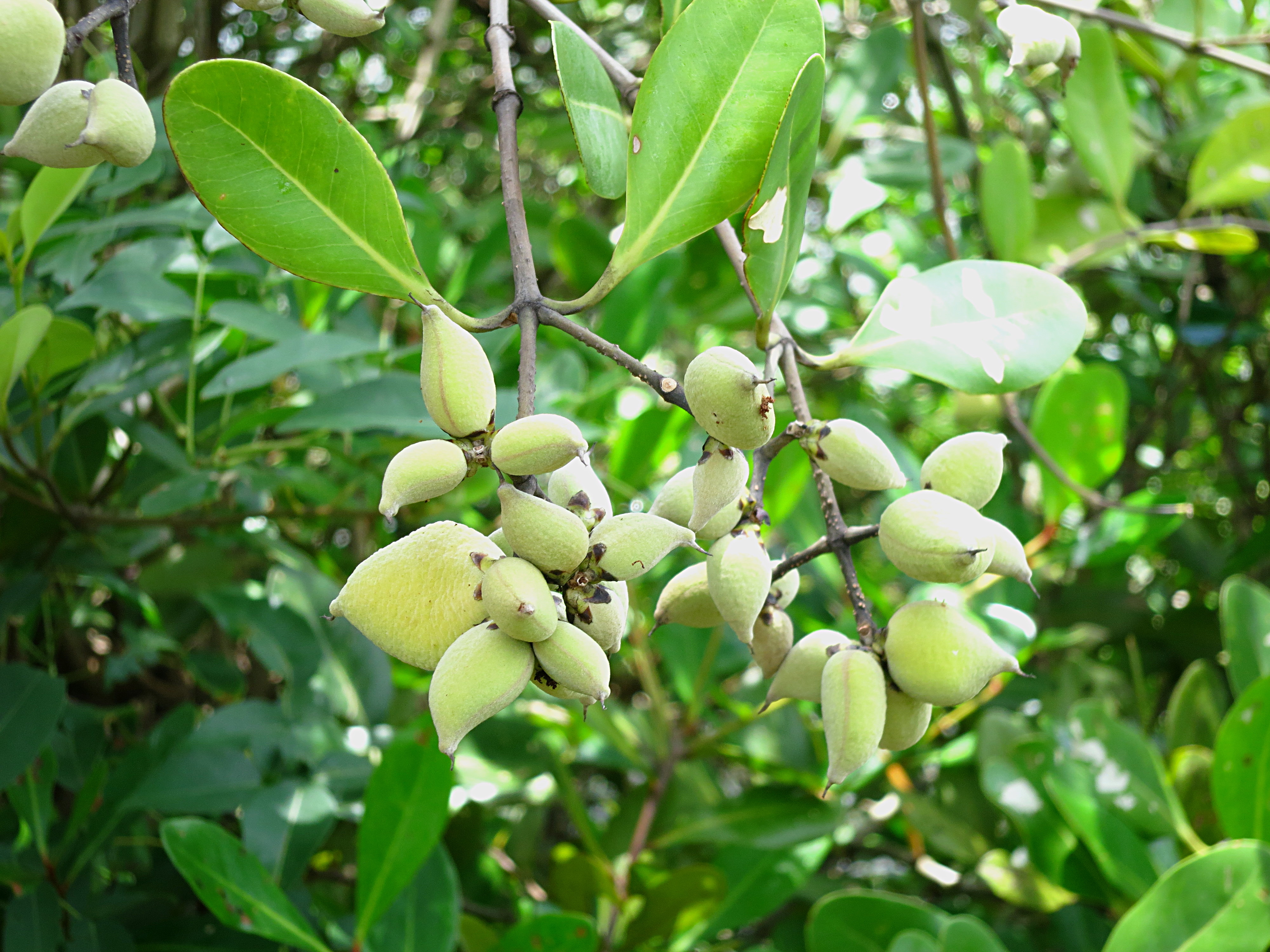
Avicennia officinalis fruit

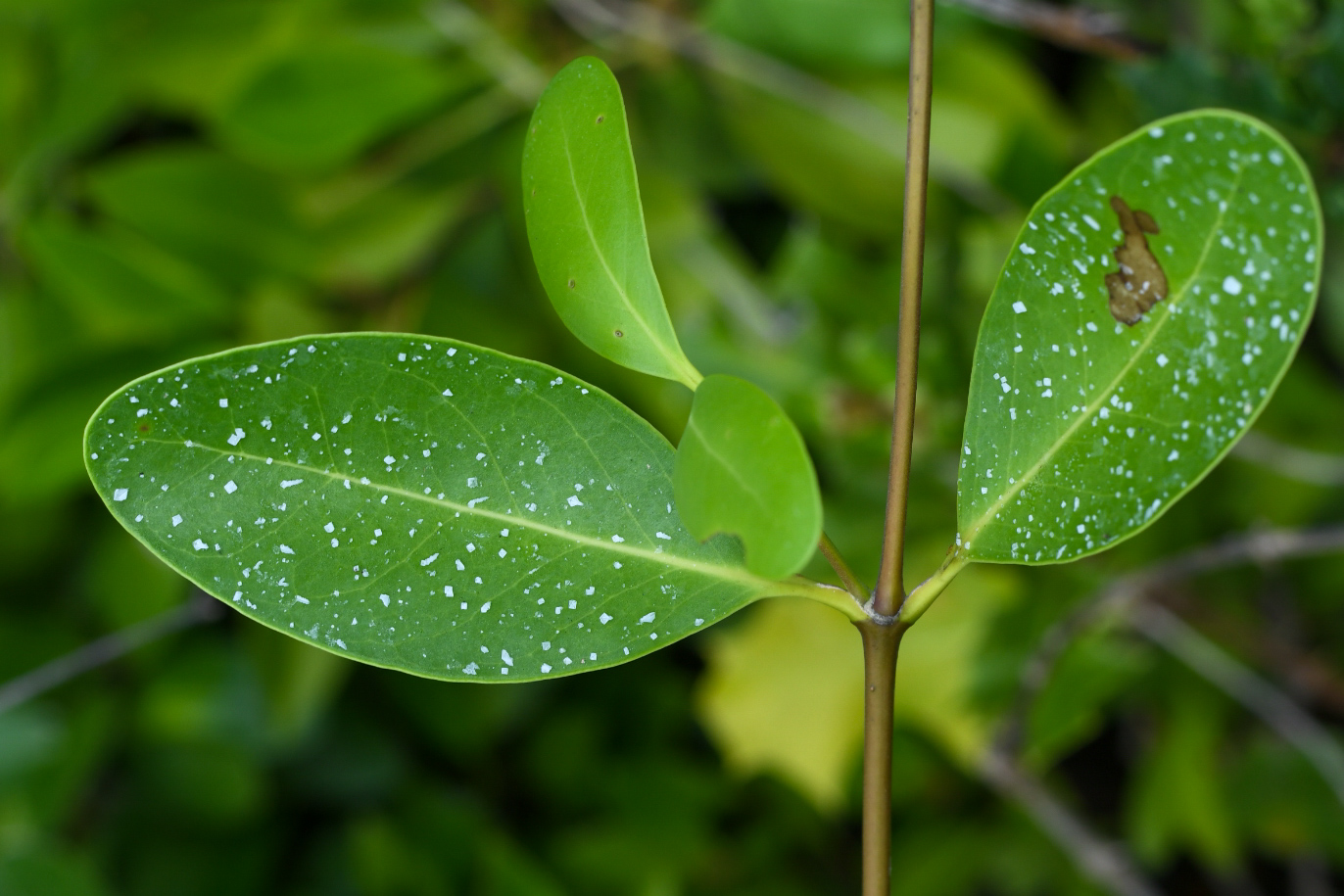
Salt crystals on Avicennia Leaves

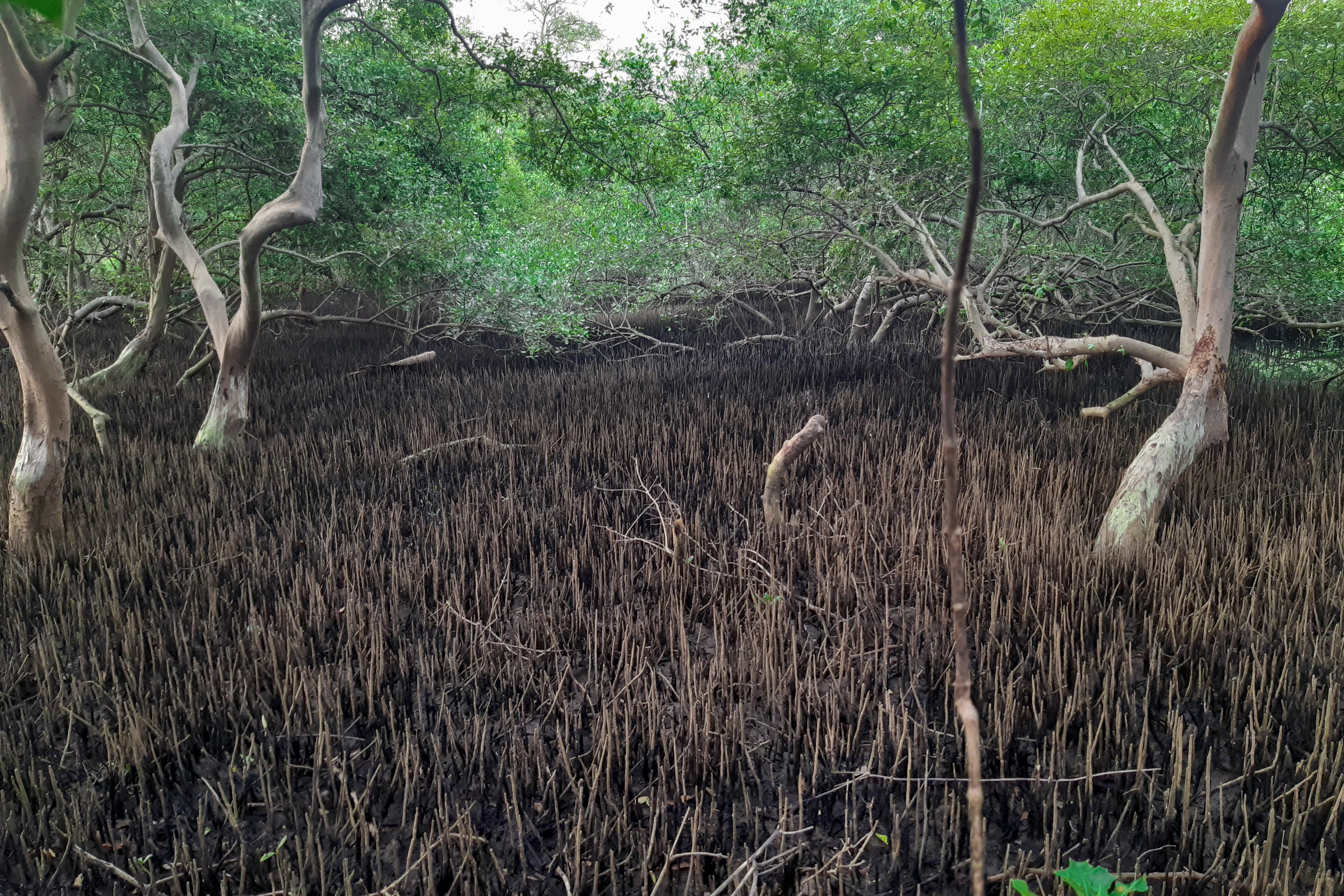
Aerial roots of Avicennia officinalis
