= List of mangrove tree species of Australia =

Family	Genus	Species	Common name/s	Subspecific Forms	Common name/s
Acanthaceae	Acanthus	ebracteatus	Bractless Holly Mangrove	subsp. ebracteatus	White-flowered Holly Mangrove
		ebracteatus	Bractless Holly Mangrove	subsp. ebarbatus	Purple-flowered Holly Mangrove
		ilicifolius	Holly Mangrove		
	Avicennia	integra	Stilted grey mangrove		
		marina	Grey/white mangrove	var. marina	Western white mangrove
		marina	Grey/white mangrove	var. australasica	Eastern white/grey mangrove
		marina	Grey/white mangrove	var. eucalyptifolia	Northern grey mangrove
		officinalis	Round-leafed grey mangrove		
Combretaceae	Lumnitzera	littorea	Red-flowered Black Mangrove		
		racemosa	White-flowered Black Mangrove		
		X rosea	Pink-flowered Black Mangrove		
Rhizophoraceae	Bruguiera	cylindrica	Large-leafed Orange Mangrove		
		exaristata	Rib-fruited Orange Mangrove		
		gymnorhiza	Large-leafed Orange Mangrove		
		parviflora	Small-leafed Orange Mangrove		
		X rhynchopetala	Hybrid Orange Mangrove		
		sexangula	Upriver Orange Mangrove		
		hainesii	Haines' Orange Mangrove		
	Ceriops	australis	Smooth-fruited Yellow Mangrove		
		pseudodecandra	Clumped Yellow Mangrove		
		tagal	Rib-fruited Yellow Mangrove		
	Rhizophora	X annamalayana	Northern Hybrid Stilt Mangrove		
		apiculata	Corky Stilt Mangrove		
		X lamarckii	Southern Hybrid Stilt Mangrove		
		mucronata	Upstream Stilt Mangrove		
		stylosa	Long-styled Stilt Mangrove		
Lythraceae	Pemphis	acidula	Reef Barrier Mangrove		
	Sonneratia	alba	White-flowered Apple Mangrove		
		caseolaris	Red-flowered Apple Mangrove		
		lanceolata	Lanceolate-leafed Apple Mangrove		
		X gulngai	Gulngai Hybrid Apple Mangrove		
		ovata	Ovate-leafed Apple Mangrove		
		X urama	Urama Hybrid Apple Mangrove		
Rubiaceae	Scyphiphora	hydrophylacea	Yamstick Mangrove		
Euphorbiaceae	Excoecaria	agallocha	Milky Mangrove, Blind-your-Eye	var. agallocha	Milky Mangrove
		agallocha	Milky Mangrove, Blind-your-Eye	var. ovalis	Ovate-leafed Milky Mangrove
Meliaceae	Xylocarpus	granatum	Cannonball Mangrove		
		mollucensis	Cedar Mangrove		
Bignoniaceae	Dolichandrone	spathacea	Trumpet-flowered Mangrove		
Myrtaceae	Osbornia	octodonta	Myrtle Mangrove		
Sterculiaceae	Heritiera	littoralis	Looking-glass Mangrove		
Ebenaceae	Diospyros	littorea	Ebony Mangrove		
Caesalpiniaceae	Cynometra	iripa	Wrinkle Pod Mangrove		
Plumbaginaceae	Aegialitis	annulata	Club Mangrove		
Bombaceae	Camptostemon	schultzii	Kapok Mangrove		
Primulaceae	Aegiceras	corniculatum	River Mangrove, Black Mangrove		
Lecythidaceae	Barringtonia	racemosa	Brackishwater Mangrove		
Arecaceae	Nypa	fruticans	Mangrove Palm		
Pteridacaeae	Acrostichum	aureum	Golden Mangrove Fern		
		speciosum	Showy Mangrove Fern		
