= Kelaa (Haa Alif Atoll) =

Island in Haa Alif Atoll, Maldives

Kelaa ކެލާ
- island
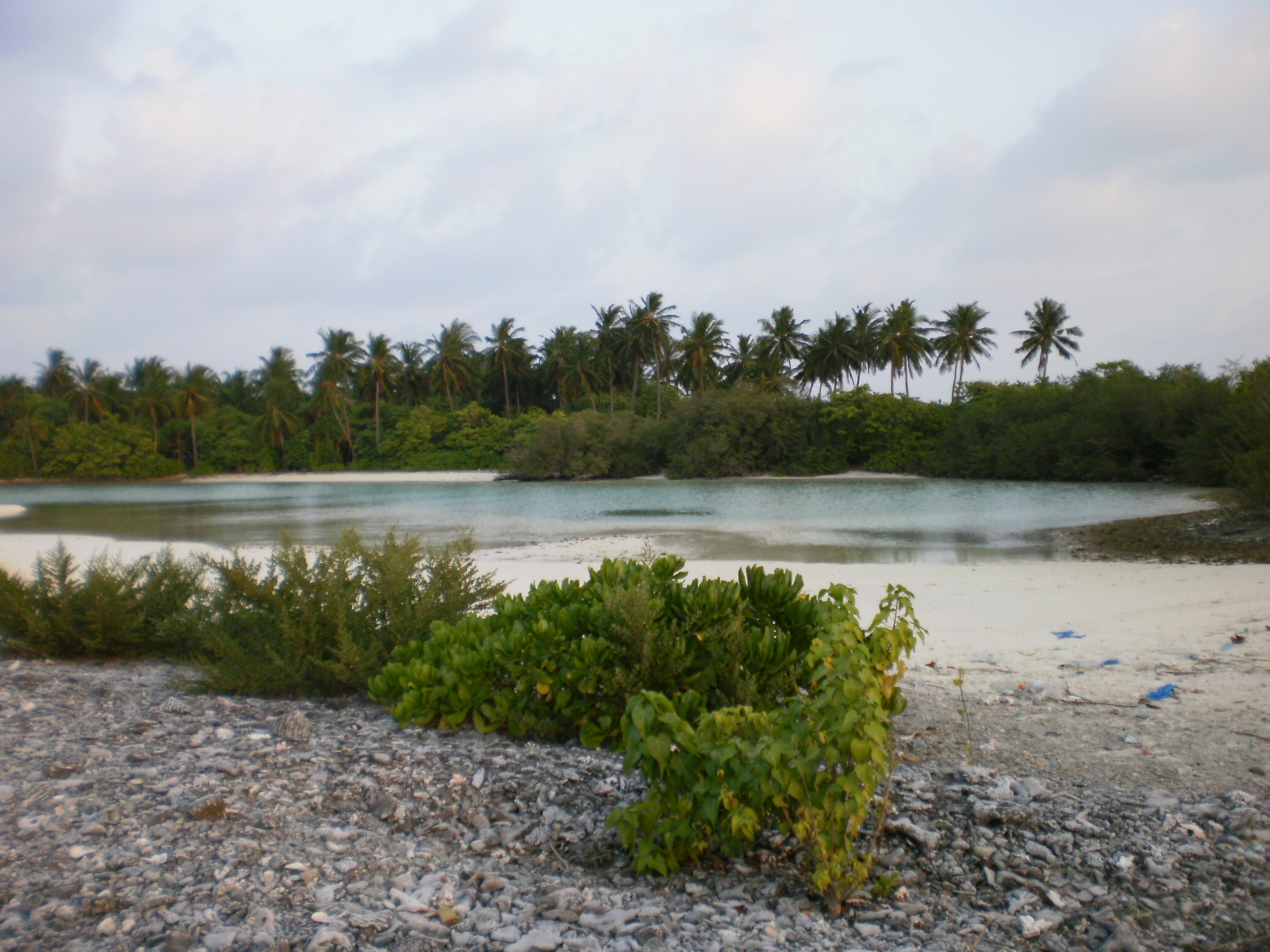

- Location in Maldives
- Coordinates: 6°57′11″N 73°12′56″E
- Country: Maldives
- Geographic atoll: Thiladhunmathi Atoll
- Administrative atoll: Haa Alif Atoll
- Distance to Malé: 309.66 km (192.41 mi)

Government
  - Council: Kelaa Island Council

Area
  - Land: 24.23 km^{2} (9.36 sq mi)

Dimensions
  - Length: 3.06 km (1.90 mi)
  - Width: 1.04 km (0.65 mi)

Population (2022)
  - Total: 1,115
  - Density: 46.02/km^{2} (119.2/sq mi)
- Time zone: UTC+05:00 (MST)
- Area code(s): 650, 20

Kelaa (Dhivehi: ކެލާ) is one of the inhabited islands of Haa Alif Atoll and geographically part of Thiladhummathi Atoll in the north of the Maldives. It is an island-level administrative constituency governed by the Kelaa Island Council.

== Origin of Name ==
Kelaa is one of the northernmost islands of the Maldives, specifically on the North-North-East (NNE) tip, making it the closest point in the Maldives to India, approximately 440 km from Trivandrum. Due to its location as an entry point, the name Kelaa is believed to have originated from the South Asian languages Hindi and Urdu, where kholar or kholaa (खोला) means an open space or entrance. Alternatively, some believe the name comes from the fish ‘Keyla mas’ or Yellowthread threadfin. Other stories suggest that Kelaa is named after the sandalwood tree, known as 'Kelaa' in the Dhivehi language. According to stories, early sailors discovered a sandalwood tree upon their arrival, guided by the scent carried on the wind. It is said that this tree was uprooted and taken by foreigners, and the spot where this occurred remains visible and is called 'Kelaa gas negi adi gan'du.' These are three theories regarding the origin of the name, though most people tend to favor the sandalwood tree explanation.

== Geography ==
Kelaa has a total land area of 203.37 hectares (2.0337 km^{2}) and a coastline stretching 8.6 km. The island has corals and rocks on its eastern side (Dhivehi: ފުއްޓަރު, romanized: Futtaru) and sandy shores on its western face (Dhivehi: އަތިރި, romanized: Athiri).

Kelaa is renowned for its expansive turquoise lagoon, covering 2,423 hectares - approximately 12 times larger than the island itself - alongside its white sandy beaches. Kelaa is recognisable by its agricultural landscape, which includes significant wetlands as part of its natural environment.

== Demography ==
As of 31 December 2023, the registered population of Kelaa is 2,444, comprising 1,142 females (47%) and 1,302 males (53%), making it the fourth largest population in Haa Alif Atoll.

However, the total resident population on the island is 1,115, consisting of 967 locals and 148 foreigners, according to the 2022 census data.

=== Resident Population Statistics of Kelaa ===
Historical population
Year	Pop.	±%
2000	1,196	—
2006	1,200	+0.3%
2014	1,041	−13.2%
2022	1,115	+7.1%
2000-2022: Census populations Source:

Similar to many inhabited islands, a significant number of Kelaa's registered population has migrated to the capital city, Malé, in pursuit of better social services, higher education, and employment opportunities. As of 2022, 1,082 registered citizens of Kelaa reside in Malé, underscoring this migration trend.

Additionally, a significant workforce also resides in other non-administrative islands, such as tourist resorts. Between 2000 and 2022, the resident population has shown minimal growth due to factors including migration trends, birth rates, economic conditions, and government policies.

== Economy ==
Kelaa, located in the Maldives, distinguishes itself among nearby islands for its abundant agricultural resources and expansive land capacity, fostering a thriving agricultural sector. In addition to agriculture, the island's workforce engages significantly in construction, fishing, civil service, and has recently embraced tourism as a growing economic contributor.

=== Tourism ===
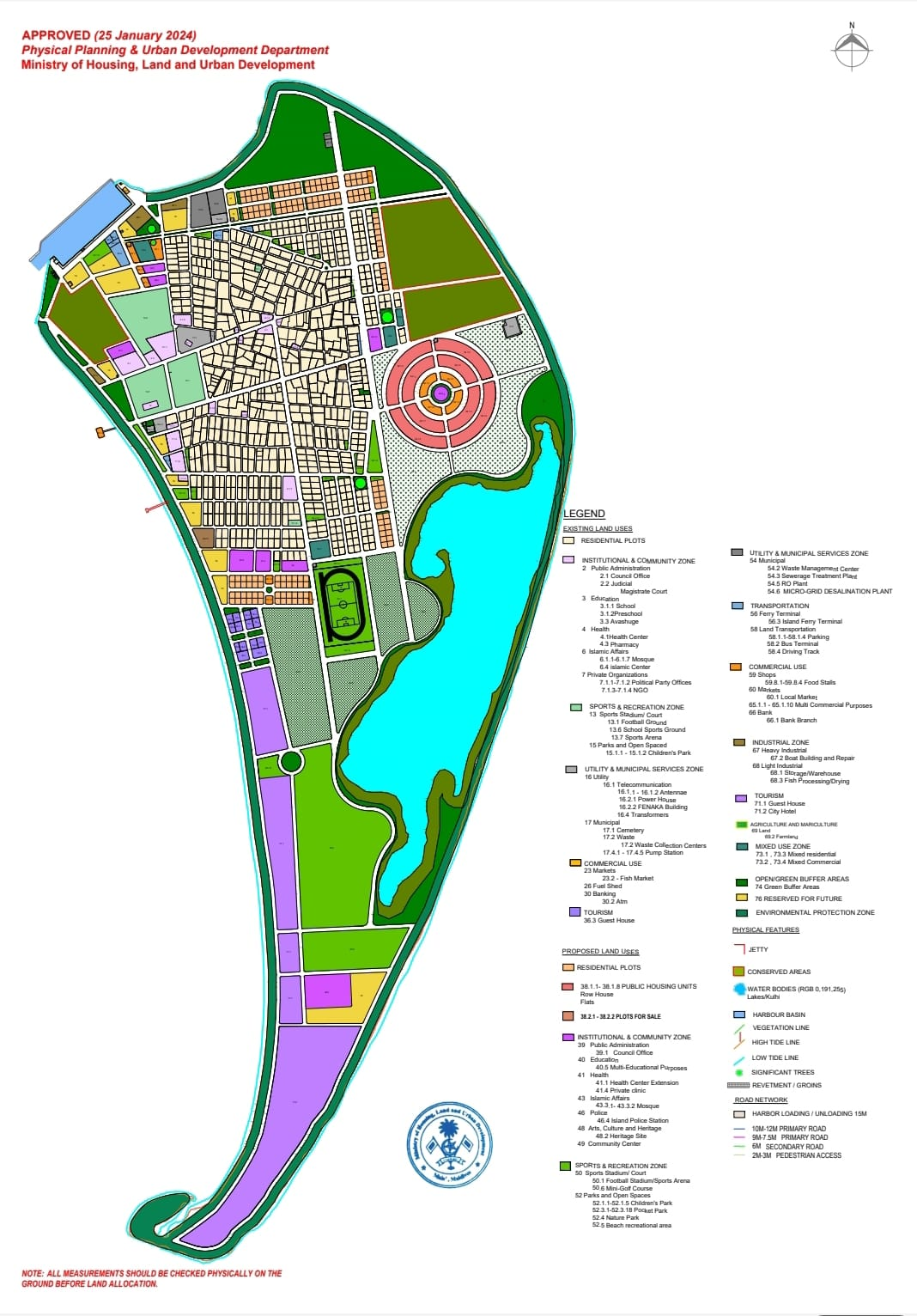
Approved Land Use Plan of Kelaa 2024

The official beginning of tourism on the island could be considered the year 2014 with the opening of its first registered guesthouse. As of June 2024, Kelaa offers accommodation through several registered guesthouses, providing a total bed capacity of 96. The development of tourism in Kelaa has been guided by a comprehensive land use plan drafted by the Kelaa Council, emphasizing strategic growth in the sector. In September 2015, the Kelaa Integrated Resort Project was launched under the auspices of then-Vice President Ahmed Adheeb Abdul Ghafoor, with Fedo Private Limited awarded the project bid. This initiative aims to enhance the island's tourism infrastructure, highlighting Haa Alif Kelaa Thundi beach's rare beauty.

=== Agriculture ===
Agriculture has historically served as the cornerstone of the local economy on the island. Throughout challenging periods like World War II, the community relied heavily on crops such as Kandoo for sustenance. Beyond residential zones, the island's remaining green spaces predominantly function as agricultural land, featuring a variety of crops including coconut palms and open fields suitable for cultivating watermelon, pumpkin, and other staples. The island is known for producing a diverse range of agricultural products such as scotch bonnet chilies, finger chilies, pumpkins, eggplants, cucumbers, lettuce, tomatoes, watermelon, and sweet potatoes. In areas with richer soil, cassava and other tropical fruits like mangrove apples and custard apples thrive, highlighting the agricultural diversity and resilience of the local farming practices.

== History ==
=== 1940s: World War II ===
In the early 1940s, during World War II, the British established a temporary Royal Air Force, RAF base in Kelaa. Although the exact dates are uncertain, it is believed that the initial planning for this base began in 1941, with construction completed in 1943. This strategic outpost served as a vital refueling station for Allied shipping and warplanes, crucial for supporting military operations in the region. Local islanders played a pivotal role in its establishment, assisting in construction efforts and supplying laborers. The base featured barracks, a jetty, and an armory, all contributing to its operational capability.

During this time, staple food items such as rice and flour were scarce, and the government rationed access to 0.5 Laahi rice (approximately 120 ml) per person per mealtime. Locals from nearby islands, including Kelaa, were hired by the RAF to work in exchange for food. Their tasks varied widely and included menial jobs such as disposing of waste, as there was no sewage system; waste was collected in chamber pot chairs.

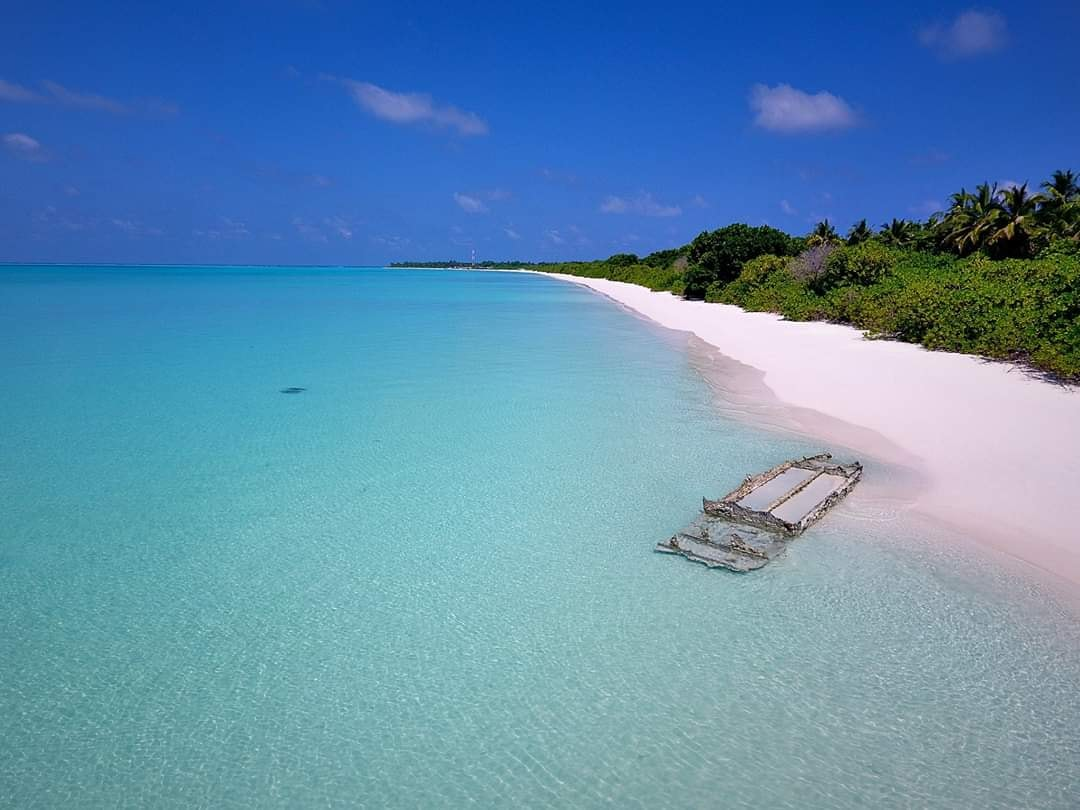
2007 photograph of the metal skeleton of the RAF seaplane on Kelaa Beach

The RAF base was located approximately 3 km from the resident population of Kelaa, and locals were barred from entering this area. One notable incident involved an RAF seaplane that failed to make a proper landing and ended up on the beach, where it remained until very recently.

After years of service, following the conclusion of the war, the British forces departed Kelaa, leaving behind significant infrastructure. The local community repurposed many of these facilities, and remnants of the base, including aircraft wreckage and structural remains, still bear witness to this historical period. The RAF base in Kelaa remains a notable part of the island's heritage, reflecting its brief yet impactful role during a critical juncture in global history.

=== Development in the 80s ===
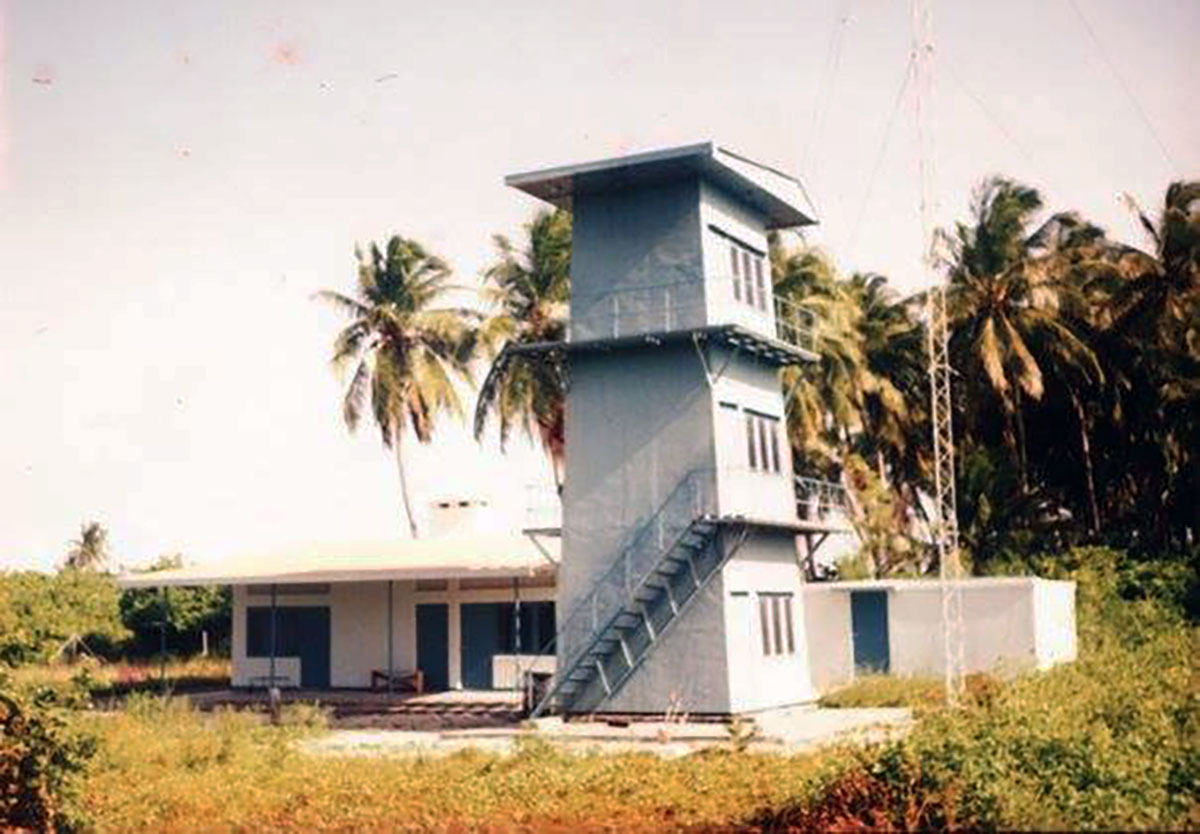
Radar station built in late 80s

In the 1980s, the Japanese government aimed to build three radar stations in the Maldives to monitor maritime activities. Initially, the stations were to be located in Hdh. Hanimaadhoo, but due to operational constraints, the site was moved to Kelaa. Construction began in early 1985, supervised by Maldivian National Defense Force (MNDF) officers, and completed by the end of the year. Local volunteers played a crucial role in preparing the site. The project produced a three-story radar building and a single-story accommodation unit, both of which later fell into disrepair after being abandoned by both governments. Despite its dilapidation, the site remains significant to the local community, evoking memories and suggesting potential for redevelopment as a tourist attraction.

=== Tsunami: 2004 ===
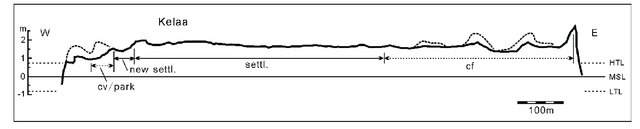
West-East profile of Kelaa, Haa Alifu. Dashed line indicates topographic relief near the transect. MSL: mean sea level, HTL: highest tide level, LTL: lowest tide level, cf: coconut forest, cv: coastal vegetation, settl: settlement.

The 2004 tsunami had minimal impact on Kelaa, primarily due to its geographical location and lagoon topography. Kelaa benefited from the protective barrier of the atoll and reef system, which dispersed and absorbed much of the tsunami's energy.

Settlement patterns, with fewer residents living directly on vulnerable shorelines, further reduced damage. The directionality of the tsunami also played a role, with Kelaa facing less inundation due to its location. However, some neighboring islands, such as Filladhoo, experienced drastic effects, with the tsunami nearly washing out the entire island. Despite this, unity was demonstrated as Kelaa immediately hosted families who lost their homes in Filladhoo, showcasing the resilience and solidarity of the Maldivian communities in the face of natural disasters.

== Education ==
=== History ===
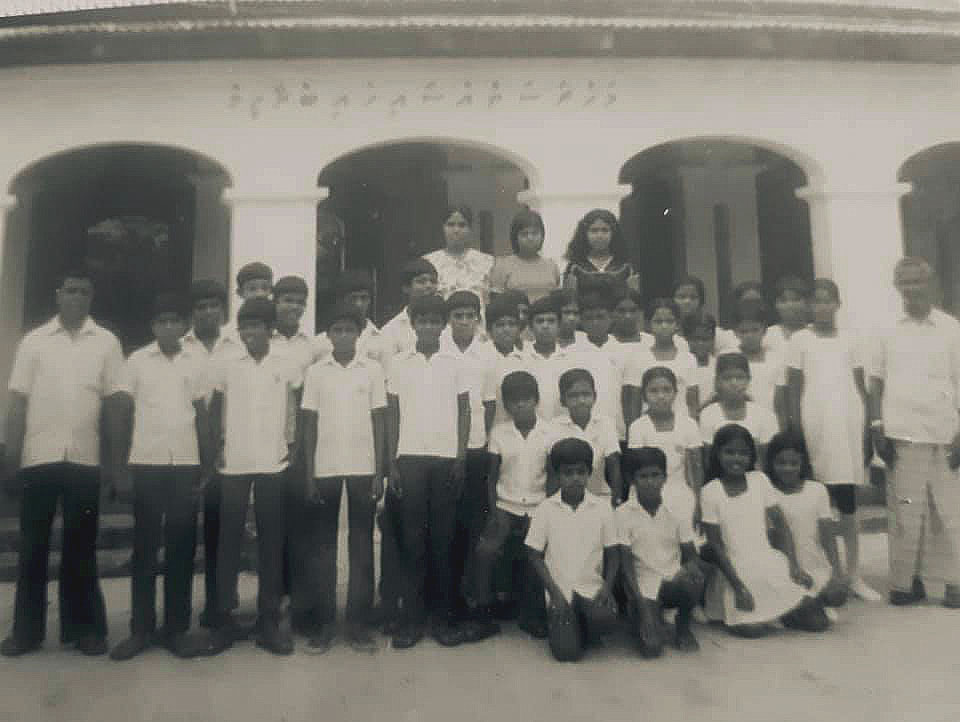
Madhrasathul Sheikh Ibrahim in Lily House Building (date early 80s)

The anniversary for formal beginning of school education in Kelaa has never been celebrated due to a discrepancy between the registered date under the Ministry of Education and the actual establishment date. The school was said to have established on 21 January 1945, yet the registered date is 24 years later. In 1993, the headmaster of school, Mr. Ahmed Faisal (Isthaana, HA. Kelaa), initiated the plans to celebrate the 25th anniversary based on the registered date of 16 January 1969. However, the Island Chief, Abdulla Waheed (Vina, HA. Kelaa), called for a committee meeting and decided to work towards re-registering the actual date.

Mr. Gasim Moosa Manik (Koattey, HA. Kelaa), a former teacher and a pioneer in education sector, was invited to assist in the process, where his records suggest the school education system commenced on 6 Safar 1364 in the Hijri calendar, which converts to 21 January 1945, in the Gregorian calendar. Mr. Mohamed Rasheed (Two Sons, HA. Kelaa), known as Lha Seedhi, teacher and headmaster, explained that the school was registered in 1969 as major documents containing key data about the island's history and development were lost in a fire incident in Kelaa Office (date unknown), and due to directives from then-President Ibrahim Nasir for school registration. While these were major reasons for the discrepancy in the dates, it is safe to say education has been a major part of the community of Kelaa since 1945.

The school, previously known as Madhrasathul Sheikh Ibrahim (MSI), was renamed Sheikh Ibrahim School (SIS) in 2018 to simplify its name. It is named after Al-Sheikh Ibrahim Rushdhee, a distinguished figure in Dhivehi literature and language (see notable figures). The institution provides education up to the secondary level, and its Grade 10 students sit for the Cambridge O'Level examinations.

==== Lily Pre-School Kelaa ====
The Secretariat of Kelaa Council oversees Lily Pre-School, which serves as an early learning institution for kindergarten education. Initially established in 1999, Lily Pre-School introduced official uniforms for all its students, marking its formalization. The school originally operated out of the Lily House Building but has since been relocated to its current premises.

== Religion ==
The island of Kelaa, like all islands in the Maldives, has a predominantly Muslim community, where teachings and way of life adhere to Islamic values. The island boasts seven mosques (as of June 2024); some are specifically constructed for women, while others cater exclusively to men. More recent mosques such as Masjid-al Ansar feature partitions to accommodate both men and women.

	Mosque Name	Name in Dhivehi	Size sqft	Capacity pax
1	Masjid-al Ansar	މަސްޖިދުލް އަންޞާރު	5380	670
2	Masjid-al Qufran	މަސްޖިދުލް ޢުފްރާން	1552	184
3	Old Friday Mosque	ހުކުރު މިސްކިތް	600	176
4	Masjid-al Zahra	މަސްޖިދުލް ޒަހްރާ	645	75
5	West Ward Women's Mosque	ހުޅަނގު އަވަށު އަންހެނުންގެ މިސްކިތް	1254	65
6	East Ward Women's Mosque	އިރުމަތީ އަވަށު އަންހެނުންގެ މިސްކިތް	505	63
7	Eid Mosque	ޢީދު މިސްކިތް	462	50

Source: Ministry of Islamic Affairs, accurate as of August 2024

== Cultural and Historical Landmarks ==
=== Lily House ===
The Lily House, a historic building over 80 years old, which holds great cultural significance for the people of Kelaa. The structure features a spacious 1700 sqft floor area, with main two entrances, and columns that showcase symmetry and the application of mathematical knowledge. Constructed using uva (u’a) or lime, it was originally dedicated to Maulood (Maaloodhu Ge), serving as a venue for the ritual recitation of Islamic devotional texts (Ar. mawlid).

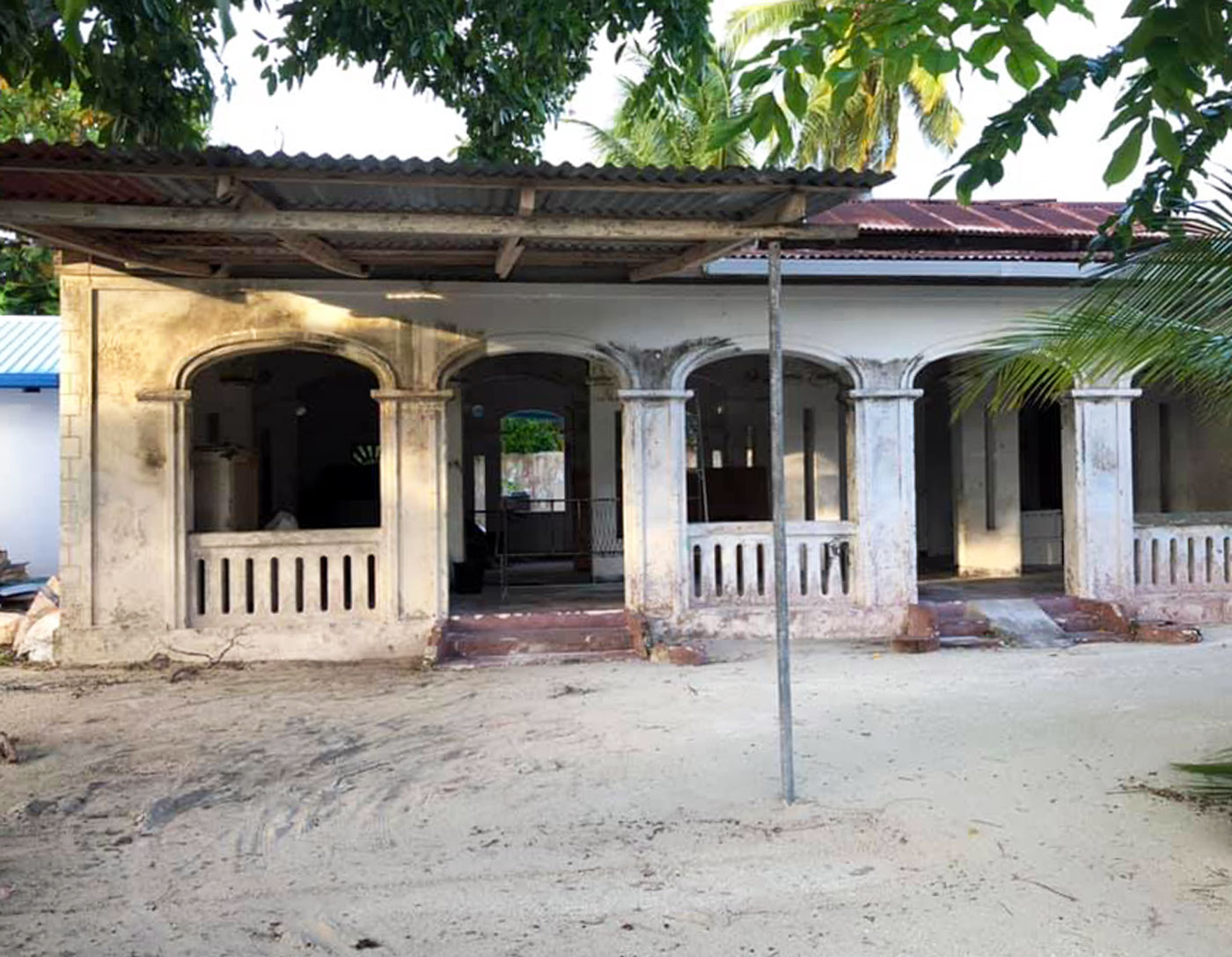
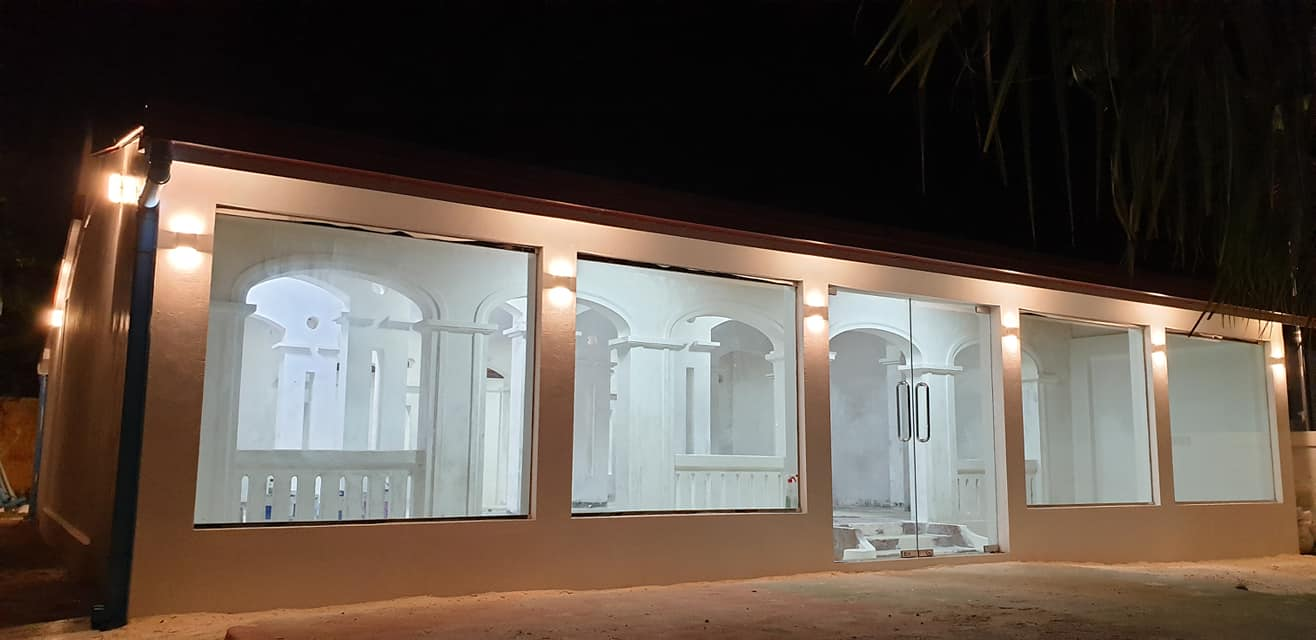

During these recitations, the entire island community would gather to listen, reflecting the deep-rooted cultural and religious traditions of Kelaa. Although these practices were abandoned decades ago, the building later found a new purpose as a school. It was first used as Madhrasathul Sheikh Ibrahim and later as Lily School for kindergarten-level children's education for some time.

While the precise date when the Lily House first came into use is not specifically recorded, construction is said to have begun in the late 1940s and was completed in the early 1950s during the tenure of Kasim as the Chief (katheeb) of Kelaa. Today, the Lily House has been restored and protected, standing as a testament to the island's rich heritage and communal spirit.

=== Kelaa Old Friday Mosque ===
The Kelaa Old Friday Mosque, built during Al-Sultan Mohamed Ibn Haji Ali Thukkalaa (Dhevvadhoo Rasgefaanu)'s reign (1692–1701) in Hijri Year 1111, remains an active place of worship today. Situated in a compound with two wells and a cemetery adorned with ancient tombstones, the mosque, primarily constructed from coral stone, boasts a prayer hall surrounded by veranda-like antechambers on three sides and an elevated entrance stair. Featuring timber sliding doors and a tiered roof, the interior is adorned with lacquered calligraphy panels and intricate coral carvings.

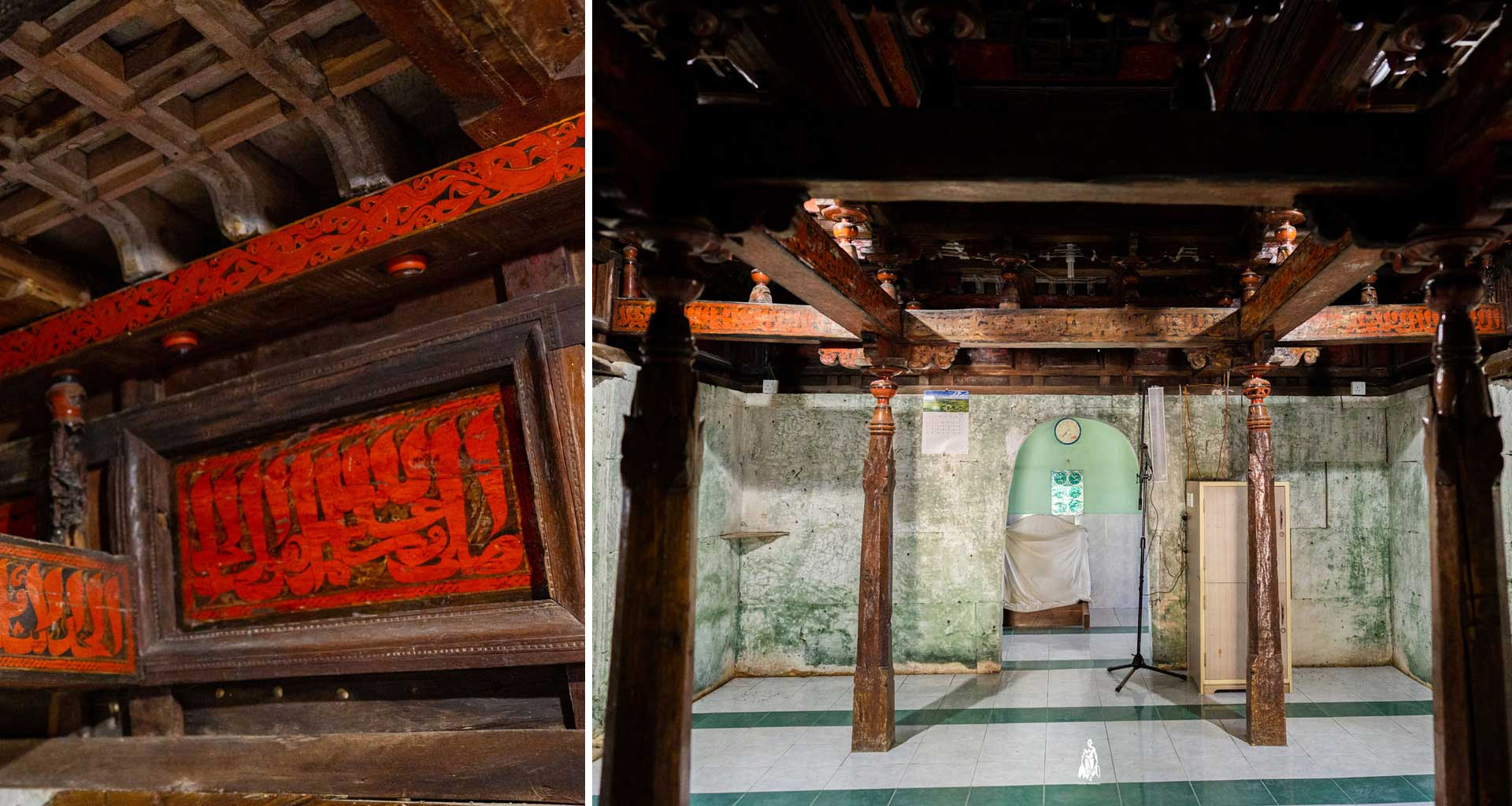

The cemetery also features numerous grave stones with engravings dating back to ancient times, adorned with Arabic scriptures that can still be seen today. Despite extensions that have altered its originality, ongoing restoration efforts have preserved its historical and architectural significance.

=== British Armory ===
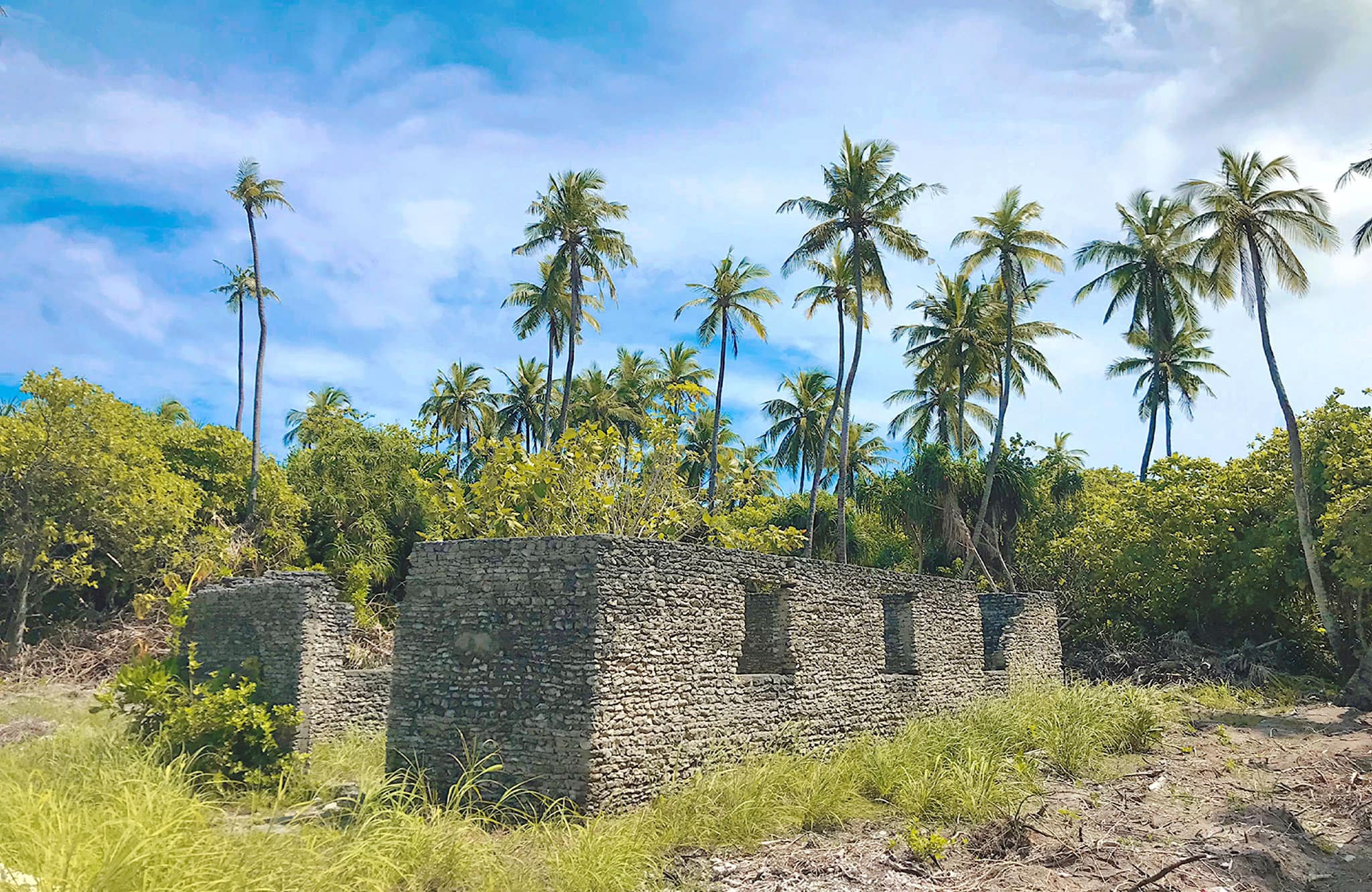
British Armory Remains 2021

During World War II, the British Royal Air Force (RAF) utilized numerous sites in the southern part of Kelaa, locally referred to as Thun’di (Dhivehi: ތުނޑި). Despite the passage of time, only a few structures have managed to withstand the years.

One such enduring relic is the British Armoury (Dhivehi: ބަޑިގެ, romanized: Badige), notable for its surviving remnants, including intact exterior walls. These visible remains stand as poignant reminders of the site's historical significance and its crucial role during the war.

== Community, Culture, and Sports ==
=== Maliku Dhandi ===
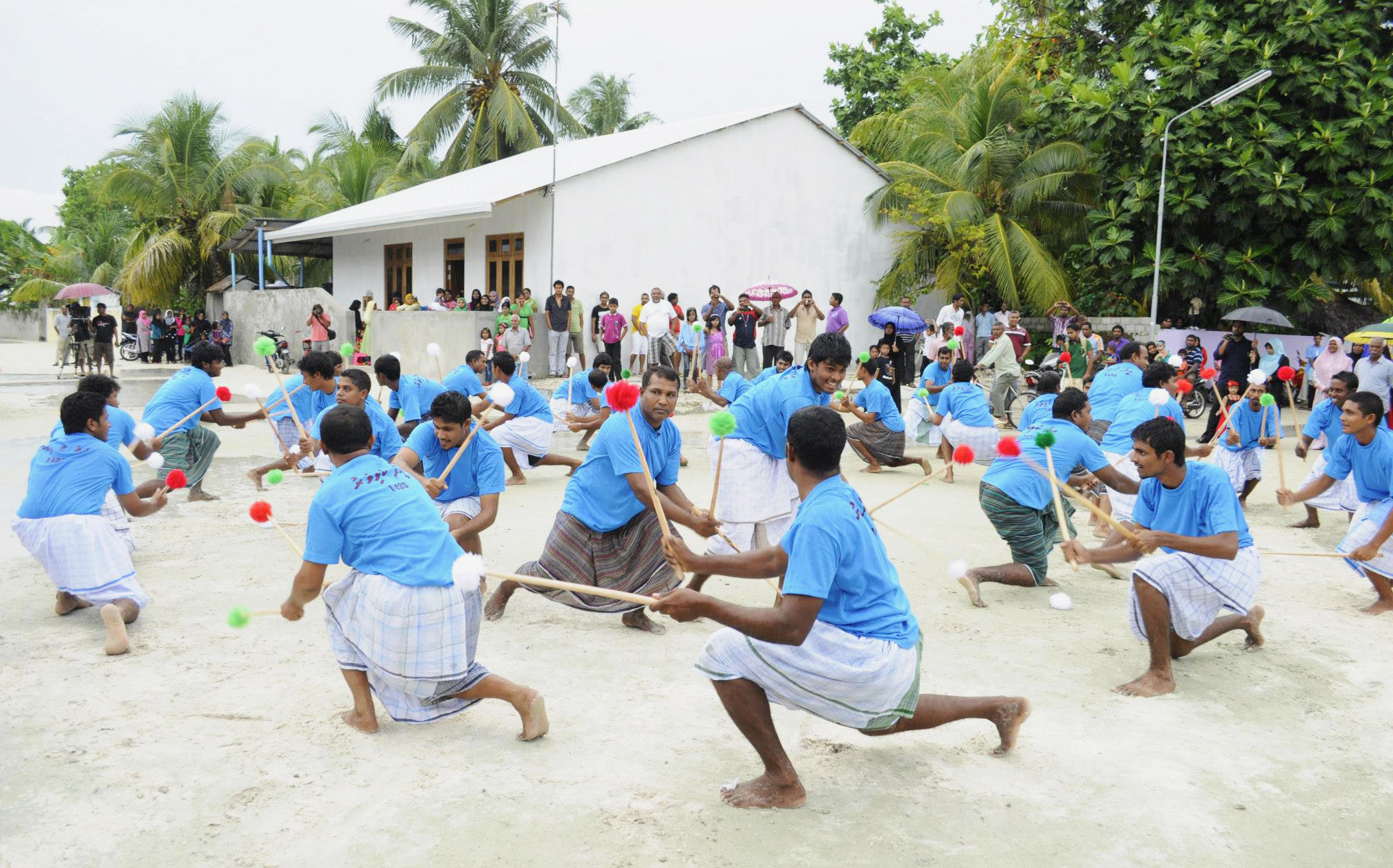
Kelaa Dhandi Group performing Maliku dhandi 2012

Maliku dhandi މަލިކު ދަނޑި is a distinctive cultural dance exclusive to Kelaa. Although its name implies an origin in Maliku Atoll in Lakshadweep, it is believed to have been introduced to Kelaa by visitors from Maliku. Research indicates that the inhabitants of Maliku neither currently practice nor have historically practiced this dance. While its precise historical origins are unclear, the traditional stick dance has been carefully maintained by the people of Kelaa.

Currently, it is only performed in Kelaa. The dance includes two distinct styles, Mulhifoa Dhandi and Maali Dhandi. Sticks used in the dance are crafted from locally sourced materials such as ironwood (Dhivehi: ކުރެދި, romanized: Kuredhi) and Lime berry (Dhivehi: ކުދި ލުނބޯ, romanized: Kudhi Lunboa), adorned with decorative elements like cloth 'Maa' and metal caps called Fulus. Accompanied by traditional music from a hand drum known as Thaara (Dhivehi: ތާރަ), made from goat or ray skin, Maliku dhandi stands as a testament to Kelaa's dedication to preserving cultural heritage.

=== Stilt Fishing ===
Stilt fishing, locally known as Kani Masverikan (Dhivehi: ކަނި މަސްވެރިކަން) is a culturally significant form of fishing in Kelaa. The precise origins of stilt fishing remain uncertain, though some social media posts suggest that earlier Kelaa merchants might have adopted the technique from Malabar fisherman to in Kerala, India or some parts Sri Lanka, where similar practices are observed.

The stilts used for this type of fishing are typically made from corkwood (Dhivehi: ދުނބުރި, romanized: Dhun'buri) or Sea Randa (Dhivehi: އުނި, romanized: Uni) wood, and are placed/planted in the lagoon of Gaamuli, southern tip of the island.

Stilt fishing is particularly useful during the Hulhangu monsoon when the seas are too rough for fishing boats. Common catches from this method include Bonefish (Dhivehi: މީމަސް), Grey large-eye (Dhivehi: އުނިޔަ), and occasionally One-spot snapper (Dhivehi: ފިލޮޅު) or Trevally (Dhivehi: ހަނދި) as well. This traditional fishing technique is not widespread across all Maldivian islands, making Kelaa one of the few places where stilt fishing is still practiced.

=== Watersports ===
The island is known for its turquoise lagoon, a natural feature that has become increasingly popular with tourists. Motorized water sports such as jet skiing, parasailing, and scuba diving are available in abundant supply to meet visitor demand.

=== Surfing ===
Surfing in Kelaa, while not widely recognized, is fairly common due to the excellent surf breaks on the eastern side of the island. In earlier times, before industry-grade surfboards became accessible, local youth often used wooden pieces from breadfruit trees, known locally as Malhu, to surf.

This practice is still seen among children and young surfers. With the rise in tourism, the area's surf breaks are expected to gain popularity and contribute to future growth.

== Ecosystem and Biodiversity ==
=== Mangrove Swamp ===
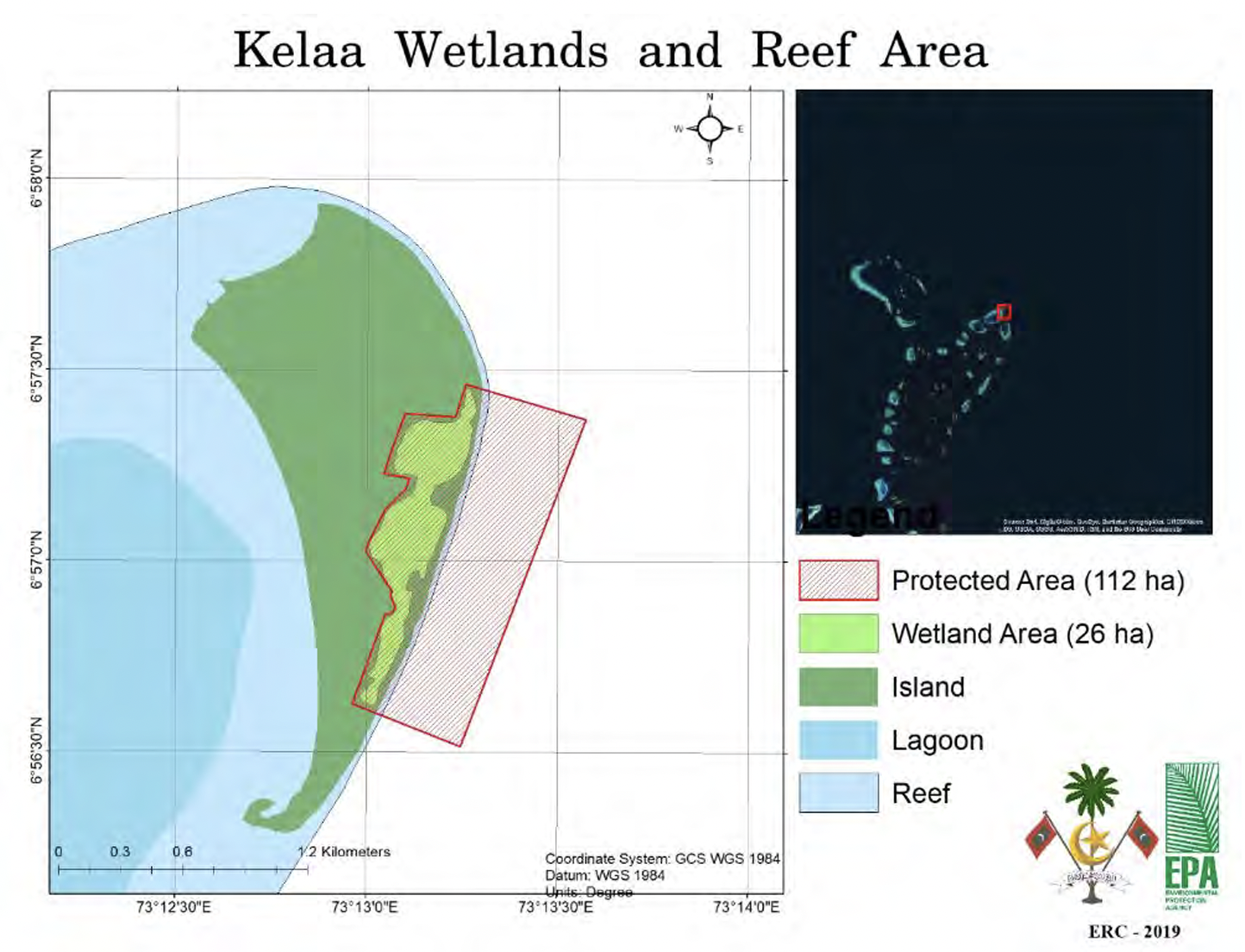
Kelaa Wetlands and Reef Area

These wetlands cover 26 hectares, accounting for 10.8% of the island's total land area. Since June 2019, this area has been designated as a protected area by the Ministry of Environment, serving as a natural reserve with abundant mangroves. The wetlands host a significant population of the mangrove species such as Small-leafed orange mangrove (Dhivehi: ކަނޑޫ, romanized: Kan'doo), Mangrove apple (Dhivehi: ކުއްޅަވައް, romanized: Kulhlhavah), with some Mangrove trees over 50 years old. During World War II, when food scarcity was widespread, Kan'doo provided crucial food security, making Kelaa more resilient than nearby islands.

This ecosystem also supports both endemic and migratory bird species as well. Some observed species include protected species such as Grey heron (Dhivehi: މާކަނާ, romanized: Maakana) Cattle egret (Dhivehi: އިރުވާހުދު, romanized: Iruvaahudhu) White-breasted waterhen (Dhivehi: ކަނބިލި, romanized: Kan'bili) Black-crowned night heron (Dhivehi: ރާބޮނދި, romanized: Raabon'dhi) Koel (Dhivehi: ކޮވެލި, romanized: Koveli).

In 2020, the rare mangrove species Bruguiera hainesii was given the local name "Kelavaki" by the Dhivehi Bahuge Academy. This naming was announced by the Ministry of Environment of the Maldives. Four trees of this species were identified in HA Kelaa by the IUCN Mangrove Specialist Group and the MSG Red List Coordinator, Dr. Jean Yong.

The name "Kelavaki" was chosen after considering the names of other mangrove species in the Maldives and the significance of Kelaa. The Ministry highlighted that this discovery adds to the unique features of the island.

In “Kelavaki” Park, visitors will be able to observe the various types of mangroves in Kelaa, including several endangered species. Kelaa Youth Forum has also published a leaflet detailing these mangroves & the different wildlife which inhabit them, to better educate the public.

=== Golden shower tree ===
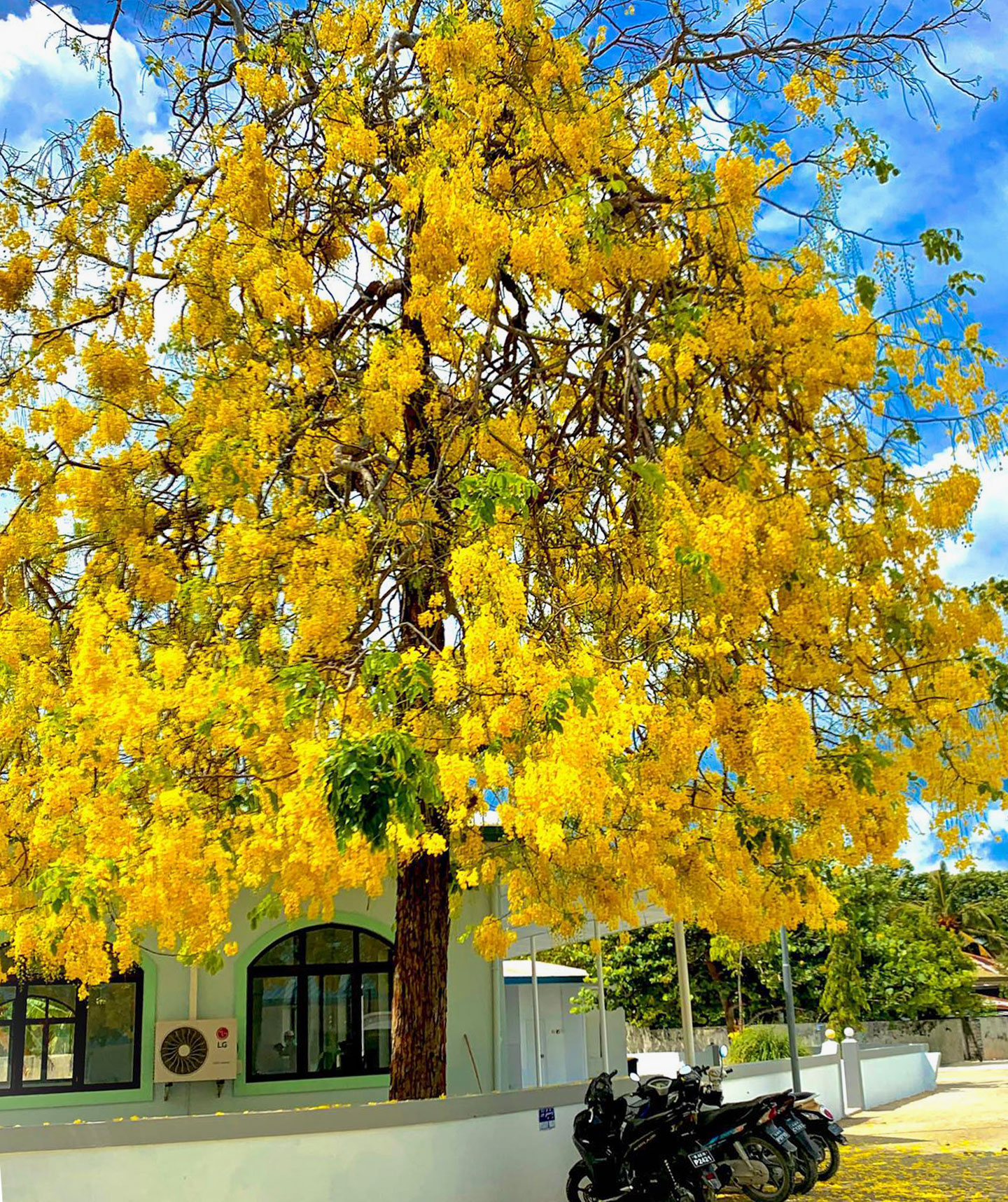
Cassia fistula in Kelaa

The An'malthaas, known in English as the pudding pie tree, Indian Laburnum, or Golden Shower plant (Cassia fistula), is a rare sight in the Maldives. Situated within the compound of Masjid-al Qufran, directly in front of the Secretariat of the Kelaa Council Office, this Golden Shower Tree is a striking presence. Having been planted in the late 1980s, it has withstood all seasons and events for over 30 years suggesting that more of these trees could brighten up the island. Its late spring bloom mirrors the vibrant magnolia and cherry blossoms of temperate regions, transforming Kelaa into its own version of spring. The tree produces a profusion of yellow flowers, often covering the tree so densely that its leaves are scarcely visible

Adapted to dry climates, Cassia fistula is believed to have originated in Southeast Asia and has since been introduced to tropical regions worldwide. Its flowering season typically spans from April to July, with some trees continuing to bloom until October, particularly in dry years.

=== Fish Poison Tree ===
The Fish Poison tree, scientifically known as Barringtonia asiatica (L.) Kurz, is a prevalent species found on numerous Maldivian islands, serving as a typical shade tree grown for windbreak and wave barrier purposes. Locally referred to as Kin’bi Gas (Dhivehi: ކިނބި ގަސް), these trees hold significant cultural and historical value. One such tree, located within a school compound, stands as a remarkable example, boasting an age exceeding 100 years.

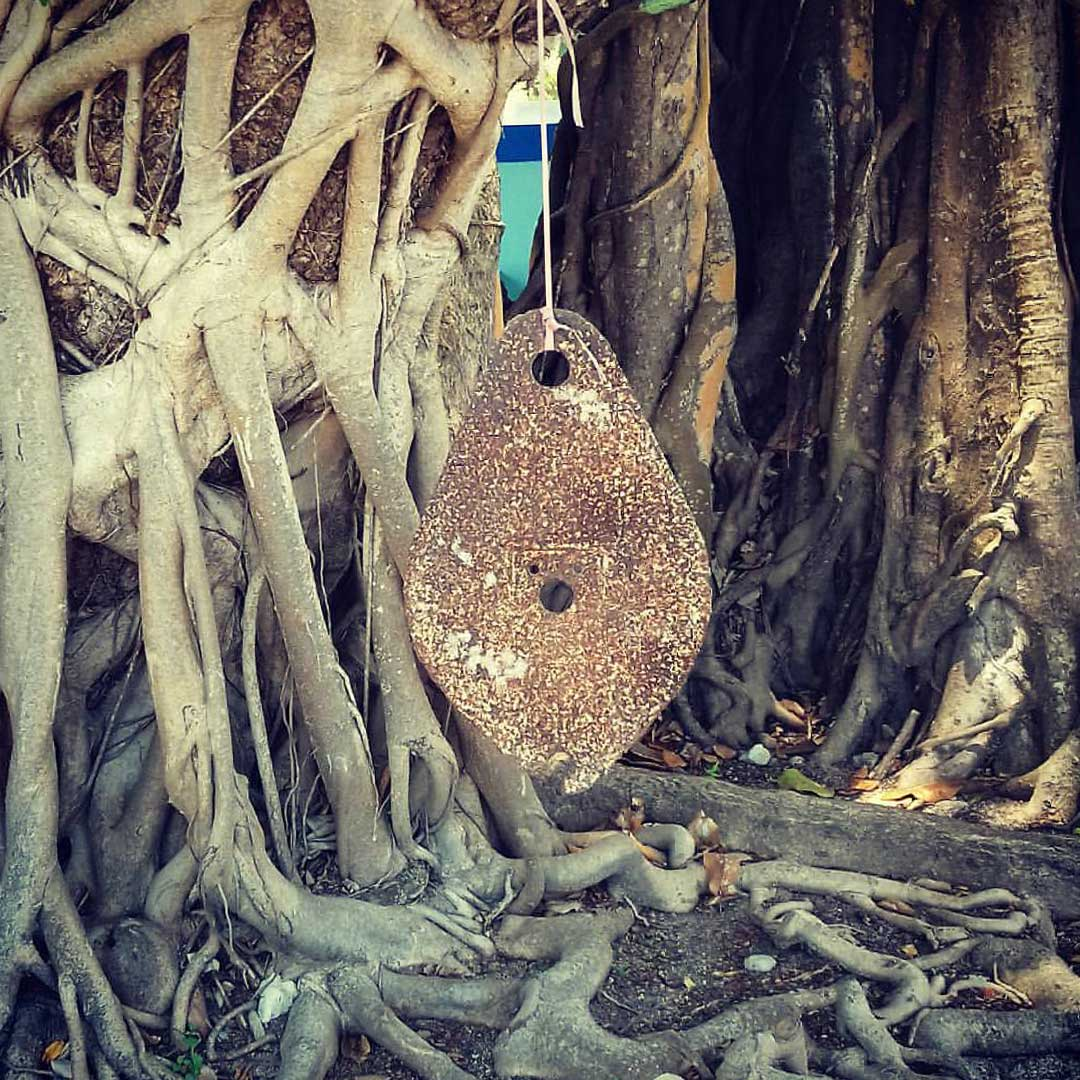
Dandoora - Kelaa Kin'bi gas

This particular tree has been ingrained in the local heritage due to its multifunctional role. Not only did its ample shade provide shelter for schoolchildren during early assemblies, but it also featured a unique addition—a Large Metal Sheet known as a Dandoora. This sheet served as a makeshift school bell, struck with a gong to signal the start and end of school activities.

== Notable Figures ==
=== Al-Sheikh Ibrahim Rushdhee ===
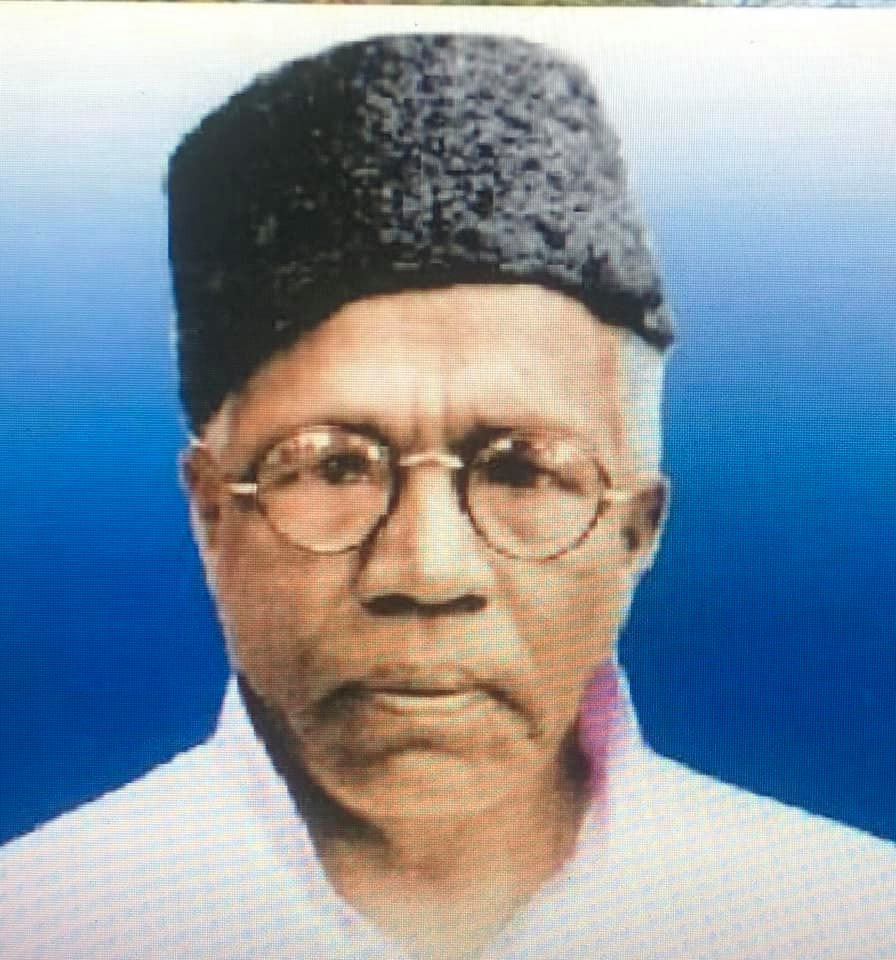
Al-Sheikh Ibrahim Rushdhee 1897-1961

Al-Sheikh Ibrahim Rushdhee, born on 15 October 1897 in Kelaa, is celebrated for his significant contributions to Dhivehi literature and language. His lifelong dedication to education and teaching is honored by the Kelaa school named in his memory.

He left for Egypt in 1913 to study at Jami' al-Azhar (Al-Azhar University), where he remained for over 13 years. During this time, he published numerous works and developed his proficiency in Arabic. He is reputed to be the first Maldivian graduate of Jami' al-Azhar. Upon his return to the Maldives in 1927, during Sultan Muhammad Shamsuddin (III)'s reign, Sheikh Ibrahim became a founding teacher of Madhrasathul Saniyya, now known as Aminiya School. He also served as a member of Parliament and Attorney General, making significant contributions to the Maldives' legal system. One of his notable works, "Sullamal Areeb" (Arabic: سلمال أريب), published on 5 November 1936, is a foundational text for the Dhivehi language, detailing the use of nouns, pronouns, and written formats. Sheikh Ibrahim died on 29 October 1961, at age 64, leaving a lasting legacy in education and literature.

=== Ali Ibrahim Manik (Kelaa Alibe) ===
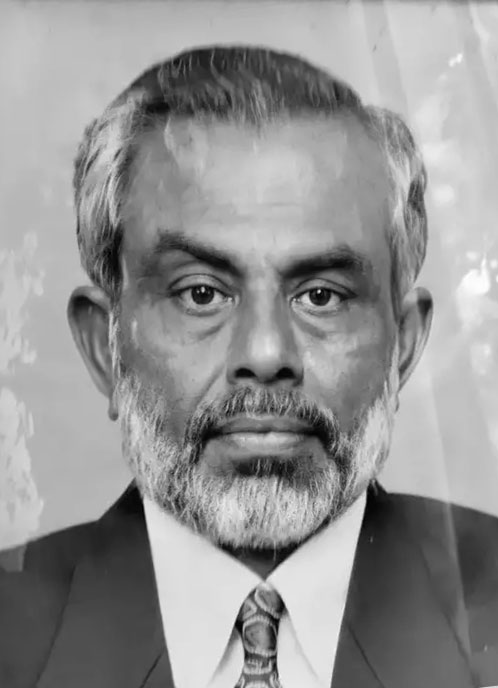
Ali Ibrahim Manik (1945–2021)

Ali Ibrahim Manik, commonly known as Kelaa Alibe, was born in Kelaa and was a beloved figure within the Kelaa community. He died on December 7, 2021, at the age of 76. A former parliament member and lawyer, Alibe dedicated himself to improving the lives of his fellow Kelaa residents. During a time when electricity was scarce, he constructed a generator house on the island to provide essential power. Alibe also championed education by hiring two Indian teachers for the local school, which previously only taught in Dhivehi. Additionally, he supported economic development by establishing a tailor shop and importing goats, and providing necessary tools and improved the agriculture sector.

A passionate advocate for Dhivehi language and culture, Alibe expressed his devotion through poetry, drama scripts, and historical writings, including his notable poem "މިހެން ނޫންތޯ ކަން ހުރީ!". His legacy continues to resonate deeply within the Kelaa community.
