= Kelaa =

Kelaa may refer to:

- Kelaa (Haa Alif Atoll), Maldives
- El Kelaa des Sraghna, Morocco
