= Bruguiera × hainesii =

Conservation status
- Critically Endangered (IUCN 3.1)

Scientific classification
- Kingdom: Plantae
- Clade: Embryophytes
- Clade: Tracheophytes
- Clade: Spermatophytes
- Clade: Angiosperms
- Clade: Eudicots
- Clade: Rosids
- Order: Malpighiales
- Family: Rhizophoraceae
- Genus: Bruguiera
- Species: B. × hainesii

Binomial name
- Bruguiera × hainesii C.G.Rogers

Species of flowering plant

Bruguiera × hainesii is a species of mangrove in the family Rhizophoraceae. It is native to the coasts of Myanmar, Peninsular Malaysia, Singapore, New Guinea, the Solomon Islands, and northern Queensland. It is a naturally-occurring interspecies hybrid of B. gymnorhiza and B. cylindrica.

== Conservation status ==
It is listed as critically endangered by the IUCN.
