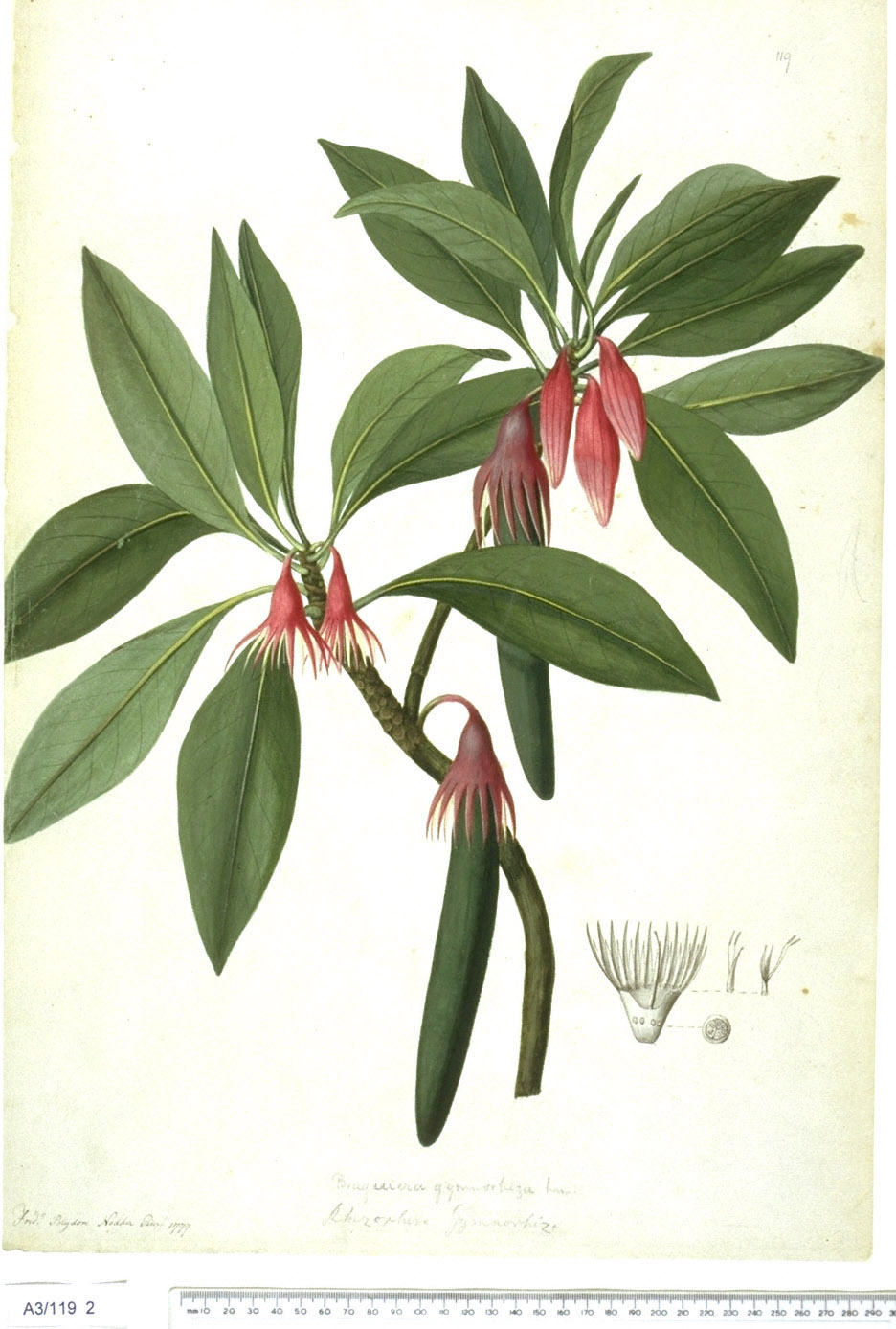
- Bruguiera gymnorrhiza

Scientific classification
- Kingdom: Plantae
- Clade: Tracheophytes
- Clade: Angiosperms
- Clade: Eudicots
- Clade: Rosids
- Order: Malpighiales
- Family: Rhizophoraceae
- Genus: Bruguiera; Lam.

Synonyms
- Kanilia Blume; Paletuviera Thouars ex DC.

= Bruguiera =

Genus of flowering plants

Bruguiera is a plant genus in the family Rhizophoraceae. It is a small genus of five mangrove species and three hybrids of the Indian and west Pacific Ocean region, its range extending from East Africa and Madagascar through coastal India, Sri Lanka and Southeast Asia to northern Australia, Melanesia and Polynesia. It is characterised by calyces with 8-16 lanceolate, pointed lobes, 16-32 stamens, explosive release of pollen, and viviparous propagules. It is named in honour of French explorer and biologist Jean Guillaume Bruguière (1750–1798). Recently, the eighth taxa of Bruguiera, B. × dungarra (a previously undescribed hybrid species between B. exaristata and B. gymnorhiza) was recognised as occurring in northern Australia.

== List of species ==
Five species are accepted.

- Bruguiera cylindrica (L.) Blume
- Bruguiera exaristata Ding Hou
- Bruguiera gymnorhiza (L.) Lam.
- Bruguiera parviflora (Roxb.) Wight & Arn. ex Griff.
- Bruguiera sexangula (Lour.) Poir.

=== Hybrids ===
- Bruiguiera × dungarra N.C.Duke & Hidet.Kudo (B. exaristata × B. gymnorhiza)
- Bruguiera × hainesii C.G.Rogers (B. gymnorhiza × B. cylindrica)
- Bruguiera × rhynchopetala (W.C.Ko) N.C.Duke & X.J.Ge (B. gymnorhiza × B. sexangula)

=== Formerly placed here ===
- Bruguiera arnottiana Wight ex Arn. synonym of Ceriops tagal (Perr.) C.B.Rob.
- Bruguiera candel Steud. synonym of Kandelia candel Wight & Arn.
- Bruguiera decandra Griff. synonym of Ceriops decandra (Griff.) W.Theob.
- Bruguiera decangulata Griff. synonym of Rhizophora mangle L.
- Bruguiera timoriensis Wight & Arn. synonym of Ceriops tagal (Perr.) C.B.Rob.
- Bruguiera littorea Steud. synonym of Lumnitzera littorea (Jack) Voigt
- Bruguiera madagascariensis DC. synonym of Lumnitzera racemosa var. racemosa
- Bruguiera nemorosa Blanco synonym of Carallia brachiata (Lour.) Merr.
- Bruguiera obtusa Steud. synonym of Lumnitzera racemosa var. racemosa

== See also ==
- Mangroves
