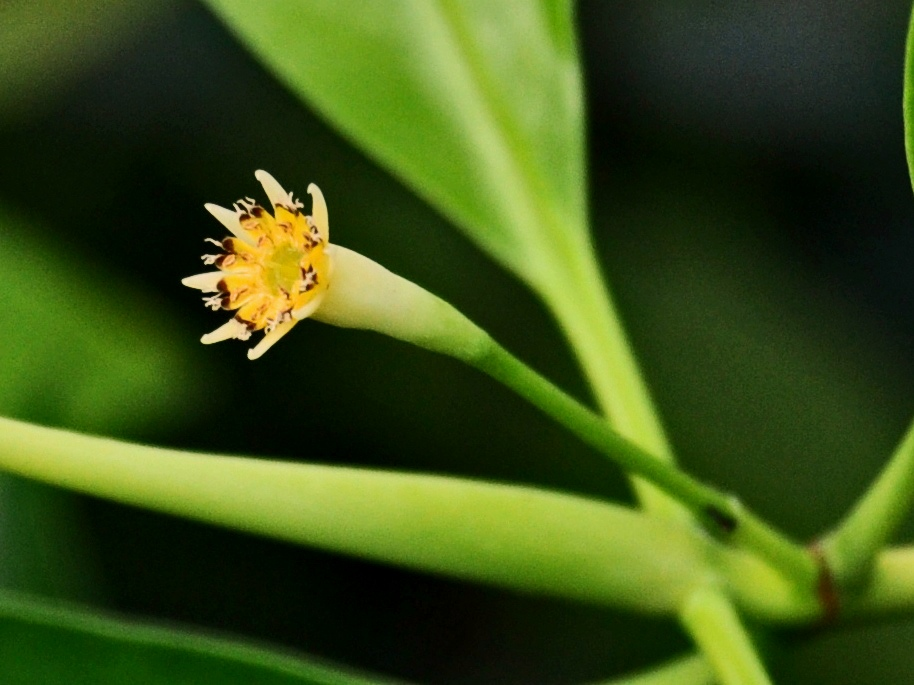

Conservation status
- Least Concern (IUCN 3.1)

Scientific classification
- Kingdom: Plantae
- Clade: Tracheophytes
- Clade: Angiosperms
- Clade: Eudicots
- Clade: Rosids
- Order: Malpighiales
- Family: Rhizophoraceae
- Genus: Bruguiera
- Species: B. parviflora

Binomial name
- Bruguiera parviflora (Roxb.) Wight & Arn. ex Griff.

Synonyms
- Bruguiera ritchiei Merr.; Kanilia parviflora (Roxb.) Blume; Rhizophora parviflora Roxb.; Rhizophora pauciflora Griff.

= Bruguiera parviflora =

Species of tree

Bruguiera parviflora is a tree in the family Rhizophoraceae. The specific epithet parviflora is from the Latin meaning 'small flowers'.

== Description ==
Bruguiera parviflora grows up to 30 metres (100 ft) tall with a trunk diameter of up to 45 centimetres (18 in). The bark is pale grey to pale brown. The fruits measure up to 4 cm (2 in) long. The wood is sometimes used as charcoal or firewood.

== Distribution and habitat ==
Bruguiera parviflora grows widely in South Asia, Indochina, Malesia and northern Australia. Its habitat is mangrove areas and the species faces similar threats to those generally affecting mangrove habitats, such as coastal development, pollution and climate change.

== Gallery ==
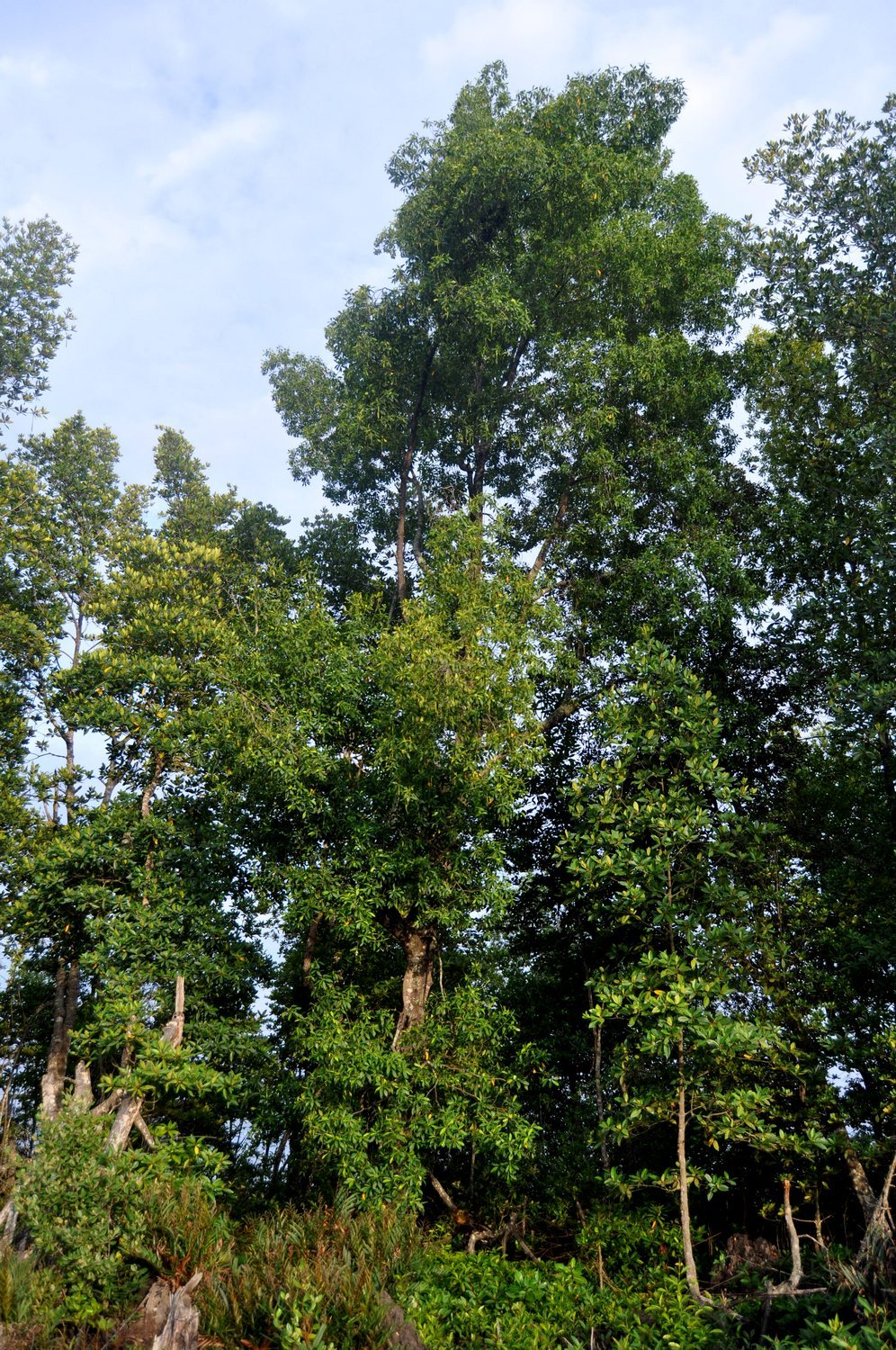
Bruguiera parviflora

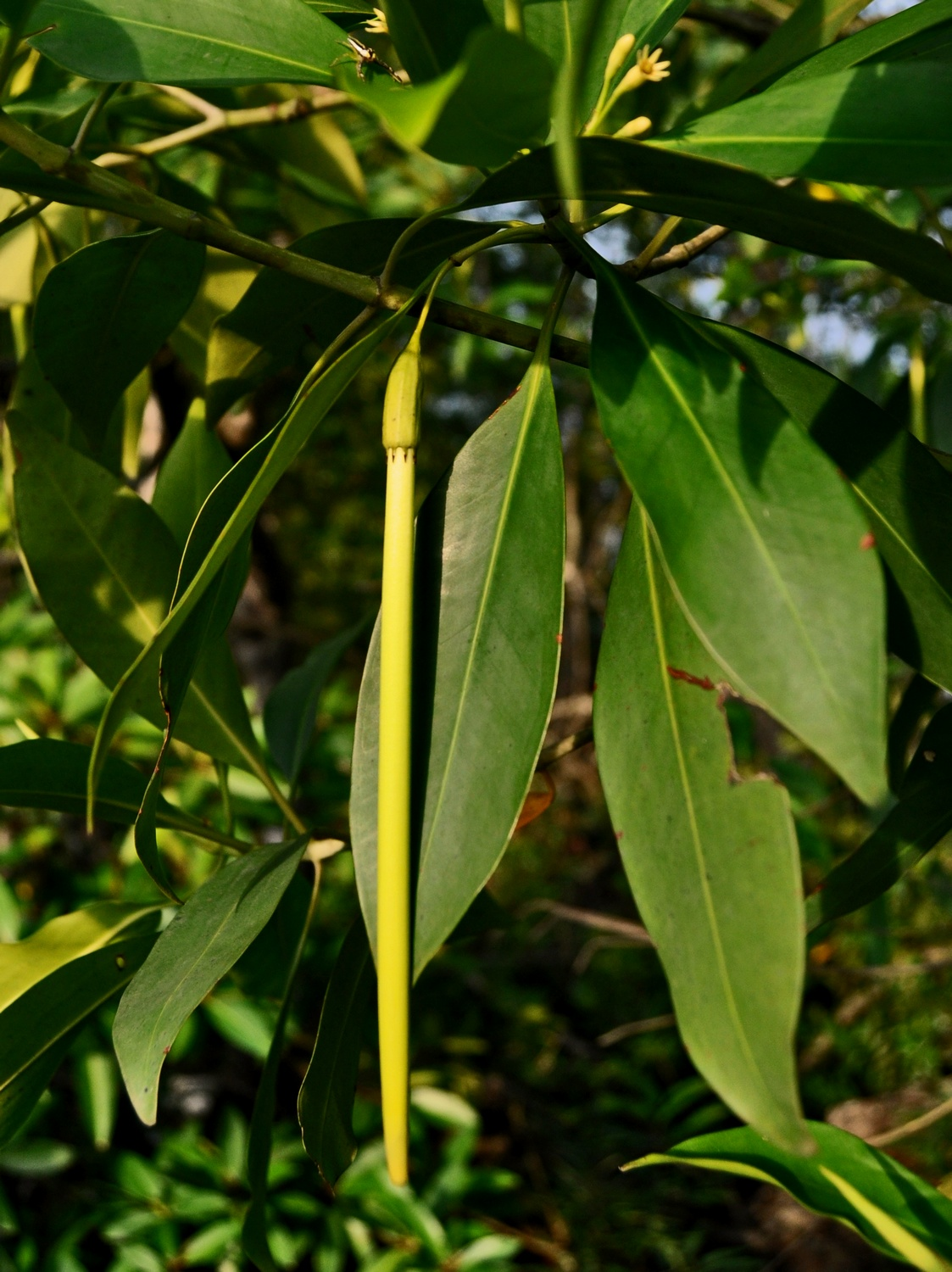
Fruit with hypocotyl
