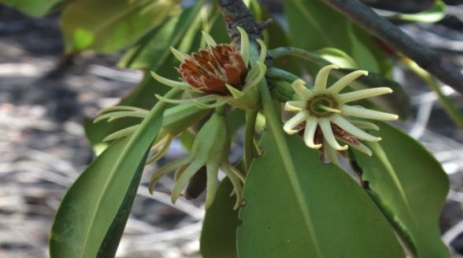
- Flowers

Scientific classification
- Kingdom: Plantae
- Clade: Tracheophytes
- Clade: Angiosperms
- Clade: Eudicots
- Clade: Rosids
- Order: Malpighiales
- Family: Rhizophoraceae
- Genus: Bruguiera
- Species: B. exaristata

Binomial name
- Bruguiera exaristata Ding Hou

Synonyms
- Bruguiera eriopetala var. exsetata Valeton

= Bruguiera exaristata =

Species of flowering plant

Bruguiera exaristata, commonly known as the rib-fruited mangrove or rib-fruited orange mangrove, is a mangrove of the family Rhizophoraceae.

The species is pollinated by birds. The species also contains tropine esters of acetic, benzoic, n-butyric, isobutyric, propionic, and isovaleric acids. The tropane alkaloid brugine is found in the bark of this species.

== Description ==
Bruguiera exaristata is a mangrove, forming mangrove swamps of small trees or shrubs with self-supporting growth in shallow saline or brackish water.

== Distribution ==
It is native to Lesser Sunda Islands, New Guinea and Northern Australia. It can be found along the coast at the mouth of the De Grey River, but it is rare in North West Cape.
