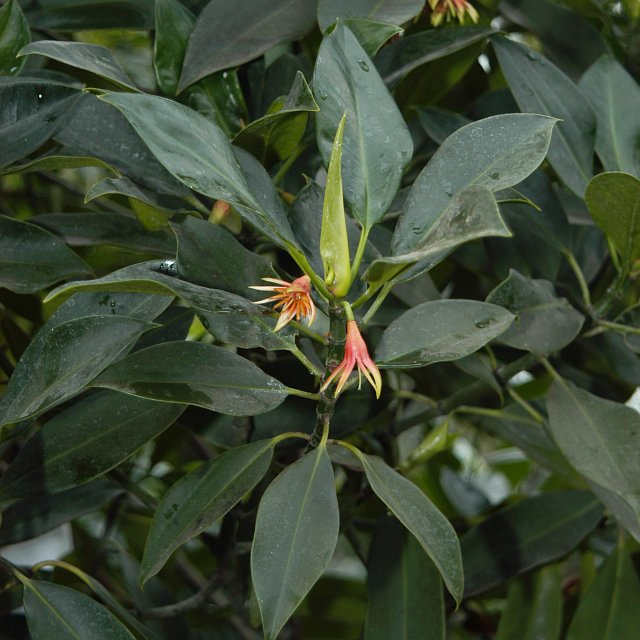

Conservation status
- Least Concern (IUCN 3.1)

Scientific classification
- Kingdom: Plantae
- Clade: Tracheophytes
- Clade: Angiosperms
- Clade: Eudicots
- Clade: Rosids
- Order: Malpighiales
- Family: Rhizophoraceae
- Genus: Bruguiera
- Species: B. gymnorhiza

Binomial name
- Bruguiera gymnorhiza (L.) Lam.

Synonyms
- Bruguiera capensis Blume; Bruguiera conjugata (L.) Merr.; Bruguiera conjugata f. alba Stone; Bruguiera gymnorhiza f. alba (Stone) Fosberg; Bruguiera gymnorhiza var. palun Blume; Bruguiera rheedei Blume; Bruguiera rumphii Blume; Bruguiera wightii Blume; Bruguiera zippelii Blume; Bruguiera zippelii var. oblongifolia Blume; Rhizophora conjugata L.; Rhizophora palun DC.; Rhizophora rheedei Steud.; Rhizophora tinctoria Blanco

= Bruguiera gymnorhiza =

Species of tree

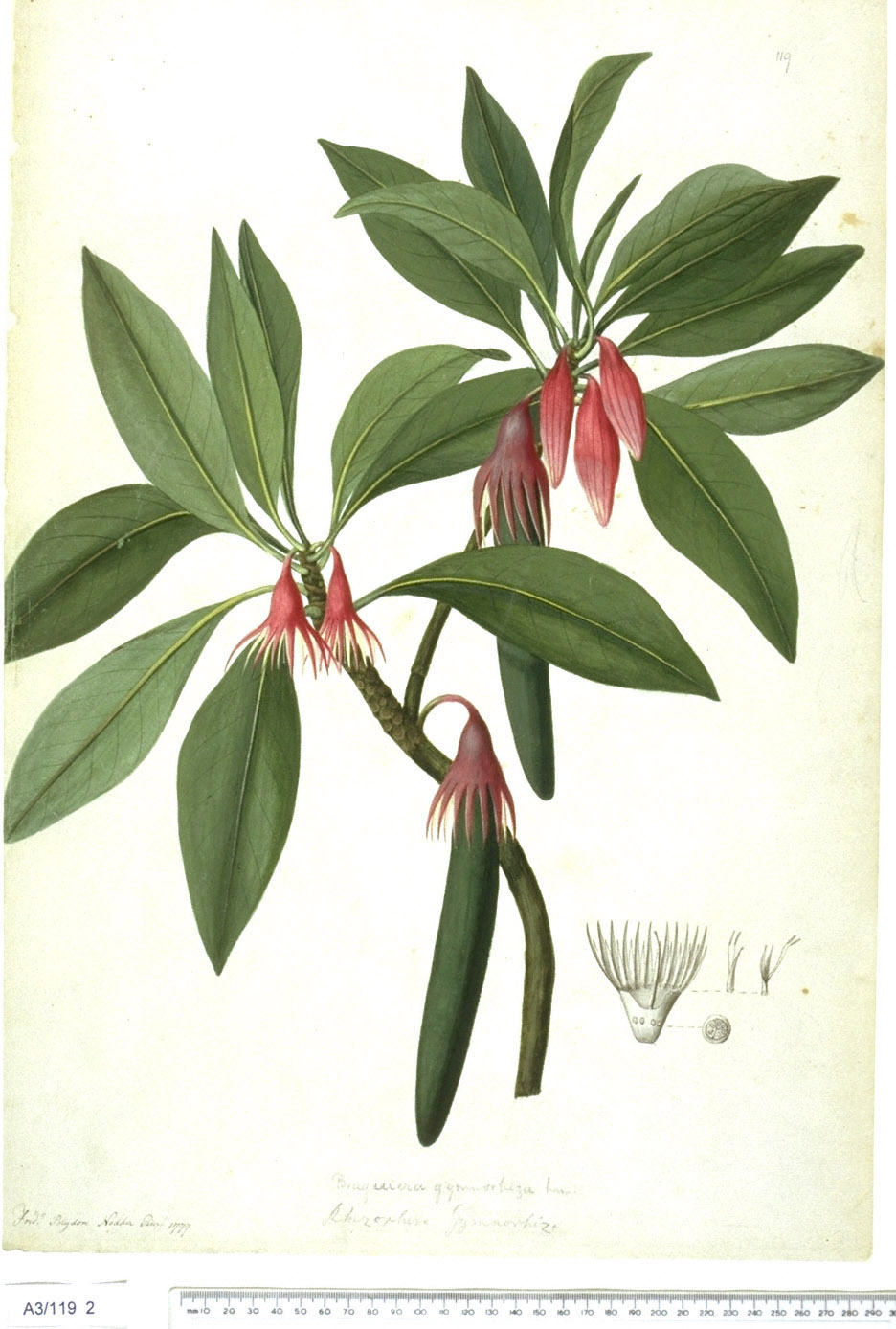

Bruguiera gymnorhiza, the large-leafed orange mangrove or oriental mangrove, is a mangrove tree that grows usually to 7–20 metres (23–66 ft) high, but sometimes up to 35 m (115 ft), that belongs to the family Rhizophoraceae. It is found on the seaward side of mangrove swamps, often in the company of Rhizophora. It grows from the Western Pacific across Indian Ocean coasts to Cape Province, South Africa.

== Description ==
A tree that can grow up to 35 m (115 ft), though usually smaller, around 7–20 m (23–66 ft), it has a glabrous, smoothish trunk with reddish-brown bark that is sometimes fibrous, sometimes lightish brown or grey. The tree develops short prop-roots rather than long stilt-roots. The green elliptic leaves are 5–15 cm (2.0–5.9 in) long. Flowers are solitary, with white or cream petals, that soon turn brown up to 1.5 cm (0.59 in) long, pinkish-green to reddish brown calyx. The fruit are turbinate (spinning-top shaped), 2 cm (0.79 in) long, when mature, the spindle-shaped fruits drop and become embedded in the mud in an upright position, where they rapidly develop roots. The seeds, when still on tree, have a hypocotyl up to 11 cm (4.3 in) long.

== Distribution ==
The tree is found as a native on the coasts of places bordering the Indian Ocean, the South China Sea, and parts of the western Pacific Ocean. Regions that it is native to include: Caroline Island, Samoa, Tonga, Wallis and Futuna, Fiji, Marshall Islands, Gilbert Islands, Nauru, Vanuatu, Solomon Islands, Queensland, New Guinea, Northern Territory, Lesser Sunda Islands, Sulawesi, Nansei-shoto, Borneo, Jawa, Hainan, Christmas Island, Southeast China, Cambodia, Vietnam, Sumatra, Peninsular Malaysia, Thailand, Myanmar, Bangladesh, Nicobar Islands, Andaman Islands, India (including Andhra Pradesh), Sri Lanka, Maldives, Mauritius, Madagascar, Aldabra, Seychelles, Somalia, Djibouti, Kenya, Mozambique Channel Islands, Tanzania, Mozambique, KwaZulu-Natal, Cape Provinces.

It has become extinct in Taiwan, and is naturalized in Hawaii.

== Habitat ==
The tree grows on intertidal mud-flats and estuaries, 0–2 m (0.0–6.6 ft) (the elevation range between mean sea level and highest tide), on the less exposed parts of the coast, with a rainfall of 1,000–8,000 mm (39–315 in). Common associates on Pacific Island include other mangrove species. The species grows on a wide range of soils, but does best in river estuaries. Salt water habitats on an alluvial sediment allows the tree to spread with its adventitious roots. The black mangrove is a protected tree in South Africa.

== Names ==
As well as its botanical name, the tree is known by many common, or vernacular names. These include: Tongan: tongo; Marshall Islands jon; Kosrae sraol; Pohnpei sohmw; Chuuk ong; Yap yangach; northern Australia orange mangrove; Wanigela, Northern (Oro) Province, Papua New Guinea kavela, mangrove bean.; Thyanhngayth dialect, Awngthim language nhomb; Sapek people, Supiori, Papua Province, Indonesia arouw Batjamal benmerr; Emi kunyme; Palau denges; Indonesian: putut; Malay: pokok tumu merah; Chinese: 木榄; Yue Chinese 木欖; Khmer prâsak' nhi, prâsak' toch, prâsak' tük; Thai: พังกาหัวสุมดอกแดง; Bengali: কাঁকড়া গাছ; Telugu (Andhra Pradesh) thuddu ponna, uredi; Malayalam: പേനക്കണ്ടൽ; Maldives bodu kaṇḍū, boda vaki.; Kiswahili (Kenya, Tanzania, including Zanzibar, Mozambique) muia, mkoko wimbi; Zulu: isihlobane; Xhosa: isikhangati; Afrikaans: swart-wortelboom; South African English black mangrove; English large-leafed mangrove, oriental mangrove; Japanese: オヒルギ; Russian: Бругиера голокорневая

== Uses ==
A major use of the tree is for wood products. Its uses in agroforestry include a woodlot, mulch/organic matter production, soil stabilization, coastal protection, windbreak, wildlife/marine food and habitat and bee forage. The wood is widely used, including for firewood, building construction (including structural components such as poles, beams and rafters), canoe parts, fishingstakes, spears, copra-huskers, chips for pulp production, tool handles and digging sticks. In the Andaman Islands, the trunks have been used for telephone and transmission poles, it seems rot-resistant (i.e. durable in direct contact with the ground). The wood has a high calorific values, and is used as fuel on some Pacific Islands (e.g. Kosrae), and for charcoal production in Indonesia, and Cambodia. In the Marshall Islands, it has been used for keel-pieces (maal), outrigger (kie), and outrigger struts (kein-eon erre). Paddles are also made from the wood on some islands.

The fruit (propagule/hypocotyl) is reported as being eaten after scraping/grating, washing, drying and cooking to remove tannins, and sometimes mixed with coconut in Melanesia and Nauru. The fruit is sold as a vegetable at Honiara Market, Solomon Islands. For the Sowek people, living on Supiori Island, Papua Province, Indonesia, the fruit is a staple, or primary food, of their diet, due to its high carbohydrate content.

The bark is used as an abortifacient and for treating burns in the Solomon Islands. The bark is reported to be used for diarrhoea and fever in Indonesia. The astringent (and mildly toxic) bark has also been used to treat malaria in Cambodia. The fruits has antiviral properties, and bark extracts of the closely related Bruguiera sexangula are reportedly active against at least two types of cancerous tumors (Sarcoma 180 and Lewis lung carcinoma). The bark is used for dying, with colours ranging from red-brown to black (requires repeated dying). For working with leather, the bark has a high tannin content, but tends to colour excessively unless collected "at the end of each growing season".

The green propagules/hypocotyl are also eaten by many indigenous groups in northern Australia. For example, on northwestern Cape York Peninsula, in the Weipa region, Thaynakwithi people (also referred to as Thyanhngayth dialect, Awngthim language people) call the species nhomb and explain that the propagules could be baked, then mashed or pounded and the flesh placed into a sieve-like woven bag before being soaked in water.

Amongst the people of Wanigela, Northern (Oro) Province, in southeastern Papua New Guinea, the cooked hypocotyls are eaten, providing one of their staples, and used in the ethnomedicine as antimicrobial and insecticidal.

The Batjamal and Emi speaker of the Wadjiginy language, who live near Anson Bay in the Northern Territory, Australia, use the durable and hard wood to make spear tips (batjagada [Batjama], ijinde [Emi]), with a Bambusa arnhemica shaft.

The reddish fine-textured wood is used for local building in Cambodia, such constructions as huts, wharfs, fences, and fishery structures. Charcoal from the wood is excellent. The bark is used to dye fishing nets, and to tan animal skins. A decoction of the bark is taken in to combat diarrhoea.

There is evidence of the hypocotyls being eaten in India, Bangladesh, and other parts of Southeast Asia.

In the Maldives the propagules or green pods are eaten as a cooked vegetable. They are peeled first and then boiled, the water being discarded and renewed at least four times. The propagules of this species are more appreciated than those of Bruguiera cylindrica.
