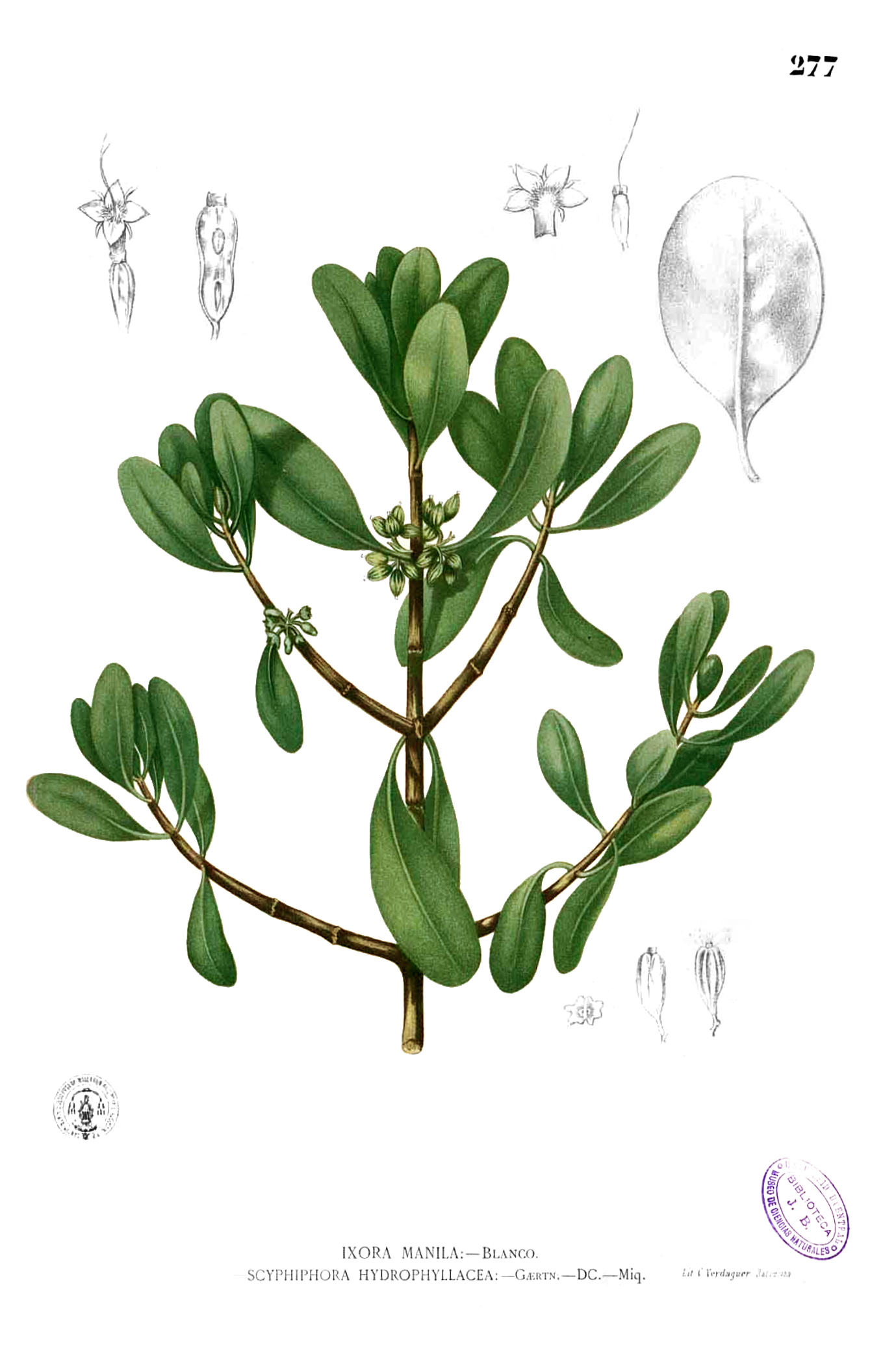
- Scyphiphora hydrophylacea

Scientific classification
- Kingdom: Plantae
- Clade: Tracheophytes
- Clade: Angiosperms
- Clade: Eudicots
- Clade: Asterids
- Order: Gentianales
- Family: Rubiaceae
- Subfamily: Ixoroideae
- Tribe: Scyphiphoreae
- Genus: Scyphiphora; C.F.Gaertn.
- Species: S. hydrophylacea

Binomial name
- Scyphiphora hydrophylacea C.F.Gaertn.

Synonyms
- Epithinia Jack

= Scyphiphora =

Genus of plants

Scyphiphora is a monotypic genus of flowering plants in the family Rubiaceae. It is the only genus in the tribe Scyphiphoreae. The genus contains only one species, viz. Scyphiphora hydrophylacea, which has a large distribution range from India, to tropical Asia and the western Pacific. It is a shrub of about 3 m (10 ft) and is often found in mangrove forests or sandy beaches.

This flora has many local common names in Asia, such as Nilad or Sagasa in the Philippines. Also, it is called Ngam in Thailand, Côi in Vietnam, and Chen—ngam in Malaysia.

== Description ==
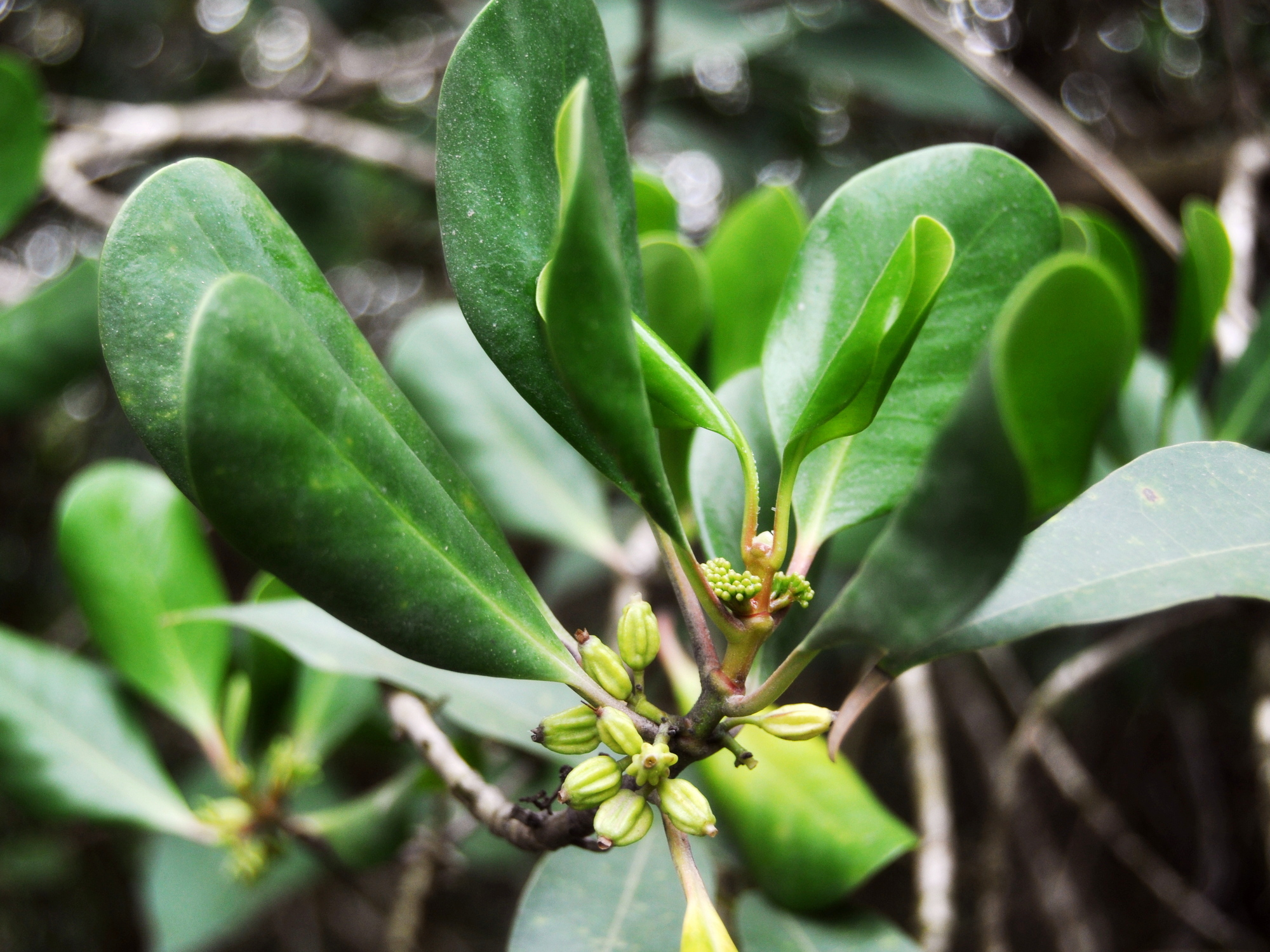
Fruiting twig

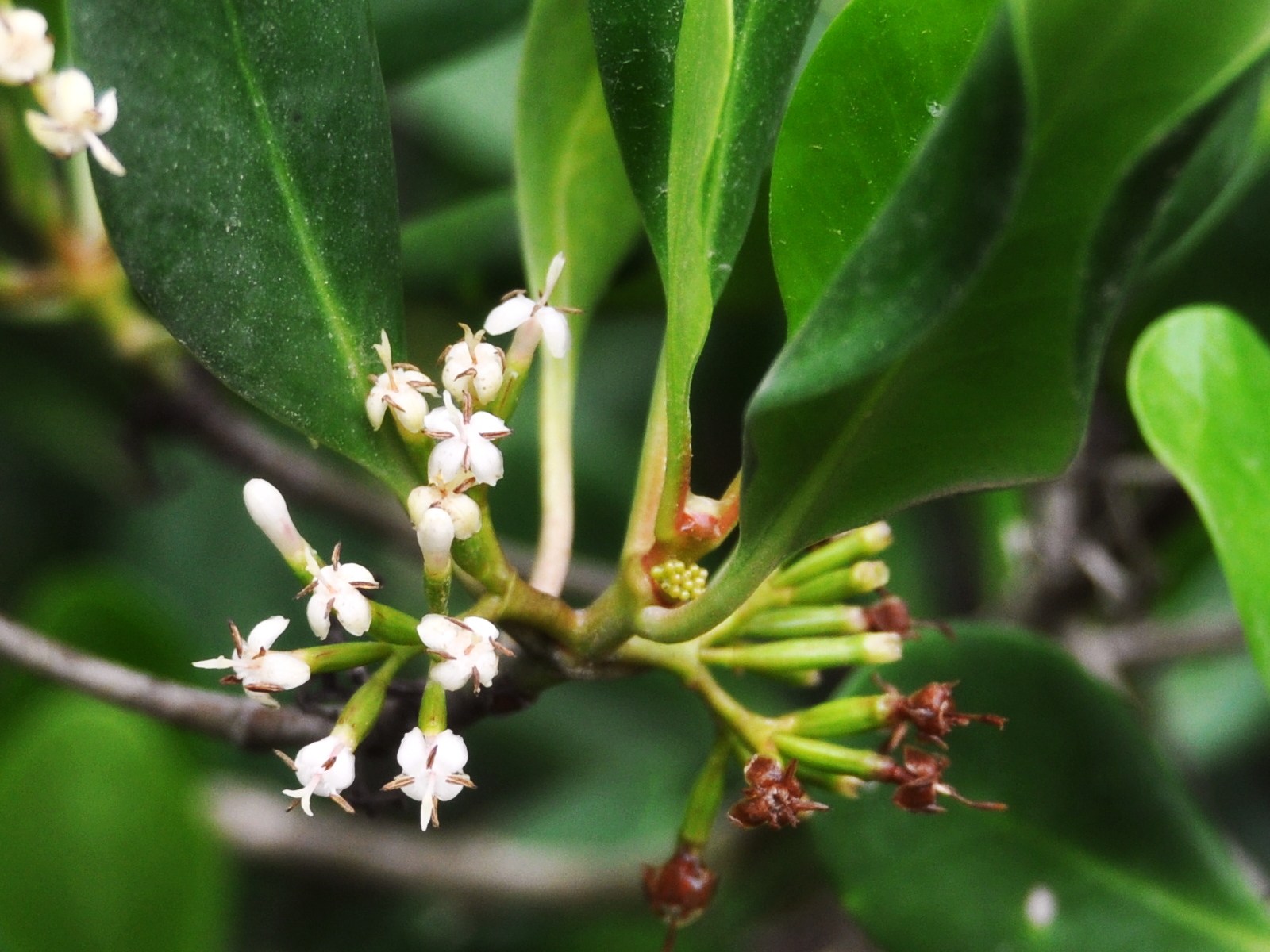
Flowers

Its leaves are opposite. The leaf blades are broad and drop-shaped. Its terminal buds and young leaves are coated with a varnish-like substance. The flowers are tubular and have four white lobes that are tinged pink. They are arranged in dense clusters. The fruits are elliptic and deeply ridged, becoming light brown and buoyant when ripe.

== Uses ==
Its dark brown wood can be used to craft small objects. Leaf extracts are known to be helpful for stomach aches. The flowers can be used as a cleansing or laundry whitening agent.

== Culture ==
One popular etymology for Manila, the capital city of the Philippines, asserts that the city's name derives from this shrub, locally known as nilad.

== Chemistry ==
The plant contains friedelin, syringic acid, isoscopoletin, fraxetol, casuarinondiol and guaiacylglycerol-beta-ferulic acid ether.
