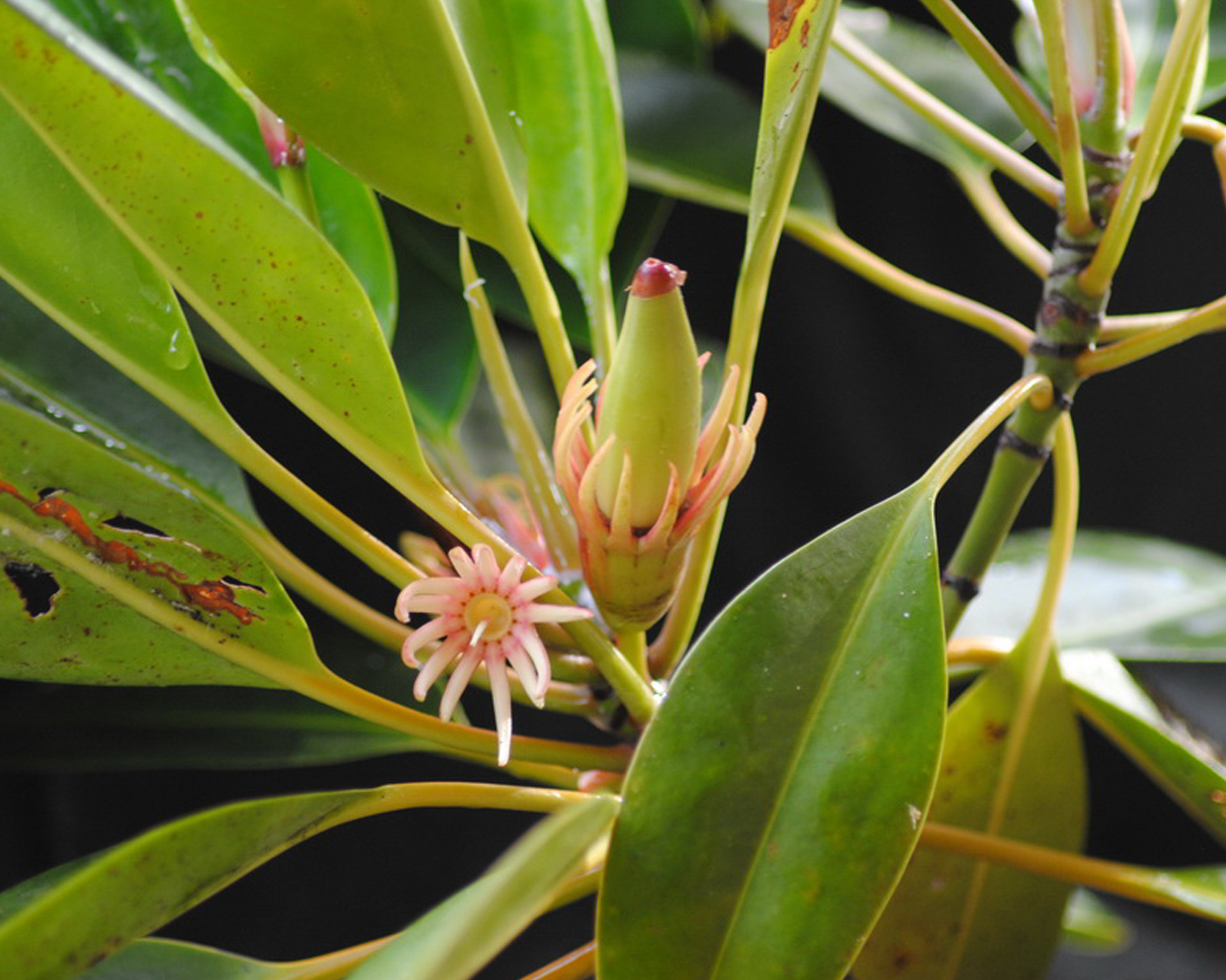

Conservation status
- Least Concern (IUCN 3.1)

Scientific classification
- Kingdom: Plantae
- Clade: Tracheophytes
- Clade: Angiosperms
- Clade: Eudicots
- Clade: Rosids
- Order: Malpighiales
- Family: Rhizophoraceae
- Genus: Bruguiera
- Species: B. sexangula

Binomial name
- Bruguiera sexangula (Lour.) Poir.

Synonyms
- Bruguiera australis A.Cunn. ex Arn.; Bruguiera eriopetala Wight & Arn.; Bruguiera oxyphylla Miq.; Bruguiera parietosa Griff.; Rhizophora australis (A.Cunn. ex Arn.) Steud.; Rhizophora eriopetala (Wight & Arn.) Steud.; Rhizophora polandra Blanco; Rhizophora sexangula Lour.

= Bruguiera sexangula =

Upriver orange mangrove

Species of flowering plant

Bruguiera sexangula is a species of flowering plant in the family Rhizophoraceae. It is sometimes referred to by the common name upriver orange mangrove. This mangrove shrub or tree grows up to 15 m, occasionally 30 m, in height.

== Description ==
Bruguiera sexangula may grow as a single-stemmed tree or multi-stemmed shrub. It has short buttresses at the base of the trunk, and knee-like air-breathing roots, or pneumatophores. The bark is a smooth grey-brown colour. The smooth, glossy green leaves are simple and opposite, elliptic to elliptic-oblong, 9.5–20 cm long, 3–7 cm wide, with a pointed apex and a 6 cm petiole, occurring in clusters at the end of the branches.

The flowers have a pale yellow-green to pinkish-orange calyx with 12–14 lobes, 20–24 stamens and 10–12 creamy-orange, bi-lobed petals. The green, cigar-shaped viviparous propagule grows from within the calyx and is 5–12 cm long and 1–2 cm wide.

== Distribution and habitat ==
This mangrove is distributed eastwards along the tropical coasts of Southeast Asia from India to northern Australia and New Caledonia. It is native to the Andaman Islands, Bangladesh, the Bismarck Archipelago, Borneo, Cambodia, Christmas Island, Hainan, India, Java, the Lesser Sunda Islands, Malaysia, the Maluku Islands, Myanmar, New Guinea, Northern Territory, the Philippines, Queensland, Sri Lanka, Sulawesi, Sumatra, Thailand, and Vietnam. It is found on various substrates usually in the upper reaches of river-mouth estuaries with high rainfall and significant freshwater inflow.

== Ecology ==
The large flowers of the mangrove are bird-pollinated. The petals are under tension and hold loose pollen; when the flower is probed, the pollen is released explosively over the head of the visiting bird.

== Uses ==
The mangrove has various traditional uses in Asia. The developing embryos and the fruits are cooked and eaten after soaking. Juice from the fruits is used to treat sore eyes, shingles and burns. The timber is heavy, hard and strong and is used as poles as well as for firewood and charcoal.
