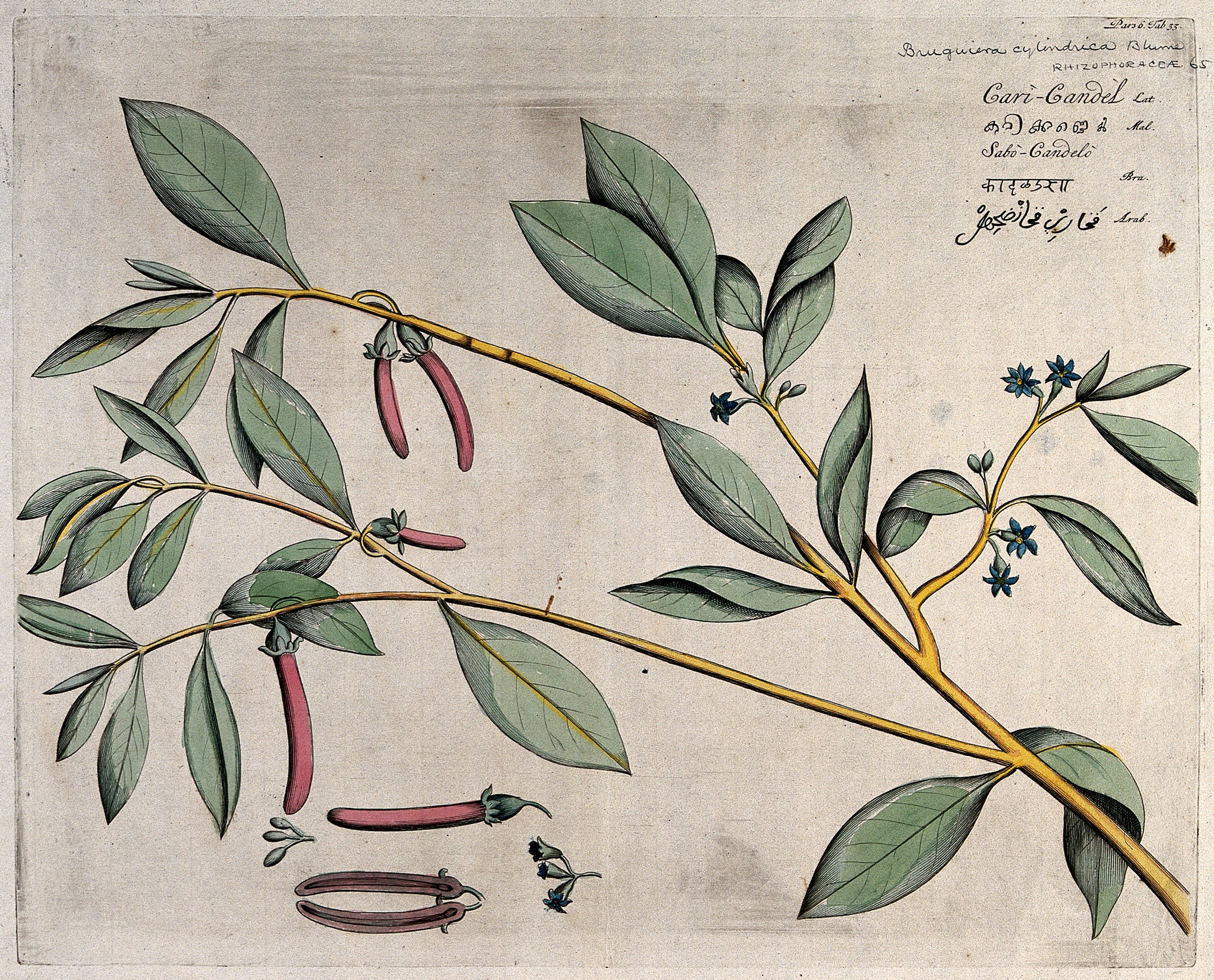

Conservation status
- Least Concern (IUCN 3.1)

Scientific classification
- Kingdom: Plantae
- Clade: Embryophytes
- Clade: Tracheophytes
- Clade: Spermatophytes
- Clade: Angiosperms
- Clade: Eudicots
- Clade: Rosids
- Order: Malpighiales
- Family: Rhizophoraceae
- Genus: Bruguiera
- Species: B. cylindrica

Binomial name
- Bruguiera cylindrica (L.) Blume

Synonyms
- Bruguiera caryophylloides (Burm.f.) Blume; Bruguiera malabarica Arn.; Kanilia caryophylloides Blume; Rhizophora caryophylloides Burm.f.; Rhizophora cylindrica L.

= Bruguiera cylindrica =

Species of flowering plant

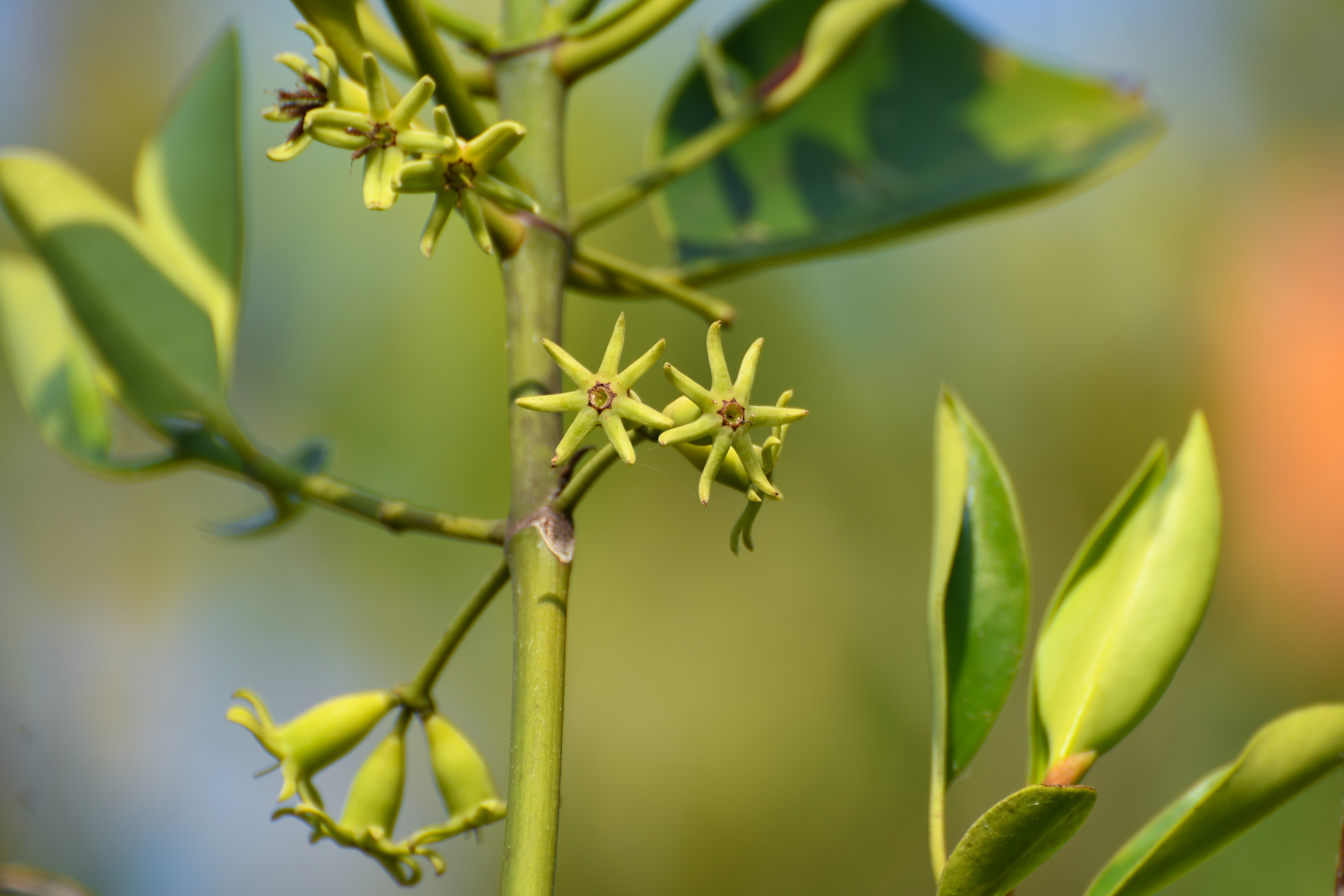
Flower of Bruguiera cylindrica in Kerala

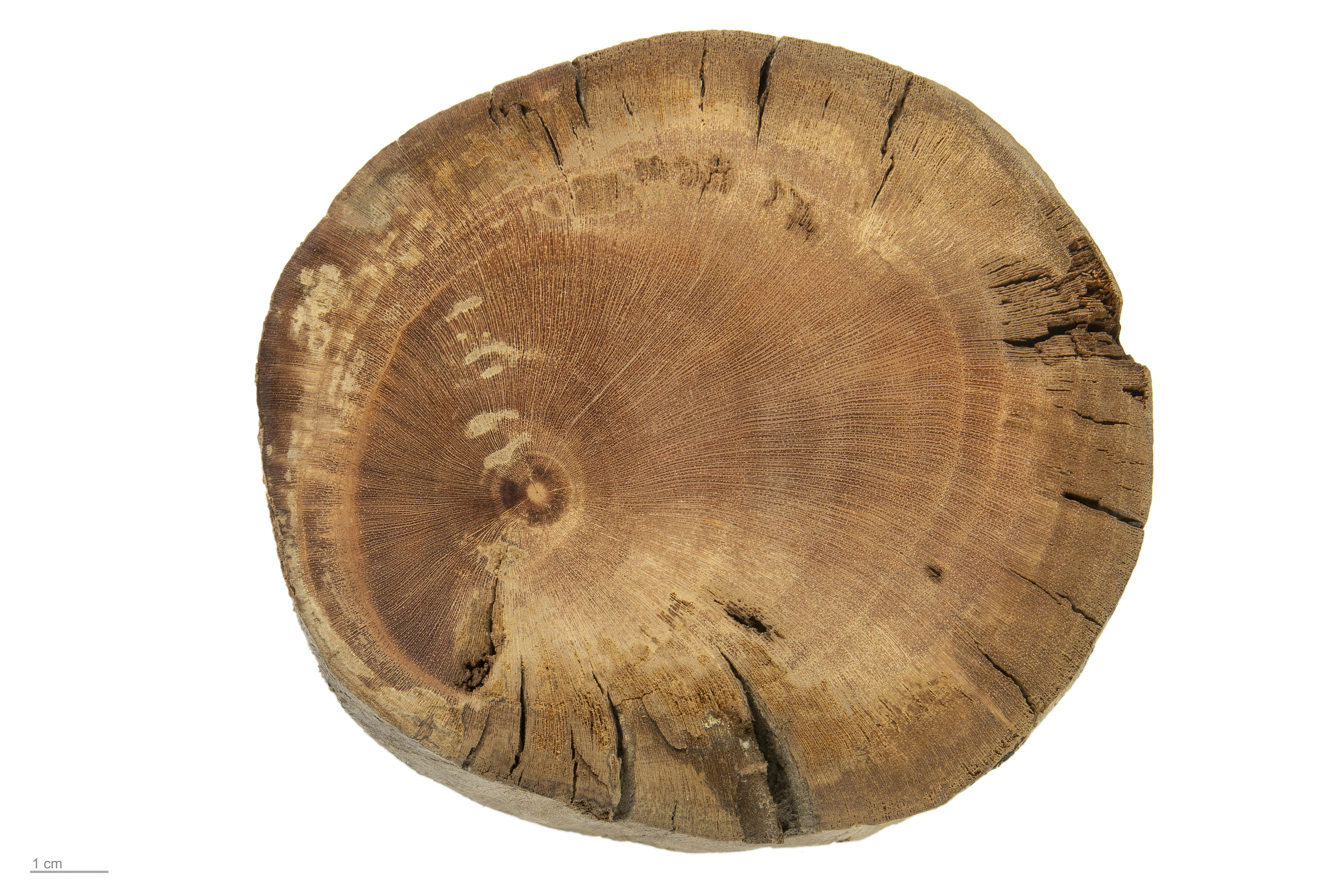
Bruguiera cylindrica (MHNT)

Bruguiera cylindrica is a small tree in the mangrove family Rhizophoraceae, native to tropical Asia and Australia. It was first described in 1827 and has the conservation status of least concern.

== Description ==
Bruguiera cylindrica is a small tree growing up to 20 metres (66 ft) tall but often grows as a bush. The bark is smooth and grey, with corky raised patches containing lenticels which are used in gas exchange and the trunk is buttressed by roots. The aerial roots or pneumatophores project from the soil in knee-shaped loops and have many lenticels which allow air into the interconnecting roots while excluding water. The roots spread out widely to provide stability in the waterlogged soil. The glossy green leaves are opposite, simple and elliptical with pointed ends. The flowers are in small bunches of 2–5 in the axils of the leaves. They have 8 long green sepals and 8 smaller, greenish-white petals with several little bristles on the tip. The flowers are pollinated by insects and release a cloud of pollen when probed at the base by the insect's mouthparts. The seed does not detach itself from the flower stalk but germinates where it is and is known as a propagule. It grows into a slightly curved cylinder up to 15 centimetres (5.9 in) long, with the upturned calyx still attached, and looks rather like a slender, dangling cucumber. The propagules later drop off and float horizontally at first. The roots (lower part) absorb water and become heavier and after a few weeks the propagules float vertically and are ready to root into the substrate.

Bruguiera cylindrica can be confused with Bruguiera gymnorhiza, but that has larger, red flowers and red sepals which remain attached to the propagule, which is a straight cylinder in shape rather than being slightly curved.

== Distribution and habitat ==
Bruguiera cylindrica is found in tropical Asia, from India and Sri Lanka through Malaysia, the Philippines, Thailand, Vietnam, Indonesia and New Guinea to Queensland, Australia. It is one of the commonest mangroves in Singapore. Bruguiera cylindrica is found on new deposits of silt, often behind other mangroves such as Avicennia which are more salt tolerant. Unlike some other mangroves, it does not regenerate easily from broken off branches.

== Ecology ==
A large number of species of marine fungi are found growing in mangrove swamps where Bruguiera cylindrica is one of a number of species colonised.

== Uses ==
The timber of Bruguiera cylindrica is dense, reddish and strong and is used in construction. It is used for parts of the hull and, especially, for the keel of canoes in the Maldive Islands. It burns well as firewood and can be converted into charcoal. The crushed bark has an unusual odour which is repulsive to fish and this wood is not therefore used for fish traps. Nevertheless, extracts are made from the pneumatophores which are used in the manufacture of perfume. Parts of the tree are eaten; the root tips are relished in Thailand; the bark supplies a spice and the young shoots are boiled and served as a vegetable. In Maldives the propagules are boiled and eaten as a vegetable in the islands where it grows.

In traditional medicine, the skin of the fruit is used to stop bleeding and the leaves are used to lower blood pressure.
