= Cassipourea fanshawei =

Conservation status
- Critically Endangered (IUCN 3.1)

Scientific classification
- Kingdom: Plantae
- Clade: Embryophytes
- Clade: Tracheophytes
- Clade: Spermatophytes
- Clade: Angiosperms
- Clade: Eudicots
- Clade: Rosids
- Order: Malpighiales
- Family: Rhizophoraceae
- Genus: Cassipourea
- Species: C. fanshawei

Binomial name
- Cassipourea fanshawei Torre & A.E.Gonç.

Species of flowering plant

Cassipourea fanshawei is a species of flowering plant in the Rhizophoraceae family. It is a shrub or tree endemic to Zambia.
