= Cassipourea swaziensis =

Conservation status
- Least Concern (IUCN 3.1)

Scientific classification
- Kingdom: Plantae
- Clade: Embryophytes
- Clade: Tracheophytes
- Clade: Spermatophytes
- Clade: Angiosperms
- Clade: Eudicots
- Clade: Rosids
- Order: Malpighiales
- Family: Rhizophoraceae
- Genus: Cassipourea
- Species: C. swaziensis

Binomial name
- Cassipourea swaziensis Compton

Species of tree

Cassipourea swaziensis (Swazi onionwood, Afrikaans: Swazi-uiehout) is a species of flowering plant in the Rhizophoraceae family. It is a shrub or tree found in KwaZulu-Natal Province of South Africa and Eswatini. It is threatened by habitat loss, and a protected tree in South Africa.
