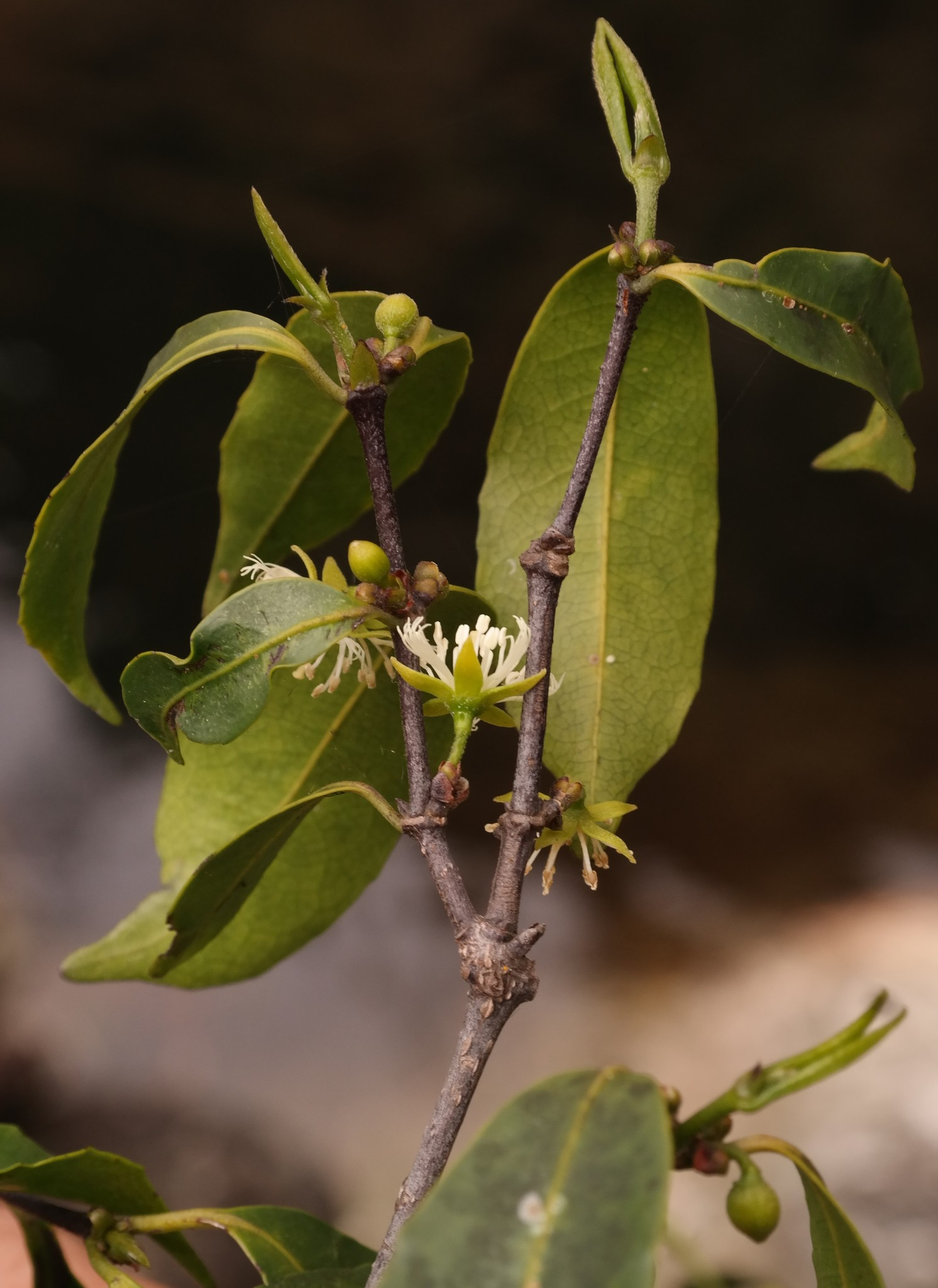

Conservation status
- Least Concern (IUCN 3.1)

Scientific classification
- Kingdom: Plantae
- Clade: Tracheophytes
- Clade: Angiosperms
- Clade: Eudicots
- Clade: Rosids
- Order: Malpighiales
- Family: Rhizophoraceae
- Genus: Cassipourea
- Species: C. malosana

Binomial name
- Cassipourea malosana (Baker) Alston

Synonyms
- Cassipourea abyssinica (Engl.) Alston; Cassipourea avettae (Chiov.) Alston; Cassipourea eickii (Engl.) Alston; Cassipourea elliottii (Engl.) Alston; Cassipourea gerrardii (Schinz) Alston; Weihea abyssinica Engl.; Weihea avettae Chiov.; Weihea boranensis Chiov.; Weihea eickii Engl.; Weihea elliottii Engl.; Weihea gerrardii Schinz; Weihea ilicifolia Brehmer; Weihea malosana Baker; Weihea salvago-raggei Chiov.

= Cassipourea malosana =

Species of flowering plant

Cassipourea malosana is a species of plant native to tropical Africa.

== Description ==
Cassipourea malosana is an evergreen shrub or tree, growing to 25 or 30 meters in height, and occasionally up to 45 meters, with a rounded crown. The tree has a straight unbuttressed trunk which can be up to 60 cm in diameter and unbranched up to 20 meters from the ground. The bark is smooth and pale. The leaves are lanceolate, 3 to 10 mm long and 1 to 5 mm wide, with a glossy upper surface and a matte underside.

== Distribution and habitat ==
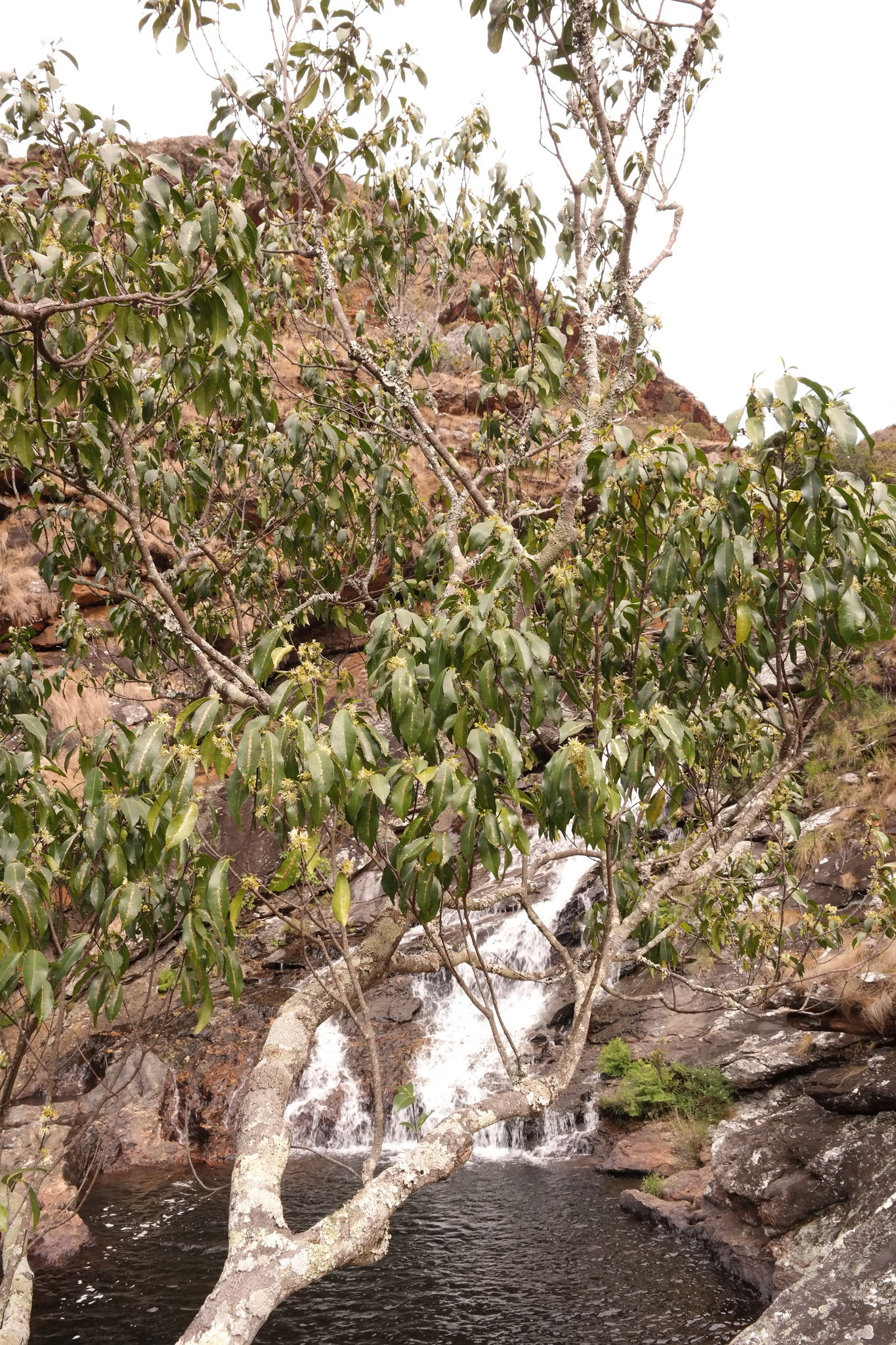
Cassipourea malosana at Digby's Falls, Chimanimani National Park, Zimbabwe.

Cassipourea malosana is native to the mountains of Eastern and Central Africa, from Eritrea through Ethiopia, Somalia, Kenya, Uganda, the eastern Democratic Republic of the Congo, Tanzania, Malawi, Mozambique, Eswatini, and South Africa. There is an outlier population in the Cameroon Highlands of Cameroon.

Cassipourea malosana is found in dry Afromontane forests, often with African juniper (Juniperus procera), Afrocarpus spp., Podocarpus spp., and Olea spp., and as an under-canopy tree in moist Afromontane forests. It is generally found between 1700 and 2600 meters elevation, and occasionally as low as 1100 meters.

== Uses ==
The tree has fine and even-textured wood, and produces hard and heavy timber. It is exploited artisanally and commercially in East Africa, and is usually harvested from the wild. It is also used for firewood.

The tree is occasionally grown as a shade or ornamental tree, and is planted in reforestation projects and for erosion control. Its flowers are a good source of nectar for bees.

The bark has some local medicinal uses. It is cooked in soups to restore strength, made into a tea to help remove a placenta after birth, and applied to skin to treat skin ailments and sunburn and to lighten skin.
