= Procalyptis parooptera =

Scientific classification
- Domain: Eukaryota
- Kingdom: Animalia
- Phylum: Arthropoda
- Class: Insecta
- Order: Lepidoptera
- Family: Tortricidae
- Genus: Procalyptis
- Species: P. parooptera

Binomial name
- Procalyptis parooptera (Turner, 1925)

Synonyms
- Capua parooptera Turner, 1925

Species of moth

Procalyptis parooptera is a species of moth of the family Tortricidae.

== Description ==
Procalyptis parooptera is found in Australia, where it has been recorded from Queensland.

The wingspan is 20.5-28 mm.

The larvae feed on the leaves of Ceriops species.
