= Cassipourea eketensis =

Conservation status
- Critically Endangered (IUCN 2.3)

Scientific classification
- Kingdom: Plantae
- Clade: Tracheophytes
- Clade: Angiosperms
- Clade: Eudicots
- Clade: Rosids
- Order: Malpighiales
- Family: Rhizophoraceae
- Genus: Cassipourea
- Species: C. eketensis

Binomial name
- Cassipourea eketensis Baker f.

Species of flowering plant

Cassipourea eketensis is a species of plant in the Rhizophoraceae family. It is endemic to Nigeria and grows in tropical rainforest. It is threatened by habitat loss.
