= Cassipourea elliptica =

Conservation status
- Endangered (IUCN 2.3)

Scientific classification
- Kingdom: Plantae
- Clade: Tracheophytes
- Clade: Angiosperms
- Clade: Eudicots
- Clade: Rosids
- Order: Malpighiales
- Family: Rhizophoraceae
- Genus: Cassipourea
- Species: C. elliptica

Binomial name
- Cassipourea elliptica (Sw.) Poir.

Synonyms
- Cassipourea alba Griseb.; Cassipourea belizensis Lundell; Cassipourea brittoniana Fawc. & Rendle; Cassipourea cubensis Urb.; Cassipourea elliptica var. alba (Griseb.) Griseb.; Cassipourea elliptica var. ovata Griseb.; Cassipourea elliptica var. parvifolia Stehlé; Cassipourea elliptica var. pauciserrata Griseb.; Cassipourea elliptica var. typica Stehlé; Cassipourea guianensis var. elliptica (Sw.) M.Gómez; Cassipourea guildingii Briq.; Cassipourea macrodonta Standl.; Cassipourea podantha Standl.; Endosteira oppositifolia Turcz.; Legnotis elliptica Sw.

Species of flowering plant

Cassipourea elliptica is a species of flowering plant in the Rhizophoraceae family. It is a shrub or tree native to the tropical Americas, ranging from eastern Mexico through Central America and the Caribbean to northern Brazil.

The species was first described as Legnotis elliptica by Olof Swartz in 1788. In 1811 Jean Louis Marie Poiret placed the species in genus Cassipourea as C. elliptica.
