= Cassipourea subcordata =

Conservation status
- Critically Endangered (IUCN 2.3)

Scientific classification
- Kingdom: Plantae
- Clade: Tracheophytes
- Clade: Angiosperms
- Clade: Eudicots
- Clade: Rosids
- Order: Malpighiales
- Family: Rhizophoraceae
- Genus: Cassipourea
- Species: C. subcordata

Binomial name
- Cassipourea subcordata Britton

Species of flowering plant

Cassipourea subcordata is a species of plant in the Rhizophoraceae family. It is endemic to Jamaica.
