= Pellacalyx symphiodiscus =

Conservation status
- Least Concern (IUCN 3.1)

Scientific classification
- Kingdom: Plantae
- Clade: Tracheophytes
- Clade: Angiosperms
- Clade: Eudicots
- Clade: Rosids
- Order: Malpighiales
- Family: Rhizophoraceae
- Genus: Pellacalyx
- Species: P. symphiodiscus

Binomial name
- Pellacalyx symphiodiscus Stapf

Species of tree

Pellacalyx symphiodiscus is a tree in the family Rhizophoraceae. The specific epithet symphiodiscus means 'fused disc', referring to the disc of the flower.

== Description ==
Pellacalyx symphiodiscus grows up to 25 m (80 ft) tall, with a trunk diameter of 40 cm (16 in). The smooth bark is brown. The leaves are oblong to obovate and measure up to 19 cm (7 in) long.

== Distribution and habitat ==
Pellacalyx symphiodiscus is endemic to Borneo. Its habitat is dipterocarp forests, to elevations of about 650 m (2,000 ft).
