= Pellacalyx cristatus =

Scientific classification
- Kingdom: Plantae
- Clade: Tracheophytes
- Clade: Angiosperms
- Clade: Eudicots
- Clade: Rosids
- Order: Malpighiales
- Family: Rhizophoraceae
- Genus: Pellacalyx
- Species: P. cristatus

Binomial name
- Pellacalyx cristatus Hemsl.

Species of tree

Pellacalyx cristatus is a tree in the family Rhizophoraceae. The specific epithet cristatus means 'crested', referring to the calyx.

== Description ==
Pellacalyx cristatus grows up to 10 m (33 ft) tall, with a stem diameter of 10 cm (4 in). The smooth bark is brown to yellow. The leaves are ovate to oblong and measure up to 17 cm (7 in) long.

== Distribution and habitat ==
Pellacalyx cristatus is endemic to Borneo. Its habitat is in hilly areas, to elevations of 900 m (3,000 ft).
