= Cassipourea obovata =

Conservation status
- Data Deficient (IUCN 3.1)

Scientific classification
- Kingdom: Plantae
- Clade: Tracheophytes
- Clade: Angiosperms
- Clade: Eudicots
- Clade: Rosids
- Order: Malpighiales
- Family: Rhizophoraceae
- Genus: Cassipourea
- Species: C. obovata

Binomial name
- Cassipourea obovata Alston

Species of flowering plant

Cassipourea obovata is a species of plant in the Rhizophoraceae family. It is endemic to Mozambique.
