= Cassipourea flanaganii =

Conservation status
- Vulnerable (IUCN 2.3)

Scientific classification
- Kingdom: Plantae
- Clade: Tracheophytes
- Clade: Angiosperms
- Clade: Eudicots
- Clade: Rosids
- Order: Malpighiales
- Family: Rhizophoraceae
- Genus: Cassipourea
- Species: C. flanaganii

Binomial name
- Cassipourea flanaganii (Schinz) Alston

Synonyms
- Weihea flanaganii Schinz

Species of flowering plant

Cassipourea flanaganii is a species of plant in the Rhizophoraceae family.

== Distribution ==
It is native to the Eastern Cape, KwaZulu-Natal, and Mpumalanga provinces of South Africa.

== Threat ==
It is threatened by habitat loss.
