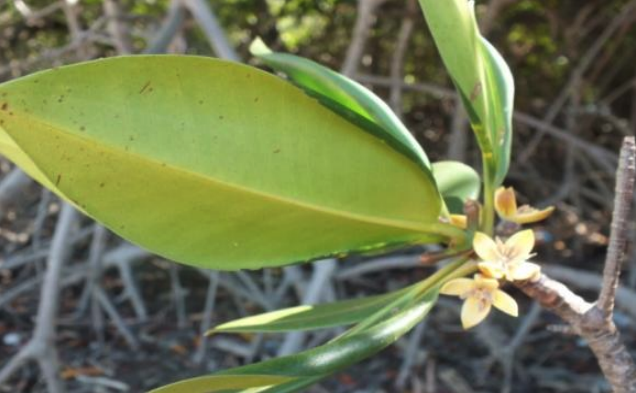
- Flowers

Conservation status
- Near Threatened (IUCN 3.1)

Scientific classification
- Kingdom: Plantae
- Clade: Tracheophytes
- Clade: Angiosperms
- Clade: Eudicots
- Clade: Rosids
- Order: Malpighiales
- Family: Rhizophoraceae
- Genus: Ceriops
- Species: C. decandra

Binomial name
- Ceriops decandra (Griff.) Ding Hou

Synonyms
- Bruguiera decandra Griff.; Ceriops roxburghiana Arn.

= Ceriops decandra =

Species of flowering plant

Ceriops decandra is a mangrove plant of tropical Asia in the family Rhizophoraceae. The specific epithet decandra is from the Greek meaning 'ten male', referring to the flower having ten stamens.

== Description ==
Ceriops decandra grows as a shrub or small tree up to 15 metres (50 ft) tall with a trunk diameter of up to 30 cm (12 in). Its bark is pale brown. The flowers are white. The ovoid to conical fruits measure up to 1.8 cm (0.7 in) long.

== Distribution and habitat ==
Ceriops decandra grows naturally in India and Bangladesh (including the Sundarbans), Myanmar, Thailand and Peninsular Malaysia. Its habitat is mangrove swamps and tidal creeks.
