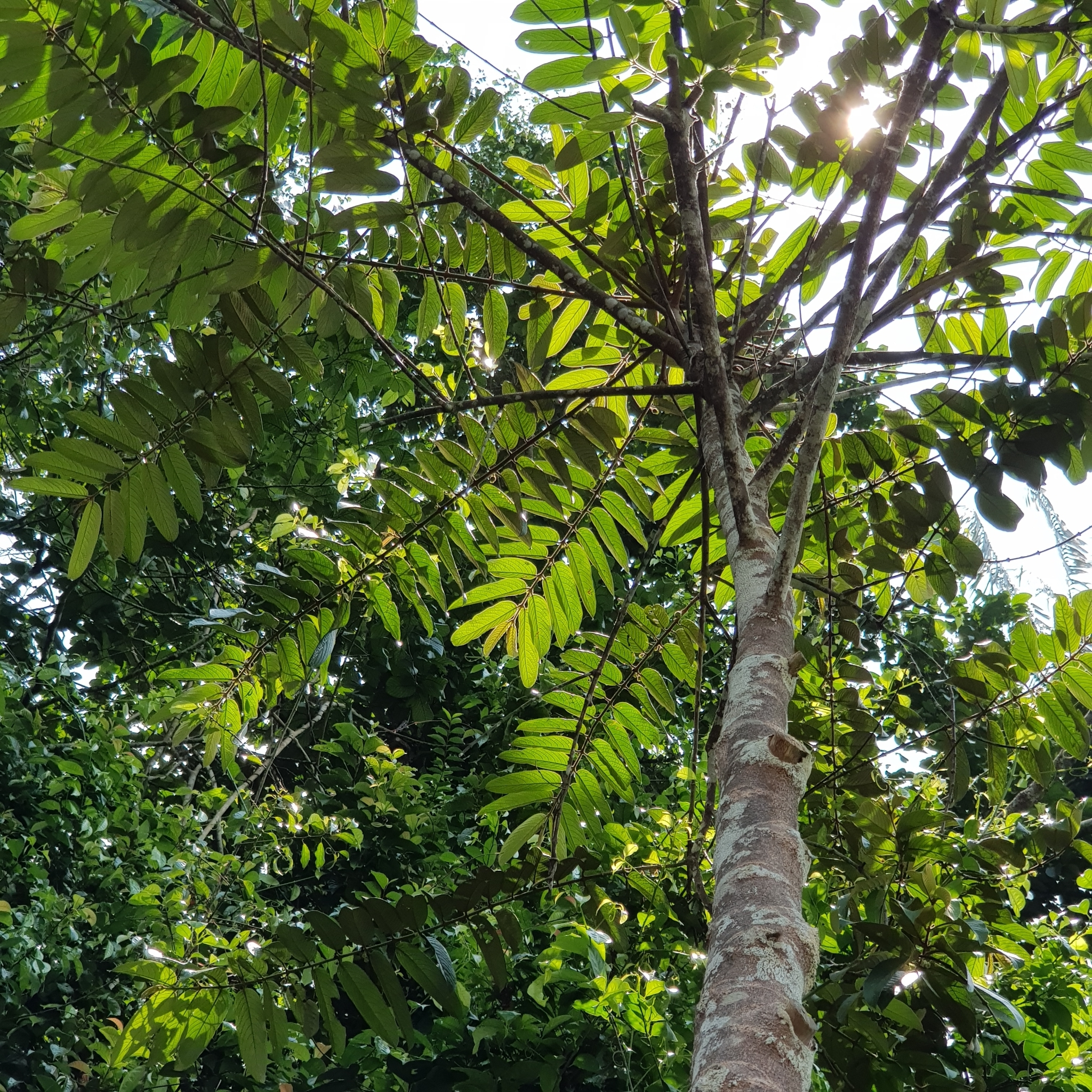
- In Singapore

Scientific classification
- Kingdom: Plantae
- Clade: Tracheophytes
- Clade: Angiosperms
- Clade: Eudicots
- Clade: Rosids
- Order: Malpighiales
- Family: Rhizophoraceae
- Genus: Pellacalyx
- Species: P. axillaris

Binomial name
- Pellacalyx axillaris Korth.

Synonyms
- Craterianthus fimbripetalus Valeton ex K.Heyne

= Pellacalyx axillaris =

Species of tree

Pellacalyx axillaris is a tree in the family Rhizophoraceae. The specific epithet axillaris means 'axillary', referring to the inflorescences.

== Description ==
Pellacalyx axillaris grows up to 25 m (80 ft) tall, with a trunk diameter of 60 cm (24 in). There may be buttresses, up to 60 cm (24 in) high. The leaves are elliptic to obovate and measure up to 6 cm (2.4 in) long. In swampy areas, the tree may develop mangrove-like roots. The wood is used in construction and as fuel.

== Distribution and habitat ==
Pellacalyx axillaris is native to Peninsular Malaysia, Borneo, Sumatra, the Philippines, Laos, Thailand and Myanmar. Its habitat is in lowland dipterocarp forests and in secondary forests, at elevations of 200–500 m (700–1,600 ft), often near rivers.
