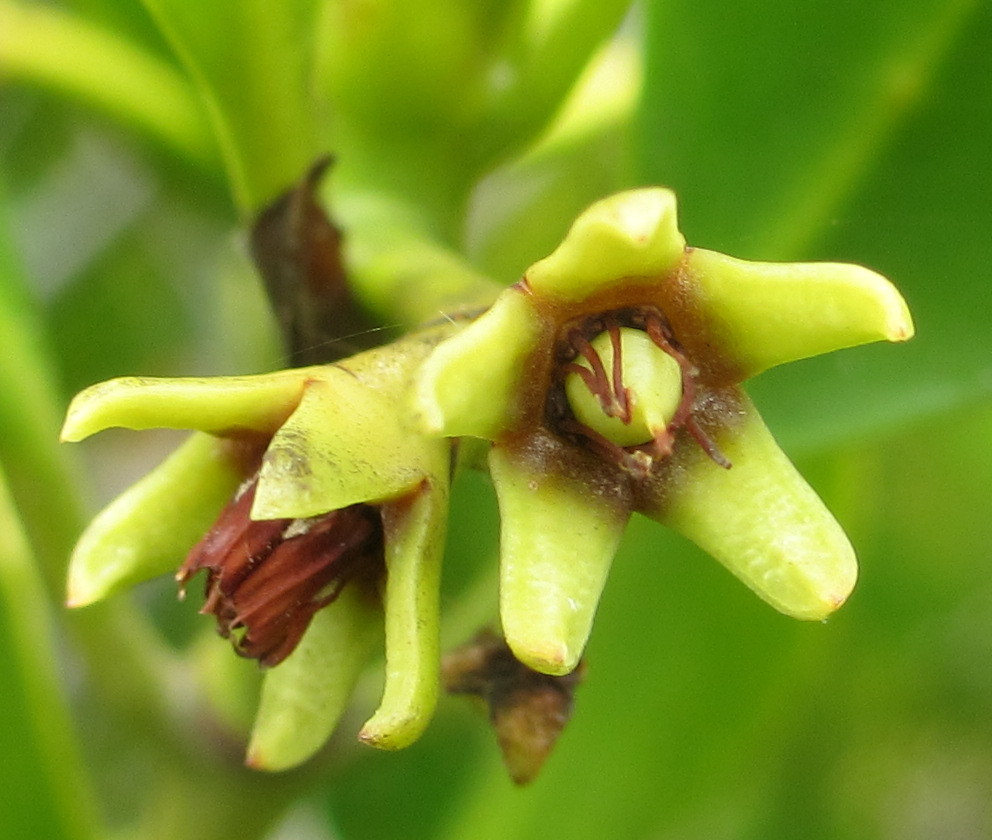
- In Mozambique

Conservation status
- Least Concern (IUCN 3.1)

Scientific classification
- Kingdom: Plantae
- Clade: Tracheophytes
- Clade: Angiosperms
- Clade: Eudicots
- Clade: Rosids
- Order: Malpighiales
- Family: Rhizophoraceae
- Genus: Ceriops
- Species: C. tagal

Binomial name
- Ceriops tagal (Perr.) C.B.Rob.

Synonyms
- List: Bruguiera arnottiana Wight ex Arn.; Bruguiera timoriensis Wight & Arn.; Ceriops boviniana Tul.; Ceriops candolleana Arn.; Ceriops candolleana var. sasakii Hayata; Ceriops candolleana var. spathulata Blume; Ceriops forsteniana Blume; Ceriops globulifera Boreau ex Tul.; Ceriops lucida Miq.; Ceriops lucida var. latifolia Miq.; Ceriops lucida var. subspathulata Miq.; Ceriops mossambicensis Klotzsch; Ceriops pauciflora Benth.; Ceriops somalensis Chiov.; Ceriops timoriensis Domin; Ceriops timoriensis (DC.) C.A.Gardner; Rhizophora timoriensis DC.; Rhizophora tagal Perr.

= Ceriops tagal =

Species of tree

Ceriops tagal, commonly known as spurred mangrove or Indian mangrove, is a mangrove tree species in the family Rhizophoraceae. It is a protected tree in South Africa. The specific epithet tagal is a plant name from the Tagalog language.

== Description ==
Ceriops tagal is a medium-sized tree growing to a height of 25 metres (80 ft) with a trunk diameter of up to 45 cm (18 in). The growth habit is columnar or multi-stemmed and the tree develops large buttress roots. The radiating anchor roots are sometimes exposed and may loop up in places. The bark is silvery-grey to orangish-brown, smooth with occasional pustular lenticels. The leaves are in opposite pairs, glossy yellowish-green above, obovate with entire margins, up to 6 cm (2.4 in) long and 3 cm (1.2 in) wide. The flowers are borne singly in the leaf axils; each has a long stalk and a short calyx tube, and parts in fives or sixes. The paired stamens are enclosed in the petals, which open explosively when disturbed. The ovoid fruits are up to 3 cm (1 in) long suspended from the shrunken calyx tube. Brown at first, they change colour as they mature and the hypocotyl emerges. The hypocotyl is long and slender, growing to about 35 cm (14 in) long, and is ribbed, a characteristic that distinguishes this mangrove from the smooth-fruited yellow mangrove (Ceriops australis).

== Distribution and habitat ==
Ceriops tagal grows naturally in eastern and southern Africa, Madagascar, Seychelles, India, Maldives, China, Indo-China, Malesia, Papuasia, the Caroline Islands, New Caledonia and Australia. Its habitat is in brackish water areas in tidal zones.

== Uses ==
The durable wood is used in house construction. It is also used in the manufacture of charcoal, and is favoured as firewood, being second only to Rhizophora spp., and a dye can be extracted from the bark. Among the mangrove species, its bark and sap yield red and black dyes, which are used in batik and tanning leather.

In the Philippines, the extracts (barok) from the dried bark (marka tungog or tangal) are used as bittering and fermenting agents for the traditional bahalina palm wines, giving them a deep brown-orange color and a bitter tangy aftertaste. It is also used to tan and dye leather.

== Gallery ==
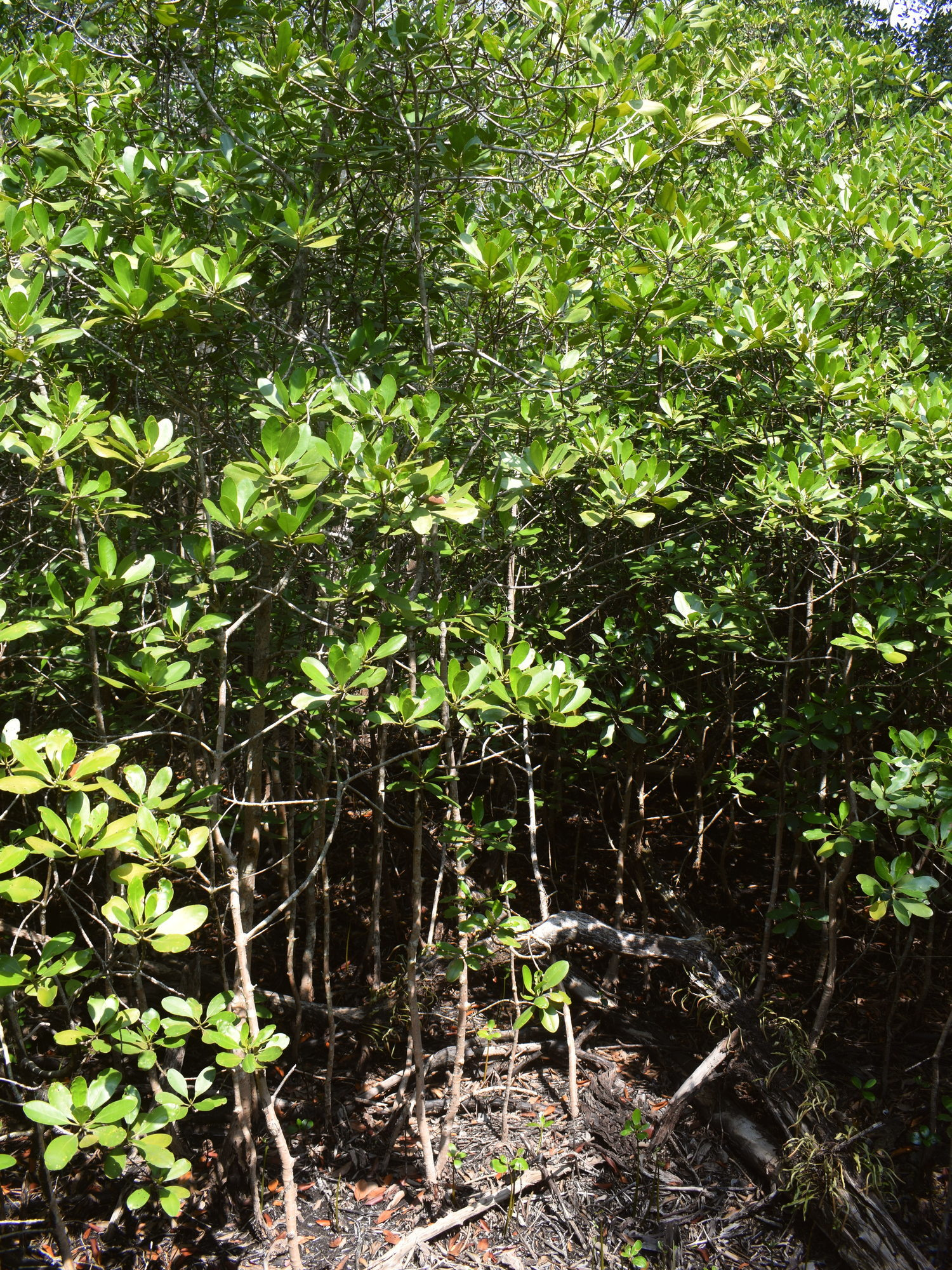
Growth habit

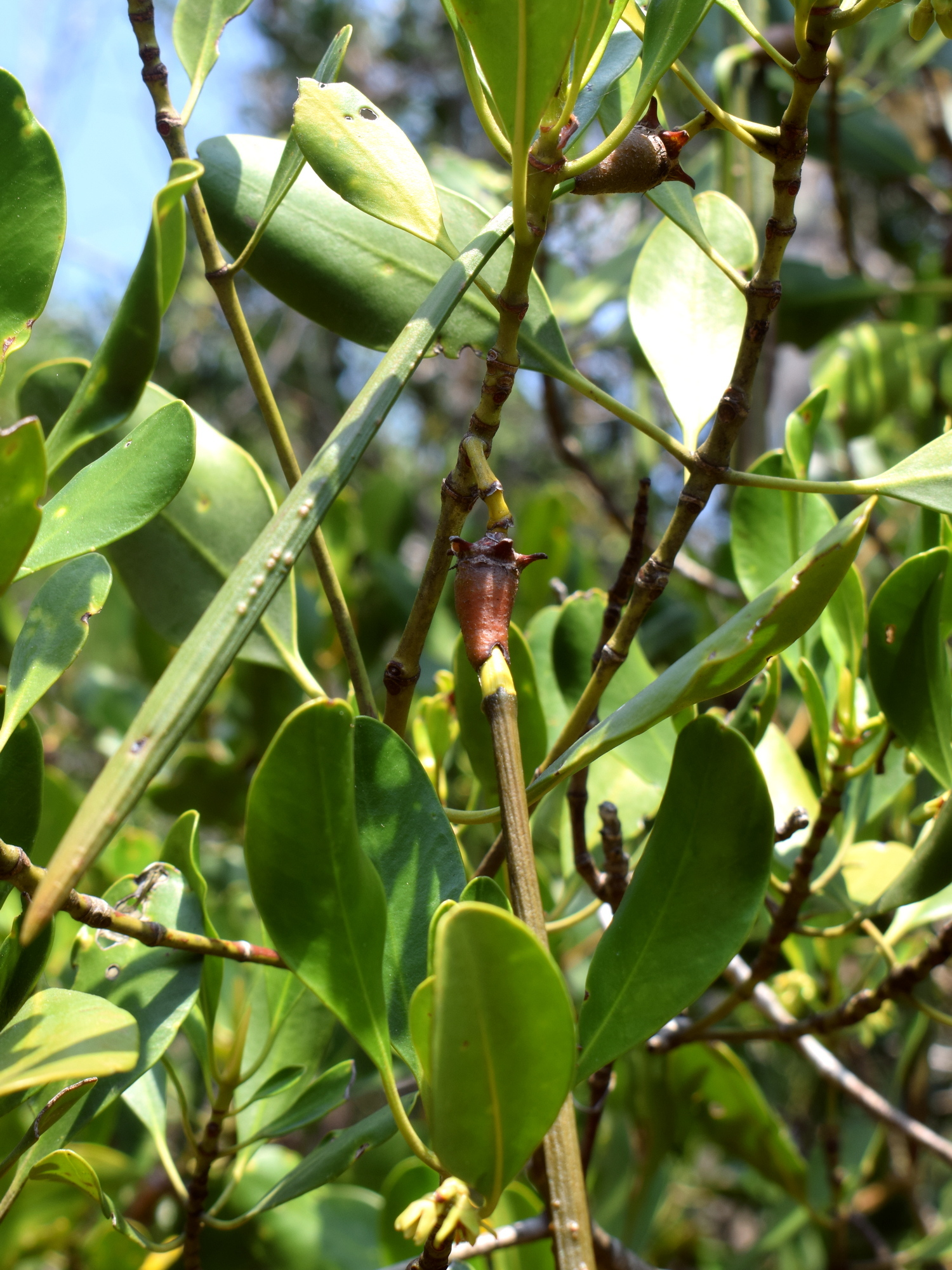
Ribbed hypocotyls on fruit

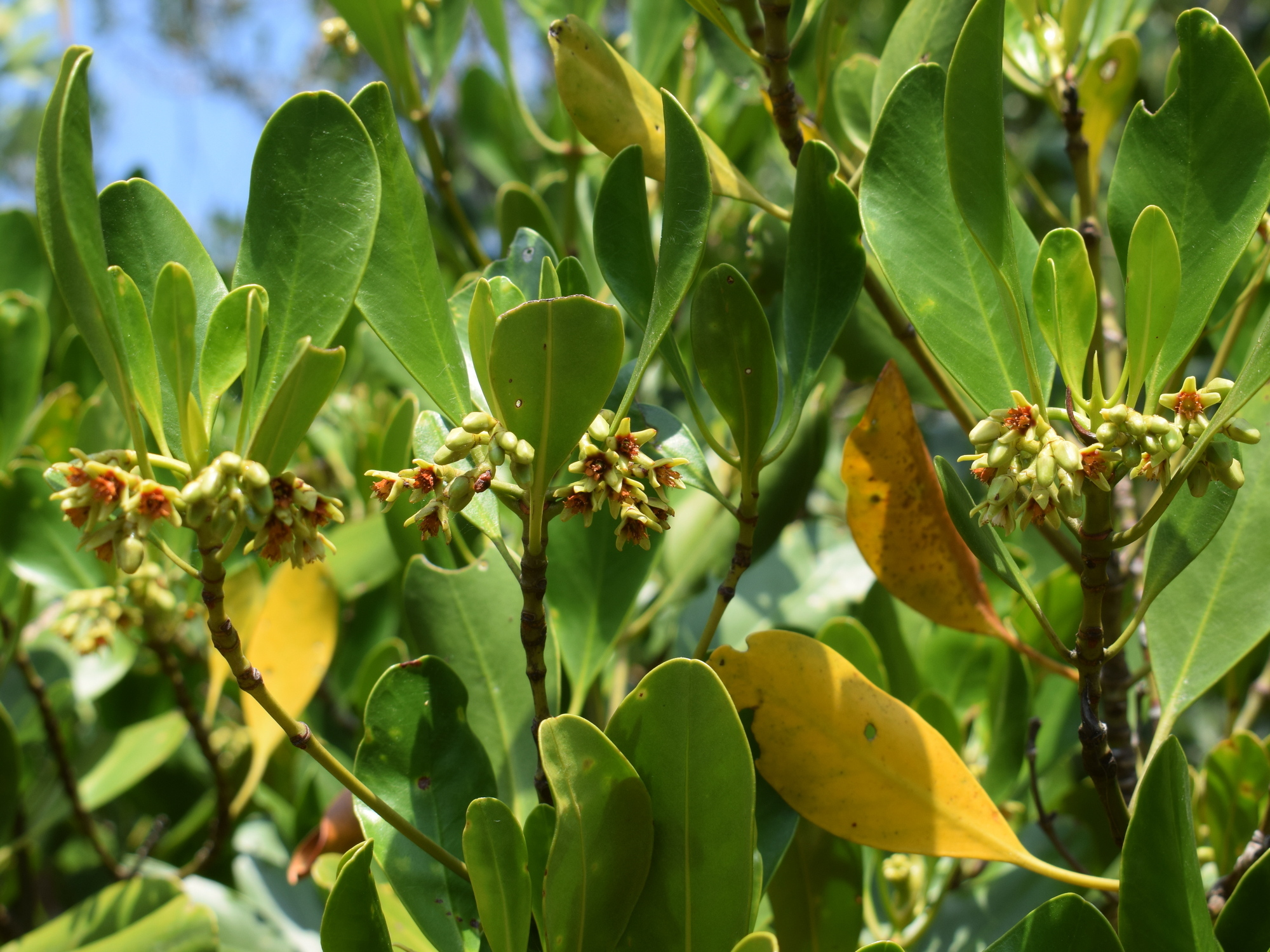
Flowers & upright leaves

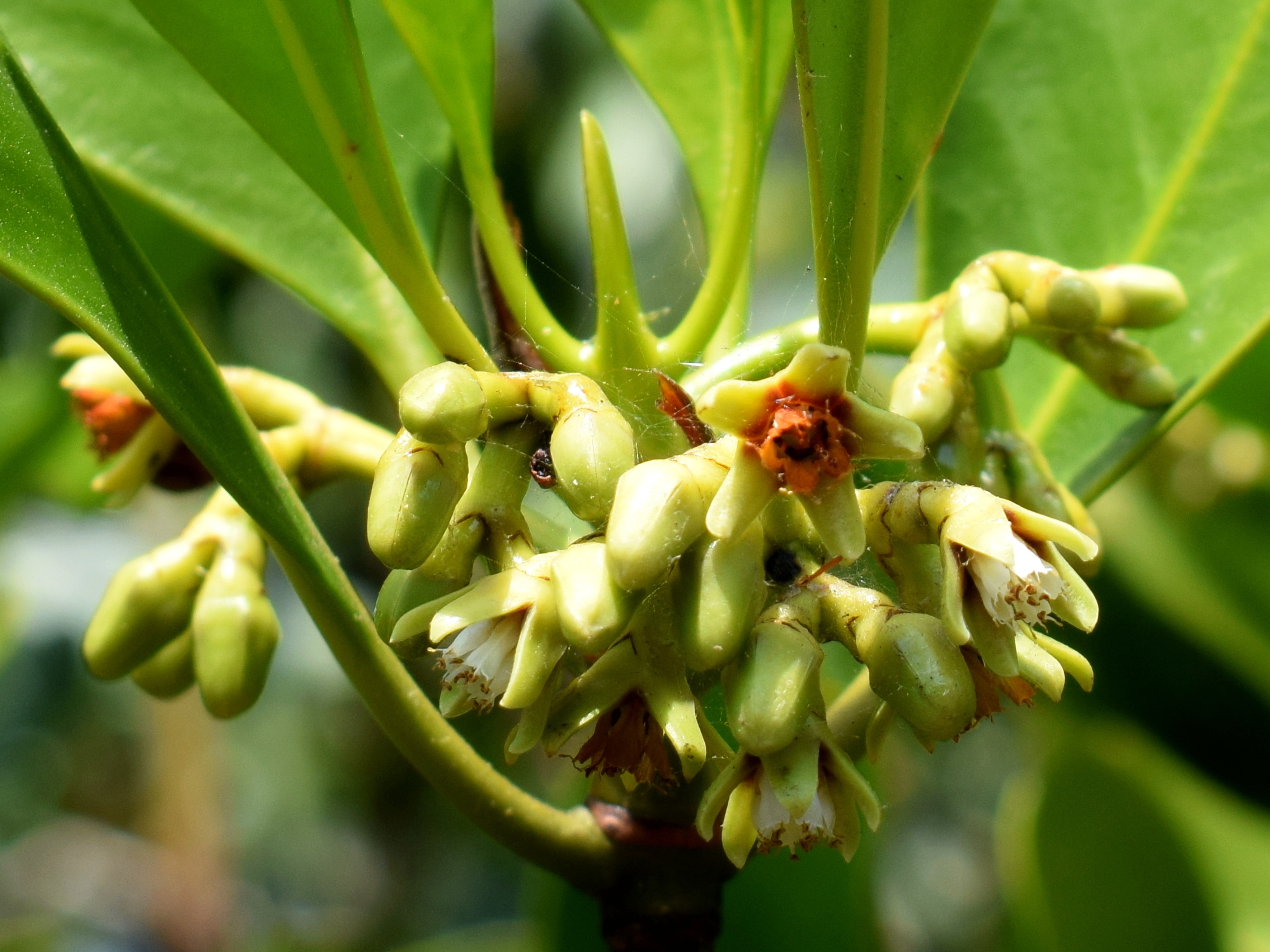
Flower detail

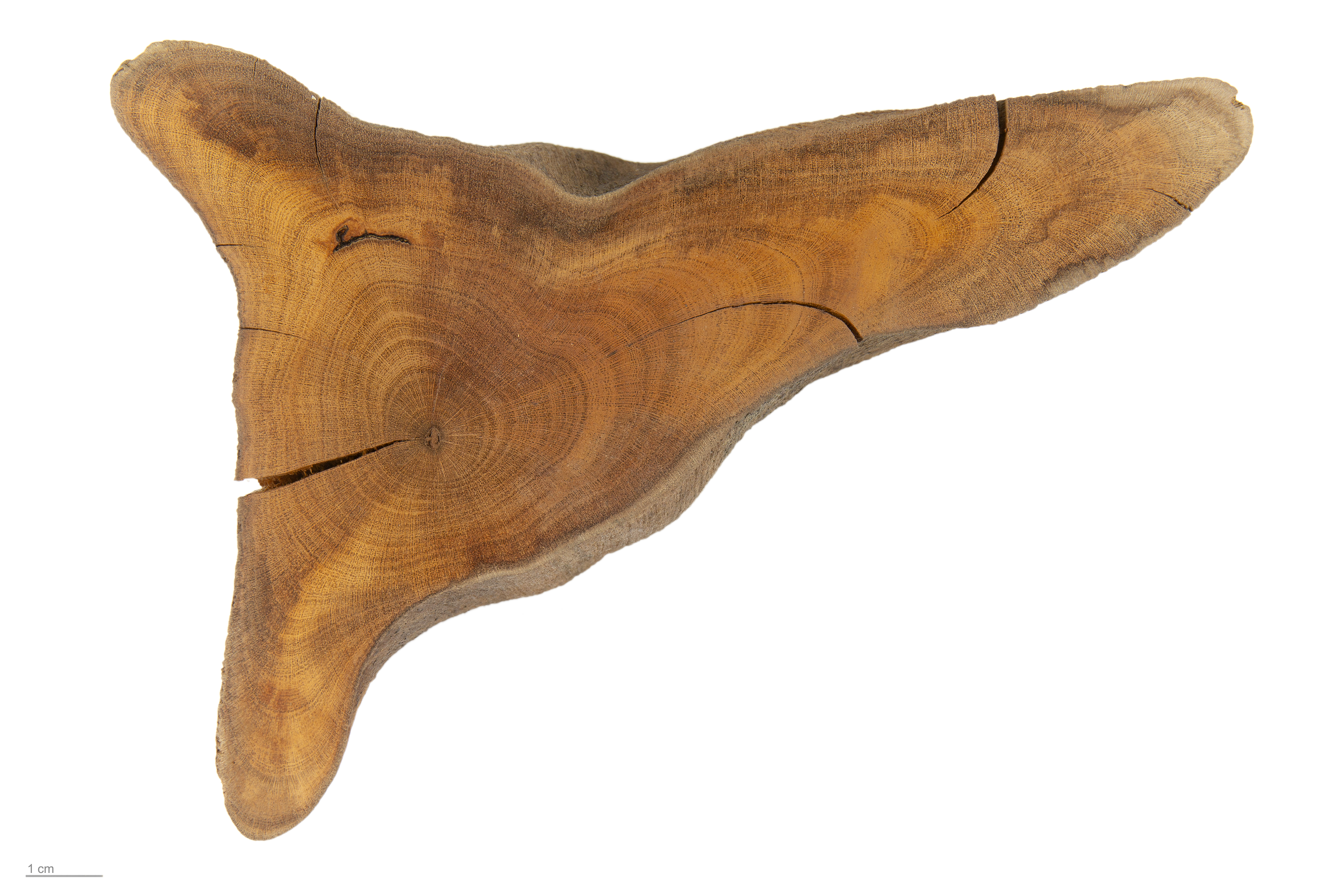
Wood - MHNT

== See also ==
- List of Southern African indigenous trees
