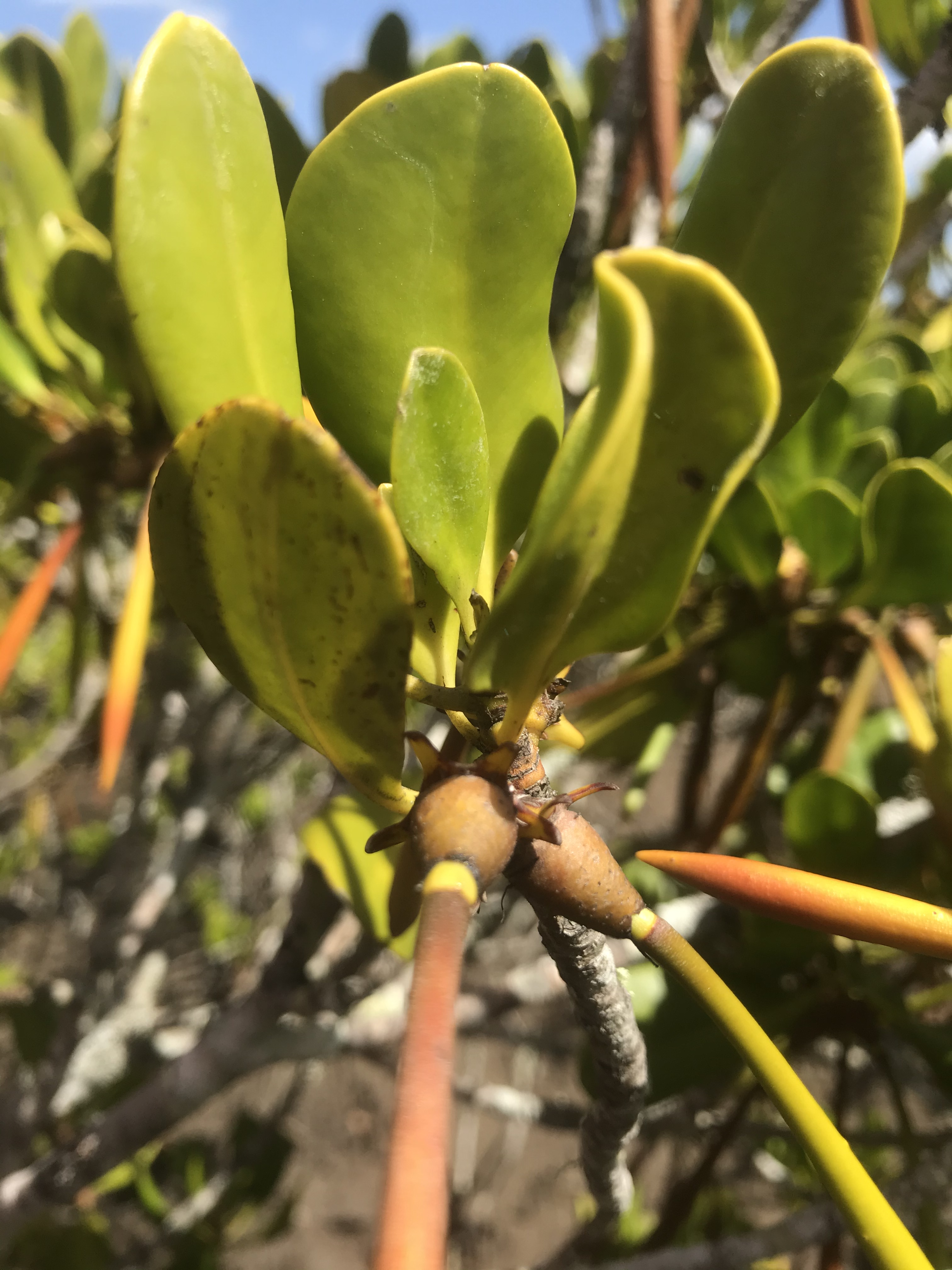

Conservation status
- Least Concern (IUCN 3.1)

Scientific classification
- Kingdom: Plantae
- Clade: Tracheophytes
- Clade: Angiosperms
- Clade: Eudicots
- Clade: Rosids
- Order: Malpighiales
- Family: Rhizophoraceae
- Genus: Ceriops
- Species: C. australis

Binomial name
- Ceriops australis (C.T.White) Ballment, T.J.Sm. & J.A.Stoddart

Synonyms
- Ceriops tagal var. australis

= Ceriops australis =

Species of flowering plant

Ceriops australis, the yellow mangrove or smooth-fruited yellow mangrove, is a species of mangrove in the family Rhizophoraceae, native to tropical northern Australia and southern New Guinea. It is a common species in the region and although mangroves are threatened by habitat destruction and climate change, the International Union for Conservation of Nature has assessed its conservation status as being of "least concern".

== Description ==
Ceriops australis is a small evergreen tree or shrub growing to a maximum height of about 10 m (30 ft). The growth habit is columnar or multi-stemmed and it develops large buttress roots. The bark is silvery-grey to orangeish-brown, smooth with occasional lenticels. The leaves are in opposite pairs, glossy yellowish-green above, obovate with entire margins, up to 6 cm (2.4 in) long and 3 cm (1.2 in) wide. The flowers are borne singly in the leaf axils; each has a short calyx tube and parts in fives or sixes. The fruit is pear-shaped, suspended from the shrunken calyx tube. Brown at first, it changes colour as it matures and the hypocotyl emerges. The hypocotyl is long, slender and smooth, reaching a length of up to 15 cm (6 in). This mangrove is viviparous, the propagule emerging from the end of the fruit, falling from the tree and developing into a new plant.

It is very similar in appearance to Ceriops tagal and grows alongside it; previously thought to be the same species, it has now been shown to be genetically distinct. The difference between the two can be observed when the tree is fruiting, C. tagal having ribbed hypocotyls while those of C. australis are smooth.

== Distribution and habitat ==
In tropical northern Australia, C. australis is the dominant mangrove in estuarine habitats, its range extending from Exmouth in Western Australia to the southern end of Moreton Bay in Queensland. Its status in New Guinea is less clear, because of the confusion in the past with C. tagal. It does not tolerate strong wave action, high winds or strong currents, but prefers drier sites, with high salinities on the landward side of the coastal mangrove strip and bordering salt pans.

== Uses ==
Indigenous Australians have traditionally used this tree to make sticks for digging and throwing, and for spear shafts. An infusion of the inner bark has been used to treat skin problems, and the outer bark as a dye and for tanning. The larvae of the moth Syntherata janetta feed on the foliage.

== Gallery ==
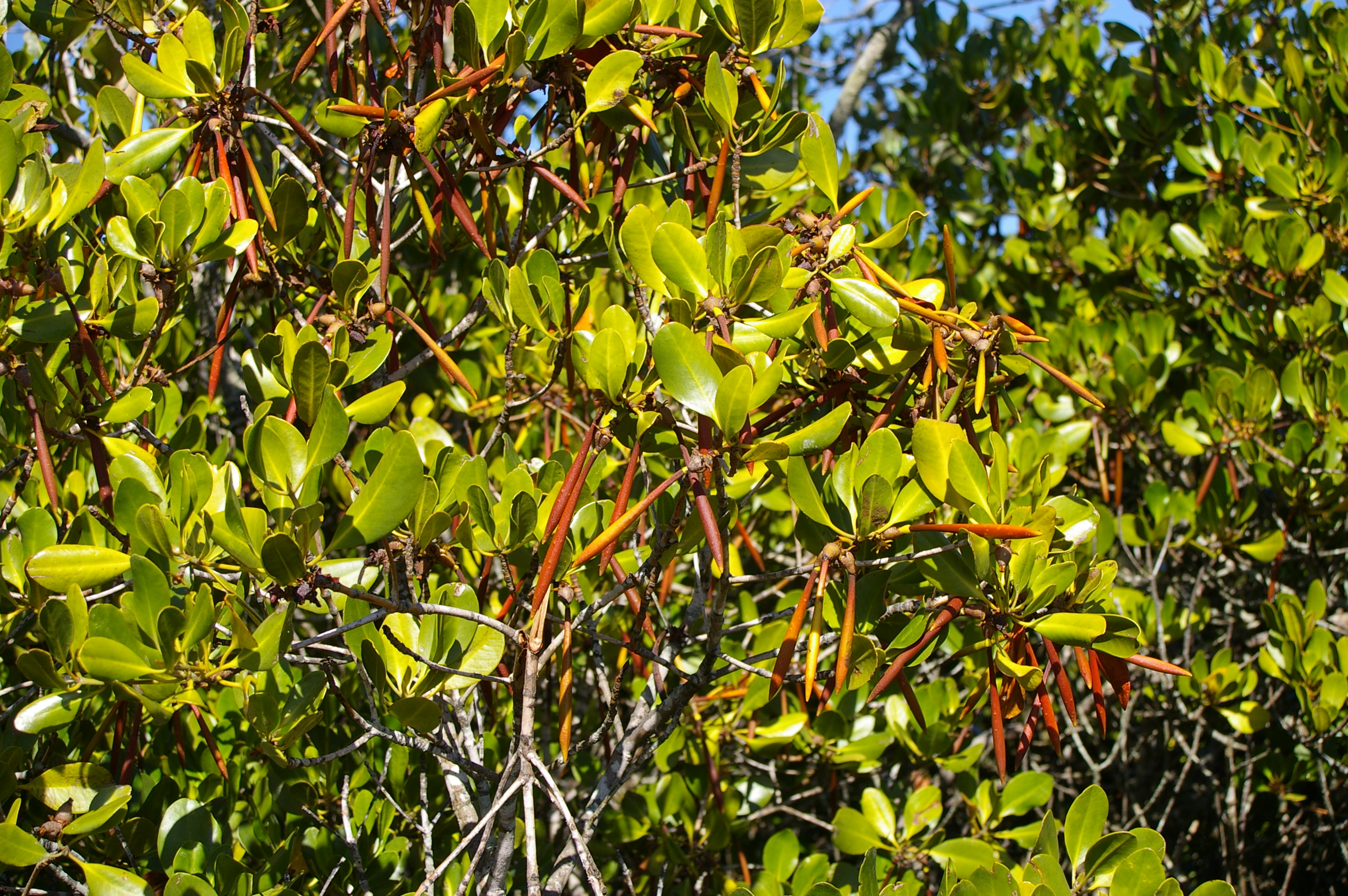
Viviparous seedlings

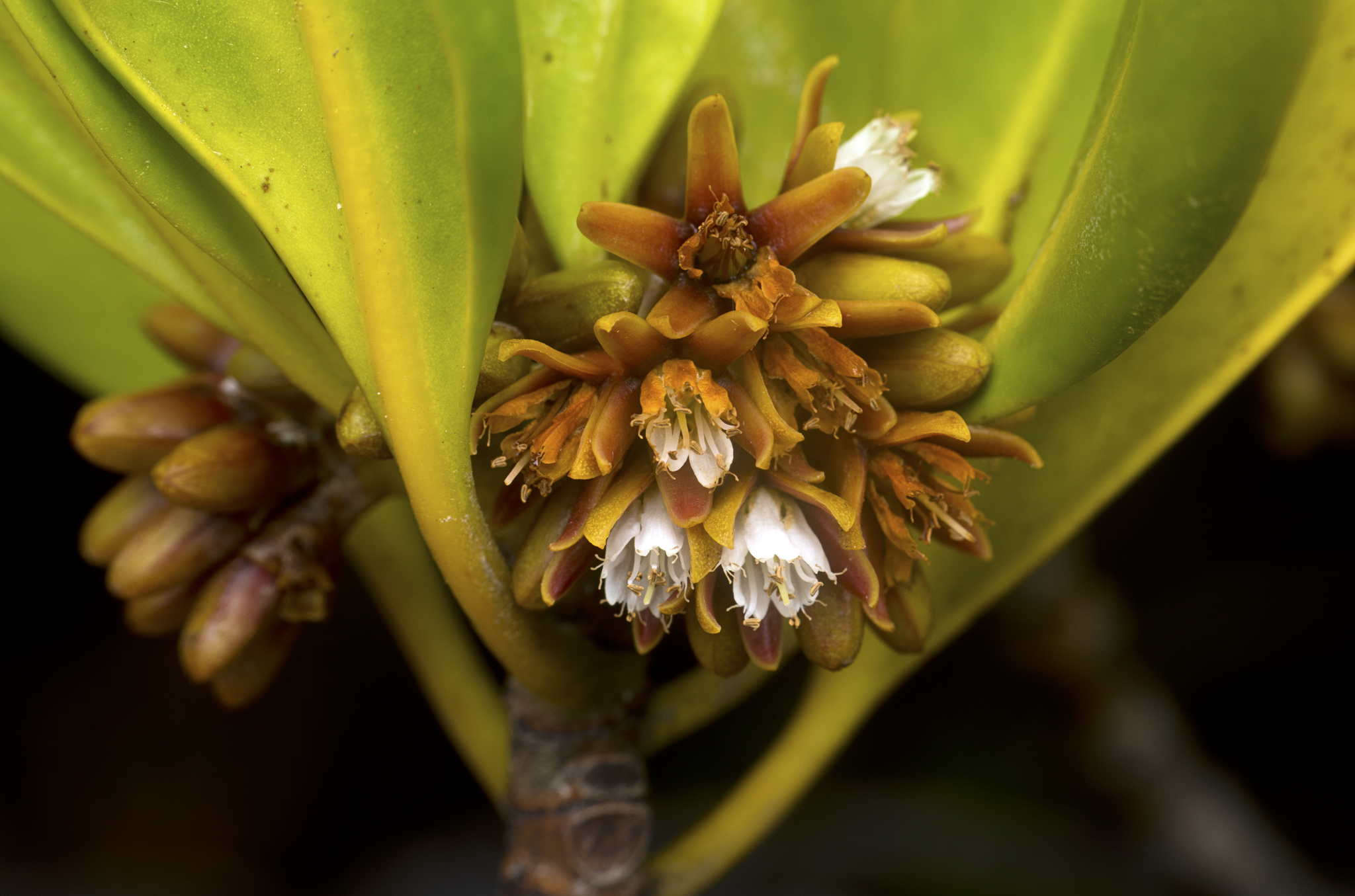
flowering

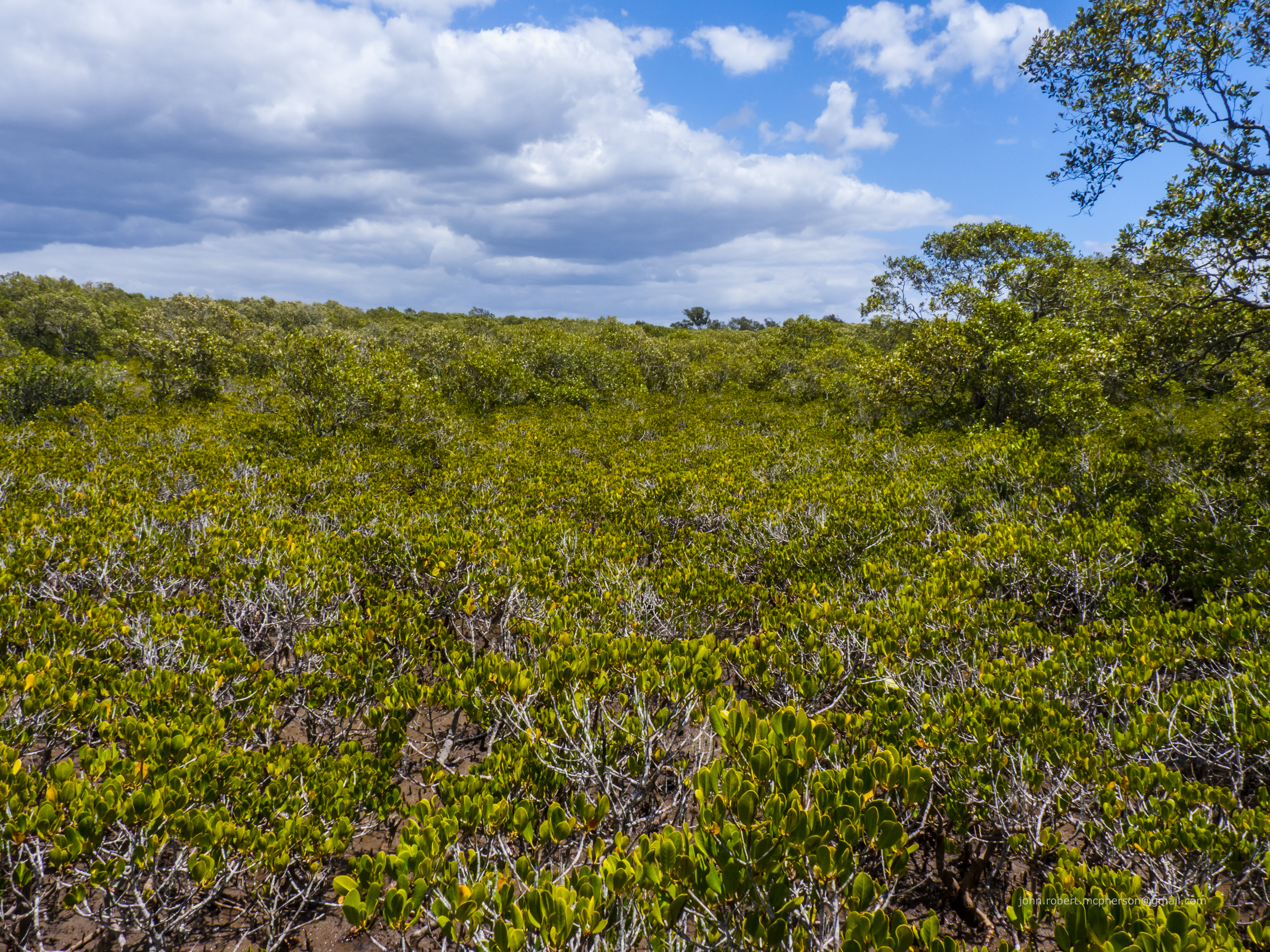
Extensive stand, Nudgee Creek, Queensland
