= Cassipourea hiotou =

Conservation status
- Vulnerable (IUCN 2.3)

Scientific classification
- Kingdom: Plantae
- Clade: Tracheophytes
- Clade: Angiosperms
- Clade: Eudicots
- Clade: Rosids
- Order: Malpighiales
- Family: Rhizophoraceae
- Genus: Cassipourea
- Species: C. hiotou

Binomial name
- Cassipourea hiotou Aubrév. & Pellegr.

Species of flowering plant

Cassipourea hiotou is a species of plant in the Rhizophoraceae family found in Ivory Coast and Ghana. The species grows naturally in the well-shaded, to wet evergreen forests on the land region lying between the Cavally and Sassandra rivers. Although the extent of these forests has been significantly reduced (due to the expansion of industrial plantations, mining interests and over-logging), it can be locally common.
