= Kandeliimicrobium =

Scientific classification
- Domain: Bacteria
- Kingdom: Pseudomonadati
- Phylum: Pseudomonadota
- Class: Alphaproteobacteria
- Order: Rhodobacterales
- Family: Rhodobacteraceae
- Genus: Kandeliimicrobium; Wang et al. 2018

Type species
- Kandeliimicrobium roseum

Species
- K. roseum

Genus of bacteria

Kandeliimicrobium is a Gram-negative genus of bacteria from the family of Rhodobacteraceae with one known species (Kandeliimicrobium roseum). Kandeliimicrobium roseum has been isolated from rhizospheric soil from the mangrove Kandelia candel from the Mai Po Nature Reserve in Hong Kong.
