= Cassipourea congoensis =

Conservation status
- Endangered (IUCN 3.1)

Scientific classification
- Kingdom: Plantae
- Clade: Tracheophytes
- Clade: Angiosperms
- Clade: Eudicots
- Clade: Rosids
- Order: Malpighiales
- Family: Rhizophoraceae
- Genus: Cassipourea
- Species: C. congoensis

Binomial name
- Cassipourea congoensis R.Br. ex DC.

Synonyms
- Anstrutheria africana (Benth.) Benth.; Cassipourea acuminata Liben; Cassipourea africana Benth.; Cassipourea louisii Liben; Richaeia africana (Benth.) Kuntze; Weihea africana (Benth.) Oliv.

Species of flowering plant

Cassipourea congoensis is a species of flowering plant in the Rhizophoraceae family. It is a tree native to the Guineo-Congolian region of west and west-central tropical Africa, ranging from Senegal to Tanzania and southwestern Uganda. Its natural habitats are subtropical or tropical moist lowland forests and subtropical or tropical swamps. It is threatened by habitat loss.
