= Pellacalyx yunnanensis =

Conservation status
- Endangered (IUCN 2.3)

Scientific classification
- Kingdom: Plantae
- Clade: Tracheophytes
- Clade: Angiosperms
- Clade: Eudicots
- Clade: Rosids
- Order: Malpighiales
- Family: Rhizophoraceae
- Genus: Pellacalyx
- Species: P. yunnanensis

Binomial name
- Pellacalyx yunnanensis Hu

Species of flowering plant

Pellacalyx yunnanensis is a species of plant in the Rhizophoraceae family. It is endemic to China.
