= Cassipourea dinklagei =

Conservation status
- Endangered (IUCN 3.1)

Scientific classification
- Kingdom: Plantae
- Clade: Tracheophytes
- Clade: Angiosperms
- Clade: Eudicots
- Clade: Rosids
- Order: Malpighiales
- Family: Rhizophoraceae
- Genus: Cassipourea
- Species: C. dinklagei

Binomial name
- Cassipourea dinklagei (Engl.) Alston

Synonyms
- Dactylopetalum dinklagei

Species of flowering plant

Casipourea dinklagei is a species of flowering plant in the Rhizophoraceae family. It is a tree native to Cameroon, and grows in the wet tropical biome.
