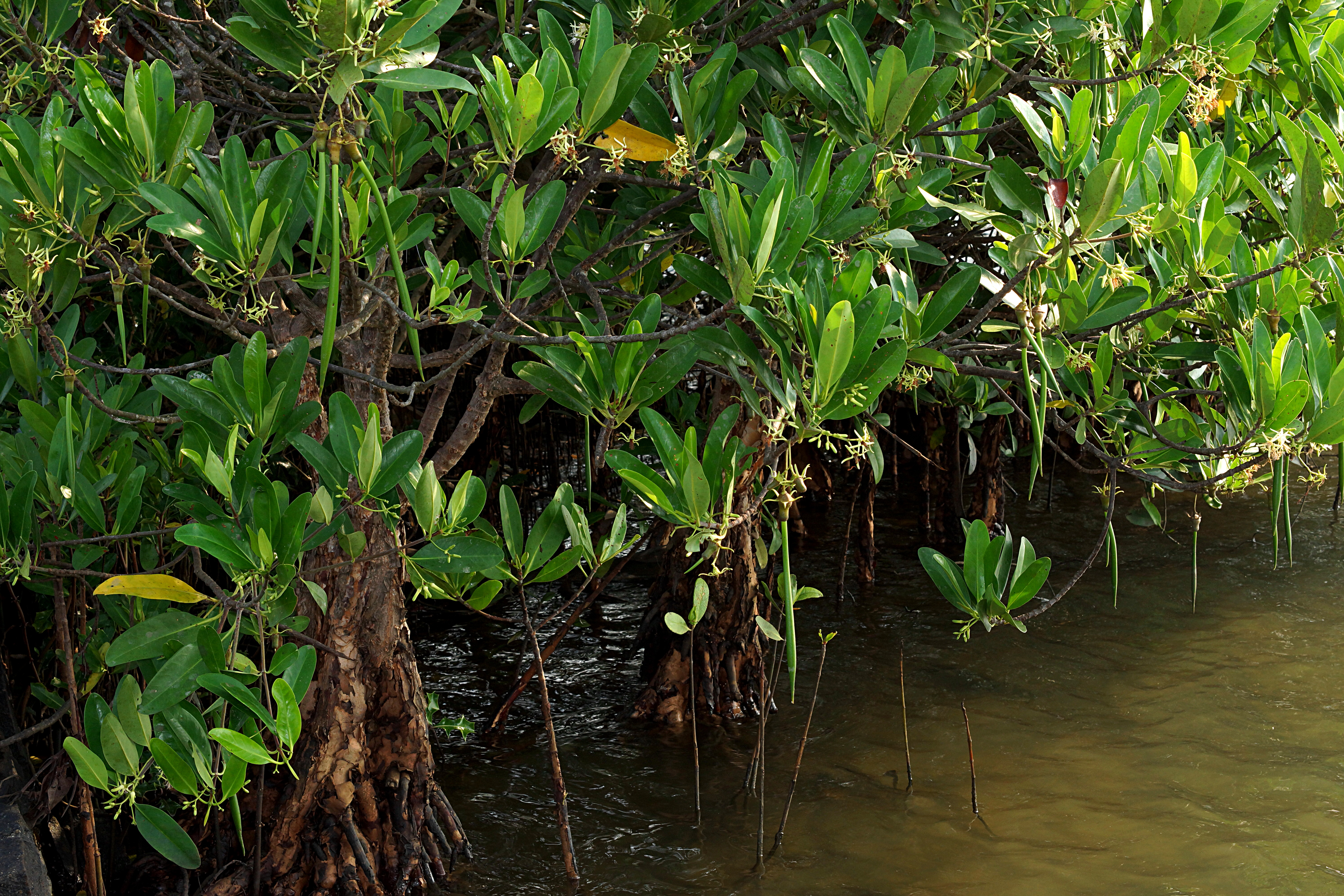

Conservation status
- Least Concern (IUCN 3.1)

Scientific classification
- Kingdom: Plantae
- Clade: Tracheophytes
- Clade: Angiosperms
- Clade: Eudicots
- Clade: Rosids
- Order: Malpighiales
- Family: Rhizophoraceae
- Genus: Kandelia
- Species: K. candel

Binomial name
- Kandelia candel (L.) Druce
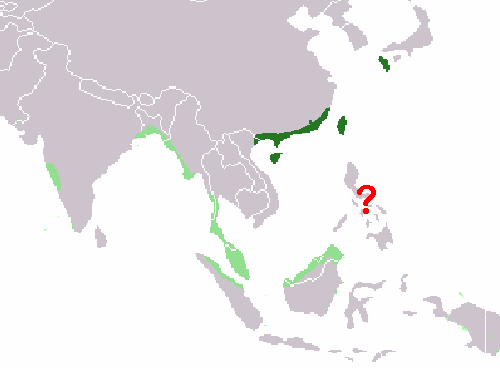
- K. candel range (light green)

Synonyms
- Bruguiera candel Steud.; Kandelia rheedii Wight & Arn.; Rhizophora candel L.

= Kandelia candel =

Species of flowering plant

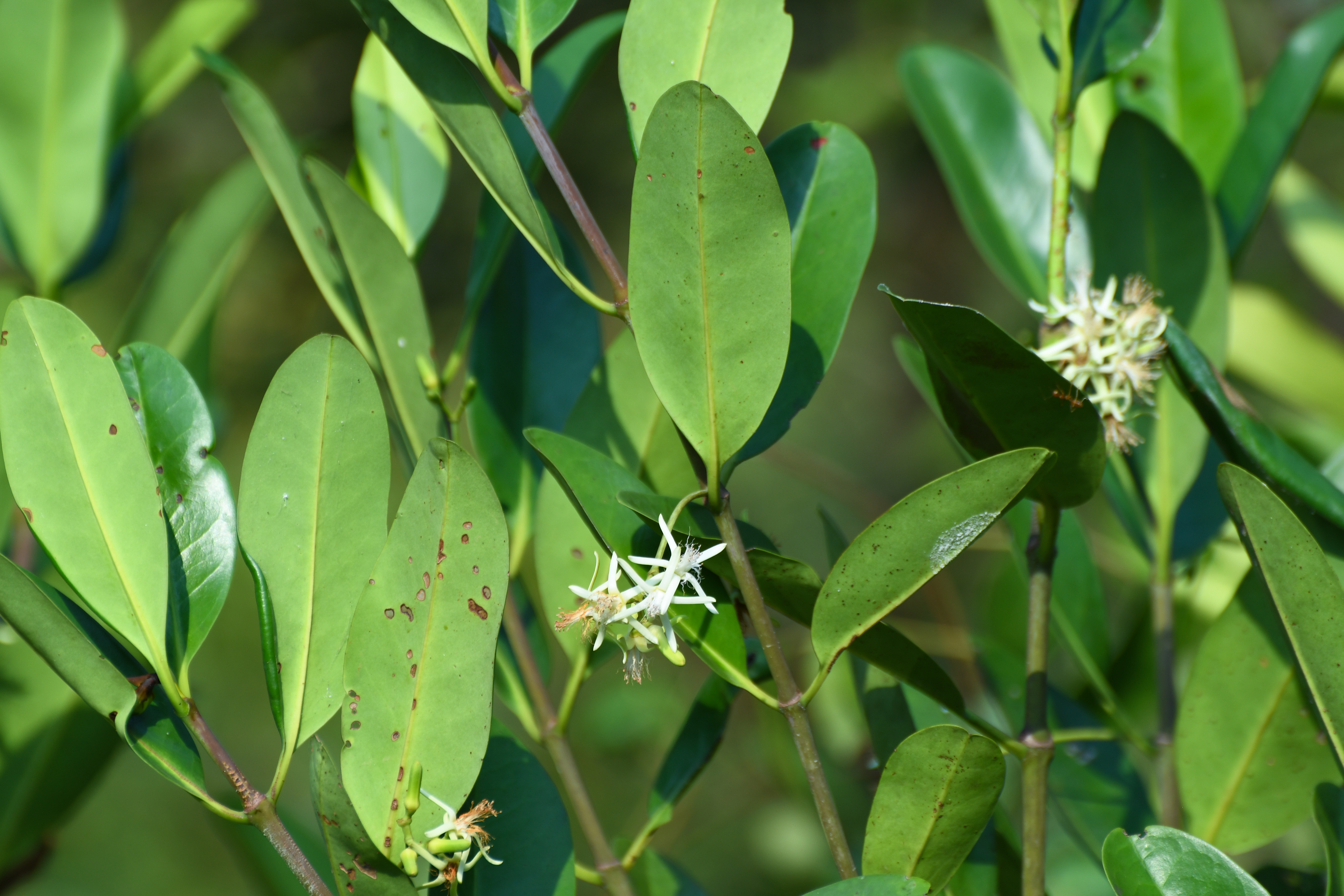
Flowers

Kandelia candel is a species of mangrove in the family Rhizophoraceae, found around the coasts of South Asia and Southeast Asia, from western India to Borneo. Populations further east, from Vietnam to Japan were formerly included in K. candel, but are now considered a separate species, K. obovata.

== Description ==
Kandelia candel grows as a shrub or small tree up to 10 metres (30 ft) tall. Its flaky bark is lenticellate and coloured greyish to reddish brown. The flowers are white. The ovoid fruits measure up to 25 cm (10 in) long.
