= Pellacalyx lobbii =

Conservation status
- Least Concern (IUCN 3.1)

Scientific classification
- Kingdom: Plantae
- Clade: Tracheophytes
- Clade: Angiosperms
- Clade: Eudicots
- Clade: Rosids
- Order: Malpighiales
- Family: Rhizophoraceae
- Genus: Pellacalyx
- Species: P. lobbii

Binomial name
- Pellacalyx lobbii (Hook.f.) A.Schimp.

Synonyms
- Plaesiantha lobbii Hook.f.

Species of tree

Pellacalyx lobbii is a tree in the family Rhizophoraceae. It is named for the British botanist Thomas Lobb.

== Description ==
Pellacalyx lobbii grows up to 45 m (150 ft) tall, with a trunk diameter of 65 cm (30 in). There may be stilt roots. The leaves are oblong to obovate and measure up to 17 cm (7 in) long. The wood is locally used as fuel and to make rafters.

== Distribution and habitat ==
Pellacalyx lobbii is native to Borneo, Sumatra and the Philippines. Its habitat is in forests and clearings, often in hilly areas, at elevations to 300 m (1,000 ft).
