= Cassipourea lanceolata =

Conservation status
- Near Threatened (IUCN 3.1)

Scientific classification
- Kingdom: Plantae
- Clade: Tracheophytes
- Clade: Angiosperms
- Clade: Eudicots
- Clade: Rosids
- Order: Malpighiales
- Family: Rhizophoraceae
- Genus: Cassipourea
- Species: C. lanceolata

Binomial name
- Cassipourea lanceolata Tul.

Synonyms
- Cassipourea thomassetii (Hemsl.) Alston; Richaeia lanceolata (Tul.) Baill.; Weihea lanceolata (Tul.) Baill.; Weihea lanceolata var. boinensis H.Perrier ex Arènes; Weihea lanceolata var. ovatifolia Arènes; Weihea thomassetii Hemsl.

Species of flowering plant

Cassipourea lanceolata is a species of flowering plant in the Rhizophoraceae family. It is a shrub or tree native to Aldabra, the Comoros, and northwestern Madagascar. It grows in humid, subhumid, and dry forests on sandy, ferralitic, and limestone (including tsingy) substrates up to 1000 meters elevation.
