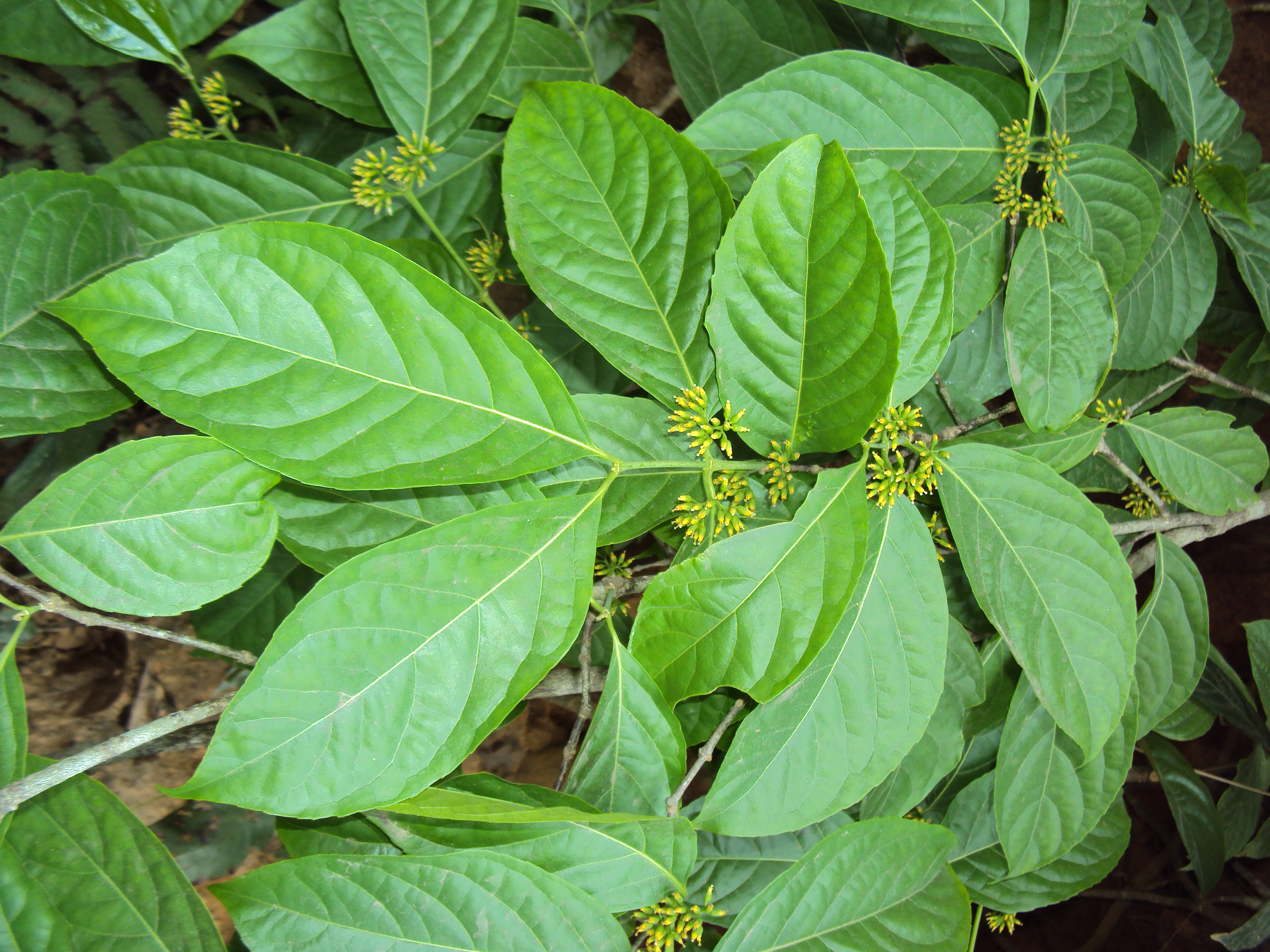

Scientific classification
- Kingdom: Plantae
- Clade: Tracheophytes
- Clade: Angiosperms
- Clade: Eudicots
- Clade: Rosids
- Order: Malpighiales
- Family: Rhizophoraceae
- Genus: Blepharistemma; Wall. ex Benth.
- Species: B. membranifolium

Binomial name
- Blepharistemma membranifolium (Miq.) Ding Hou

Synonyms
- Rodschiedia Dennst.; Blepharistemma serratum Suresh; Blepharistemma corymbosum Wall. ex Benth.; Dryptopetalum membranaceum Miq. ex Benth.; Gynotroches membranifolia Miq.; Rodschiedia serrata Dennst.

= Blepharistemma =

Genus of flowering plants

Blepharistemma membranifolium is a species of plant in the family Rhizophoraceae, and the only species of the genus Blepharistemma. The tree typically grows in a wet tropical biome and is native to southwest India.
