= Gynotroches =

Scientific classification
- Kingdom: Plantae
- Clade: Tracheophytes
- Clade: Angiosperms
- Clade: Eudicots
- Clade: Rosids
- Order: Malpighiales
- Family: Rhizophoraceae
- Genus: Gynotroches; Blume
- Species: G. axillaris

Binomial name
- Gynotroches axillaris Blume

Synonyms
- Dryptopetalum Arn.; Gynaecotrochus Hassk.; Dryptopetalum coriaceum Arn.; Gynotroches dryptopetalum Blume; Gynotroches lanceolata Merr.; Gynotroches micrantha Blume; Gynotroches parvifolia Merr.; Gynotroches puberula Merr.; Gynotroches reticulata A.Gray

Genus of trees

Gynotroches is a monotypic genus of trees in the family Rhizophoraceae. It contains the single species Gynotroches axillaris. The generic name Gynotroches is from the Greek meaning "woman wheel", referring to the shape of the stigma. The specific epithet axillaris is from the Latin, referring to the axillary position of the flowers.

== Description ==
Gynotroches axillaris grows as a tree up to 35 metres (110 ft) tall with a trunk diameter of up to 70 cm (28 in). Its smooth bark is grey to blackish. The flowers are greenish white. The roundish fruits are green, turning red to black, and measure up to 0.3 cm (0.1 in) in diameter.

== Distribution and habitat ==
Gynotroches axillaris grows naturally in the Nicobar Islands, Myanmar, Thailand, throughout Malesia, New Guinea, and in Pohnpei in the Federated States of Micronesia. Its habitat is by rivers and in sandy areas from sea-level to 2,200 m (7,200 ft) elevation.
