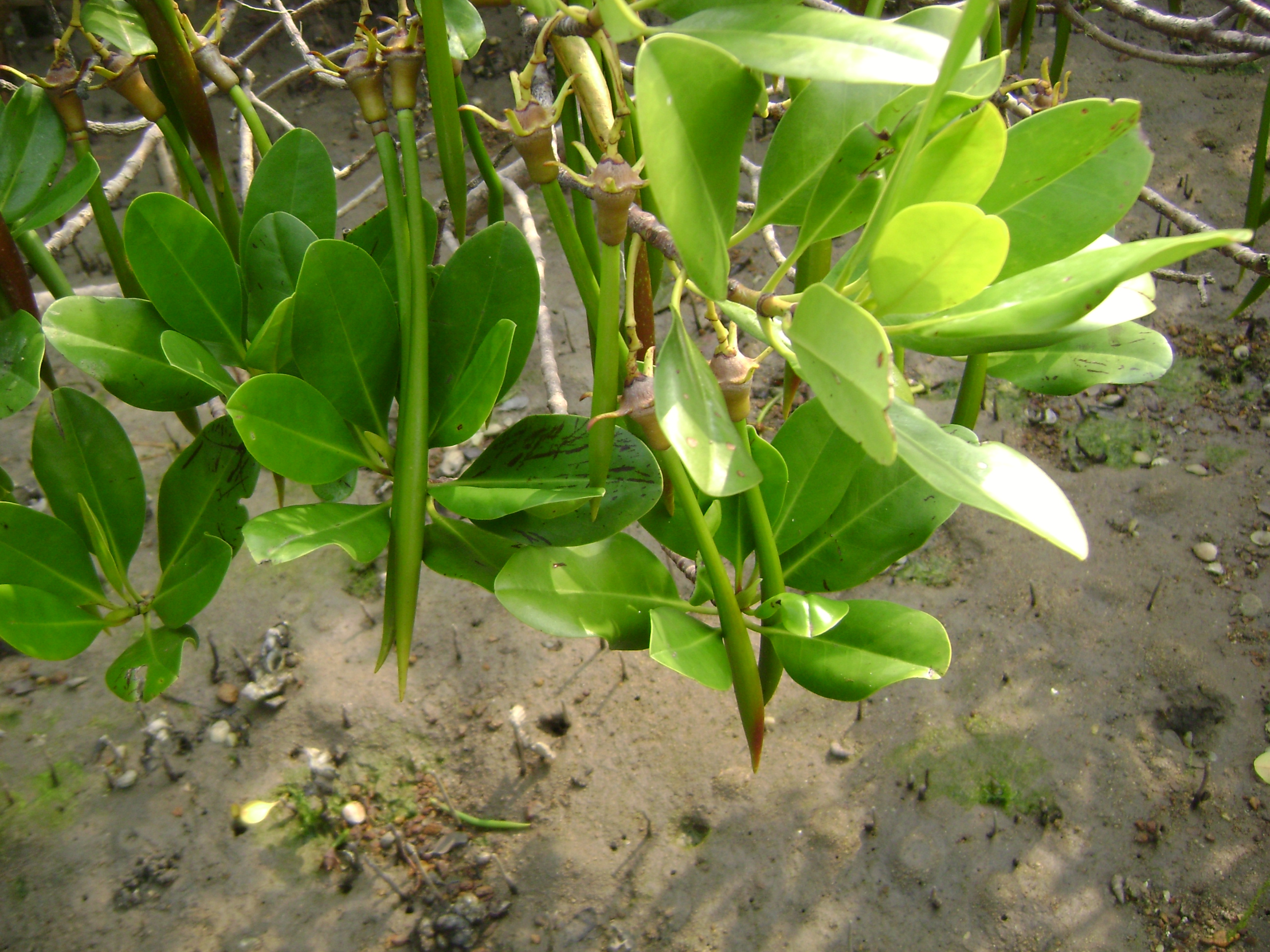

Conservation status
- Least Concern (IUCN 3.1)

Scientific classification
- Kingdom: Plantae
- Clade: Tracheophytes
- Clade: Angiosperms
- Clade: Eudicots
- Clade: Rosids
- Order: Malpighiales
- Family: Rhizophoraceae
- Genus: Kandelia
- Species: K. obovata

Binomial name
- Kandelia obovata Sheue, Liu & Yong

= Kandelia obovata =

Species of flowering plant

Kandelia obovata (Traditional Chinese: 水筆仔、秋茄樹) is a species of plant in the Rhizophoraceae family, i.e. a kind of mangrove. It is found in Vietnam, Natuna Islands of Indonesia, Southern China, Hong Kong, Taiwan, and Japan. Its presence in the Philippines is possible but not confirmed.

The florescence period of this species is between May and July. The flowers of it are white and like a star. In Autumn, they usually fructify with cone-like fruits, and their seeds germinate while still attached to the parent tree. Once germinated, the seedling grows and forms a propagule (a seedling ready to go), which can produce its own food via photosynthesis. After 3 to 6 months, when the propagule is mature, it drops into the water where it can then be transported great distances. Propagules can survive desiccation and remain dormant for weeks, months, or even over a year until they arrive in a suitable environment. Once a propagule is ready to root, it will change its density so that the elongated shape now floats vertically rather than horizontally. In this position, it is more likely to become lodged in the mud and root. If it does not root, it can alter its density so that it floats off again in search of more favorable conditions.

As a kind of mangrove, K. obovata grows in saline (brackish) coastal habitats, and is mass planted in order to check winds, control sand and protect dikes.

== Distribution ==
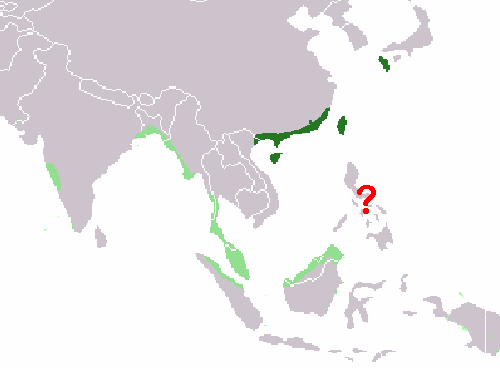
K. obovata range (dark green)

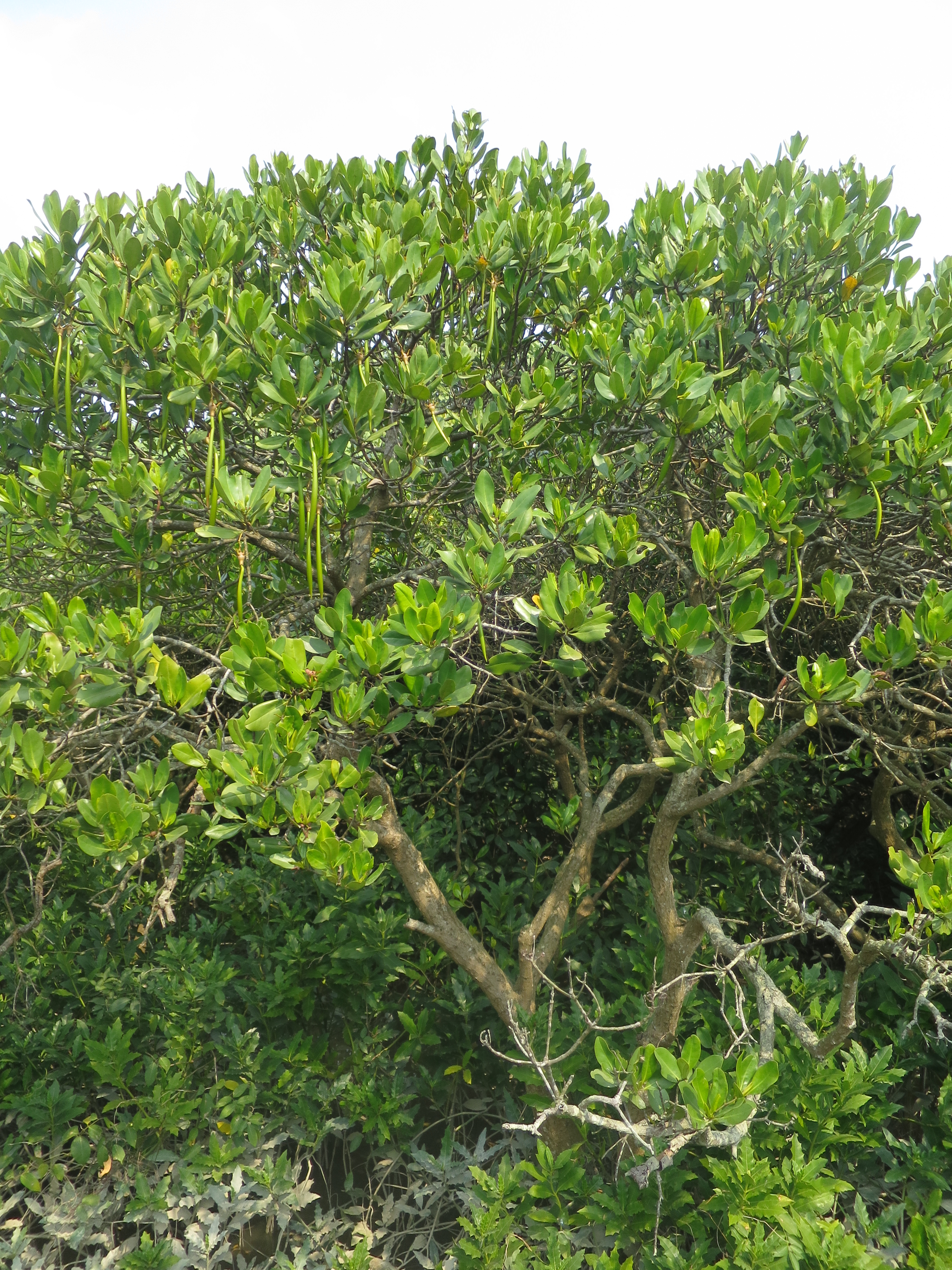
It is the most widespread mangrove species in Hong Kong
