= Comiphyton =

Scientific classification
- Kingdom: Plantae
- Clade: Tracheophytes
- Clade: Angiosperms
- Clade: Eudicots
- Clade: Rosids
- Order: Malpighiales
- Family: Rhizophoraceae
- Genus: Comiphyton; Floret
- Species: C. gabonense

Binomial name
- Comiphyton gabonense Floret

Genus of flowering plants

Comiphyton is a genus of flowering plants belonging to the family Rhizophoraceae. It includes a single species, Comiphyton gabonense, a tree native to Gabon and the Democratic Republic of the Congo in west-central tropical Africa.
