= Macarisia =

Scientific classification
- Kingdom: Plantae
- Clade: Tracheophytes
- Clade: Angiosperms
- Clade: Eudicots
- Clade: Rosids
- Order: Malpighiales
- Family: Rhizophoraceae
- Genus: Macarisia; Thouars

Genus of plants

Macarisia is a genus of flowering plants belonging to the family Rhizophoraceae.

Its native range is Madagascar.

Species:

- Macarisia capuronii Arènes
- Macarisia ellipticifolia Arènes
- Macarisia emarginata Scott Elliot
- Macarisia humbertiana Arènes
- Macarisia lanceolata Baill.
- Macarisia nossibeensis (Arènes) Arènes
- Macarisia pyramidata Thouars
