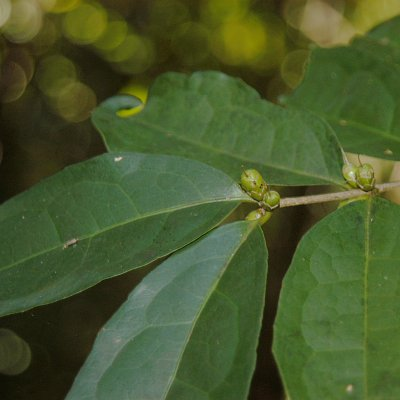
- Cassipourea sp.

Scientific classification
- Kingdom: Plantae
- Clade: Tracheophytes
- Clade: Angiosperms
- Clade: Eudicots
- Clade: Rosids
- Order: Malpighiales
- Family: Rhizophoraceae
- Genus: Cassipourea; Aubl.

Synonyms
- Anstrutheria Gardner; Dactylopetalum Benth.; Endosteira Turcz.; Legnotis Sw.; Petalodactylis Arènes; Richaeia Thouars; Tita Scop.; Weihea Spreng.

= Cassipourea =

Genus of flowering plants

Cassipourea is a genus of flowering plants in the family Rhizophoraceae. The genus is divided into several subgenera, based mainly on the structure of the flowers. It includes about 72 species native to the tropical Americas, tropical and Southern Africa, and the Indian Subcontinent.

== Species ==
72 species are accepted.

- Cassipourea adamauensis Jacq.-Fél. ex Pellegr.
- Cassipourea adami Jacq.-Fél.
- Cassipourea afzelii (Oliv.) Alston
- Cassipourea alternifolia Breteler
- Cassipourea annobonensis Mildbr. ex Alston
- Cassipourea atanganae Kenfack
- Cassipourea barteri (Hook.f. ex Oliv.) N.E.Br.
- Cassipourea calimensis Cuatrec.
- Cassipourea carringtoniana Mendes
- Cassipourea celastroides Alston
- Cassipourea ceylanica (Gardner) Alston
- Cassipourea congoensis R.Br. ex DC.
- Cassipourea delphinensis Capuron
- Cassipourea dinklagei (Engl.) Alston
- Cassipourea eketensis Baker f.
- Cassipourea elliptica (Sw.) Poir. (synonym C. brittoniana Fawc. & Rendle)
- Cassipourea ellipticifolia (Arènes) Capuron
- Cassipourea euryoides Alston
- Cassipourea evrardii Floret
- Cassipourea fanshawei Torre & Goncalves
- Cassipourea firestoneana Hutch. & Dalziel ex G.P.Cooper & Record
- Cassipourea flanaganii (Schinz) Alston
- Cassipourea floribunda Cuatrec.
- Cassipourea glomerata Alston
- Cassipourea gossweileri Exell
- Cassipourea guianensis Aubl.
- Cassipourea gummiflua Tul.
- Cassipourea hiotou Aubrév. & Pellegr.
- Cassipourea killipii Cuatrec.
- Cassipourea korupensis Kenfack & Sainge
- Cassipourea lanceolata Tul. (synonym C. thomassetii (Hemsl.) Alston)
- Cassipourea lasiocalyx Alston
- Cassipourea leptoclada Tul.
- Cassipourea leptoneura Floret
- Cassipourea lescotiana J.-G.Adam
- Cassipourea letestui Pellegr.
- Cassipourea madagascariensis (Thouars) DC.
- Cassipourea malosana (Baker) Alston
- Cassipourea microphylla Tul.
- Cassipourea mollis (R.E.Fr.) Alston
- Cassipourea mossambicensis (Brehmer) Alston
- Cassipourea myriocarpa Tul.
- Cassipourea nana Breteler
- Cassipourea ndambiana Breteler
- Cassipourea ndando J.Léonard ex Floret
- Cassipourea nialatou Aubrév. & Pellegr.
- Cassipourea nodosa Alston
- Cassipourea obovata Alston
- Cassipourea obtusa Urb.
- Cassipourea ovata Tul.
- Cassipourea paludosa Hutch. & Dalziel ex Jacq.-Fél.
- Cassipourea peruviana Alston
- Cassipourea phoeotricha Tul.
- Cassipourea plumosa (Oliv.) Alston
- Cassipourea pumila Floret
- Cassipourea remacamensis Cornejo & Prance
- Cassipourea rogersii (S.Moore) Alston
- Cassipourea rotundifolia (Engl.) Alston
- Cassipourea ruwensorensis (Engl.) Alston
- Cassipourea salvago-raggei Alston
- Cassipourea schizocalyx C.H.Wright
- Cassipourea sessiliflora (Baker) Alston
- Cassipourea spruceana Benth.
- Cassipourea subcordata Britton
- Cassipourea subsessilis Britton
- Cassipourea swaziensis Compton
- Cassipourea toroensis Prance
- Cassipourea trichosticha Alston
- Cassipourea undulata Prance
- Cassipourea vilhenae Cavaco
- Cassipourea zenkeri (Engl.) Alston
