= Procalyptis =

Scientific classification
- Kingdom: Animalia
- Phylum: Arthropoda
- Class: Insecta
- Order: Lepidoptera
- Family: Tortricidae
- Tribe: Archipini
- Genus: Procalyptis; Meyrick, 1910

Genus of tortrix moths

Procalyptis is a genus of moths belonging to the subfamily Tortricinae of the family Tortricidae. These are small brown moths with fringed wings.

== Species ==
- Procalyptis albanyensis Strand, 1924
- Procalyptis oncota Meyrick, 1910
- Procalyptis parooptera (Turner, 1925)

== See also ==
- List of Tortricidae genera
