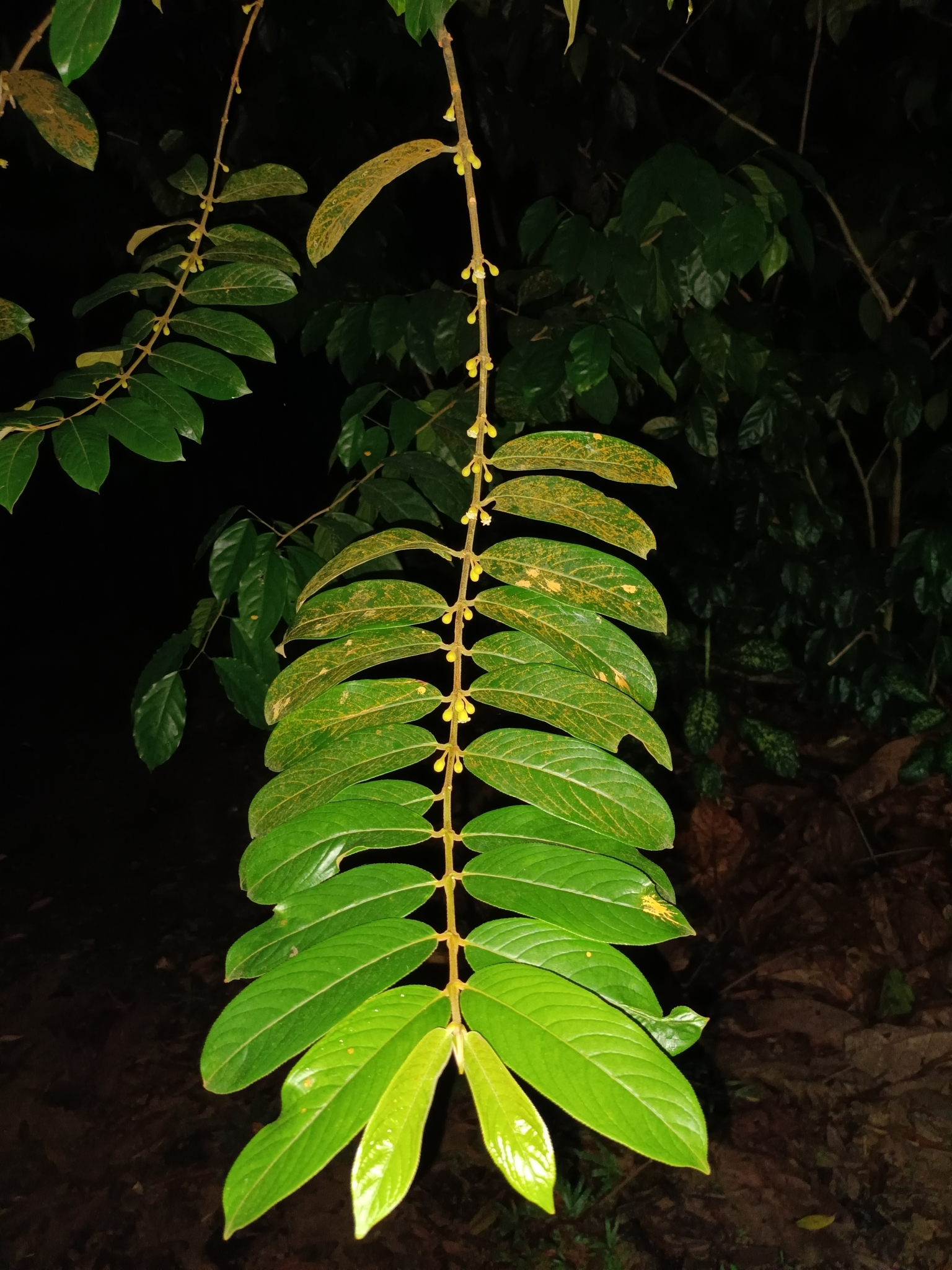
- Pellacalyx axillaris

Scientific classification
- Kingdom: Plantae
- Clade: Tracheophytes
- Clade: Angiosperms
- Clade: Eudicots
- Clade: Rosids
- Order: Malpighiales
- Family: Rhizophoraceae
- Genus: Pellacalyx; Korth.

Synonyms
- Craterianthus Valeton ex K.Heyne; Plaesiantha Hook.f.

= Pellacalyx =

Genus of trees

Pellacalyx is a genus of trees in the family Rhizophoraceae, distributed in Southeast Asia and surrounding regions.

As of December 2023, Plants of the World Online accepts the following species:

- Pellacalyx axillaris Korth.
- Pellacalyx cristatus Hemsl.
- Pellacalyx lobbii (Hook.f.) A.Schimp.
- Pellacalyx parkinsonii C.E.C.Fisch.
- Pellacalyx pustulata Merr.
- Pellacalyx saccardianus Scort.
- Pellacalyx symphiodiscus Stapf
- Pellacalyx yunnanensis Hu
