= Anopyxis =

Conservation status
- Vulnerable (IUCN 2.3)

Scientific classification
- Kingdom: Plantae
- Clade: Tracheophytes
- Clade: Angiosperms
- Clade: Eudicots
- Clade: Rosids
- Order: Malpighiales
- Family: Rhizophoraceae
- Genus: Anopyxis (Pierre) Engl.
- Species: A. klaineana

Binomial name
- Anopyxis klaineana (Pierre) Engl.

Synonyms
- Pynaertia De Wild.; Anopyxis ealaensis (De Wild.) Sprague; Anopyxis occidentalis (A.Chev.) A.Chev.; Macarisia klaineana Pierre (1898) (basionym); Pynaertia ealaensis De Wild.; Pynaertia occidentalis A.Chev.

Species of flowering plant

Anopyxis is a genus of flowering plants in the Rhizophoraceae family. It contains a single species, Anopyxis klaineana, a tree native to West Africa (Guinea, Sierra Leone, Liberia Côte d'Ivoire, Ghana, and Nigeria) and west-central Africa (Cameroon, Gabon, Republic of the Congo, Democratic Republic of the Congo, and Central African Republic). It grows in lowland evergreen rain forest.

The species was first described as Macarisia klaineana by Jean Baptiste Louis Pierre in 1898. In 1900 Adolf Engler placed the species in genus Anopyxis as A. klaineana.
