= Procalyptis oncota =

Scientific classification
- Kingdom: Animalia
- Phylum: Arthropoda
- Class: Insecta
- Order: Lepidoptera
- Family: Tortricidae
- Genus: Procalyptis
- Species: P. oncota

Binomial name
- Procalyptis oncota Meyrick, 1910

Species of moth

Procalyptis oncota is a species of moth of the family Tortricidae. It is found in Australia, where it has been recorded from Western Australia.
