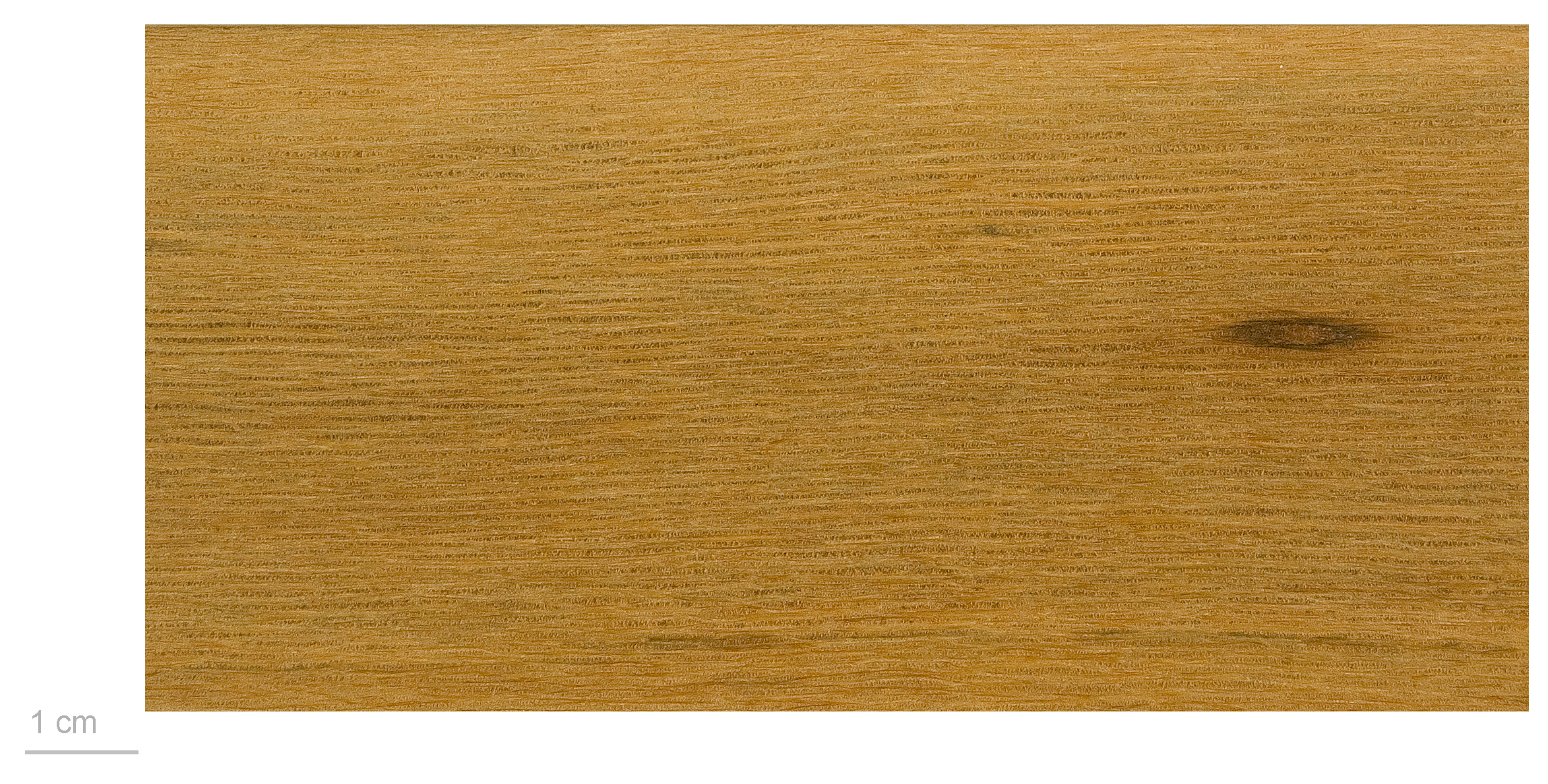
- The wood of Crossostylis grandiflora.

Scientific classification
- Kingdom: Plantae
- Clade: Embryophytes
- Clade: Tracheophytes
- Clade: Angiosperms
- Clade: Eudicots
- Clade: Rosids
- Order: Malpighiales
- Family: Rhizophoraceae
- Genus: Crossostylis; J.R.Forst. & G.Forst.

Type species
- Crossostylis biflora J.R.Forst. & G.Forst.

Species
- 12; see text.

Synonyms
- Haplopetalon A.Gray; Tomostylis Montrouz.

= Crossostylis =

Genus of flowering plants

Crossostylis is a genus of flowering plants in the family Rhizophoraceae. With a distribution spanning the South Pacific, it consists of 12 species of shrubs and trees that reside in tropical environments. The genus was first described by Johann Reinhold Forster and Georg Forster in 1776, and its type species is Crossostylis biflora.

== Species ==
The following list presents its 12 accepted species as of November 2025:

- Crossostylis biflora J.R.Forst. & G.Forst.
- Crossostylis cominsii Hemsl.
- Crossostylis dimera Ding Hou
- Crossostylis grandiflora Brongn.
- Crossostylis harveyi Benth.
- Crossostylis multiflora Brongn. & Gris
- Crossostylis parksii (Gillespie) A.C.Sm.
- Crossostylis pedunculata A.C.Sm.
- Crossostylis raiateensis J.W.Moore
- Crossostylis richii (A.Gray) A.C.Sm.
- Crossostylis sebertii Pancher ex Brongn. & Gris
- Crossostylis seemannii (A.Gray) A.Schimp.
