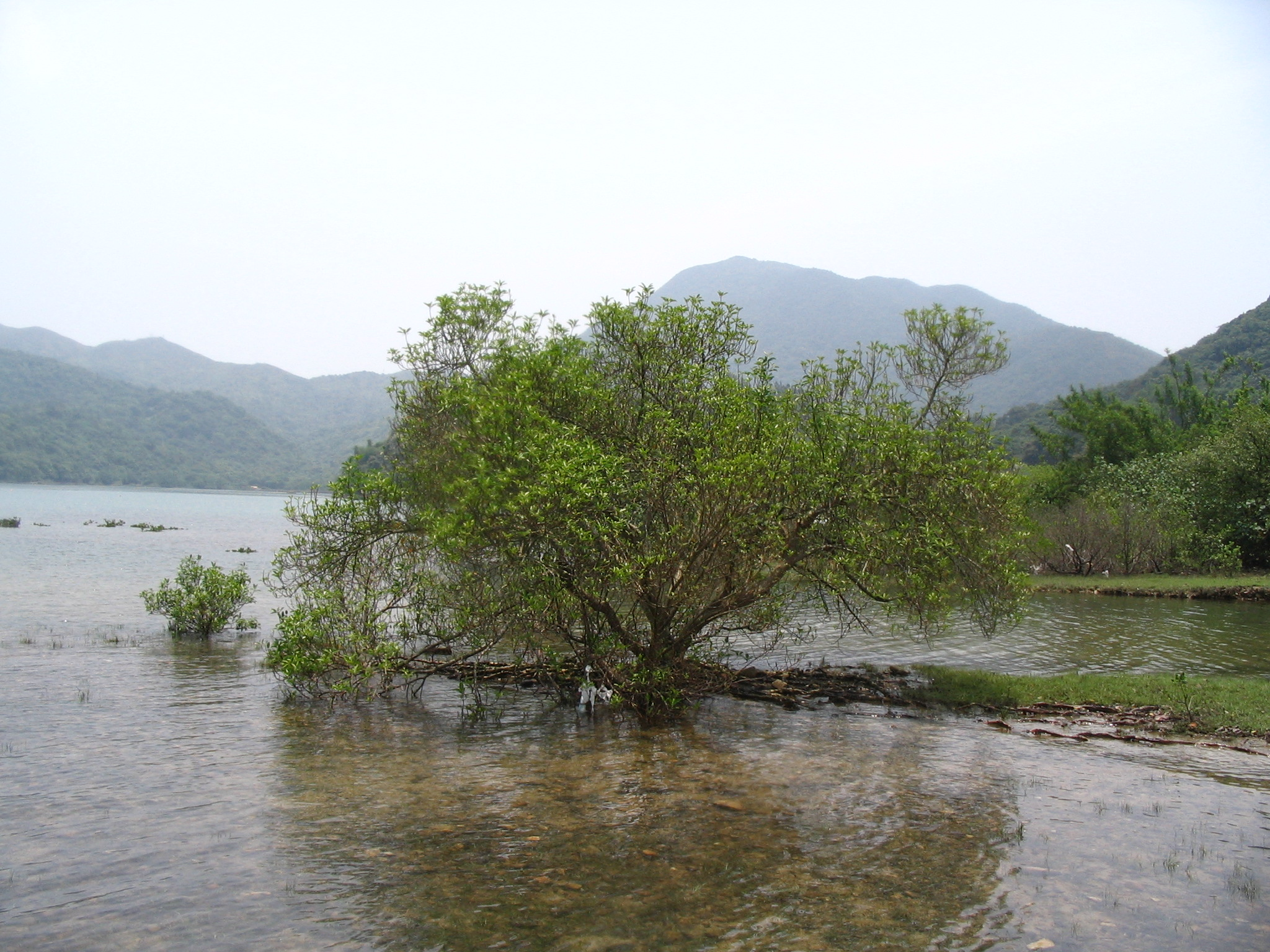
- Kandelia obovata

Scientific classification
- Kingdom: Plantae
- Clade: Tracheophytes
- Clade: Angiosperms
- Clade: Eudicots
- Clade: Rosids
- Order: Malpighiales
- Family: Rhizophoraceae
- Genus: Kandelia (DC.) Wight & Arn.

Species
- See text

= Kandelia =

Genus of flowering plants

Kandelia is a plant genus of two species in the mangrove family Rhizophoraceae.

== Description ==
Kandelia species grow as small mangrove trees. Inflorescences bear 4 to 9 flowers. The fruits are ovoid.

== Distribution and habitat ==
Kandelia species grow in India, China, Japan, Burma, Thailand, Vietnam, Sumatra, Peninsular Malaysia and Borneo. Their habitat is mangrove areas.

== Species ==
As of September 2014 The Plant List and Tropicos recognise 2 species:

- Kandelia candel (L.) Druce
- Kandelia obovata Sheue, H.Y. Liu & J. Yong
