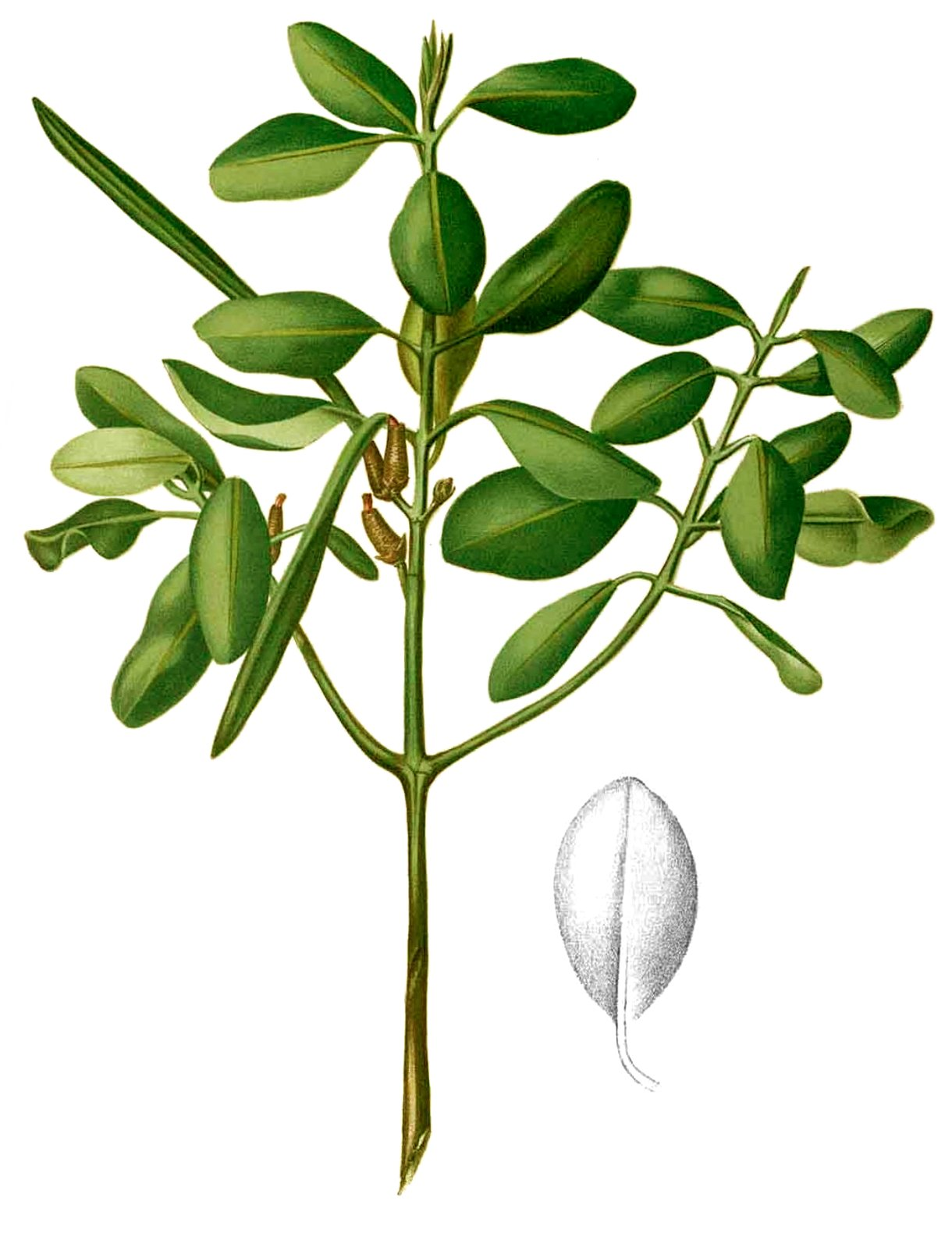
- Ceriops tagal

Scientific classification
- Kingdom: Plantae
- Clade: Tracheophytes
- Clade: Angiosperms
- Clade: Eudicots
- Clade: Rosids
- Order: Malpighiales
- Family: Rhizophoraceae
- Genus: Ceriops; Arn.

= Ceriops =

Genus of flowering plants

Ceriops is a genus of mangroves in the family Rhizophoraceae.

There are 5 accepted species and 17 known synonyms.

== List of species ==
- Ceriops australis (C.T.White) Ballment, T.J.Sm. & J.A.Stoddart
  - Ceriops tagal var. australis C.T.White synonym of Ceriops australis (C.T.White) Ballment, T.J.Sm. & J.A.Stoddart
- Ceriops decandra (Griff.) W.Theob.
  - Ceriops candolleana Náves synonym of Ceriops decandra (Griff.) W.Theob.
  - Ceriops roxburghiana Arn. synonym of Ceriops decandra (Griff.) W.Theob.
- Ceriops pseudodecandra Sheue, H.G.Liu, C.C.Tsai & Yuen P.Yang
- Ceriops tagal (Perr.) C.B.Rob.
  - Ceriops boviniana Tul. synonym of Ceriops tagal (Perr.) C.B.Rob.
  - Ceriops candolleana Arn. synonym of Ceriops tagal (Perr.) C.B.Rob.
  - Ceriops candolleana var. sasakii Hayata synonym of Ceriops tagal (Perr.) C.B.Rob.
  - Ceriops candolleana var. spathulata Blume synonym of Ceriops tagal (Perr.) C.B.Rob.
  - Ceriops forsteniana Blume synonym of Ceriops tagal (Perr.) C.B.Rob.
  - Ceriops globulifera Boreau ex Tul. synonym of Ceriops tagal (Perr.) C.B.Rob.
  - Ceriops lucida Miq. synonym of Ceriops tagal (Perr.) C.B.Rob.
  - Ceriops lucida var. latifolia Miq. synonym of Ceriops tagal (Perr.) C.B.Rob.
  - Ceriops lucida var. subspathulata Miq. synonym of Ceriops tagal (Perr.) C.B.Rob.
  - Ceriops mossambicensis Klotzsch synonym of Ceriops tagal (Perr.) C.B.Rob.
  - Ceriops pauciflora Benth. synonym of Ceriops tagal (Perr.) C.B.Rob.
  - Ceriops somalensis Chiov. synonym of Ceriops tagal (Perr.) C.B.Rob.
  - Ceriops timoriensis Domin synonym of Ceriops tagal (Perr.) C.B.Rob.
  - Ceriops timoriensis (DC.) C.A.Gardner synonym of Ceriops tagal (Perr.) C.B.Rob.
- Ceriops zippeliana Blume
