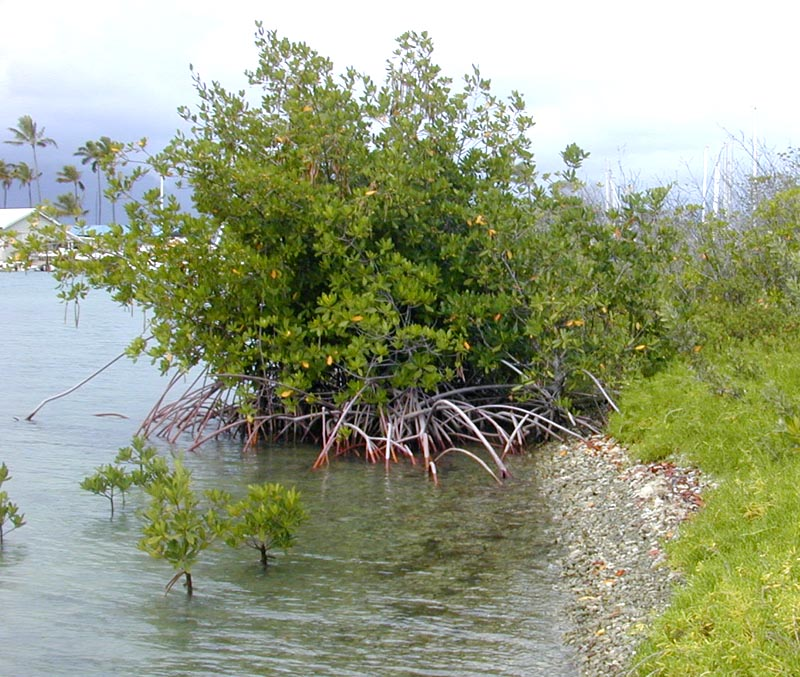
- Young Rhizophora mangle, a mangrove

Scientific classification
- Kingdom: Plantae
- Clade: Embryophytes
- Clade: Tracheophytes
- Clade: Angiosperms
- Clade: Eudicots
- Clade: Rosids
- Order: Malpighiales
- Family: Rhizophoraceae; R.Br. in Flinders

Genera
- See text
- The range of Rhizophoraceae: Tropical trees; Mangroves

= Rhizophoraceae =

Rhizophoraceae Temporal range: Cenomanian–recent

Family of flowering plants

The Rhizophoraceae is a family of tropical or subtropical flowering plants. It includes around 147 species distributed in 15 genera. Under the family, there are three tribes, Rhizophoreae, Gynotrocheae, and Macarisieae. Even though Rhizophoraceae is known for its mangrove members, only the genera under Rhizophoreae grow in the mangrove habitats and the remaining members live in inland forests.

== Taxonomy ==
This family is now placed in the order Malpighiales, though under the Cronquist system, they formed an order in themselves (Rhizophorales). It is sister group to Erythroxylaceae. The sister group to the tribe Rhizophoreae is Gynotrocheae. The generic relationships within the Macarisiae are not fully resolved.

Within the mangrove tribe Rhizophoreae, there are four genera: Rhizophora, Kandelia, Ceriops, and Bruguiera. Bruguiera is the basal genus and Rhizophora the most derived genus in the tribe. Rhizophora is the only pan-tropical genus that is distributed along the intertidal zones of both the Indo-West Pacific (IWP) and Atlantic-East Pacific (AEP) regions. The remaining mangrove genera are restricted to the IWP region.

== Genera ==
As of September 2024, Plants of the World Online accepted these genera:

- Anopyxis (Pierre) Engl.
- Blepharistemma Wall. ex Benth.
- Bruguiera Lam. ex Savigny
- Carallia Roxb.
- Cassipourea Aubl.
- Ceriops Arn.
- Comiphyton Floret
- Crossostylis J.R.Forst. & G.Forst.
- Gynotroches Blume
- Kandelia Wight & Arn.
- Macarisia Thouars
- Paradrypetes Kuhlm.
- Pellacalyx Korth.
- Rhizophora L.
- Sterigmapetalum Kuhlm.

== Morphological Characteristics ==
The tribe Macarisieae is characterized by a few plesiomorphies unknown in the rest of the family, such as superior ovary position, the presence of a seed appendage, and the absence of aerial roots.

Within Gynotrocheae, Crossostylis is morphologically distinct from other Gynotrocheae in having capsular fruits that split open at maturity and an appendage on a mature seed. In addition, Crossostylis possesses a multi-celled archesporium in ovules just like members in Macarisieae, while the archesporium is one-celled in the other Gynotrocheae.

Among Rhizophoreae, there are three distinctive characters known as the adaptive features to the mangrove habitats: viviparous embryogenesis, high salt tolerance and aerial roots.

Vivipary: The embryo of Rhizophoreae starts germination without dormancy. It grows out of the seed coat and the fruit while still remain attached to the parent plant. Although vivipary is found in other unrelated mangrove taxa such as Avicennia (Acanthaceae), Nypa (Arecaceae), and Pelliciera (Tetrameristaceae), they only break the seed coat but not the fruit wall before they split open. Vivipary in Rhizophoreae include several embryological characteristics: (1) the active growth of a hypocotyl meristem in the cotyledonary body, with endosperm overflow from the embryo sac. The growth of an endosperm can force open the micropyle, so that the embryo develops out of the integument. 2) The development of cotyledons as a cylindrical body. (3) The development of just one embryo, with other ovules being aborted after anthesis.

Wood anatomy: Rhizophoreae possess narrow and dense vessels. These wood structures keep the xylem sap in high tension to absorb water, resulting in a high sodium chloride concentration and high osmotic potential. Terrestrial species in Rhizophoreae could not survive in the intertidal zone because the osmatic potential in the sea water would be much higher than that in the xylem sap of the tree, resulting in water loss and disruption of cellular functions.

Aerial roots: Instead of having tap roots deep underground, Rhizophoreae develop roots that branch out from the stem some distance above the soil surface. Underground roots, like all plant tissues, require oxygen for respiration. In underground soils of terrestrial habitats, gas exchanges take place at the interstitial pores among the soil particles. In waterlogged soils, the diffusion rate of oxygen is extremely low. Rhizophoreae adapts to the anaerobic soils by having extensive roots above the ground which increases the surface area for gas exchanges. The surface of aerial roots carry numerous gas exchange pores called lenticels, through which oxygen could diffuse into the underground tissues with air-filled spaces.

== Evolutionary history ==
The ancestor of Rhizophoraceae experienced two whole genome duplication events. The first duplication event corresponds to the triplication shared among angiosperms. The second duplication event was dated to ~74.6 million years ago (mya). Around 66 mya, the planet underwent the Cretaceous–Tertiary mass extinction. Then around 56.4 mya, the mangrove lineage diverged from its terrestrial relatives. The divergence happened to occur in the time frame with in the extreme global warming event, the Paleocene-Eocene Thermal Maximum (PETM). During this time period, there is a shift from a terrestrial to a marine, potentially anoxic, sedimentary depositional environment, suggesting a sea level rise. After the dramatic global warming period, the mangrove species within Rhizophoraceae diversified within 10 mya, which is relatively short in evolutionary sense. Although the sequence of the events does not suggest an absolute causal relationships between the former and the latter, a reasonable hypothesis for the diversification of Rhizophoraceae could be formulated: The second event of whole genome duplication increased the adaptability of the ancestor of Rhizophoraceae and chances of survival during the Cretaceous-Tertiary mass extinction by generating novel genetic materials for evolution to work on. During the PETM global warming period, the terrestrial ancestors of Rhizophoraceae living close to the shore were forced into the intertidal zone because of a large-scale sea-level rise. This sea level change exerted some selective pressure on the ancestors of Rhizophoraceae and those that were successfully adapted to the intertidal zone diverged from their terrestrial relatives and colonized this new habitat. Eventually, differential habitats within the intertidal zone resulted in the speciation within the mangrove lineage of Rhizophoraceae.
