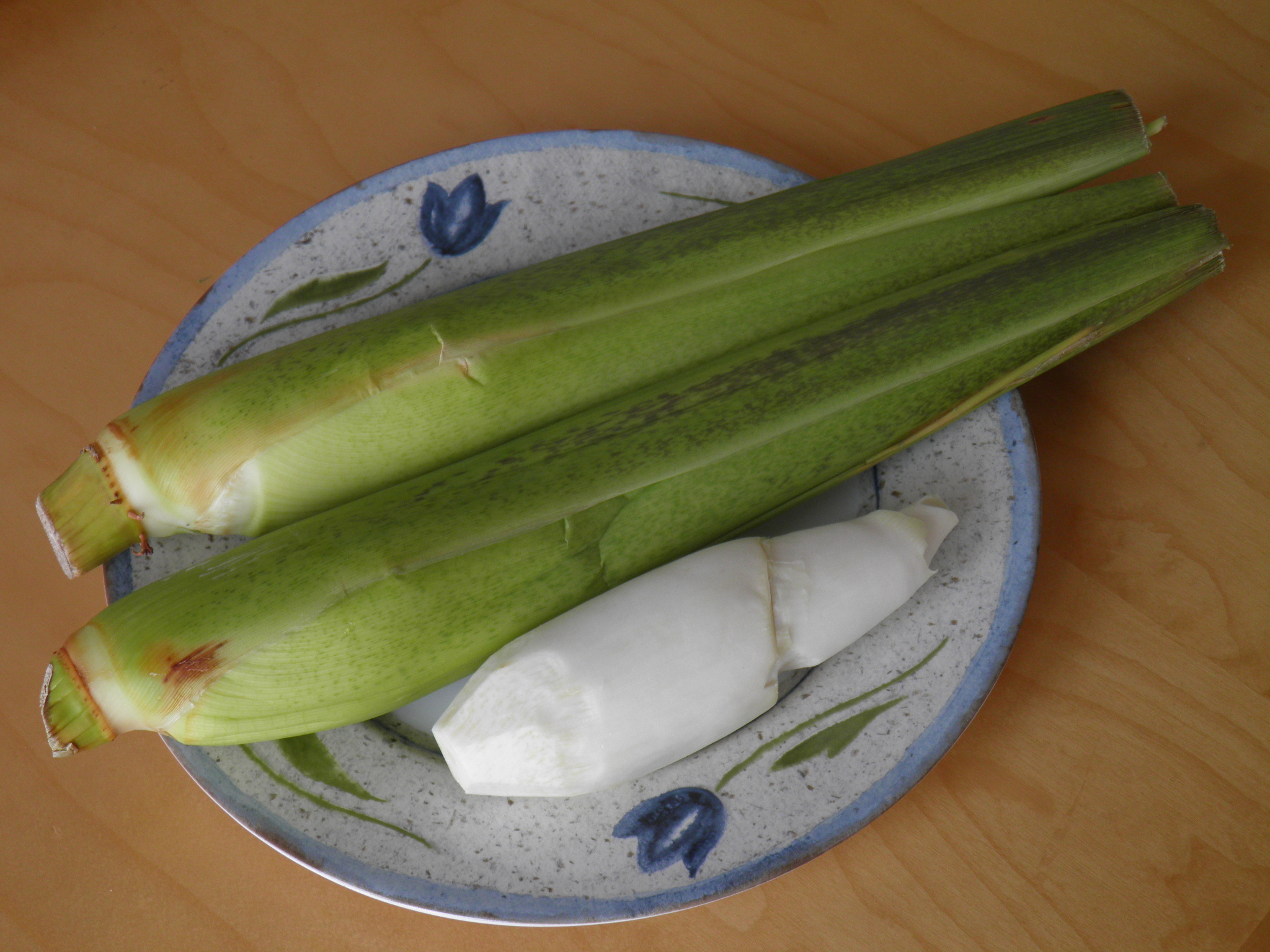
- Zizania latifolia stems galled by smut fungus

Scientific classification
- Kingdom: Fungi
- Division: Basidiomycota
- Class: Ustilaginomycetes
- Order: Ustilaginales
- Family: Ustilaginaceae
- Genus: Ustilago
- Species: U. esculenta

Binomial name
- Ustilago esculenta Henn. (1895)

Synonyms
- Melanopsichium esculentum (Henn.) Mundk. & Thirum. (1946); Yenia esculenta (Henn.) Liou (1949)

= Ustilago esculenta =

Species of fungus

Ustilago esculenta is a species of fungus in the Ustilaginaceae, a family of smut fungi. It is in the same genus as the fungi that cause corn smut, loose smut of barley, false loose smut, covered smut of barley, loose smut of oats, and other grass diseases. This species is pathogenic as well, attacking Manchurian wild rice (Zizania latifolia), also known as Manchurian ricegrass, Asian wild rice, and wateroat. This grass is its only known host.

== Uses ==
=== Food ===
Zizania latifolia is grown as an agricultural crop across Asia. The success of the crop depends on the smut fungus. The grass is not grown for its grain, as are other wild rice species, but for the stems, which swell into juicy galls when infected with the smut. The galled stems are harvested as a vegetable called gau-soon and kal-peh-soon (Pe̍h-ōe-jī: kha-pe̍h-sún; also, gau sun and kah peh sung) and jiaobai in China. Its Japanese name is makomotake. The galled section of the stem is 3 to 4 centimeters (1.2 to 1.6 in) wide and up to 20 centimeters (10 in) long. This vegetable has been grown for centuries in China, at least 400 years. It is popular for its flavor and tender texture. Its taste resembles fresh bamboo shoots. It is eaten raw or cooked. It stays crisp when stir-fried. The main harvesting season is between September and November. This is also typhoon season in parts of Asia, a time when many other vegetables are unavailable. This makes the product more attractive to consumers.

When the fungus invades the host plant it causes it to hypertrophy, its cells increasing in size and number. The fungus destroys the flowering structures of the plant, so it does not make seed. The crop is propagated asexually, by rhizome. New sprouts are infected by spores in the environment, which is generally a paddy. The fungus can also be transmitted directly in the rhizome.

If conditions such as temperature are off, the stem becomes filled with dark-colored, sand-like fungal spores instead of swelling into a vegetable, ruining the crop. Also, there are two known strains of the fungus. One causes the swelling of the stem tissues which produces the vegetable, but the other does not; instead, it fills the stem with spores.

=== Other uses ===
Besides food, the smut-infested stems of the plant have been used medicinally in the treatment of hypertension and heart disease. The spores themselves are used in art. They serve as pigment in Japanese lacquerware, where their brownish color produces a rusty tone to the work. There is a case report of a lacquerware artist who developed hypersensitivity pneumonitis after dusting her work with the spores and then blowing off the excess.

== Control ==
This fungus is federally regulated in the United States. It is thought to pose a threat to North American wild rice. As it prevents the flowering and seed-producing ability of Asian wild rice, it is feared that it could halt grain production if it successfully attacked the local wild rice species. Despite quarantines, a small plot of smut-infested Z. latifolia was discovered growing near Modesto, California, in 1991, and it was destroyed to prevent its spread.
