= Flail (tool) =

Agricultural tool used for threshing

Flail
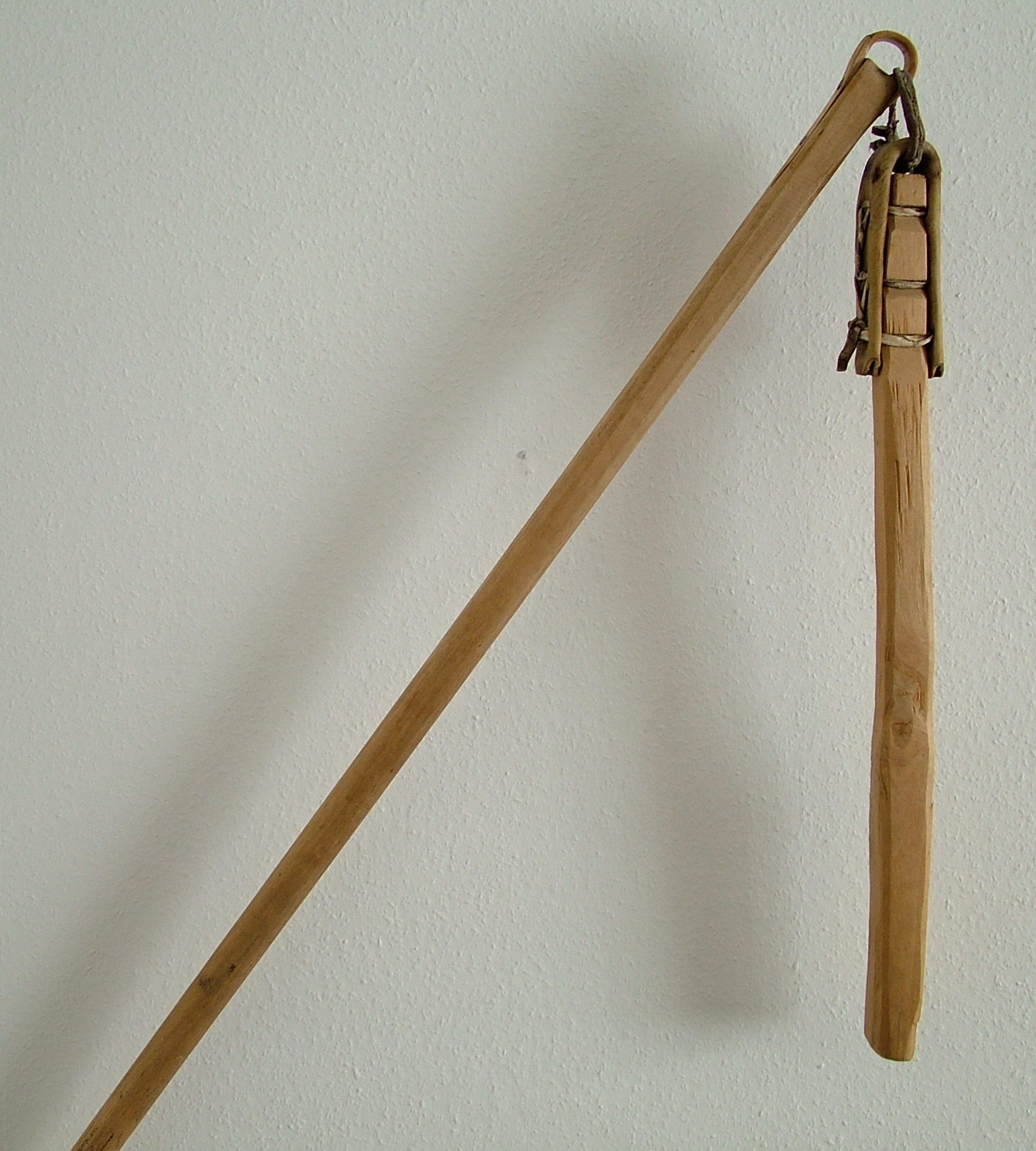
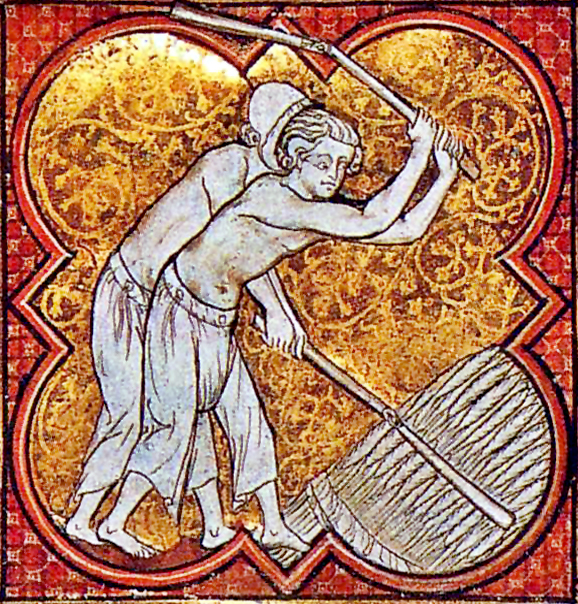
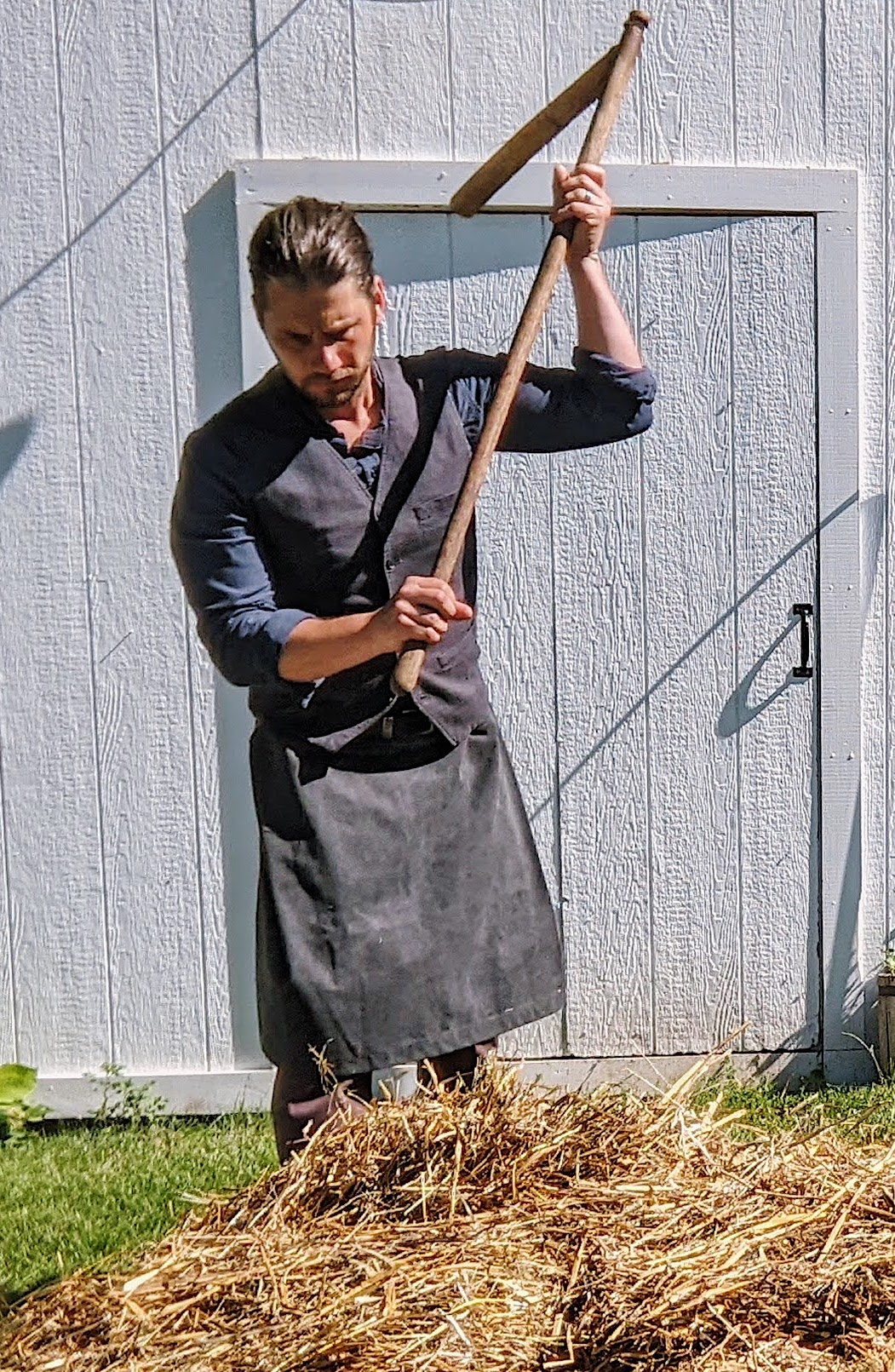
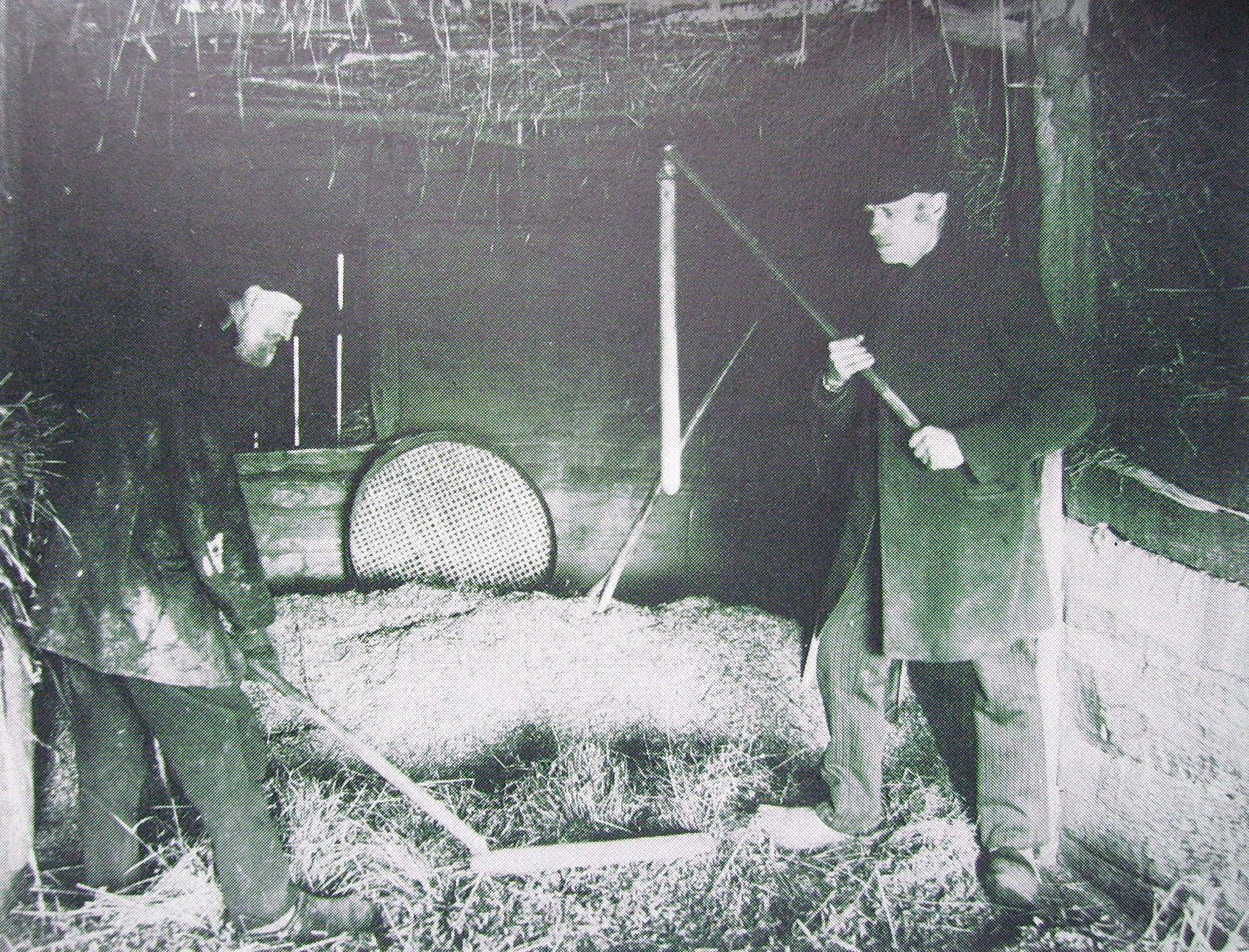
- Top left: Example of a flail (Northern Scandinavia): handle (left) and swingle (right)
- Top right: French peasants threshing with flails c. 1270
- Bottom left: Flail being used for threshing
- Bottom right: Threshing with flail, Västergötland, Sweden (1903)

A flail is an agricultural hand tool used for threshing, the process of separating grains from their husks. It can also be used for military purposes being made in the same way as a threshing-flail but much stronger and furnished with iron spikes.

== Agricultural use ==
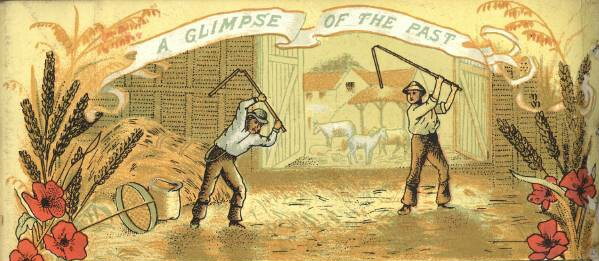
Flails used in Britain

An agricultural flail consists of a short thick club called a "swingle" or "swipple" attached by a rope or leather thong to a wooden handle in such a manner as to enable it to swing freely. The handle is gripped and swung, causing the swingle to strike a pile of grain and loosen the grain's husks. The precise dimensions and shape of flails were determined by generations of farmers to suit the particular grain they were harvesting. For example, flails used by farmers in Quebec to process wheat were generally made from two pieces of wood, the handle being about 1.5 m (4.9 ft) long by 3 cm (1.2 in) in diameter, and the second stick being about 1 m (3.3 ft) long by about 3 cm (1.2 in) in diameter, with a slight taper towards the end. Flails for other grains, such as rice or spelt, would have had different dimensions.

The farmworker who uses the flail is known as a thresher or historically a thrasher. In modern times this manual process has largely been replaced by technologies provided by combine harvesters. In Minnesota, natural wild rice in public waters must generally be harvested from a hand-propelled boat, skiff, or canoe using hand-operated flails no longer than 30 inches (76 cm) and weighing no more than one pound.

== Military use ==
Agricultural flails were occasionally adapted for use as weapons, particularly during periods of peasant unrest and warfare. The flail is proposed as one of the origins of the two-piece baton known in the Okinawan kobudō weapon system as the nunchaku. One of the first recorded use of a flail as a weapon was at the siege of Damietta in 1218 during the Fifth Crusade, as depicted in the chronicle by Matthew Paris, though there are several references that predate this; tradition has it the man was the Frisian Hayo of Wolvega who bashed the standard bearer of the Muslim defenders with it and captured the flag. Flails were also used as weapons by farmers under the leadership of Jan Žižka during the 15th-century Hussite Wars in Bohemia.

In ancient Egypt what has popularly been interpreted as a flail was a symbol associated with the pharaoh, said to symbolize the monarch's ability to provide for the people, though it is currently still not known exactly what the "flail" implement seen in artwork actually was.

A mechanized form of flail, similar to a combine harvester, also exist militarily for demining, called a mine flail. It is vehicle-mounted and makes a safe path through a minefield by deliberately detonating land mines in front of the vehicle that carries it. The mine flail consists of a number of heavy chains ending in fist-sized steel balls (flails) that are attached to a horizontal, rapidly rotating rotor mounted on two arms in front of the vehicle. The rotor's rotation makes the flails spin wildly and violently pound the ground. The force of a flail strike above a buried mine mimics the weight of a person or vehicle and causes the mine to detonate, but in a safe manner that does little damage to the flails or the vehicle.

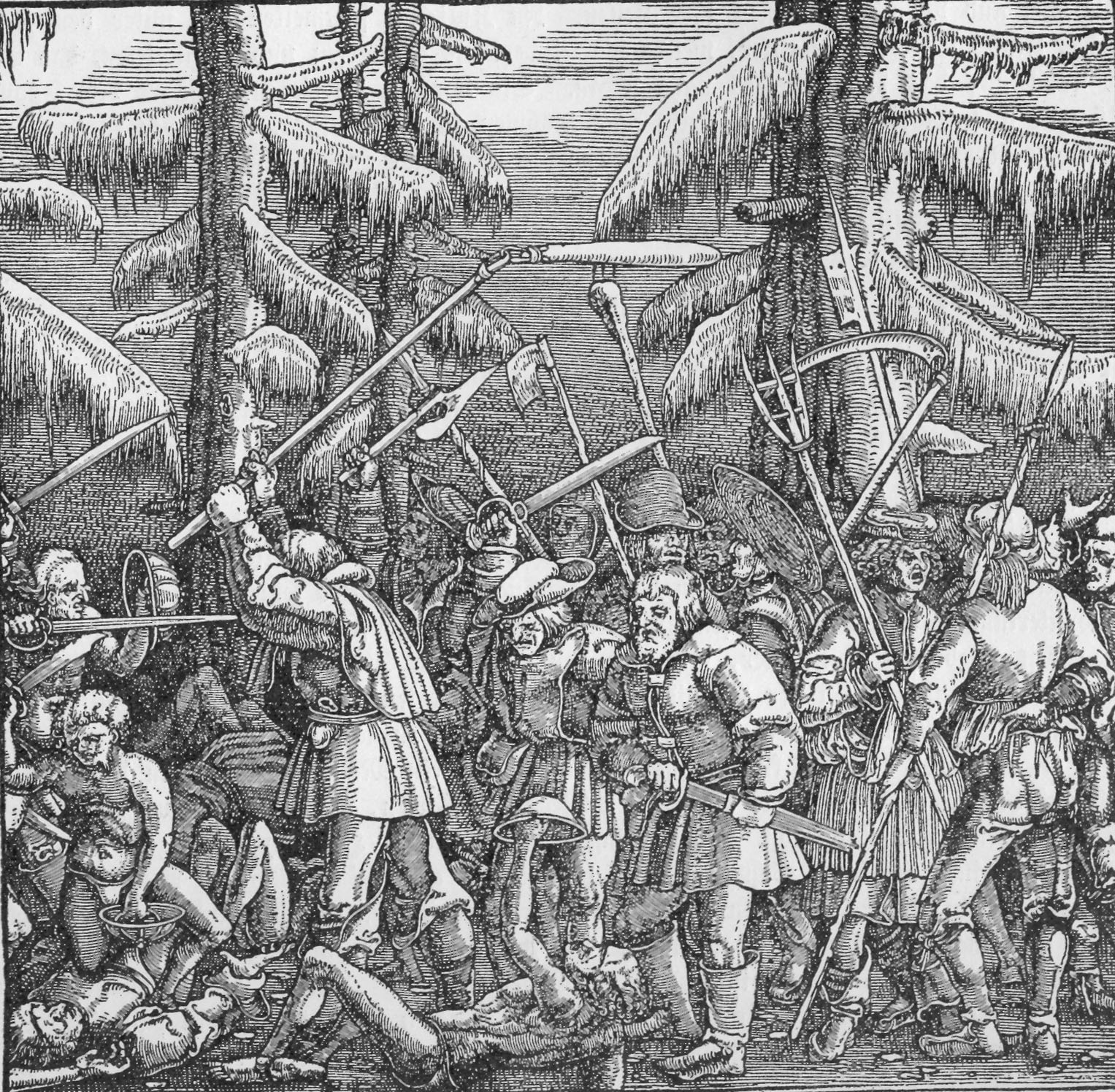
17th century drawing of a peasant revolt, showing a man swining a flail

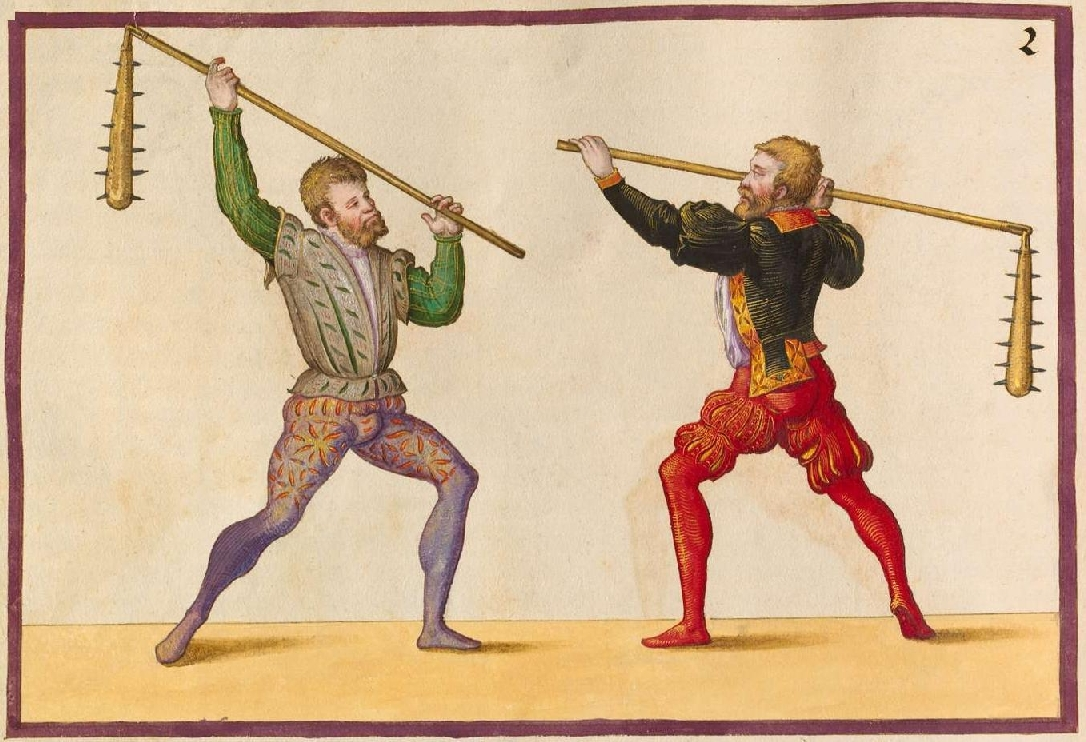
Renaissance era combat manual featuring spiked flails

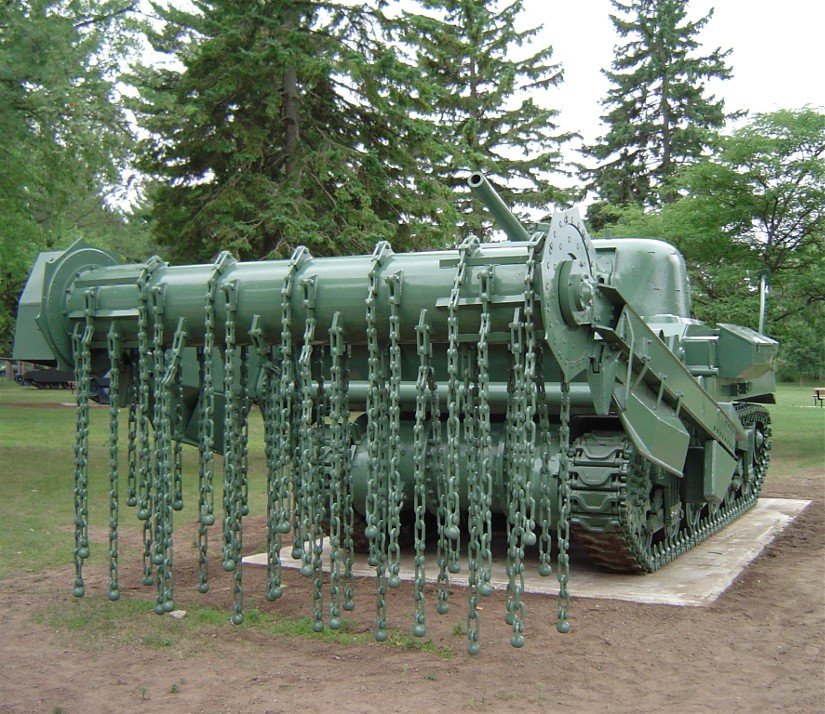
Mine flail mounted on a M4 Sherman tank

== Iconography ==
Pharaohs often displayed it in an appearance of holding the crook and flail in Ancient Egypt.

Flails were often arranged on the Western coat of arms to symbolize agriculture.

Coat of arms of Teuva, Finland

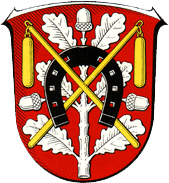
Crest of Mörfelden-Walldorf, Germany

== See also ==
- Flail (weapon)
- Ricing stick
- Two-section staff
- Three-section staff
- Nunchaku
- Gohei
- Ōnusa
