= False loose smut =

Scientific classification
- Kingdom: Fungi
- Division: Basidiomycota
- Class: Ustilaginomycetes
- Order: Ustilaginales
- Family: Ustilaginaceae
- Genus: Ustilago
- Species: U. nigra

Binomial name
- Ustilago nigra Tapke (1932)

Species of fungus

False loose smut is a fungal disease of barley caused by Ustilago nigra. This fungus is very similar to U. nuda, the cause of loose smut, and was first distinguished from it in 1932.

== Symptoms ==
The disease is not apparent until heading, at which time, smutted heads emerge slightly earlier than healthy heads. At first, each smutted head is covered by a delicate, paperlike, grayish membrane. These membranes break shortly after the smutted heads have emerged and expose a dark brown to black, powdery mass of spores. These spores are easily dislodged, leaving only the bare rachis.

== Disease cycle ==
The disease cycle of Ustilago nigra is similar to that of U. hordei, the cause of covered smut of barley. The teliospores survive on the surface or in the soil. In some cases, the teliospores that are deposited under the hull, may germinate immediately. The mycelium then grows into the lower layers of the seed and then remains dormant until seed germination.

Infection of seedling occurs between germination and emergence. Infection can occur from seed-borne teliospores or by teliospores residing in the soil. Relatively dry soil at temperatures of 15–21 °C, are most favorable for infection. The invading mycelium becomes established within the growing point. As the plant enters the boot stage, the mycelium grows rapidly into the floral tissue which is converted to masses of black teliospores. Teliospores are disseminated by wind or during combining. The teliospores may remain viable for several spores.

== Management ==
The incidence of false loose smut can be reduced by using clean seed, treated seed and resistant cultivars.
