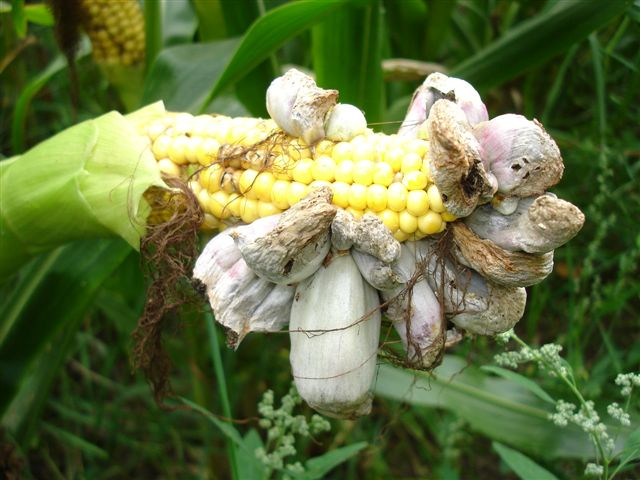
- Ustilago maydis (Corn smut)

Scientific classification
- Kingdom: Fungi
- Division: Basidiomycota
- Class: Ustilaginomycetes
- Order: Ustilaginales
- Family: Ustilaginaceae
- Genus: Ustilago (Pers.) Roussel 1806

Type species
- Ustilago hordei (Pers.) Lagerh.

= Ustilago =

Genus of fungi

Ustilago is a genus of approximately 200 smut fungi, which are parasitic on grasses. 170 species are accepted by Wijayawardene et al. 2020; After phylogenetic research certain species in Ustilago, Macalpinomyces, and other genera in the Ustilaginaceae clade have been moved to other genera such as Mycosarcoma.

== Uses ==
Ustilago maydis is eaten as a traditional Mexican food in many parts of the country, and is even available canned. Farmers have even been known to spread the spores around on purpose to create more of the fungus. It is known in central Mexico by the Nahuatl name huitlacoche. Peasants in other parts of the country call it "hongo de maíz," i.e. "maize fungus."

The genome of U. maydis has been sequenced in 2006.

== Hosts ==
Some selected species and hosts;

- Ustilago avenae (Pers.) Rostr. - loose smut of oats
- U. brizae - on Briza media
- U. bullata - brome smut
- U. cynodontis - Bermuda grass smut
- U. esculenta P. Henn. - Zizania smut
- U. hordei (Pers.) Lagerh. 1889 - covered smut (barley)
- U. maydis (DC.) Corda - corn smut
- U. nuda (C.N. Jensen) Kellerm. & Swingle - loose smut of barley
- U. residua - on Danthonia californica
- U. serpens
- U. trichophora - on Echinochloa crus-galli and other Echinochloa species
- U. tritici C. Bauhin - loose smut of wheat

== See also ==
- Corn smut
