= Macalpinomyces =

Scientific classification
- Kingdom: Fungi
- Division: Basidiomycota
- Class: Ustilaginomycetes
- Order: Ustilaginales
- Family: Ustilaginaceae
- Genus: Macalpinomyces; Langdon & Full., in Trans. Br. mycol. Soc. 68 (1): 30. 1977.

Type species
- Macalpinomyces eriachnes (Thüm.) Langdon & Full., 1977

Species
- See text

Synonyms
- Endosporisorium Vánky

Genus of fungi

Macalpinomyces is a fungus genus in the Ustilaginaceae family.

It has a widespread distribution, almost worldwide. These smut fungi from Ustilaginomycotina contain about 540 described species. Species from the complex often possess characteristics that occur in more than one genus, creating uncertainty for species placement.

The genus name of Macalpinomyces is in honour of Daniel McAlpine (1849–1932), who was a Scottish-born Australian mycologist known for his research in plant pathology.

The genus was circumscribed by Raymond Forbes Newton Langdon and R.A. Fullerton in Trans. Brit. Mycol. Soc. vol.68 Issue 1, on page 30 in 1977.

Langdon & Fullerton (1977) established Macalpinomyces to accommodate M. eriachnes, which they considered as distinct from Sporisorium and Ustilago (other Smut (fungus) genera). As Macalpinomyces lacked columellae, produced sterile cells and the spores were uniformly ornamented and polyangular or sub-polyangular (Langdon & Fullerton 1977, Vánky 1996). The original collection of M. eriachnes in Australia by the botanist Ferdinand von Mueller, was divided and sent to two mycologists, Mordecai Cooke in England and Felix von Thümen in Germany. They studied the specimens separately and then two new fungal taxa were described based on this single collection, Sorosporium eriachnes by Thümen in 1878 and Ustilago australis by Cooke in 1879. Daniel McAlpine noted that the 2 types had large, smooth thick-walled cells. Langdon & Fullerton (1977) agreed with McAlpine and later transferred this smut to a new genus, Macalpinomyces, nearly a century after the specimen was first described.

Vánky in 1996, broadened the description of Macalpinomyces to include taxa that lacked a columella but possessed sterile cells, which are morphological features shared by both Sporisorium and Ustilago.

Molecular phylogenetic analysis has shown that Macalpinomyces is polyphyletic. Species of Macalpinomyces have sterile cells, a peridium derived from host material and lack true spore balls (Vánky 2011b). Vánky (2011b) accepted 46 species of Macalpinomyces.

The type species M. eriachnes was originally described from a specimen collected in northern Australia on the grass genus Eriachne in 1855. 10 new species were found in 2017, on the same grass in northern Australia. Begerow et al. (2006), in their phylogenetic study of the Ustilaginomycotina, proposed that M. eriachnes might not belong to the Ustilaginaceae family as it did not occur in the clade containing Sporisorium, Ustilago and Moesziomyces.

Macalpinomyces tilletioides and Sporisorium penniseticola, were both found on Pennisetum sphacelatum in Ethiopia. Species Macalpinomyces trichopterygis and Macalpinomyces tristachyae are found in South Africa. Panicum sumatrense, also known as little millet, is affected by Macalpinomyces sharmae.

== Species ==
As of July 2022 GBIF accepts the following species:

- Macalpinomyces aristidae-cyananthae (Bref.) Vánky
- Macalpinomyces arundinellae-setosae R.G.Shivas & Vánky
- Macalpinomyces australiensis Ying M.Li, R.G.Shivas, McTaggart & L.Cai
- Macalpinomyces brachiariae Vánky, C.Vánky & R.G.Shivas
- Macalpinomyces chloridii (L.Ling) Vánky
- Macalpinomyces chrysopogonicola (Mundk. & Thirum.) Vánky
- Macalpinomyces chrysopogonis (S.Ahmad) Vánky
- Macalpinomyces cookei Ying M.Li, R.G.Shivas, McTaggart & L.Cai
- Macalpinomyces eendrachtslandiae Ying M.Li, R.G.Shivas, McTaggart & L.Cai
- Macalpinomyces effusus (Syd. & P.Syd.) Vánky
- Macalpinomyces elionuri-tripsacoidis Vánky
- Macalpinomyces elymandrae (Vienn.-Bourg.) Vánky
- Macalpinomyces eragrostiellae Vánky & C.Vánky
- Macalpinomyces eriachnes (Thüm.) Langdon & Full.
- Macalpinomyces flaccidus S.H.He & L.Guo
- Macalpinomyces fullertonii Ying M.Li, R.G.Shivas, McTaggart & L.Cai
- Macalpinomyces langdonii Ying M.Li, R.G.Shivas, McTaggart & L.Cai
- Macalpinomyces leptocarydionis Vánky
- Macalpinomyces loudetiae (Vienn.-Bourg.) Vánky
- Macalpinomyces loudetiopsidis Vánky
- Macalpinomyces magicus Vánky & T.Vánky
- Macalpinomyces muelleri Ying M.Li, R.G.Shivas, McTaggart & L.Cai
- Macalpinomyces neglectus (Niessl) Vánky
- Macalpinomyces nigritanae Vánky
- Macalpinomyces nodiglumis Vánky
- Macalpinomyces novae-hollandiae Ying M.Li, R.G.Shivas, McTaggart & L.Cai
- Macalpinomyces panici Vánky
- Macalpinomyces patilorum Vánky & A.R.Patil
- Macalpinomyces pogonarthriae Vánky & C.Vánky
- Macalpinomyces pretoriensis (Pole-Evans) Vánky
- Macalpinomyces sharmae Vánky
- Macalpinomyces siamensis R.G.Shivas, Vánky & Athip.
- Macalpinomyces simplex Vánky
- Macalpinomyces spermophorus (Berk. & M.A.Curtis ex de Toni) Vánky
- Macalpinomyces spinulosus (L.Ling) Vánky
- Macalpinomyces sporoboli (Tracy & Earle) Vánky
- Macalpinomyces tanakae (S.Ito) Vánky
- Macalpinomyces terrae-australis Ying M.Li, R.G.Shivas, McTaggart & L.Cai
- Macalpinomyces thuemenii Ying M.Li, R.G.Shivas, McTaggart & L.Cai
- Macalpinomyces tilletioides Vánky
- Macalpinomyces trichopterygis Vánky & C.Vánky
- Macalpinomyces tripogonis (M.S.Patil) Vánky
- Macalpinomyces tristachyae Vánky & C.Vánky
- Macalpinomyces tuberculatus Vánky
- Macalpinomyces ugandensis Vánky
- Macalpinomyces vankyi Ying M.Li, R.G.Shivas, McTaggart & L.Cai
- Macalpinomyces viridans R.G.Shivas, McTaggart & Vánky
- Macalpinomyces zonotriches Vánky
