= Bambusiomyces =

Scientific classification
- Kingdom: Fungi
- Division: Basidiomycota
- Class: Ustilaginomycetes
- Order: Ustilaginales
- Family: Ustilaginaceae
- Genus: Bambusiomyces; Vánky (2011)
- Species: B. shiraianus

Binomial name
- Bambusiomyces shiraianus (Henn.) K.Vánky (2011)

Synonyms
- Ustilago shiraiana Henn. (1900)

Genus of fungi

Bambusiomyces is a fungal genus in the family Ustilaginaceae. It was circumscribed in 2011 to contain the smut fungus formerly known as Ustilago shiraina, originally described by German mycologist Paul Christoph Hennings from Japan in 1900. The fungus was originally found growing on wild Japanese bamboo, Bambusa veitchii, but has since been isolated from several plants belonging to tribe Bambuseae in the grass family Poaceae. In addition to Japan, it is also found in China and other locales in southeast Asia, and has been introduced to the United States.
