= Ahmadiago =

Scientific classification
- Domain: Eukaryota
- Kingdom: Fungi
- Division: Basidiomycota
- Class: Ustilaginomycetes
- Order: Ustilaginales
- Family: Ustilaginaceae
- Genus: Ahmadiago; Vánky (2004)
- Species: A. euphorbiae

Binomial name
- Ahmadiago euphorbiae (Mundk.) Vánky (2004)

Synonyms
- Ustilago euphorbiae Mundk. (1941)

Genus of fungi

Ahmadiago is a fungal genus in the family Ustilaginaceae. It was circumscribed in 2004 to contain the smut fungus formerly known as Ustilago euphorbiae, found in India. The generic name honours Pakistani botanist and mycologist Sultan Ahmad.
