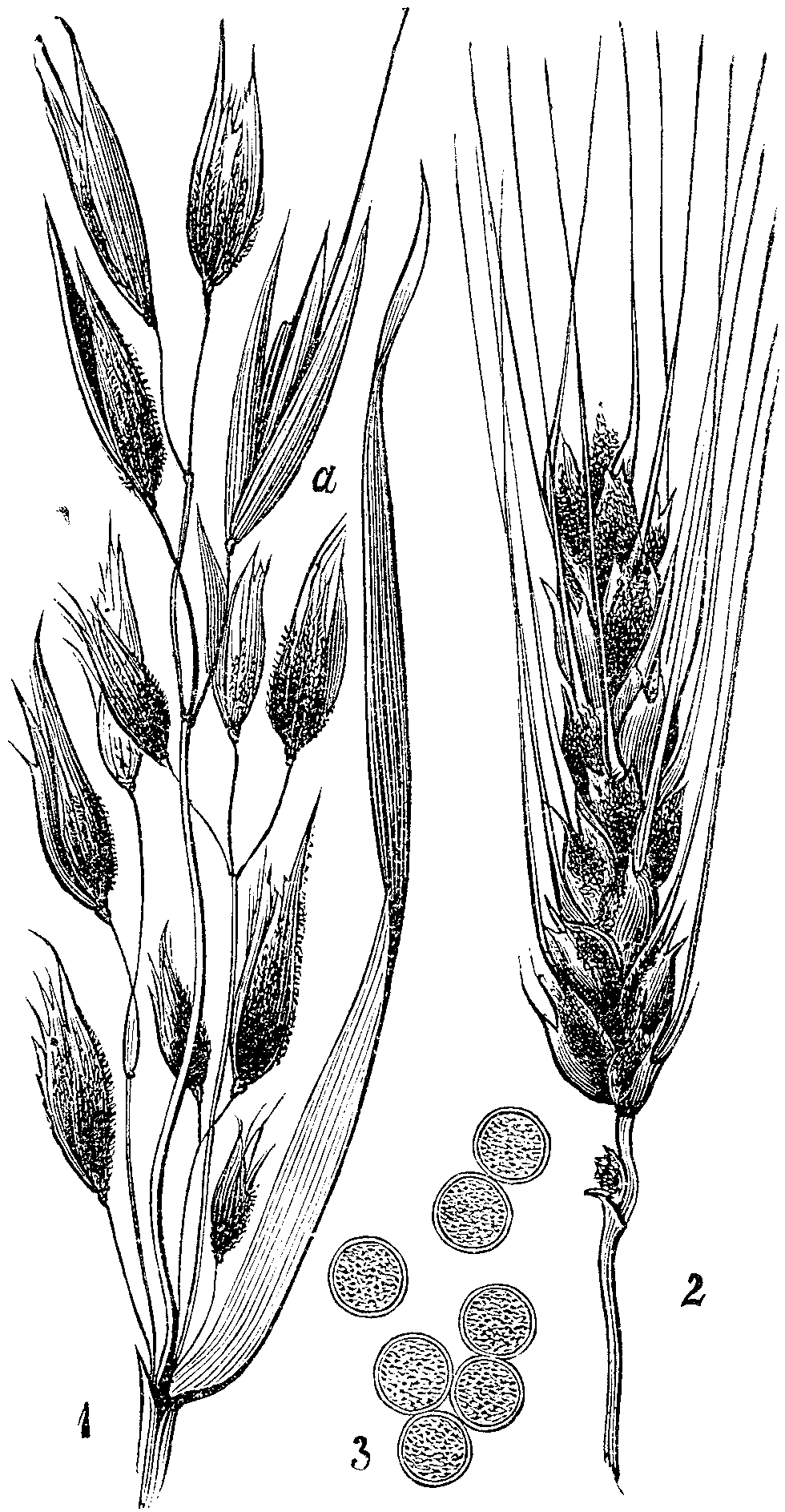
- Result of covered smut on oat (1) and barley (2), illustration published in M. Cilenšek: Naše škodljive rastline (1892)

Scientific classification
- Domain: Eukaryota
- Kingdom: Fungi
- Division: Basidiomycota
- Class: Ustilaginomycetes
- Order: Ustilaginales
- Family: Ustilaginaceae
- Genus: Ustilago
- Species: U. hordei

Binomial name
- Ustilago hordei (Pers.) Lagerh.

= Covered smut (barley) =

Species of fungus

Covered smut of barley is caused by the fungus Ustilago hordei. The disease is found worldwide and it is more extensively distributed than either loose smut or false loose smut.

== Symptoms ==
Infected plants do not demonstrate symptoms until heading. Kernels of infected plants are replaced by masses of dark brown smut spores. Smutted heads are hard and compact. Infected plants may be stunted. Occasionally smut sori may also develop in leaf blades, where they appear as long streaks.

== Disease cycle ==
Infection is seed-borne within the seed, the fungus penetrating the endosperm while the grain is being formed. Infected seeds give rise to systemically infected plants. The mycelium advances through the host tissue and becomes established behind the growing point.

The spores are not readily blown or washed away by wind or rain. Spores are sticky in nature when present inside the membrane due to oily coating. At harvest, spore masses are broken up, scattering spores on grain. Frequently, masses of spores remain intact and appear in harvested grain. The fungus overwinters as teliospores on seed or in soil.

== Pathotypes ==
At least 13 pathotypes are known; virulence is governed by at least three single recessive and independent gene pairs.

== Management ==
Resistant cultivars and seed treatments are used to manage this disease.

=== Fungicides ===
Seed treatments: carboxin, fenpiclonil, tebuconazole, triadimenol, triticonazole.
