= Aizoago =

Scientific classification
- Domain: Eukaryota
- Kingdom: Fungi
- Division: Basidiomycota
- Class: Ustilaginomycetes
- Order: Ustilaginales
- Family: Ustilaginaceae
- Genus: Aizoago; Vánky (2013)

Type species
- Aizoago tetragoniae Vánky & R.G.Shivas (2013)

Species
- A. tetragoniae A. tetragonioides

Genus of fungi

Aizoago is a fungal genus in the family Ustilaginaceae. Circumscribed in 2013, it contains two species of smut fungi found in Australia. Aizoago tetragoniae grows on Tetragonia diptera, while A. tetragonioides grows on Tetragonia tetragonioides.
