= Cranberry wild rice bread =

Type of American rice bread

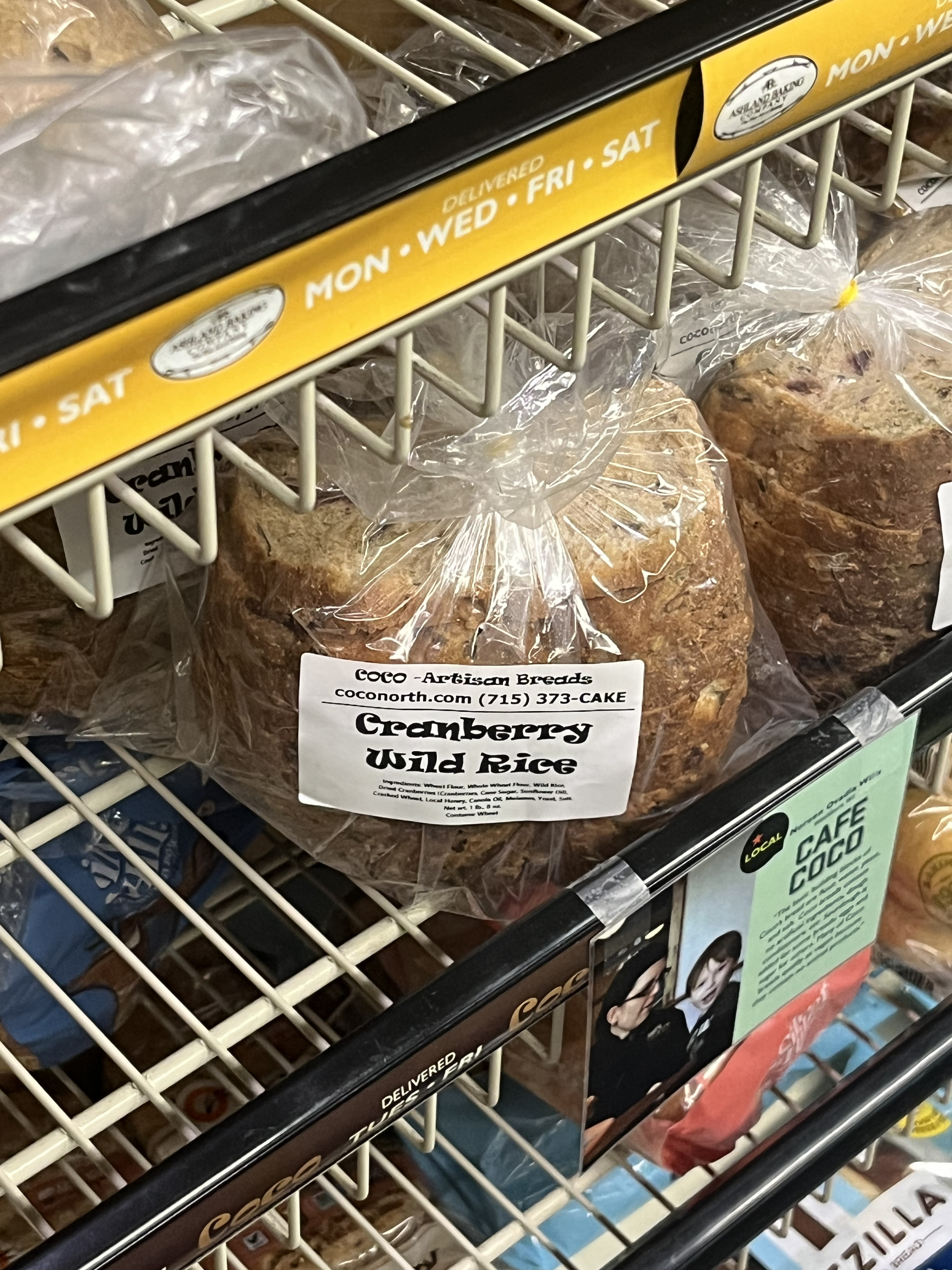
Loaf of cranberry wild rice bread in Duluth, Minnesota, US

Cranberry wild rice bread, also known as wild rice cranberry bread, is a type of rice bread loaf or roll with dried cranberries and wild rice mixed in. It also contains some sugar but is not a sweetbread. The origin of the dish is unknown but it was likely invented in Northern Minnesota, or Madeline Island, Wisconsin.

It can be found throughout Minnesota, as well as some parts of Wisconsin, where it is common to find cranberry wild rice bread at grocery stores, restaurants, and delis. It is likely popular in these states due to the large cranberry industry in Wisconsin and the wild rice industry in Minnesota.
