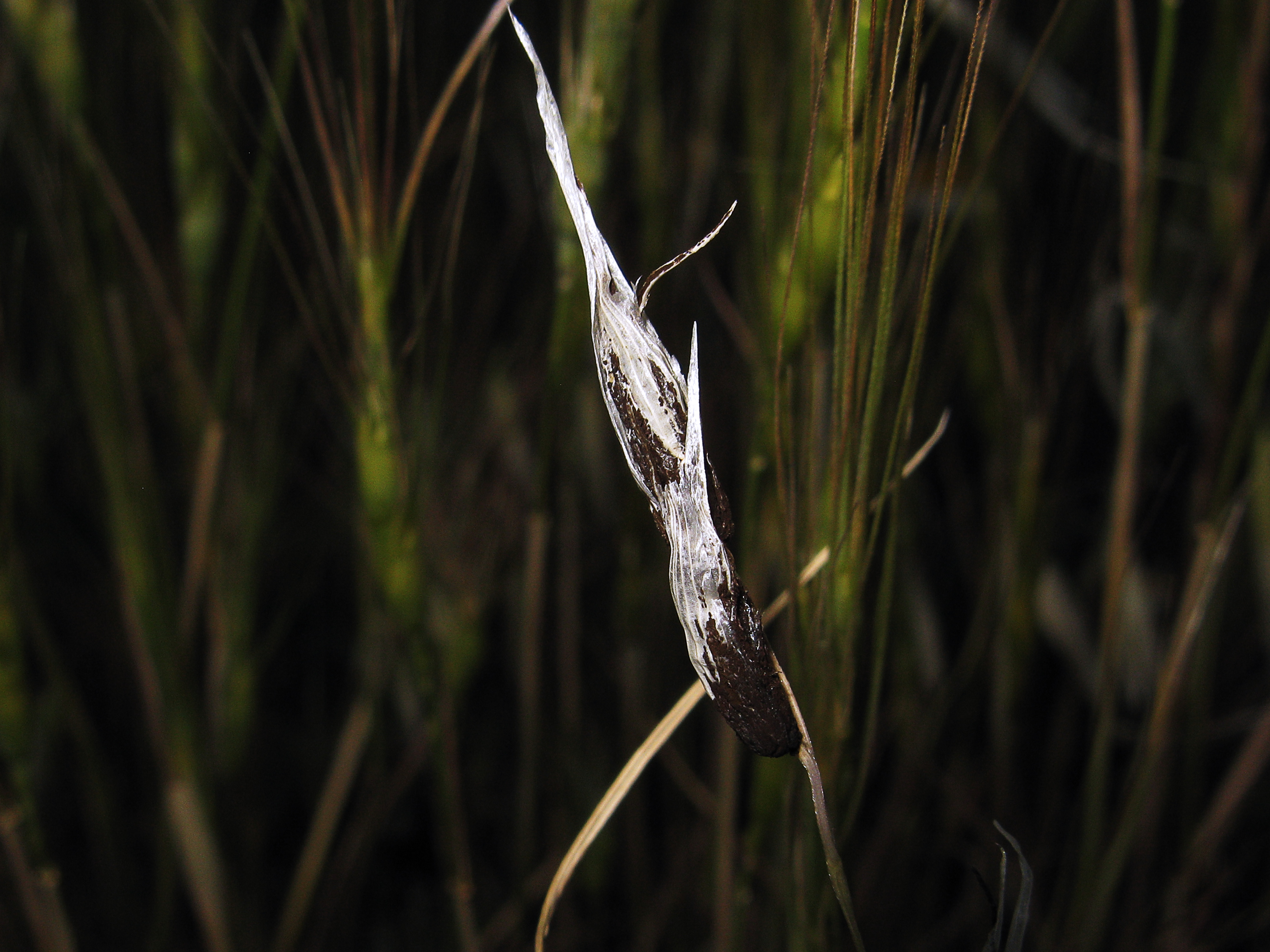

Scientific classification
- Kingdom: Fungi
- Division: Basidiomycota
- Class: Ustilaginomycetes
- Order: Ustilaginales
- Family: Ustilaginaceae
- Genus: Ustilago
- Species: U. avenae

Binomial name
- Ustilago avenae (Pers.) Rostr., (1890)

Synonyms
- Erysibe vera Uredo avenae Uredo segetum Ustilago avenae var. levis Ustilago holci-avenacei Ustilago hordei f.sp. avenae Ustilago jensenii Ustilago kolleri Ustilago levis Ustilago nigra Ustilago perennans Ustilago rostrupii Ustilago segetum var. avenae

= Ustilago avenae =

Species of fungus

Ustilago avenae is a plant pathogen. Semiloose smut of oats can be found wherever oats are grown, as they are seldom treated with seed treatments. The level of treatment is low because oats command a lower sale price than other cereals and hence it is thought that treatment is uneconomic. Smuts, unlike rusts, infect plants in arid climates, often infecting up to 20% of land and over half of the panicles in each field.

As with wheat and barley the grains of semiloose smut infected oat plants are completely replaced by the smut fungus. It is not evident until heads emerge and is very difficult to distinguish from covered smut.

Like rust fungi, the smut fungus has multiple strains. Treatment may involve resistant varieties and chemical agents.

== Life cycle ==
As for loose smut of wheat and barley; however, the semiloose smut fungus is carried on the seed surface and not inside the embryo of the seed. The pathogen is activated when the infected seed germinates, and it extends toward the growing point of the plant.

Evident from flowering onwards when the plant begins to form the head, the fungus invades all of the young head tissue except for that of the rachis (backbone). Production of plant growth hormones by the fungus results in infected plant heads reaching flowering earlier than healthy heads.

The head produced by the infected plant contains black spore masses in place of the grain. The spores are loosely held and are easily spread by wind onto neighboring healthy plants. Because flowering of infected heads occurs earlier than healthy heads, production and release of spores occurs when the rest of the crop is flowering. Spores are blown by the wind into the flowers of the healthy plants. The spores enter the ovaries and become part of the developing grain. In this way, seed for the following year becomes contaminated.
