= Rice bread =

Food made from rice flour

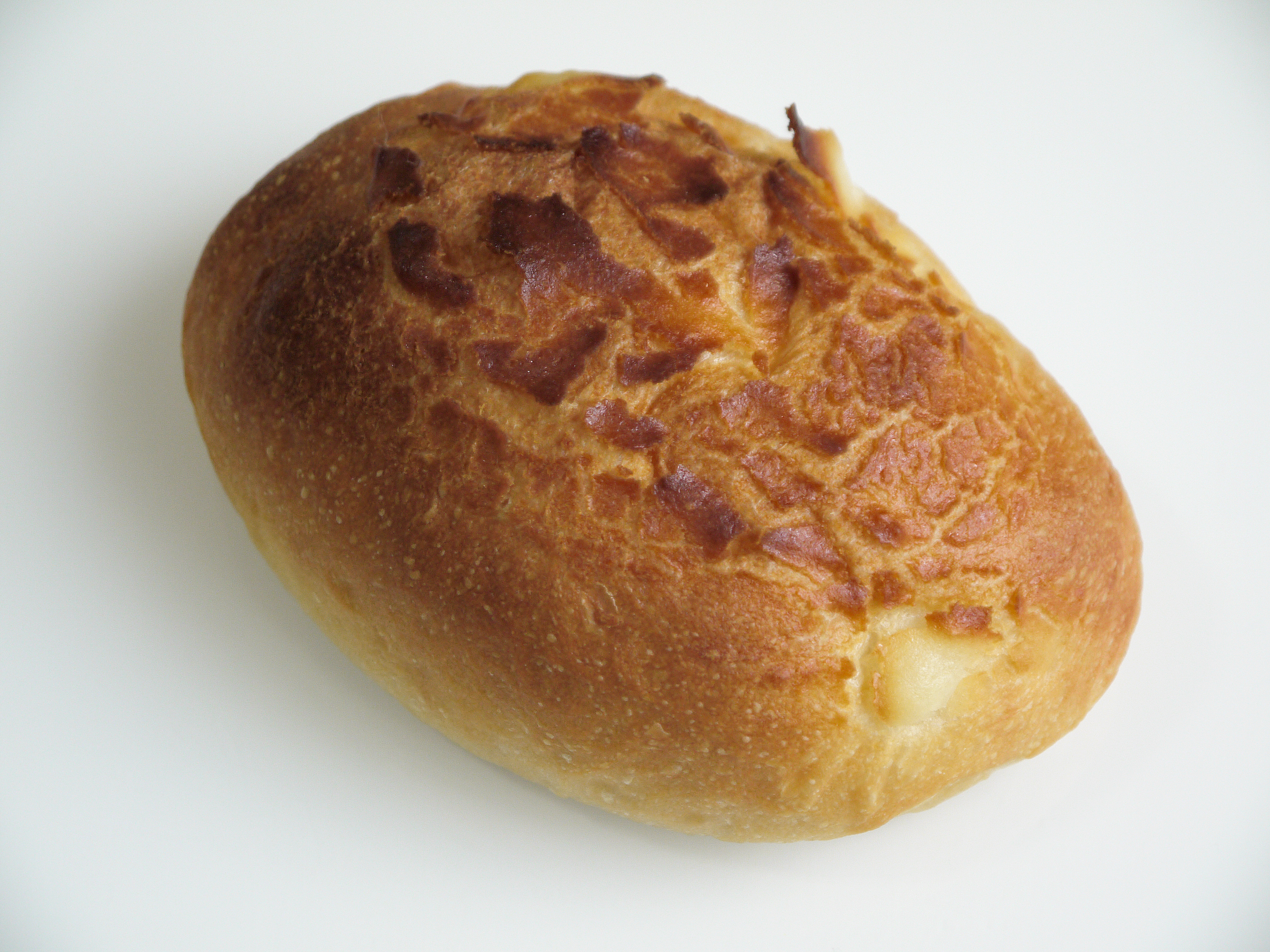
- Rice bread
- Type: Bread
- Main ingredients: Rice flour

Rice bread is a type of bread that is made from rice flour rather than wheat flour. Being gluten free, it will not cause adverse reactions for people with gluten intolerance.

In 2001, a study group at Yamagata University's Department of Engineering used foam molding technology to produce bread made from 100% rice flour.

== Variations ==
The Vietnamese banh mi (baguette) is traditionally made with a mixture of wheat and rice flour, or sometimes exclusively the latter, resulting in an airy, crispy texture.

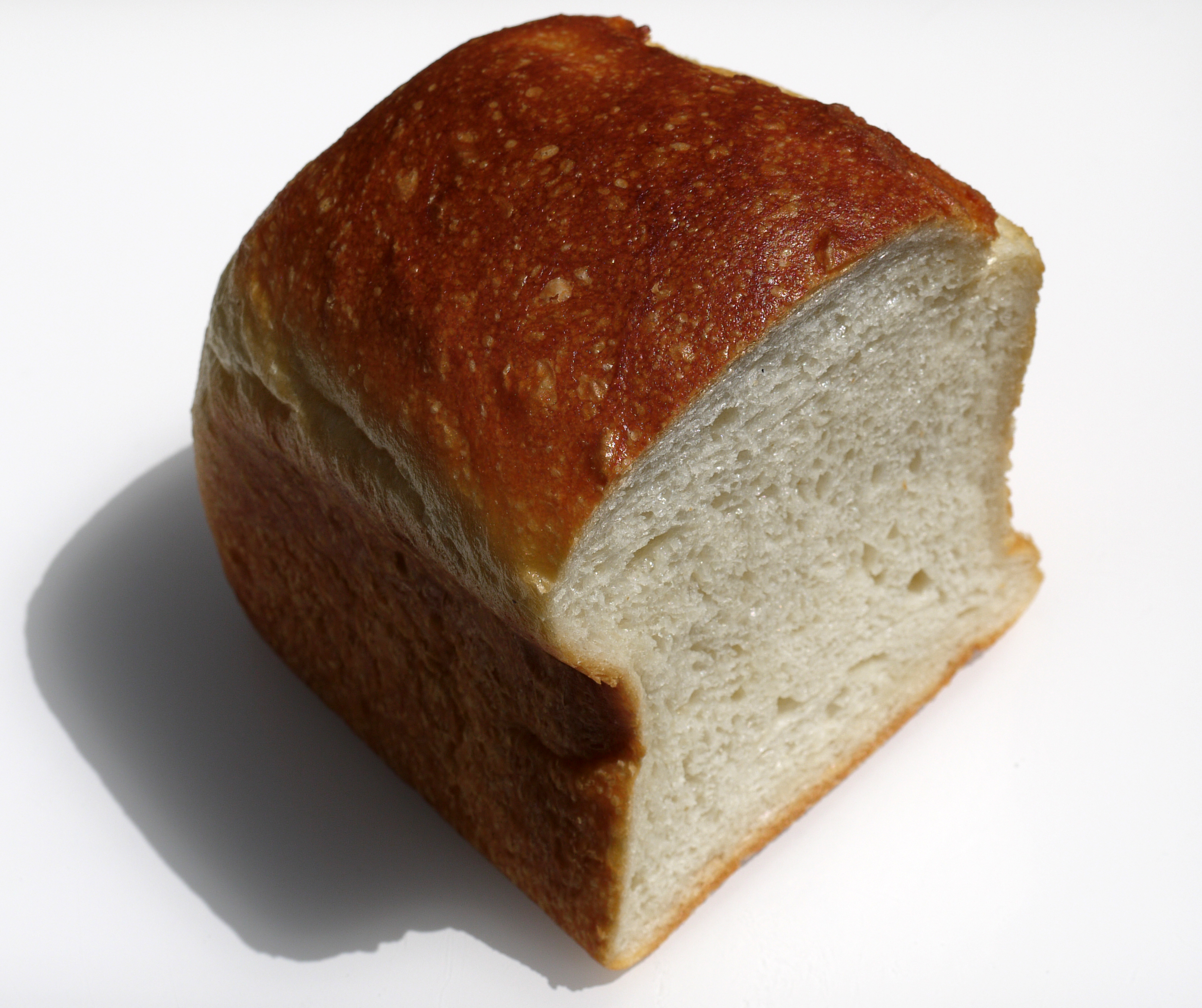
Japanese rice bread

Sierra Leonean and Liberian rice bread is traditionally made with rice flour, mashed ripe plantains, butter, eggs, baking soda, sugar, salt, water, and grated ginger.

Cranberry wild rice bread is a type of rice bread invented in the United States, likely Northern Minnesota, or Madeline Island, Wisconsin. It is made with a mixture of wild rice and dried cranberries.
