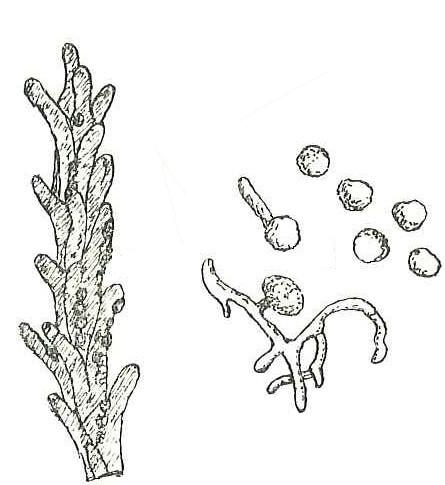

Scientific classification
- Domain: Eukaryota
- Kingdom: Fungi
- Division: Basidiomycota
- Class: Ustilaginomycetes
- Order: Ustilaginales
- Family: Ustilaginaceae
- Genus: Ustilago
- Species: U. tritici

Binomial name
- Ustilago tritici (Pers.) C.N. Jensen, Kellerm. & Swingle

Synonyms
- Uredo tritici Pers. Ustilago segetum var. tritici (Pers.) Brunaud, (18 I j j j78)

= Ustilago tritici =

Species of fungus

Ustilago tritici is a plant pathogen infecting barley; rye and wheat.
