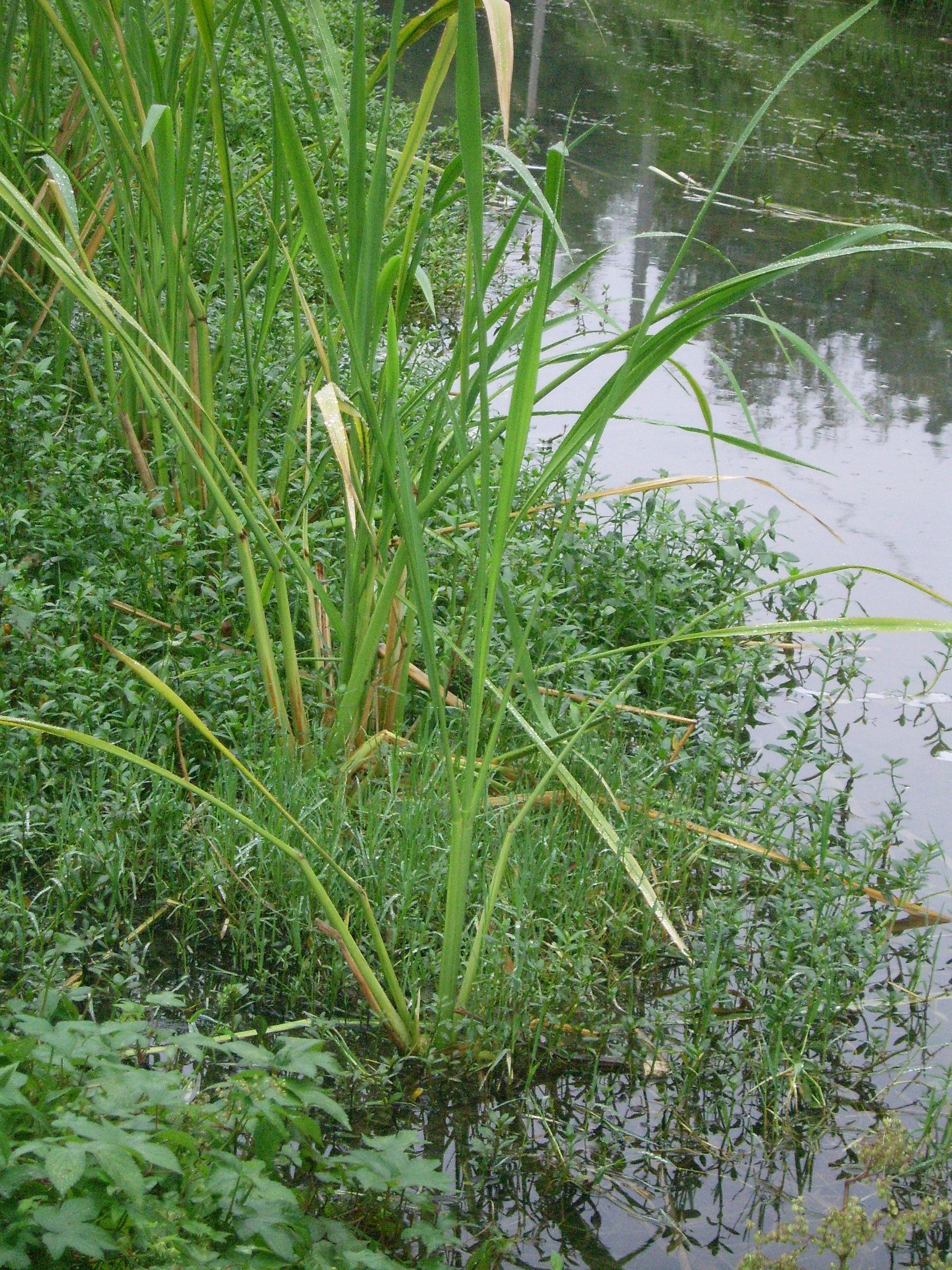

Scientific classification
- Kingdom: Plantae
- Clade: Tracheophytes
- Clade: Angiosperms
- Clade: Monocots
- Clade: Commelinids
- Order: Poales
- Family: Poaceae
- Genus: Zizania
- Species: Z. latifolia

Binomial name
- Zizania latifolia (Griseb.) Hance ex F.Muell.

Synonyms
- Hydropyrum latifolium Griseb.; Limnochloa caduciflora Turcz. ex Trin.; Zizania caduciflora Hand.-Mazz.; Zizania dahurica Turcz. ex Steud.; Zizania latifolia (Griseb.) Turcz. ex Stapf; Zizania latifolia Turcz.; Zizania mezii Prodoehl

= Zizania latifolia =

Species of grass

Zizania latifolia, known as Manchurian wild rice (Chinese: 菰; pinyin: gū or 茭; pinyin: jiāo; POJ: kha; Korean: 줄; RR: jul; Japanese: 真菰 or マコモ makomo), is the only member of the wild rice genus Zizania native to Asia. It is used as a food plant; both the stem and grain are edible. Gathered in the wild wetlands, Manchurian wild rice was an important grain in ancient China. Manchurian wild rice is now very rare in the wild, and its use as a grain has completely disappeared in Asia, though it continues to be cultivated for its smut-swelled stems. A measure of its former popularity is that the surname Jiǎng (simplified Chinese: 蒋; traditional Chinese: 蔣), one of the most common in China, derives from this crop.

== Cultivation ==
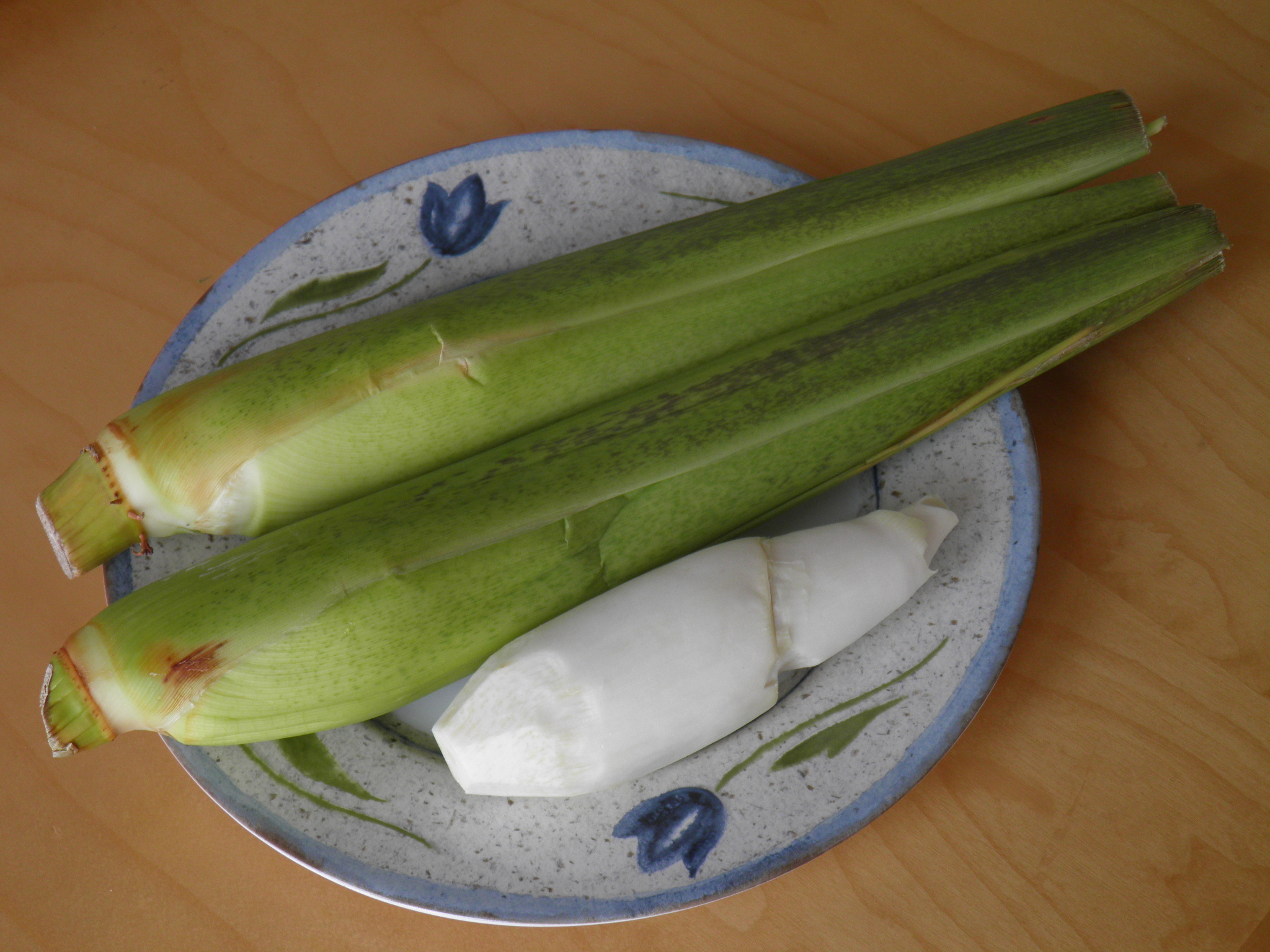
Zizania latifolia stems peeled and unpeeled

=== Smut-infected stems ===
Zizania latifolia is often grown as an agricultural crop across Asia, not for its grain as are other wild rice species, but for the stems which are made hosts of the smut fungus Ustilago esculenta infecting them, swelling in hypertrophy into juicy galls. The galled stems are harvested as a vegetable in China (known as jiāobái(sǔn) (traditional Chinese: 茭白(筍); simplified Chinese: 茭白(笋); Pe̍h-ōe-jī: kha-pe̍h-(sún))) and Japan (真菰筍 makomotake). The galled section of the stem is 3 to 4 centimeters (1.2 to 1.6 in) wide and up to 20 centimeters (10 in) long. This vegetable has been grown for at least 400 years. As the smut infection prevents the plant flowering and setting seed, the crop is propagated asexually by rhizome.

The swollen stems on their own are popular for its flavor and tender texture, and it is eaten raw or cooked. Its taste resembles fresh bamboo shoots. It stays crisp when stir-fried. The main harvesting season is between September and November; a typhoon-occurring season in parts of Asia, a time when many other vegetables are unavailable. This makes the product more attractive to consumers.

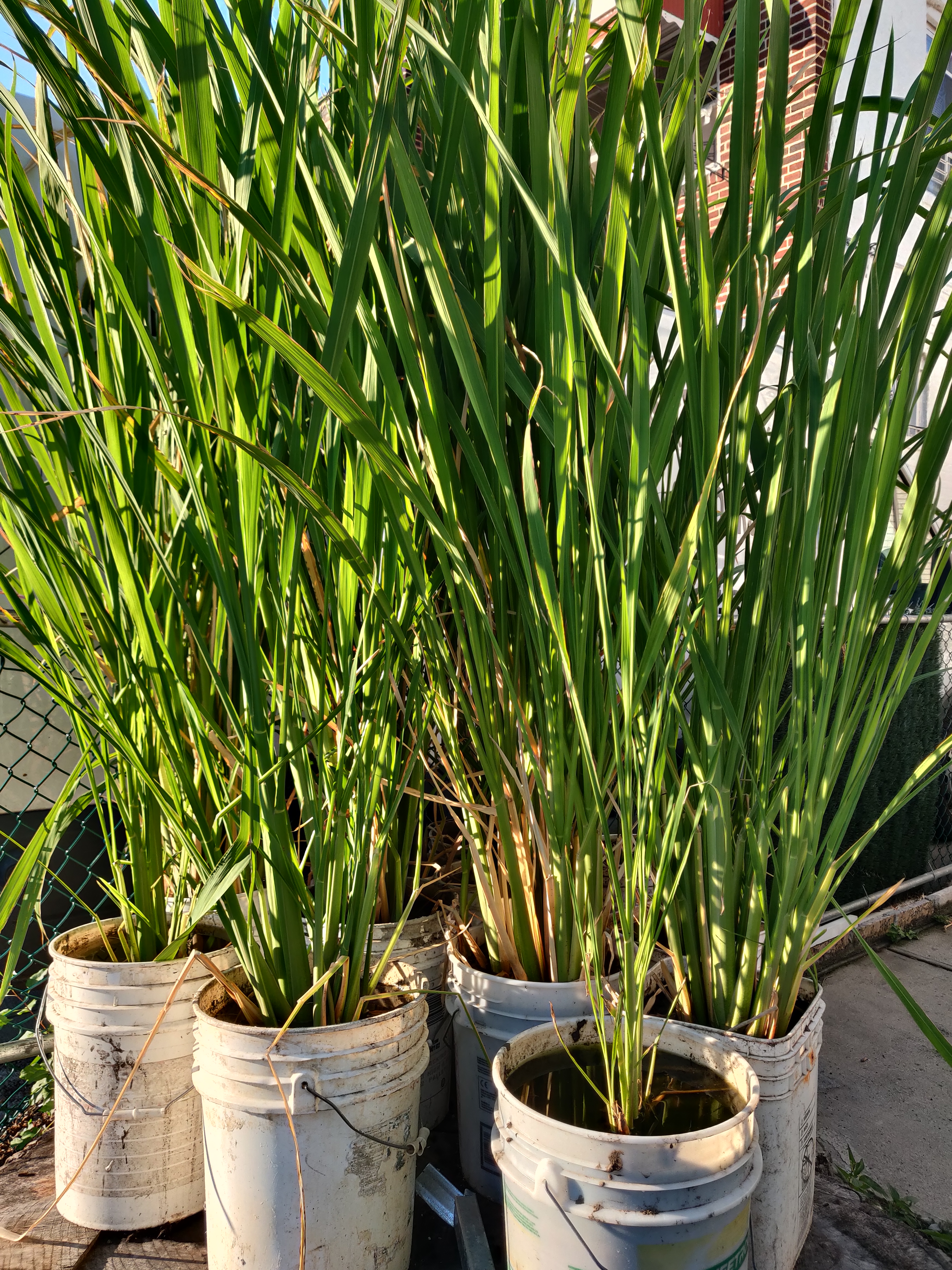
Zizania latifolia in cultivation in Flushing, NY

=== As grain ===
In July 2026, the Chinese Academy of Agricultural Sciences reported on the successful seed harvest of 2 mu worth of the crop. This revived ancient grain is intended to serve as a replacement of imported wild rice from the US and Canada.

== Invasive species ==
It has been accidentally introduced into the wild in New Zealand and is considered an invasive species there. It has been introduced into Hawaii.

Importation of the smut-infected stems to the United States is prohibited in order to protect the North American wild rice species from the fungus.

== Research ==
This wild rice can be crossed with ordinary rice by protoplast fusion. Manual "repeated pollination", a different approach, produces fertile offspring with ~0.1% wild rice DNA.

The genome of the species was initially sequenced in 2015. In 2022, a new sequencing project produced a chromosome-level (2n=2x=34) assembly.
