= Ricing stick =

Agricultural tool

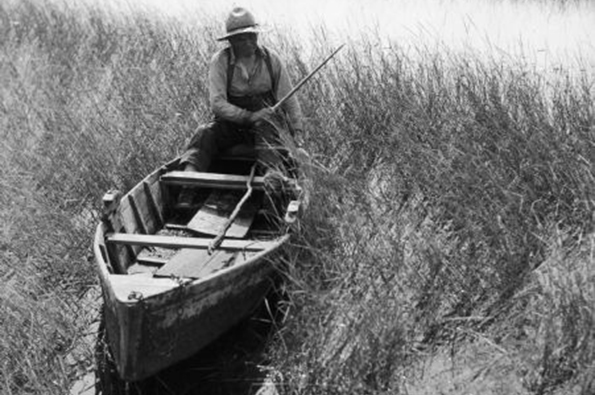
Historical wild rice harvesting by a Chippewa Indian from the Bad River Band of Chippewa Indians, in the Bad River Bend of Lake Superior in Wisconsin.

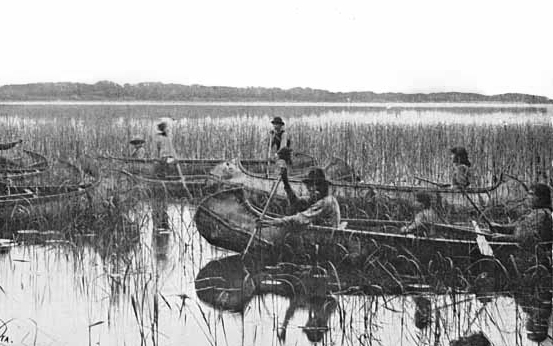
Anishinaabeg harvesting wild rice on a Minnesota lake, c. 1905. The rear seated riders hold ricing sticks in their hands.

A ricing stick (Ojibwe: bawa'iganaak (singular), bawa'iganaakoog (plural)), also known as a flail, knocking stick, or rice knocker, is an agricultural hand tool used for threshing wild rice.

Ricing sticks have been traditionally used by Anishinaabe peoples of the Great Lakes region. The ricing sticks are used to harvest wild-growing rice by knocking the ripened grains off of the stalks of rice. This harvesting is typically performed by canoe—as the plants grow partially submerged in shallow water—and the sticks are used to knock the rice into the canoe or a collection vessel. Any stick can be used, but ricing sticks are normally tapered, blunt sticks, sometimes with a flattened end, with a thicker end, sometimes lined in cloth, meant to be held in the hand. Ricing sticks can be used two at a time, one in each hand, while a companion rows the canoe.

While the tool has ancient roots, it continues to be utilized in modern society, even by non-indigenous people, and use of ricing sticks on public or tribal lands is often regulated. For example, in Minnesota, wild rice on public land can be harvested only using hand-operated ricing sticks which must be "round, smooth wood no longer than 30 inches and weigh no more than one pound." According to the 1854 Treaty Authority Ceded Territory Code, ricing sticks must be “round, smooth cedar, no longer than 32-inch,” while in Wisconsin, they can be up to 38 inches.
