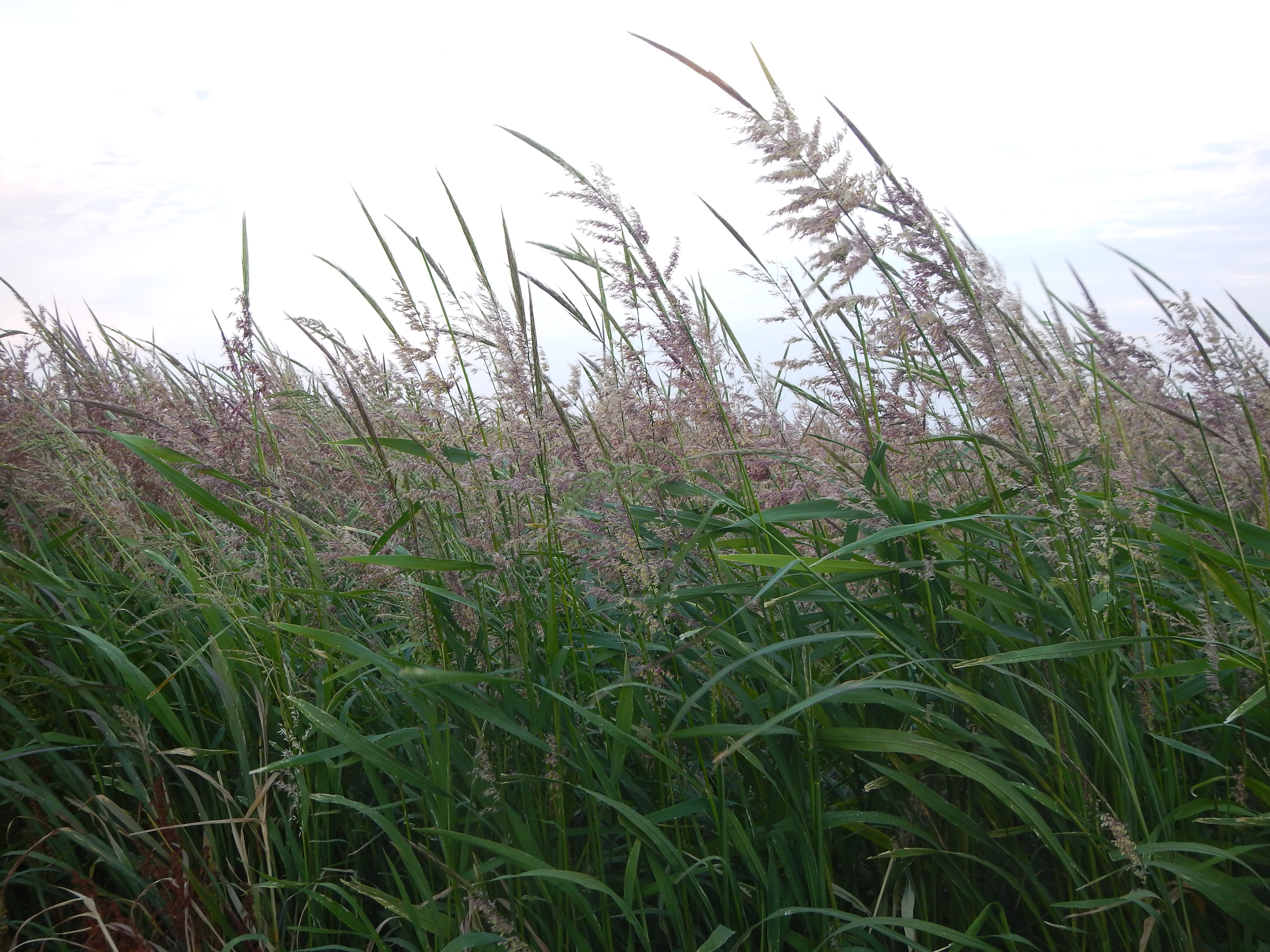
- Zizania palustris

Scientific classification
- Kingdom: Plantae
- Clade: Tracheophytes
- Clade: Angiosperms
- Clade: Monocots
- Clade: Commelinids
- Order: Poales
- Family: Poaceae
- Subfamily: Oryzoideae
- Tribe: Oryzeae
- Subtribe: Zizaniinae
- Genus: Zizania; L.

Species
- Zizania aquatica L.; Zizania aquatica var. aquatica; Zizania aquatica var. brevis Fassett; Zizania latifolia (Griseb.) Turcz. ex Stapf; Zizania palustris L.; Zizania palustris var. interior (Fassett) Dore; Zizania palustris var. palustris; Zizania texana Hitchc.

Synonyms
- Ceratochaete Lunell; Elymus Mitch.; Fartis Adans.; Hydropyrum Link; Melinum Link

= Wild rice =

Genus of plants

Wild rice, also called manoomin, mnomen, psíŋ, Canada rice, Indian rice, or water oats, is any of four species of grasses that form the genus Zizania, and the grain that can be harvested from them. The grain was historically and is still gathered and eaten in North America and, to a lesser extent, China, where the plant's stem is used as a vegetable.

Wild rice and domesticated rice (Oryza sativa and Oryza glaberrima) are in the same botanical tribe Oryzeae. Wild-rice grains have a chewy outer sheath with a tender inner grain that has a slightly vegetal taste.

The plants grow in shallow water in small lakes and slow-flowing streams; Often, only the flowering head of wild rice rises above the water. The grain is eaten by dabbling ducks and other aquatic wildlife.

== Etymology ==
The name manoomin comes from the Ojibwe term ᒪᓅᒥᓐ manoomin meaning 'harvesting grain' (commonly translated 'good grain').

== Species ==
Three species of wild rice are native to North America:

- Northern wild rice (Zizania palustris) is an annual plant native to the Great Lakes region of North America, the aquatic areas of the Boreal Forest regions of Northern Ontario, Alberta, Saskatchewan and Manitoba in Canada and Minnesota, Wisconsin, Michigan and Idaho in the US.
- Southern or annual wild rice (Z. aquatica), also an annual, grows in the Saint Lawrence River, the state of Florida, and on the Atlantic and Gulf coasts of the United States.
- Texas wild rice (Z. texana) is a perennial plant found only in a small area along the San Marcos River in central Texas.

One species is native to Asia:

- Manchurian wild rice (Z. latifolia; incorrect synonym: Z. caduciflora) is a perennial native to China.

Texas wild rice is in danger of extinction due to pollution and loss of suitable habitat in its limited range. The pollen of Texas wild rice can only travel about 30 in (76 cm) away from a parent plant. If a receptive female flower receives no pollen, no seeds are produced. Manchurian wild rice has almost disappeared from the wild in its native range, but has been accidentally introduced into the wild in New Zealand and is considered an invasive species there.

The genomes of northern and Manchurian wild rices have been sequenced. There appears to be a whole genome duplication after the genus split from Oryza.

== Culinary use ==
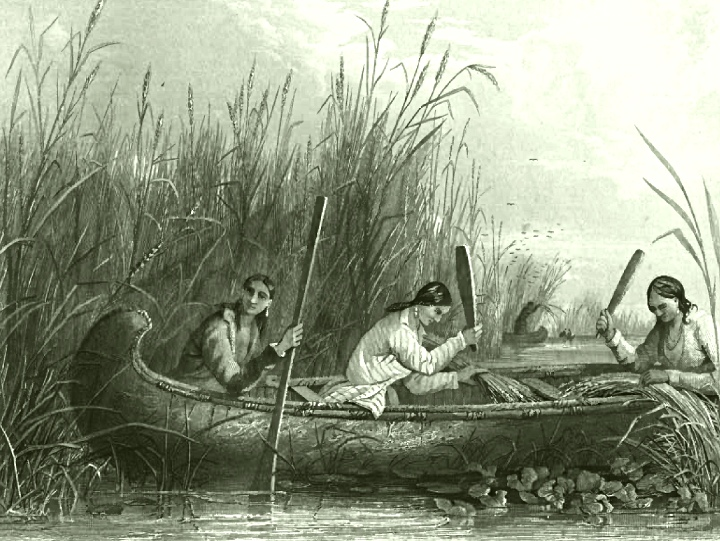
A 19th-century illustration of Native Americans harvesting wild rice

The species most commonly harvested as grain are the annual species: Zizania palustris and Zizania aquatica. The former, though now domesticated and grown commercially, is still often gathered from lakes in the traditional manner, especially by indigenous peoples in North America; the latter was also used extensively in the past. The stems and root shoots also contain an edible portion on the interior.

=== Use by Native Americans ===
Native Americans and others harvest wild rice by canoeing into a stand of plants, and bending the ripe grain heads with two small wooden poles/sticks called "knockers" or "flails", so as to thresh the seeds into the canoe. One person canoes (or "knocks") rice into the canoe while the other paddles slowly or uses a push pole. The plants are not beaten with the knockers, but require only a gentle brushing to dislodge the mature grain. Some seeds fall to the muddy bottom and germinate later in the year. The size of the knockers, as well as other details, are prescribed in state and tribal law. By Minnesota statute, knockers must be at most 1 in (2.5 cm) diameter, 30 in (76 cm) long, and 1 lb (450 g) weight.

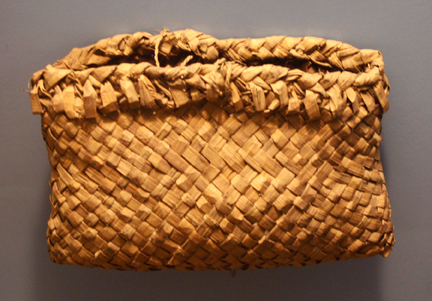
Ojibwa pouch for holding wild rice, cedar bark, American Museum of Natural History

Several Native American cultures, such as the Ojibwe, consider wild rice to be a sacred component of their culture.

In 2018, the White Earth Nation of Ojibwe granted manoomin certain rights (sometimes compared to rights of nature or to granting it legal personhood), including the right to exist and flourish; in August 2021, the Ojibwe filed a lawsuit on behalf of wild rice to stop the Enbridge Line 3 oil sands pipeline, which puts the plant's habitat at risk.

Tribes that are recorded as historically harvesting Zizania aquatica are the Dakota, Menominee, Meskwaki, Ojibwe, Cree, Omaha, Ponca, Thompson, and Ho-Chunk (Winnebago). Native people who utilized Zizania palustris are the Ojibwe, Ottawa/Odawa and Potawatomi. Ways of preparing it varied from stewing the grains with venison stock and/or maple syrup, making it into stuffings for wild birds, or even steaming it into sweets like puffed rice, or rice pudding sweetened with maple syrup. For these groups, the harvest of wild rice is an important cultural (and often economic) event. The Omǣqnomenēwak tribe takes their name, and the name Omanoominii that the neighboring Ojibwa use for them, from this plant. Many places in Illinois, Indiana, Manitoba, Michigan, Minnesota, Ontario, Saskatchewan, and Wisconsin are named after this plant, including Mahnomen, Minnesota, and Menomonie, Wisconsin; many lakes and streams bear the name "Rice", "Wildrice", "Wild Rice", or "Zizania".

=== Commercialisation ===
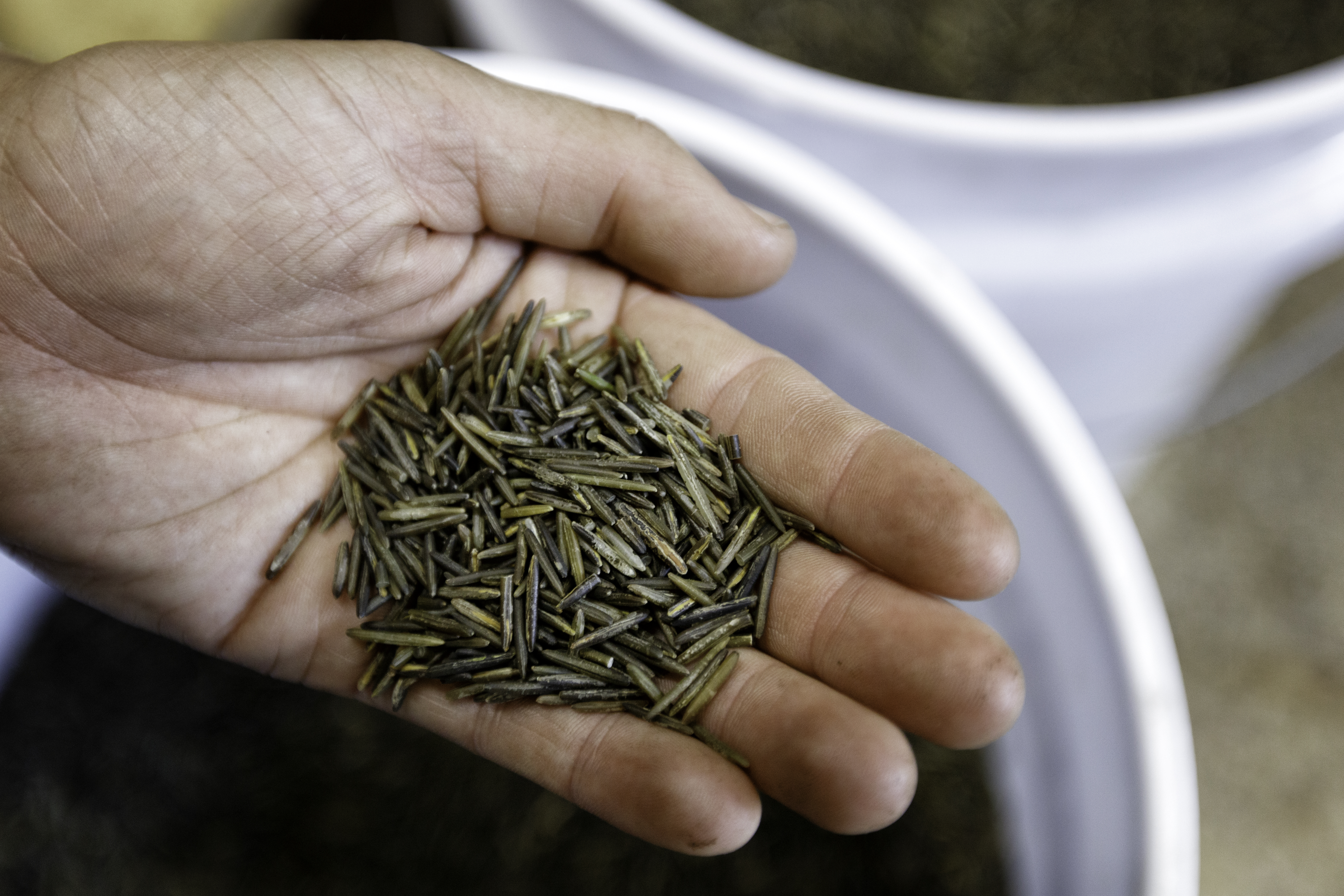
Processed wild rice

Because of its nutritional value and taste, wild rice increased in popularity in the late 20th century, and commercial cultivation began in the U.S. and Canada to supply the increased demand. In 1950, James and Gerald Godward started experimenting with wild rice in a one-acre meadow north of Brainerd, Minnesota. They constructed dikes around the acre, dug ditches for drainage, and put in water controls. In the fall, they tilled the soil. Then, in the spring of 1951, they acquired 50 lb (23 kg) of seed from Wildlife Nurseries Inc. They scattered the seed onto the soil, diked it in, and flooded the paddy. Much to their surprise, since they were told wild rice needs flowing water to grow well, the seeds sprouted and produced a crop. They continued to experiment with wild rice throughout the early 1950s and were the first to officially cultivate the previously wild crop.

In the United States, the main producers are California and Minnesota (where it is the official state grain), and it is mainly cultivated in paddy fields. In Canada, it is usually harvested from natural bodies of water; the largest producer is Saskatchewan. Wild rice is also produced in Hungary and Australia. In Hungary, cultivation started in 1989.

Most commercially available wild rice is not wild-harvested, with approximately half of the wild rice consumed in Canada imported from paddy-growing operations in the US. However, Canadian wild rice production relies on natural harvesting methods, primarily concentrated in northern Manitoba, Saskatchewan, and Northwestern Ontario.

=== Manchurian wild rice ===
Manchurian wild rice (Chinese: 菰; pinyin: gū), gathered from the wild, was once an important grain in ancient China. It is now very rare in the wild, and its use as a grain has completely disappeared in China, though it continues to be cultivated for its stems.

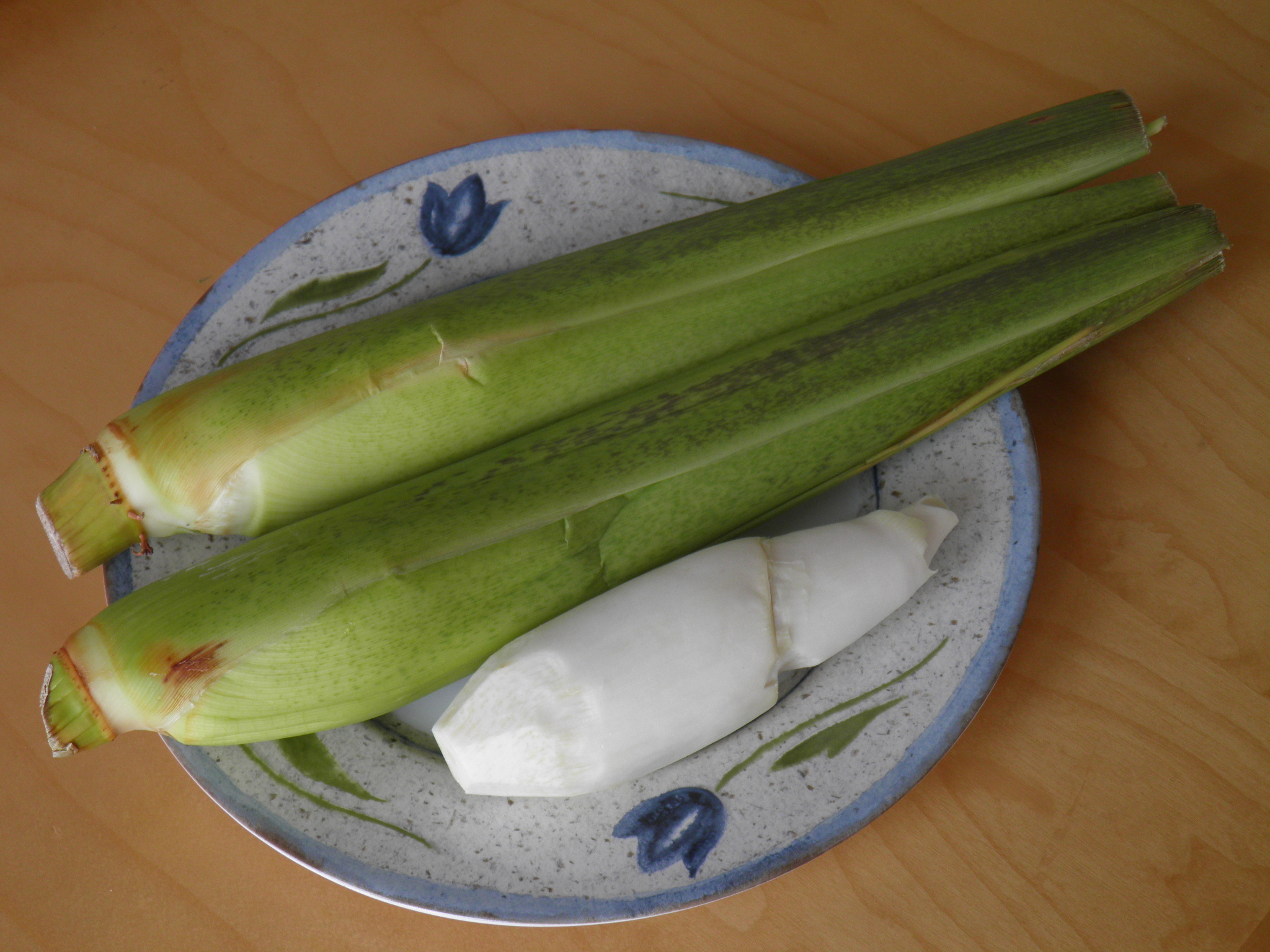
Wild rice stems before and after peeling

The swollen crisp white stems of Manchurian wild rice are grown as a vegetable, popular in East and Southeast Asia. The swelling occurs because of infection with the smut fungus Ustilago esculenta. The fungus prevents the plant from flowering, so the crop is propagated asexually, the infection being passed from mother plant to daughter plant. Harvest must be made between about 120 days and 170 days after planting, after the stem begins to swell, but before the infection reaches its reproductive stage, when the stem will begin to turn black and eventually disintegrate into fungal spores.

The vegetable is especially common in China, where it is known as gāosǔn (高筍) or jiāobái (茭白). In Japan it is known as makomodake (マコモダケ). Other names which may be used in English include coba and water bamboo. Importation of the vegetable to the United States is prohibited in order to protect North American species from the smut fungus.

=== Nutrition ===
Wild rice, cooked
Nutritional value per 100 g (3.5 oz)
- Energy: 423 kJ (101 kcal)
- Carbohydrates: 21.34 g
- Dietary fiber: 1.8 g
- Fat: 0.34 g
- Protein: 3.99 g
Vitamins and minerals
Vitamins	Quantity %DV^{†}
Vitamin A equiv. lutein zeaxanthin	64 μg
Thiamine (B1)	4% 0.052 mg
Riboflavin (B2)	7% 0.087 mg
Niacin (B3)	8% 1.287 mg
Vitamin B6	8% 0.135 mg
Folate (B9)	7% 26 μg
Vitamin C	0% 0 mg
Vitamin E	2% 0.24 mg
Minerals	Quantity %DV^{†}
Calcium	0% 3 mg
Copper	13% 0.121 mg
Iron	3% 0.6 mg
Magnesium	8% 32 mg
Manganese	12% 0.282 mg
Phosphorus	7% 82 mg
Potassium	3% 101 mg
Sodium	0% 3 mg
Zinc	12% 1.34 mg
- Link to USDA Database entry
- ^{†}Percentages estimated using US recommendations for adults, except for potassium, which is estimated based on expert recommendation from the National Academies.

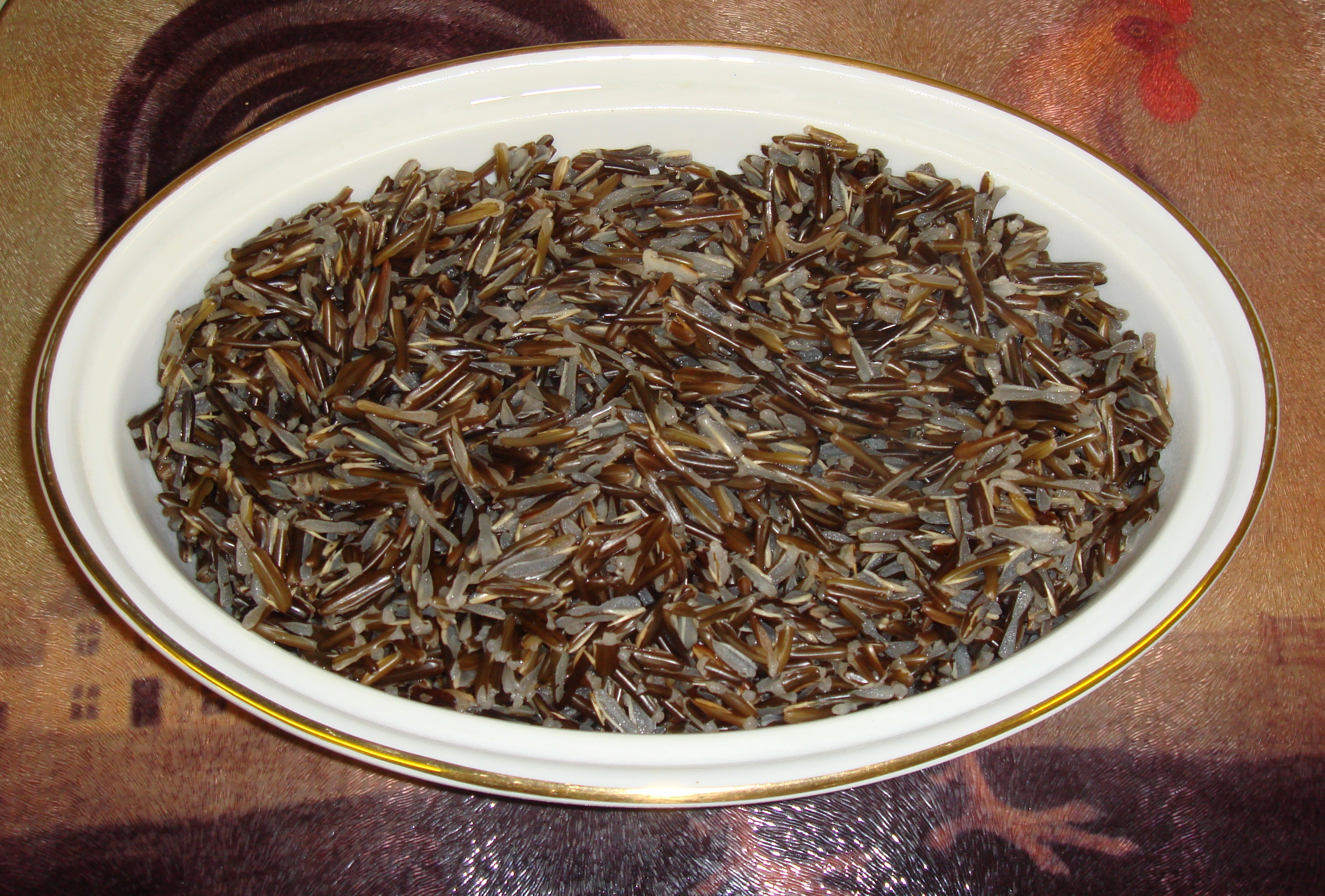
Cooked wild rice

Wild rice is relatively high in protein, the amino acid lysine and dietary fiber, and low in fat. Nutritional analysis shows wild rice to be the grain second only to oats in protein content per 100 calories. Like true rice, it does not contain gluten. It is also a good source of certain minerals and B vitamins. One cup of cooked wild rice provides 5% or more of the daily value of thiamin, riboflavin, iron, and potassium; 10% or more of the daily value of niacin, vitamin B_{6}, folate, magnesium, phosphorus; 15% of zinc; and over 20% of manganese.

=== Dishes in Minnesotan cuisine ===
Wild rice is a common ingredient in Minnesotan cooking, it is a main ingredient in Manoomin porridge, wild rice pancakes, hotdish, wild rice soup, cranberry wild rice bread, and wild rice salad.

=== Safety ===
Wild rice seeds can be infected by the highly toxic fungus ergot, which is dangerous if eaten. Infected grains have pink or purplish blotches or growths of the fungus, from the size of a seed to several times larger.

== Archaeology of wild rice ==
=== Food source ===
Anthropologists since the early 1900s have focused on wild rice as a food source, often with an emphasis on the harvesting of the aquatic plant in the Lake Superior region by the Menominee, Woodland Dakota, and Anishinaabe people, also known as the Chippewa, Ojibwa and Ojibwe. The Smithsonian Institution's Bureau of American Ethnology published The Wild Rice Gatherers in the Upper Great Lakes: A Study in American Primitive Economics by Albert Ernest Jenks in 1901. In addition to his fieldwork interviewing members of various tribal communities, Jenks examined the accounts of explorers, fur traders and government agents from the early 1600s to the late 1800s to detail an "aboriginal economic activity which is absolutely unique, and in which no article is employed not of aboriginal conception and workmanship". His study further notes wild rice's importance in the fur-trading era because the region would have been nearly inaccessible if not for the availability of wild rice and the ability to store it for long periods of time. Wild rice's social and economic importance has continued into present times for the Anishinaabe and other north woods tribal members despite the availability of more easily obtainable food sources.

=== Processing by various cultures ===
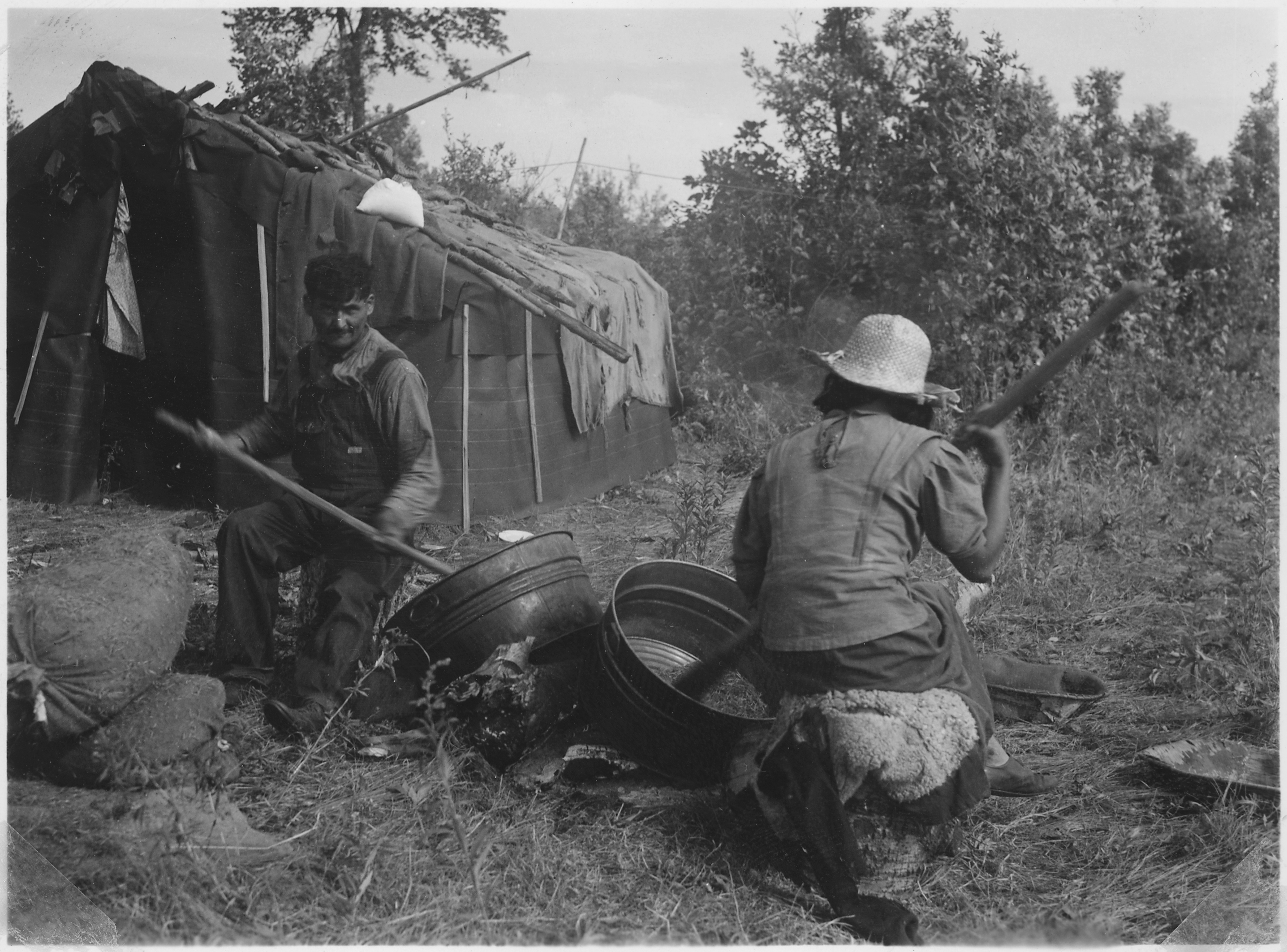
Vintage photo entitled, "Paul Buffalo and wife parching wild rice at their camp" - 1934

The continued use of wild rice from ancient to modern times has provided opportunities to examine the plant's processing by various cultures through the archaeological record they left behind during their occupation of seasonal ricing camps. Early ethnographic reports, tribal accounts and historical writings also inform archaeological research in the human use of wild rice. For example, geographer and ethnologist Henry Schoolcraft in the mid-1800s wrote about depressions in the ground on the shore of a lake with wild rice growing in the water. He wrote that wild rice processors placed animal hides in the holes, filled them with rice and stomped on the rice to thresh it. These jigging pits are part of the husking needed to process wild rice, and archaeologists see these holes in the soil stratigraphy in archaeological excavations today. Such historical records from the post-contact period in the Lake Superior region focus on Anishinaabe harvesting and processing techniques. Archaeological investigations of wild rice processing from the American era, before and after the creation of federal Indian reservations, also provide information on the loss of traditional harvesting areas, as 1800s fur trader and Indian interpreter Benjamin G. Armstrong wrote about outsiders "who claimed to have acquired title to all the swamps and overflowed lakes on the reservations, depriving the Indians of their rice fields, cranberry marshes and hay meadows".

Despite the close association of the Anishinaabe and wild rice today, indigenous use of this food for subsistence also predates their arrival in the Lake Superior region. The Anishinaabe today were part of a larger Algonquian group who left eastern North America on a centuries-long journey to the west along the St. Lawrence River and Great Lakes. The Anishinaabe migration story details a vision to follow a giant clam shell in the sky to a place where the food grows on the water. This journey ended between the late 1400s and early 1600s in the Lake Superior wild rice country when they encountered the plant.

=== Prehistory ===
Archaeological and other scientific investigations have focused on the prehistoric exploitation of wild rice by humans, including:

1. the Menominee, named by the Anishinaabe for their intensive focus on wild rice harvesting,
2. the Anishinaabe,
3. the so-called proto-Anishinaabe, who may have later transformed into this culture from an earlier form,
4. other indigenous groups who exist today, such as the Sioux people, and
5. archaeological-categorized cultures from the Initial and Terminal Woodland periods, whose living lineages today are more difficult to identify.

A seminal 1969 archaeological study indicated the prehistoric nature of indigenous wild rice harvesting and processing through radiocarbon dating, putting to rest the argument made by some European-Americans that wild rice production did not begin until post-contact times. Researchers tested clay linings of thermal features and jigging pits associated with parching and threshing of the plant.

But a more precise dating of the antiquity of human use of wild rice and the appearance of the plant itself in lakes and streams have been the subjects of continuing academic debates. These disputes may be framed around these questions: When did wild rice first appear in various areas of the region? When was it plentiful enough to be harvested in quantities to be a significant food source? What is the relationship of wild rice to the introduction of pottery and to increases in indigenous populations in the past 2,000 years? "The use of wild rice by and its influence on prehistoric people in northeast Minnesota has led to much argument among archaeologists and paleoecologists".

As an example, archaeologists divide human occupation of northeast Minnesota into numerous time periods. They are:

- the Paleo-Indian period from 7,000 years ago (5000 BC) extending back to an uncertain time, after the glaciers receded from the last Ice Age;
- the Archaic period, from 2,500 to 7,000 years ago (5000–500 BC);
- the Initial Woodland period, from 2,500 to 1,300 years ago (500 BC–700 AD);
- the Terminal Woodland period, from 1,300 to 400 years ago (700–1600 AD); and
- the historical period after that time.

These rough dates are open to debate and vary by location in the state. In general, two lines of inquiry have focused on archaeological wild rice:

1. The radiocarbon dating of charred wild rice seeds or the associated charcoal left behind during the parching stage of rice production, and
2. Examination of preserved wild rice seeds associated with specific prehistoric pottery styles found in excavations of processing sites.

Different pottery styles in northern Minnesota are linked to certain times in the Initial and Terminal Woodland periods stretching from around 500 BC to the time of contact between indigenous peoples and Europeans. To place this in context, "Although ceramics may have appeared as early as 2,000 BC in the southeastern United States, it is about 1,500 years later that they became evident in the Midwest". After European contact, indigenous wild rice processors generally abandoned ceramic vessels in favor of metal kettles.

=== Woodland period ===
The Initial Woodland period in northeast Minnesota marks the beginning of the use of pottery and burial mound building in the archaeological record. The Initial Woodland also experienced an increase in indigenous population. One hypothesis is that wild rice as a food source was related to these three developments. An example of a northeast Minnesota wild rice location, the Big Rice site in the Superior National Forest, considered a classic Initial and Terminal Woodland period type site, illustrates the methods of archaeological investigations into the plant's use by humans through time. Archaeological techniques along with ethnographic records and tribal oral testimony, when taken together, suggest use of this particular lakeside site since 50 BCE.

On its own, accelerator mass spectrometry (AMS) radiocarbon dating of wild rice seeds and charcoal samples from the Big Rice itself indicated indigenous use of this site dating to 2,050 years ago. Furthermore, all excavation levels that solely contained ceramics only used during the Initial Woodland period (known as Laurel pottery complex) also included wild rice seeds. This indicated the use of wild rice during the Initial Woodland period, according to the study.

Excavators have documented more than 50,000 pottery shards from the site from the Initial and Terminal Woodland periods. Specifically, researchers analyzed ceramic rimsherds of Laurel pottery from the Initial Woodland period and Blackduck, Sandy Lake and Selkirk pottery styles from the Terminal Woodland period. Each pottery type had wild rice seeds associated with it in the soil layers of archaeological deposits. These soil layers were not contaminated with pottery from other eras.

This suggests intensive exploitation of the site for wild rice processing through these time periods by different cultures. For example, archaeologists often associate Sandy Lake pottery with the Sioux people, who were later displaced by the Anishinaabe and possibly other Algonquian migrants. Archaeologists often associate Selkirk pottery with the Cree people, an Algonquian group.

An examination of the pollen sequence at Big Rice indicates that wild rice existed in "harvestable quantities" 3,600 years ago during the Archaic period. This date is 1,600 years before the AMS radiocarbon date of human-processed charred wild rice seeds at the site during the Initial Woodland period, although there is no archaeological evidence of human use of the wild rice at the site that far back in time as of yet.

== See also ==
- Camargue red rice
- Oryza barthii
