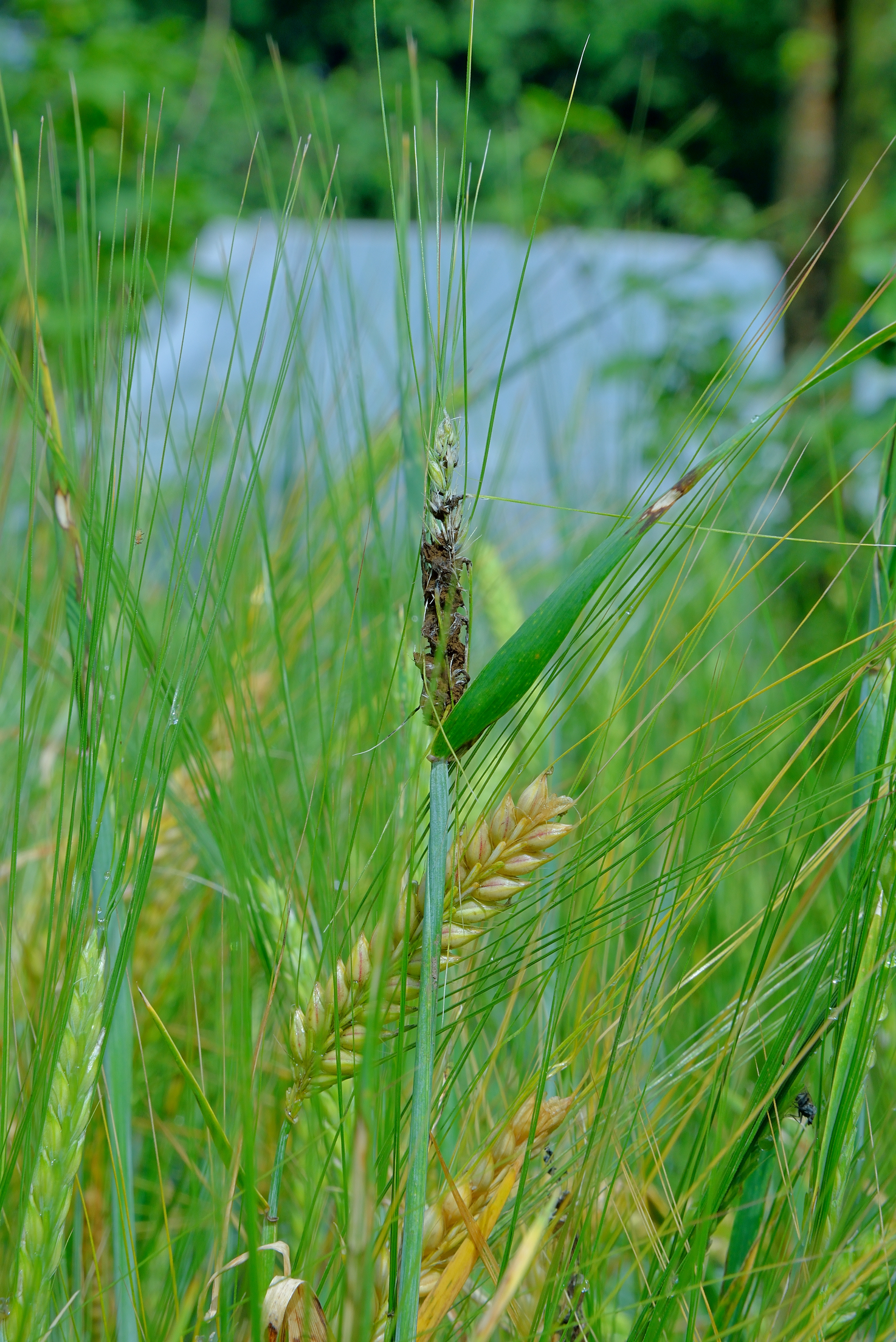

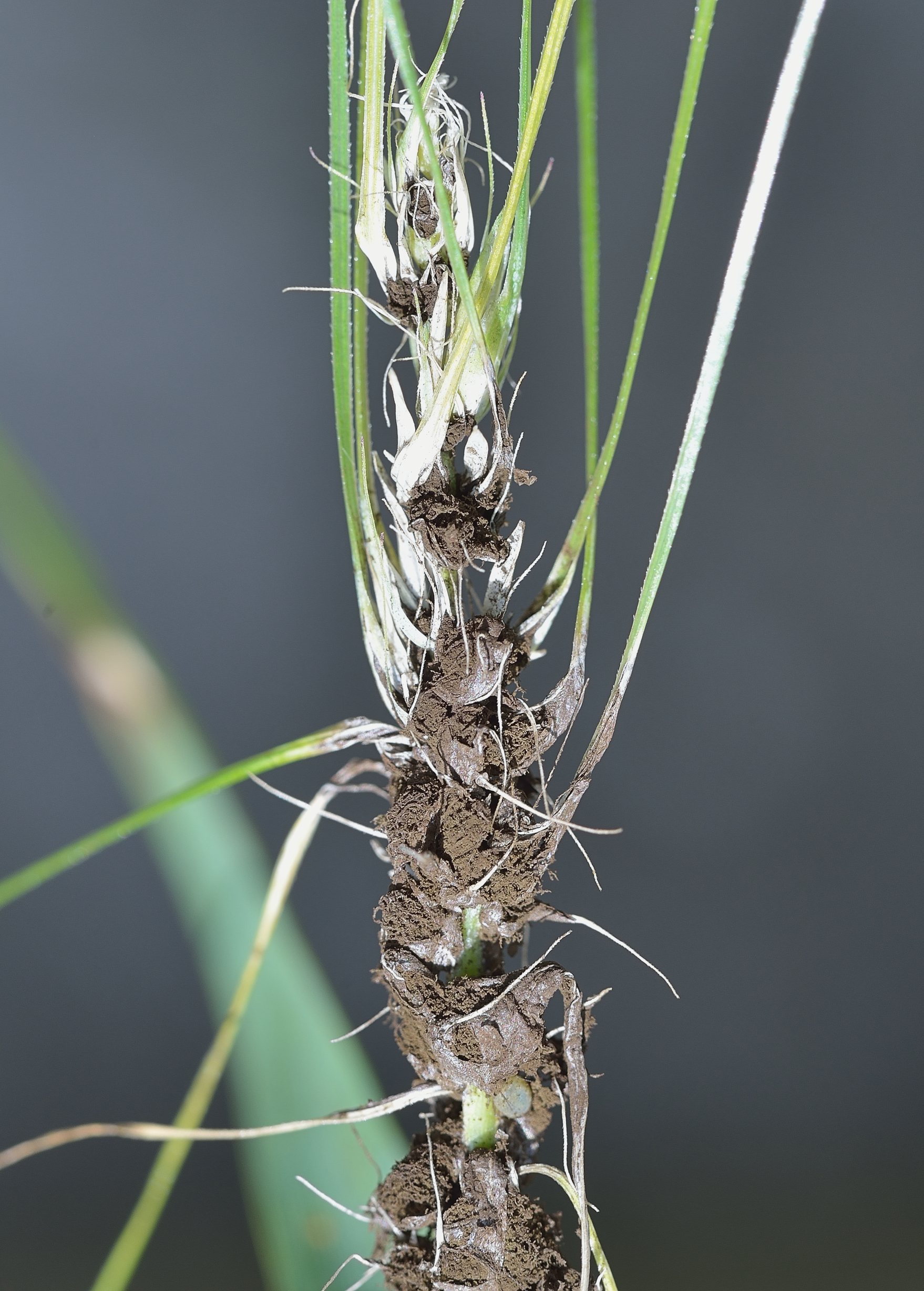

Scientific classification
- Kingdom: Fungi
- Division: Basidiomycota
- Class: Ustilaginomycetes
- Order: Ustilaginales
- Family: Ustilaginaceae
- Genus: Ustilago
- Species: U. nuda

Binomial name
- Ustilago nuda (C.N. Jensen) Rostr. (1889)

= Loose smut =

Fungal disease of barley plants

Loose smut of barley is caused by Ustilago nuda. It is a disease that can destroy a large proportion of a barley crop. Loose smut replaces grain heads with smut, or masses of spores which infect the open flowers of healthy plants and grow into the seed, without showing any symptoms. Seeds appear healthy and only when they reach maturity the following season is it clear that they were infected. Systemic fungicides are the major control method for loose smut.

== Hosts and symptoms ==
The major symptom of loose smut is the "smutted" grain heads, which contain masses of black or brown spores where the grain would normally be. The spores completely replace the grain head so that there is no grain to be harvested on infected plants. It may be possible to identify infected plants in the field before they reach the flowering stage by looking for plants which are taller and more mature than the rest of the field. The fungus causes infected plants to grow slightly taller and mature slightly sooner than the uninfected plants in the field. Since it must infect through the open florets, this gives the fungus a competitive advantage by allowing it to fall down to the healthy plants and ensuring that the fungus has a little extra time to produce and disperse spores before the florets of the healthy plants open.

Ustilago nuda infects barley 'Hordeum vulgare L.' but there are many strains of Ustilago which infect many different cereal crops in a similar manner. Ustilago tritici, for example, is loose smut of wheat.

== Disease cycle ==
The disease cycle of loose smut begins when teliospores are blown to open flowers and infect the ovary either through the stigma or directly through the ovary wall. There are multiple mating types for Ustilago spp. so infection will only occur if two compatible mating types are present in the same flower.

After landing in an open floret, the teliospores give rise to basidiospores. Without dispersing to any alternate host plant, the basidiospores germinate right where they are. The hyphae of two compatible basidiospores then fuse to establish a dikarytic stage.

After germination inside the ovary, the fungal mycelia invade the developing embryo in the seed. The fungus stays alive in the seed until the next growing season, when it is planted along with the seed. As the developing plant grows, the fungus grows with it. Once it's time for the flowers to form, teliospores are produced in place of the flowers and develop where the grain would be.

Plants which are infected with Ustilago spp. actually grow taller and flower earlier than their healthy counterparts. This gives the infected plants an advantage in that the flowers of uninfected plants are more physically and morphologically susceptible to infection. The teliospores in the smutted grain heads disperse to the open flowers of the healthy plants, and the cycle continues.

== Environment ==
Loose smut is unique in that it needs to infect the seed in the previous growing season in order to be a pathogen of the plant in the current growing season. This means that regardless of environmental conditions, if an infected seed is planted as long as the growing conditions are good for the plant, they will be good for the fungus. However, if there are environmental stressors on the plant such as drought or extreme heat, the plant will be more susceptible to injury because of the added stress from the fungal infection. If the plant doesn't survive to its reproductive stage, the fungus will not get to reproduce either.

Environment becomes a factor once teliospores have been produced and are ready for dispersal. In order to get to the open flowers of healthy plants, the teliospores must be moved by wind or rain or possibly insects. If dry, calm conditions persist for the entire time the flowers are open, the infection rate will be low. Wind and moderate rain, as well as cool temperatures (16–22 °C or 61–72 °F) are ideal for the dispersal of spores. Conditions in Eastern Europe, Western Siberia, and the Northern Caucasus regions are some of the most conducive to loose smut.

== Control ==
The most widely used method of control for loose smut is using treated seed. Seeds are typically treated with a systemic fungicide to kill any fungus that may be inside. Since the fungus grows up with the plant, it is very important that the fungicide used to treat the seed be systemic and not just external. The most common type of systemic fungicides used for loose smut are from the carboxin group of chemicals. Although carboxins are highly toxic to fish and mildly toxic to other animals, they degrade rapidly in the environment and since there the fungicide is coated on seed and not sprayed there is not much loss to the environment.

Barley varieties with resistance to loose smut are also commercially available. Although technology is being researched and used to help speed the process of resistant variety development, these traditional breeding methods are still very slow, and it is difficult to develop varieties with resistance which also possess other desirable traits such as those for yield and grain quality. Another option is heat treating the seed to kill the fungus before planting, but this is a delicate process because too much heat will kill the plant embryo and not enough will allow the fungus to survive. Research has also been done to use radio frequency heating to treat seed.

== Importance ==
If uncontrolled, loose smut can wipe out entire crops, since it replaces the grain. In areas where people depend on their grain crops for survival and don't have the money or technology resources to control it, the disease can be devastating. Not only does it wipe out the crop, growers cannot even try again next year since any seeds they were able to harvest will be infected and will not produce seed the following season.

Loose smut has recently become a more serious problem in the Ladakh region in the Himalayan mountains of India. This area has been particularly affected by global climate change and has experienced many new crop pests and diseases because of it. Barley is an important staple crop in this region and although loose smut is not the most prevalent disease of barley in the region, it has the potential to develop into a more serious problem in coming years.

In places like the United States where there are ample resources and technologies such as fungicide seed treatment, loose smut is not an especially important disease.

== Varieties ==
Varieties of Ustilago nuda are:

- Ustilago nuda var. foliicola [Trotter]
- Ustilago nuda var. hordei
- Ustilago nuda var. nuda (C.N. Jensen) Rostr.
- Ustilago nuda var. tritici
