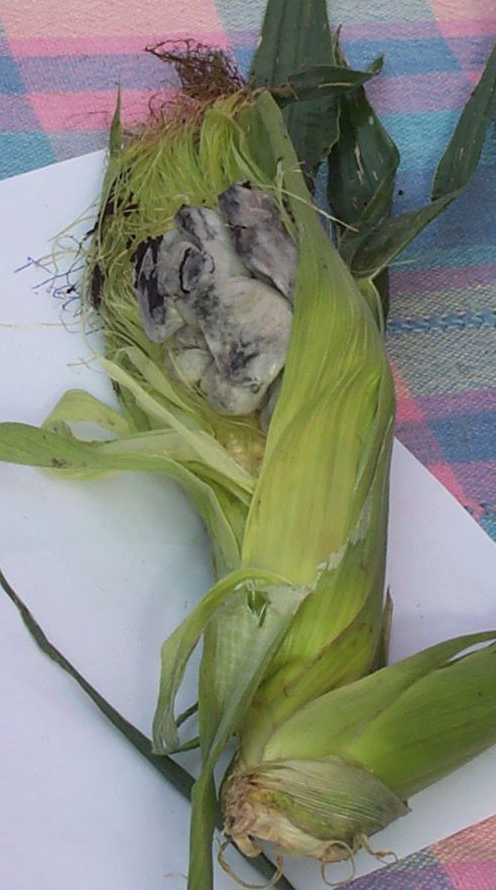
- Ustilago maydis

Scientific classification
- Kingdom: Fungi
- Division: Basidiomycota
- Class: Ustilaginomycetes
- Order: Ustilaginales
- Family: Ustilaginaceae; Tul. & C.Tul. (1847)

Type genus
- Ustilago (Pers.) Roussel (1806)

= Ustilaginaceae =

Family of fungi

The Ustilaginaceae are a family of smut fungi in the order Ustilaginomycetes. Collectively, the family contains 17 genera and 607 species.

== Biotechnological relevance ==
Ustilaginaceae naturally produce a wide range of value-added chemicals (e.g. secondary metabolites, TCA cycle intermediates) with growing biotechnological interest. Reported metabolites are polyols, organic acids, extracellular glycolipids, iron-chelating siderophores and tryptophan derivatives. Polyols, such as erythritol (ery) and mannitol, for example, have large markets as sweeteners for diabetics and as facilitating agents for the transportation of pharmaceuticals in medicine. Itaconic, L-malic, succinic, l-itatartaric, and l-2-hydroxyparaconic acid are organic acids produced by many Ustilaginomycetes. Applications for itaconic acid are for example the production of resins, plastics, adhesives, elastomers, coatings, and nowadays itaconate is discussed as a platform chemical in the production of biofuels. Malic acid is used in many food products, primarily as an acidulant. Succinic acid is utilized as a precursor to pharmaceutical ingredients, such as additives, solvents, and polymers, but also as a food additive and dietary supplement. Another category of metabolites produced by smut fungi contains extracellular glycolipids, such as mannosylerythritol lipids and ustilagic acid. These lipids have biosurfactant properties and can be used in pharmaceutical, cosmetic, and food applications and are known for their strong fungicidal activity on many species.

== Genera ==
With authors and amount of species per genus;

- Ahmadiago Vánky (1)
- Aizoago Vánky (2)
- Anomalomyces Vánky, M. Lutz & R.G. Shivas (2)
- Anthracocystis Bref. (134)
- Bambusiomyces Vánky (1)
- Centrolepidosporium R.G. Shivas & Vánky (1)
- Dirkmeia F.Y. Bai, Q.M. Wang, Begerow & Boekhout (1)
- Eriocaulago Vánky (2)
- Eriomoeszia Vánky (1)
- Eriosporium (E. Müll.) Vánky (2)
- Franzpetrakia Thirum. & Pavgi (3)
- Kalmanozyma Q.M. Wang, F.Y. Bai, Begerow & Boekhout (3)
- Langdonia McTaggart & R.G. Shivas (8)
- Macalpinomyces Langdon & Full. (41)
- Melanopsichium Beck (2)
- Moesziomyces Vánky (7)
- Parvulago R. Bauer, M. Lutz, Piątek, Vánky & Oberw. (1)
- Pattersoniomyces Piątek, M. Lutz & C.A. Rosa (1)
- Shivasia Vánky, M. Lutz & Piątek (1)
- Sporisorium Ehrenb. ex Link (195)
- Stollia McTaggart & R.G. Shivas (5)
- Tranzscheliella Lavrov (17)
- Triodiomyces McTaggart & R.G. Shivas (6)
- Ustilago (Pers.) Roussel (170)
- Yunchangia L. Guo & B. Xu (1)
