= Smut (fungus) =

Reproductive structure of fungi

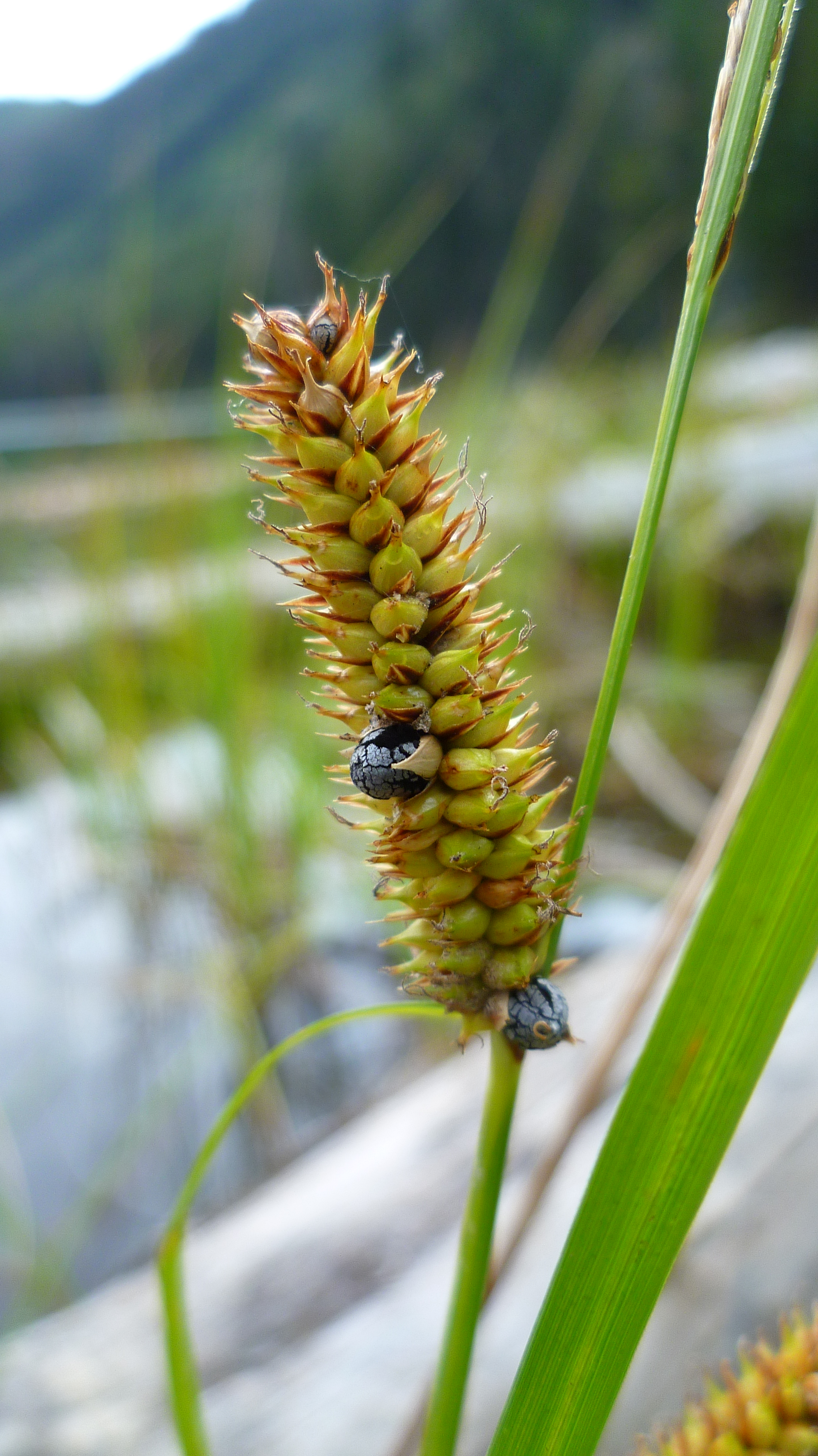
Carex utriculata with smut fungus affecting individual seeds

The smuts are multicellular fungi characterized by their large numbers of teliospores. The smuts get their name from a Germanic word for 'dirt' because of their dark, thick-walled, and dust-like teliospores. They are mostly Ustilaginomycetes (phylum Basidiomycota) and comprise seven of the 15 orders of the subphylum. Most described smuts belong to two orders, Ustilaginales and Tilletiales. The smuts are normally grouped with the other basidiomycetes because of their commonalities concerning sexual reproduction.

== Hosts ==
They can cause plant disease and can infect a broad range of hosts in several monocot and dicot plant families.

Smuts are cereal and crop pathogens that most notably affect members of the grass family (Poaceae) and sedges (Cyperaceae). Economically important hosts include maize, barley, wheat, oats, sugarcane, and forage grasses. They eventually hijack the plants' reproductive systems, forming galls which darken and burst, releasing fungal teliospores which infect other plants nearby. Before infection can occur, the smuts need to undergo a successful mating to form dikaryotic hyphae (two haploid cells fuse to form a dikaryon).

== Wild rice smut ==
Ustilago esculenta is a species of fungus in the Ustilaginaceae, the same genus as those that cause corn smut, loose smut of barley, false loose smut, covered smut of barley, loose smut of oats, and other grass diseases. This smut is only able to grow on Manchurian wild rice (Zizania latifolia, also known as Manchurian ricegrass, Asian wild rice, or wateroat).

Manchurian wild rice is grown as an agricultural crop across Asia – not for its grain, as with other wild rice species, but for the stems. The success of the crop depends on Ustilago esculenta. When the smut invades the host plant it causes hypertrophy – the host's cells increase in size and number. (The fungus also destroys the flowering structures of the plant, so it does not make seed, but the plants can still be propagated asexually by rhizome.) In an environment such as a rice paddy, new sprouts of wild rice are easily infected by spores; the fungus can also be transmitted directly through the rhizome.

The wild rice stems, which grow into juicy galls when infected with the smut, are harvested as a vegetable, known as simplified Chinese: 茭笋; traditional Chinese: 茭筍; pinyin: jiāo sǔn or Chinese: 茭白; pinyin: jiāo bāi in China, and as makomotake in Japan. It is popular for its flavor and texture; the taste resembles fresh bamboo shoots. It can be eaten raw or cooked, and it stays crisp when stir-fried.

== Sugarcane smut ==
Sugarcane smut is caused by the fungus Sporisorium scitamineum, previously known as Ustilago scitaminea. It causes significant losses to the economic value of a sugarcane crop. Sugarcane smut has recently been found in the eastern seaboard areas of Australia, one of the world's highest-yielding sugar areas.

For the sugarcane crop to be infected by the disease, large spore concentrations are needed. The fungus includes a structure known as a 'smut-whip', a curved black structure which emerges from the leaf whorl, which helps to spread the disease to the other plants, usually over a period of about three months. As the inoculum is spread, the younger sugarcane buds just coming out of the soil will be the most susceptible. Water is necessary for the spores to germinate, and irrigation methods have been shown to be a factor in spreading the disease. Therefore, special precautions need to be taken during irrigation to prevent spreading the smut.

Another way to prevent the disease from occurring in the sugarcane is to use fungicide. This can be done by either soaking the sugarcane in fungicide before planting it, or spraying with fungicide after planting. Pre-plant soaking has been proven to give the best results in preventing the disease, but post-plant spraying is a practical option for large sugarcane cultivations.

== Corn smut ==
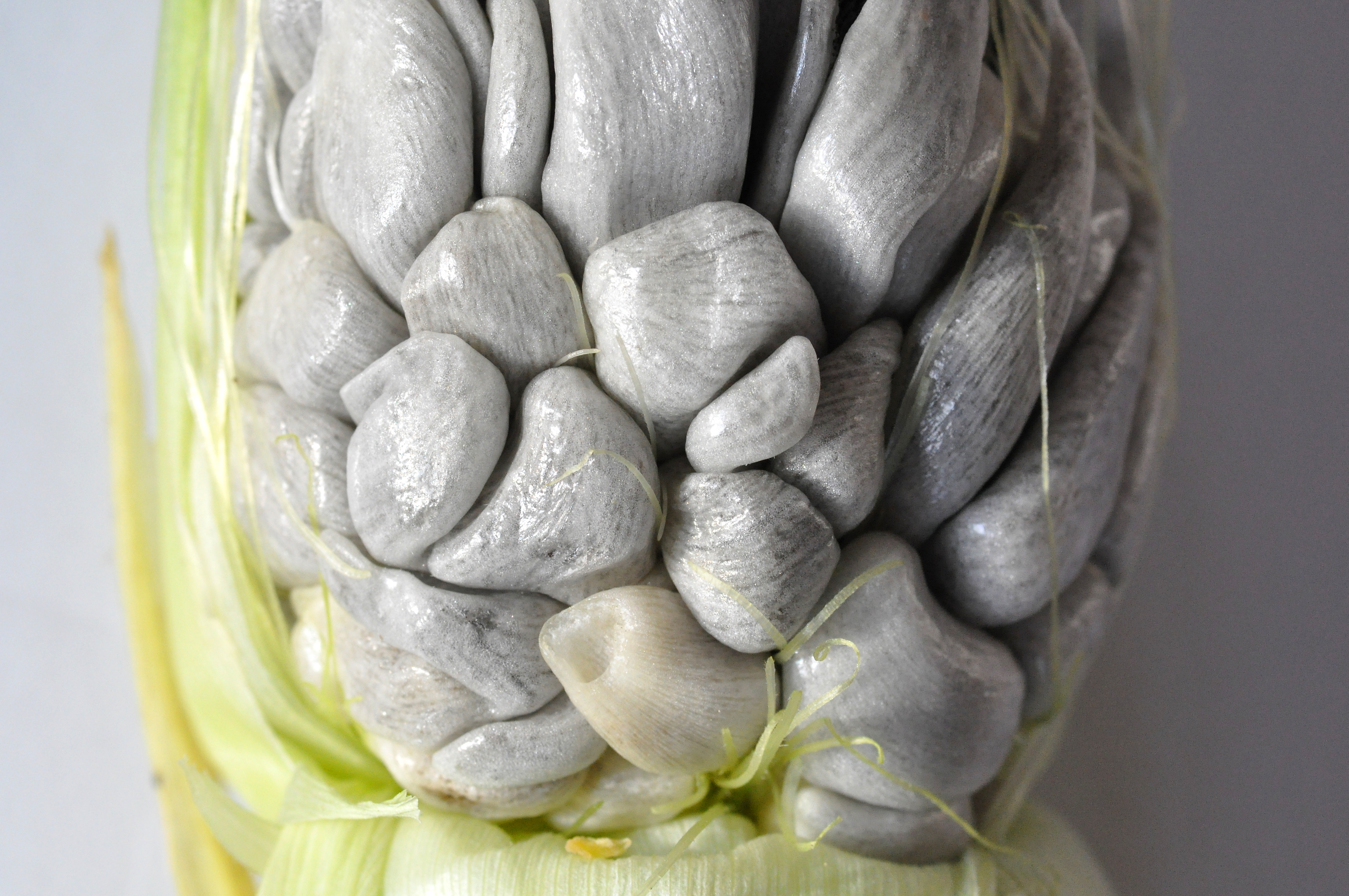
Corn smut

Corn smut (Ustilago maydis) infects maize. It grows in the ears of the crop and converts the kernels into black, powdery fungal tissues. The smut, called huitlacoche by Mexicans and formerly called cuitlacoche by the Aztecs, is a delicacy in Mexico sold in the markets for use in various dishes including soups, stews, steak sauces, and crepes, while in other parts of the world (including the United States) it is not accepted as a food. The amount of protein in corn smut is greater than that which was in the original corn, and also greater than that of oats and clover hay.

== See also ==
- Common bunt Tilletia tritici (syn. T. caries) and T. laevis (syn. T. foetida)
- Ergot, which includes the species Claviceps purpurea
- Loose smut, Ustilago nuda
- Potato smut
- Tilletia controversa (TCK smut)
