= Keeper =

Keeper or Keepers may refer to:

== People and characters ==
=== Persons ===
- Keeper (surname)
- William Keepers Maxwell Jr. (1908–2000), American novelist and editor

=== Roles ===
- Archivist
- Beekeeper
- Gamekeeper
- Gatekeeper
- Greenkeeper
- Keeper of the Privy Purse
- Keeper of the Royal Archives
- Legal guardian
- Lighthouse keeper
- Museum curator
- Prison warden
- Regius Keeper of the Royal Botanic Garden Edinburgh
- Zookeeper

==== Sportspeople ====
- Goalkeeper, a player who protects a goal
- Quarterback keeper, a slang term for a play in American football
- Wicket-keeper, a position in cricket

=== Fictional characters ===
- In the game of Quidditch from Harry Potter, a position that defends the goal hoops
- Keeper (Transformers), a comics character
- Keeper, a space wizard from the TV show Dino Charge
- Keeper, see Drakh, a parasitic creature in the universe of Babylon 5

==== Videogame characters ====
- Keepers are deadly destroyers built by the ancient Progenitors, in the Homeworld 2 videogame,
- Keepers are members of a secret society who are charged with "keeping the balance" of power even within The City, in the Thief (series) videogames
- Keepers (Mass Effect) are a fictional artificial species from the BioWare videogame Mass Effect
- Keepers, an artificial life-forms that protect the Earth in the Nintendo videogame Sin & Punishment: Star Successor
- The Keeper, a playable character in the videogame The Binding of Isaac: Rebirth introduced in the Afterbirth DLC
- Dungeon Keepers (or just Keepers), characters in the Dungeon Keeper series, some of whom are the player characters

== Literature ==
- Keeper: Living with Nancy, a 2009 biographical book by Andrea Gillies
- Keeper (Peet novel), a 2003 sports novel by Mal Peet
- Keeper (Appelt novel), a 2010 novel by Kathi Appelt
- Keepers (novel), a 2005 novel written by Gary A. Braunbeck

== Music ==
- "Keeper", a 2025 song by Giveon from the album Beloved
- "Keeper", a 2012 song by Guy Sebastian from Armageddon
- "Keeper", a 2022 song by Tobi and Manny Brown
- Keepers: Greatest Hits, a Tracy Byrd album
- Keepers (Guy Clark album), 1997
- Keepers, a 1997 album by Merl Saunders

== Film ==
- Keeper (2015 film), a French-language drama film directed by Guillaume Senez
- Keeper (2025 film), an American horror film starring Tatiana Maslany
- Keepers (film), also known as The Vanishing, a 2018 British psychological thriller film starring Gerard Butler
- The Keepers, English title of Head Against the Wall, a 1959 French drama film directed by Georges Franju

== Other ==
- Keeper Hill, an Irish mountain
- "Keepers" (Journeyman), the sixth episode of the first season of the TV show Journeyman
- Keeper (chemistry) a small quantity of solvent added in an evaporative procedure to prevent analyte loss
- Keeper (password manager)
- Magnet keeper
- Menstrual cup
- Strike plate of a door latch
- Keepers: The Key of Life, a 2006 Russian video game
- Keeper (video game), 2025

== See also ==
- Keeping, a surname
- Kept, a reality television series
- Goalkeeper (disambiguation)
- The Keeper (disambiguation), including "The Keepers"
