= Keep (disambiguation) =

A keep is fortified tower in a castle.

Keep, KEEP, or The Keep may also refer to:

== Arts, entertainment, and media ==
- KEEP, a radio station in Texas, U.S.
- The Keep, a fictional location on Arrakis in the 1965 Dune series
- The Keep (Egan novel), a 2006 novel by Jennifer Egan
- The Keep (Happy Rhodes album), 1995
- The Keep (Wilson novel), a 1981 novel by F. Paul Wilson
  - The Keep (comics), a 2006 limited series
  - The Keep (film), a 1983 horror film
    - The Keep (Tangerine Dream album), a 1997 soundtrack album
    - The Keep (board game), a 1983 board game published by Mayfair Games
    - The Keep (Mayfair Games), a 1984 role-playing-game scenario
- The Keep (video game), a 2014 Nintendo 3DS game

== Computing ==
- Google Keep, a note-taking web-service launched in 2013
- Keep (app), a Chinese mobile fitness app launched in 2015
- Keeping Emulation Environments Portable, a European project to preserve access to obsolete file formats

== Other uses ==
- Keep (surname), including a list of people with the name
- The Keep, Brighton, opened 2013, an archive and historical resource centre in East Sussex, England
- The Keep, Dorchester, (c. 1880), a museum and former barracks in Dorset, England
- Keep Cottage, a building in Oberlin, Ohio, U.S.

== See also ==
- Keep case, form of packaging for CDs or DVDs
- Keeper (disambiguation)
- Keepers (disambiguation)
- Keeping
