= Goalie (disambiguation) =

A goalie, goalkeeper or goaltender is a designated player in many sports who is charged with directly preventing the opposing team from scoring by intercepting shots at goal.

Specific goalie positions include:

- Goalie (association football)
- Goalie (handball)
- Goalie (ice hockey)
- Lacrosse:
  - Goalie (box lacrosse)
  - Goalie (field lacrosse)
- Goalie (water polo)

Goalie may also refer to:

- Goalie (comics), a character in the UK comic The Beano
- Goalie (film), a 2019 Canadian film about Terry Sawchuk
- "Goalie Goalie", 2018 football-related song by singers Arash, Nyusha, Pitbull; and record producer Blanco

== See also ==
- Rush goalie, also known as a fly goalie or fly keeper, is a variation of association football in which the role of the goalkeeper is more flexible
- Goalkeeper (disambiguation)
- Rent-a-Goalie, a Canadian comedy television series that aired on Showcase from 2006 to 2008
