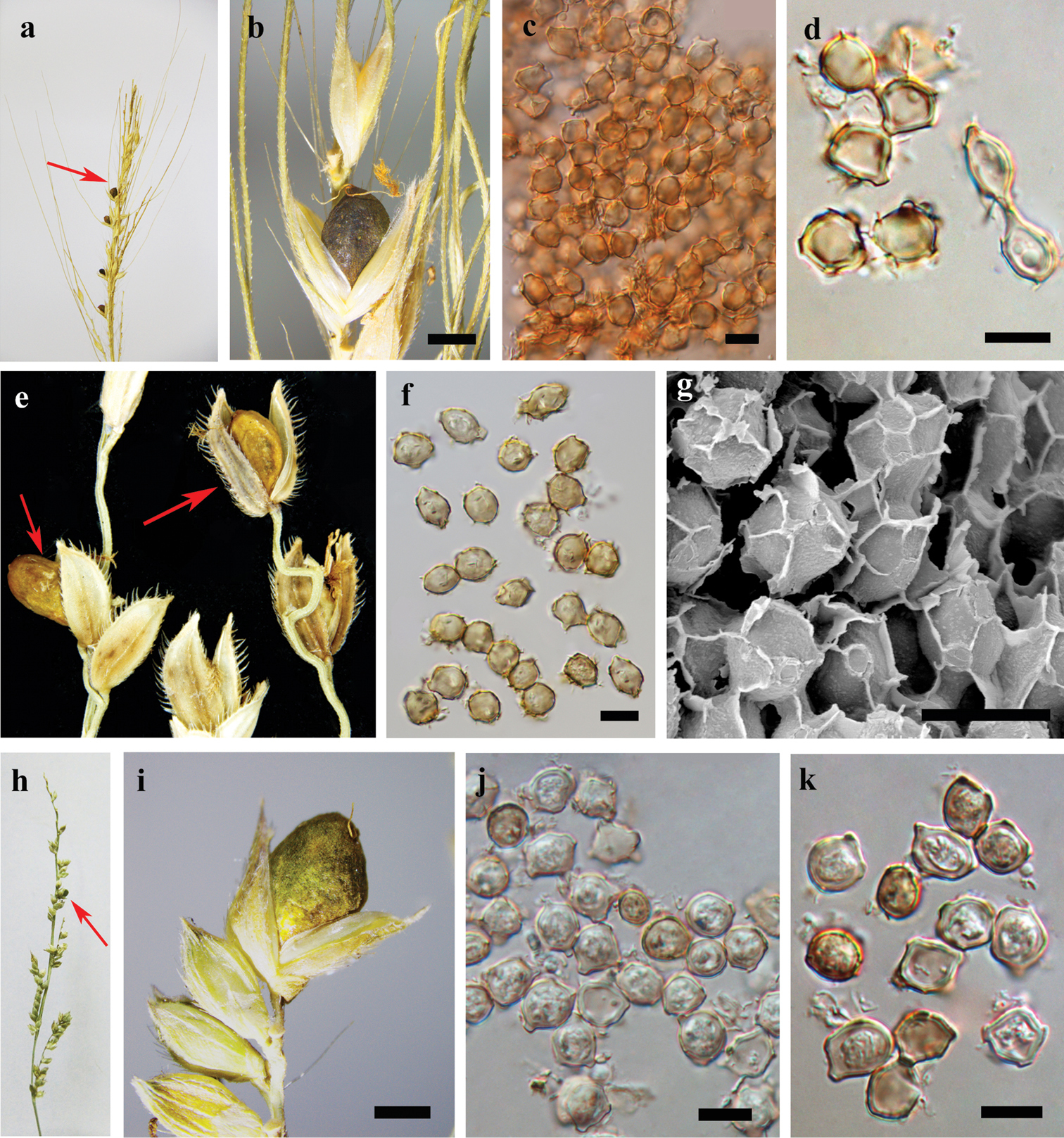
- Various images of Moesziomyces species

Scientific classification
- Kingdom: Fungi
- Division: Basidiomycota
- Class: Ustilaginomycetes
- Order: Ustilaginales
- Family: Ustilaginaceae
- Genus: Moesziomyces; Vánky (2013)

Type species
- Moesziomyces bullatus (J. Schröt.) Vánky, 1977

Synonyms
- Tolypoderma Thirumalachar & M.J.O'Brien, 1978

= Moesziomyces =

Genus of fungi

Moesziomyces is a fungal genus in the family Ustilaginaceae.

They produce sori in the ovaries of grasses, don't have a columella, and have spores with irregular meshes and wings on the surface, bound in firmly agglutinated spore balls. They are Teleomorphs, have a fruiting body.

Moesziomyces spp. are mainly isolated from plant surfaces and provides a natural source of protection against powdery mildews. Several Moesziomyces species have been reported to exhibit biological activity against biodegradable plastics, which are usually used in a number of industrial processes.

Moesziomyces spp. produce a wide range of value-added chemicals (such as secondary metabolites) which contains extracellular glycolipids, such as mannosylerythritol lipids (MEL) and ustilagic acid. These lipids have biosurfactant properties and can be used in pharmaceutical, cosmetic, and food applications and are known for their strong fungicidal activity on many species. These are potentially better than soy bean oils.

Specimens of M. aphidis have been collected from water samples and on Rhizophora mangle leaves along the Perequê-Áçu River, located in São Paulo State, Brazil.

== Problems ==
Moesziomyces aphidis is known to be a fruit pathogen on pears in Japan (Yasuda et al. 2007), but it is now reported as causing fruit stain on grapes (Vitis vinifera) in China. Moesziomyces bullatus has been found on species of Pennisetum typloides infecting the flowers, the stigma and styles. It is found (with other fungal species) in Hausa koko, a Ghanaian fermented cereal porridge. Other species have been found on other plants such as Echinochloa kimberleyensis in Australia (Moesziomyces kimberleyensis). Leersia hexandra (Moesziomyces globuligerus) and Echinochloa crus-galli in China, Moesziomyces antarcticus.

In recent years, more and more human cases infected by plant fungus have been reported. About 16 human infected cases have been documented, caused by 10 kinds of Moesziomyces or Pseudozyma species. These have been reported in places such as the United States, China, Thailand, Brazil, India, France, Argentina, Korea and Nigeria from 2003 to 2015. Most of the cases were shown as fungaemia (yeasts in the blood). Up to 35 cases were recorded in 2022, with 14 cases of newborns.

Moesziomyces spp. are connected with poaceous plants (Grass family), and Moesziomyces bullatus is commonly associated with smut in pearl millet. In Nigeria, it was then linked to sepsis of a female neonate born prematurely in 2015. This is a very rare case.

== Taxonomy ==
The genus name of Moesziomyces is in honour of Gustav von Moesz (1873-1946), who was a Hungarian mycologist and teacher of Phytopathology and Phytogeography. He taught in Brassó and Budapest.

The genus was circumscribed by Kálmán Géza Vánky in Bot. Not. vol.130 on page 133 in 1977.

In a major revision of the Ustilaginomycetes (Wang et al. 2015) several species have been referred to the genus Moesziomyces. Such as Sterigmatomyces aphidis now Moesziomyces aphidis and

== Species ==
As accepted by GBIF;

- Moesziomyces antarcticus (Goto, Sugiy. & Iizuka) Q.M.Wang, Begerow, F.Y.Bai & Boekhout (2015)
- Moesziomyces aphidis (Henninger & Windisch) Q.M.Wang, Begerow, F.Y.Bai & Boekhout (2015)
- Moesziomyces bullatus (J.Schröt.) Vánky (1977)
- Moesziomyces kimberleyensis Y.M.Li, L.Cai & R.G.Shivas (2019)
- Moesziomyces parantarcticus (Sugita, M.Takash., Mekha & Poonwan) Q.M.Wang, Begerow, F.Y.Bai & Boekhout (2015)
- Moesziomyces rugulosus (Traquair, L.A.Shaw & Jarvis) Q.M.Wang, Begerow, F.Y.Bai & Boekhout (2015)
- Moesziomyces verrucosus (J.Schröt.) J.Kruse & Thines (2017)

Former species;

- M. eriocauli (G.P. Clinton) Vánky (1986) = Dermatosorus eriocauli, Anthracoideaceae
- M. evernius (Syd.) Vánky (1977) = Tolyposporium evernium, Anthracoideaceae
- M. globuliger (Berk. & Broome) Vánky (1977) = Tolyposporium globuligerum, Anthracoideaceae
- M. penicillariae (Bref.) Vánky (1977) = Moesziomyces bullatus, Ustilaginaceae

== Other sources ==
- Kruse, J., Doehlemann, G., Kemen, E., and Thines, M. (2017). Asexual and sexual morphs of Moesziomyces revisited. IMA Fungus 8, 117–129
