= Lipozyme =

Industrial enzyme trademark

Lipozyme, a registered trademark of Novo Nordisk A/S Corp., is a class of industrial enzymes, specifically: lipases.

Lipozymes can be differentiated by origin - it can be extracted from Mucor miehei, Thermomyces lanuginosus, Candida antarctica, and others. For industrial purposes, it can be immobilized on macroporous ion-exchange resins. Lipases like Lipozyme and Novozyme (reg.trademark by Novozymes) play a big role in the synthesis of biodiesel. Lipozyme is also offered as a food supplement clad in capsules. It comes in different activities, measured e.g. in IUN/g or KLU/g (IUN = Interesterification Unit, K = Kilo, LU = Lipase unit).
