= Kepe =

Kepe or KEPE can refer to:

- Kibbeh, a Middle Eastern food
- Archaic spelling of keep; see Keep (disambiguation)
- Tel Keppe (also spelled "Tel Kepe"), a town in northern Iraq
- Anna Kepe (born 1977), a director and actress
- John Kepe (c. 1898 – 1952), a South African thief and murderer
- Centre of Planning and Economic Research (abbreviated "KEPE" in Greek), a Greek economic research center

== See also ==
- Małachowo-Kępe, a village in central Poland
