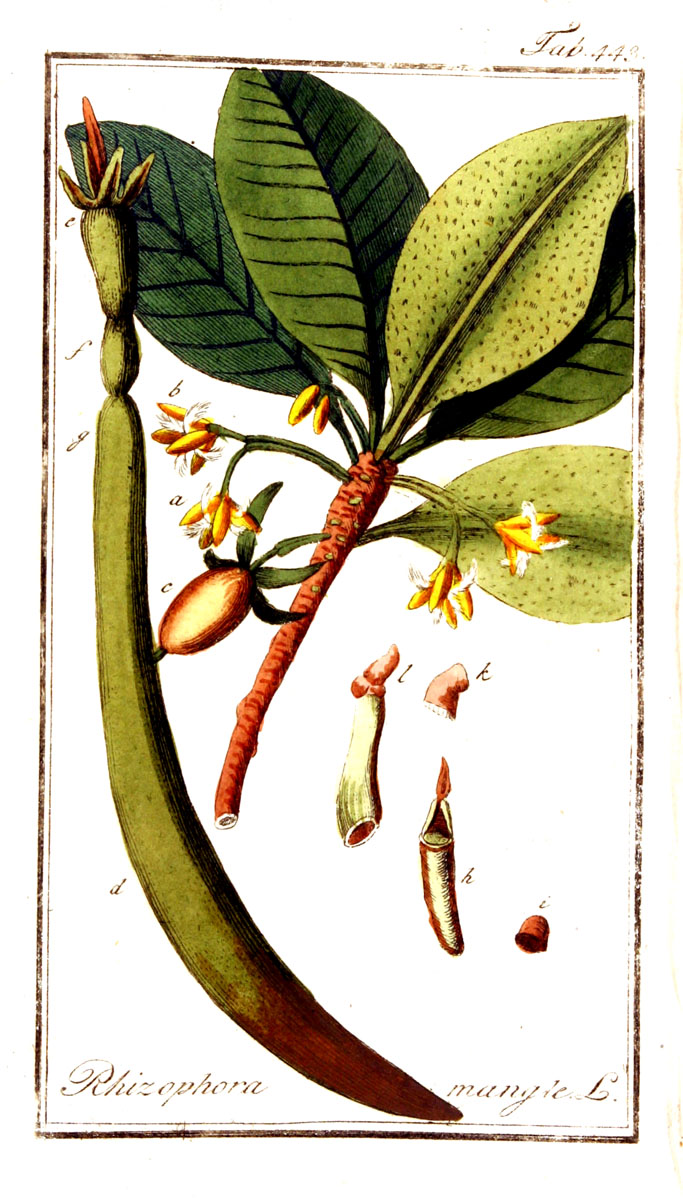
- 1796 Plate by Johannes Zorn

Conservation status
- Least Concern (IUCN 3.1)

Scientific classification
- Kingdom: Plantae
- Clade: Tracheophytes
- Clade: Angiosperms
- Clade: Eudicots
- Clade: Rosids
- Order: Malpighiales
- Family: Rhizophoraceae
- Genus: Rhizophora
- Species: R. mangle

Binomial name
- Rhizophora mangle L.

Synonyms
- Bruguiera decangulata Griff.; Rhizophora americana Nutt.

= Rhizophora mangle =

Red mangrove

Species of flowering plant in the mangrove family

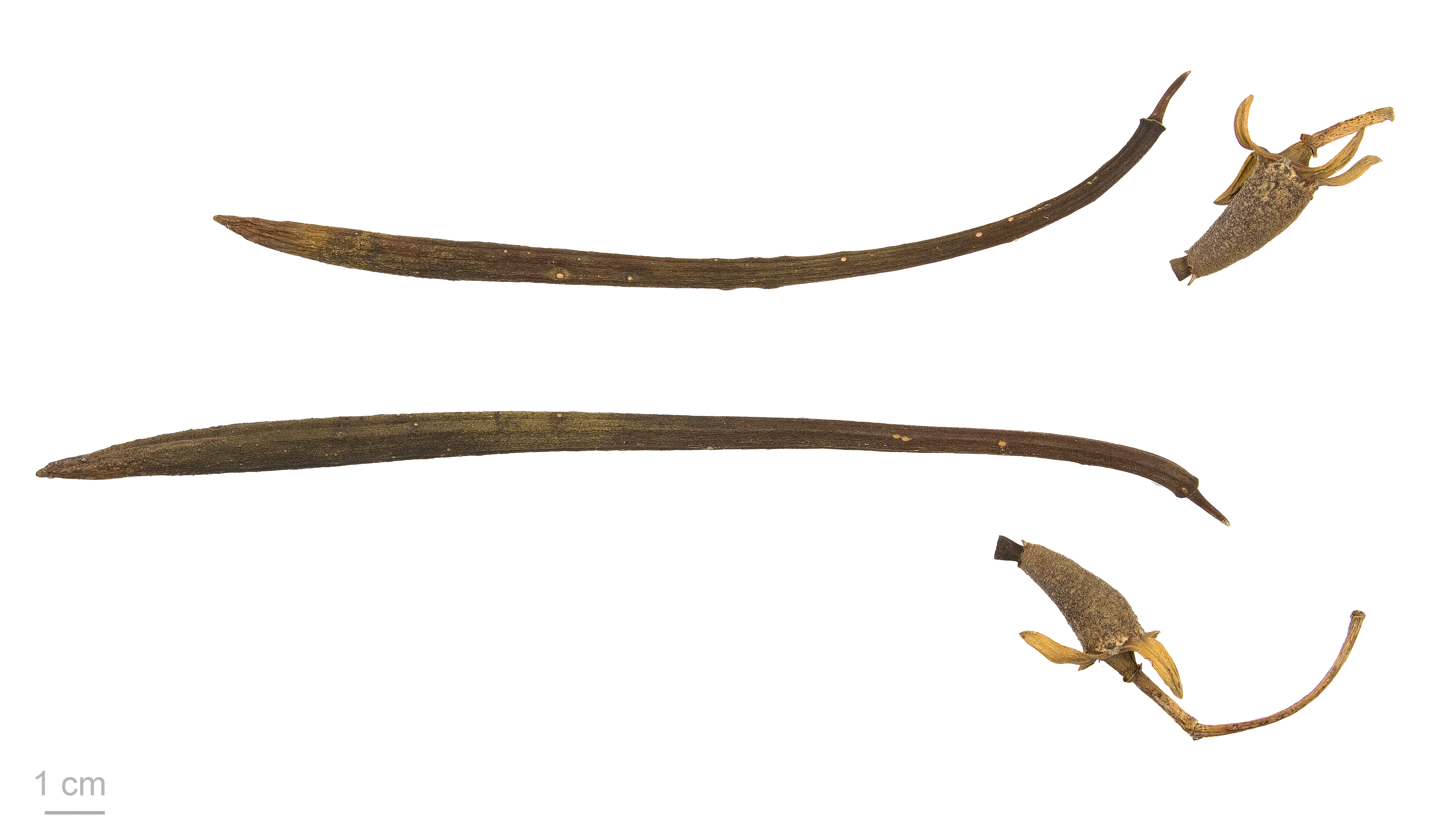
Rhizophora mangle – MHNT

Rhizophora mangle, also known as the red mangrove, is a salt-tolerant, small-to-medium sized evergreen tree restricted to coastal, estuarine ecosystems along the southern portions of North America, the Caribbean as well as Central America and tropical West Africa. Its viviparous "seeds", in actuality called propagules, become fully mature plants before dropping off the parent tree. These are dispersed by water until eventually embedding in the shallows.

Rhizophora mangle grows on aerial prop roots, which arch above the water level, giving stands of this tree the characteristic "mangrove" appearance. It is a valuable plant in Florida, Louisiana, and Texas coastal ecosystems. The name refers to the red colour on the inner part of its roots when halved, so it does not display any red colour in its regular appearance. In its native habitat it is threatened by invasive species such as the Brazilian pepper tree (Schinus terebinthifolia). The red mangrove itself is considered an invasive species in some locations, such as Hawaii, where it forms dense, monospecific thickets. R. mangle thickets, however, provide nesting and hunting habitat for a diverse array of organisms, including fish, birds, and crocodiles.

== Description ==
Red mangroves are easily distinguishable through their unique prop roots system and viviparous seeds. The prop roots of a red mangrove suspend it over the water, thereby giving it extra support and protection. They also help the tree to combat hypoxia by allowing it a direct intake of oxygen through its root structure.

A mangrove can reach up to 80 ft (24 m) in height in ideal conditions, but it is commonly found at a more modest 20 ft (6.1 m). Its bark is thick and a grey-brown color. Mangrove leaves are 1–2 in (2.5–5.1 cm) wide and 3–5 in (7.6–12.7 cm) long, with smooth margins and an elliptical shape. They are a darker shade of green on the tops than on the bottoms. The tree produces yellow flowers in the spring.

== Reproduction ==
As a viviparous plant, R. mangle creates a propagule that is in reality a living tree. Though resembling an elongated seed pod, the fully grown propagule on the mangrove is capable of rooting and producing a new tree. The trees are hermaphrodites, capable of self or wind pollination. The tree undergoes no dormant stage as a seed, but rather progresses to a live plant before leaving its parent tree. A mangrove propagule may float in brackish water for over a year before rooting.

== Distribution and habitat ==
Red mangroves are found in subtropical and tropical areas in both hemispheres, extending to near 28°N to S latitude. They thrive on coastlines in brackish water and in swampy salt marshes. Because they are well adapted to salt water, they thrive where many other plants fail and create their own ecosystems, the mangals. Red mangroves are often found near white mangroves (Laguncularia racemosa), black mangroves (Avicennia germinans), and buttonwood (Conocarpus erectus) though often more seaward than the other species. Through stabilization of their surroundings, mangroves create a community for other plants and animals (such as mangrove crabs). Though rooted in soil, mangrove roots are often submerged in water for several hours or on a permanent basis. The roots are usually sunk in a sand or clay base, which allows for some protection from the waves.

== Ecology ==
Specimens of Moesziomyces aphidis have been collected from water samples and on Rhizophora mangle leaves along the Perequê-Áçu River, in mangroves located in São Paulo State, Brazil.

== Uses ==
In the Casamance region in southern Senegal, halved roots of R. mangle are commonly used to create roof and ceiling structures, as well as for production of firewood and charcoal.

== Gallery ==
A free-standing red mangrove tree growing in shallow water in the backcountry of the Cape Sable area of Everglades National Park

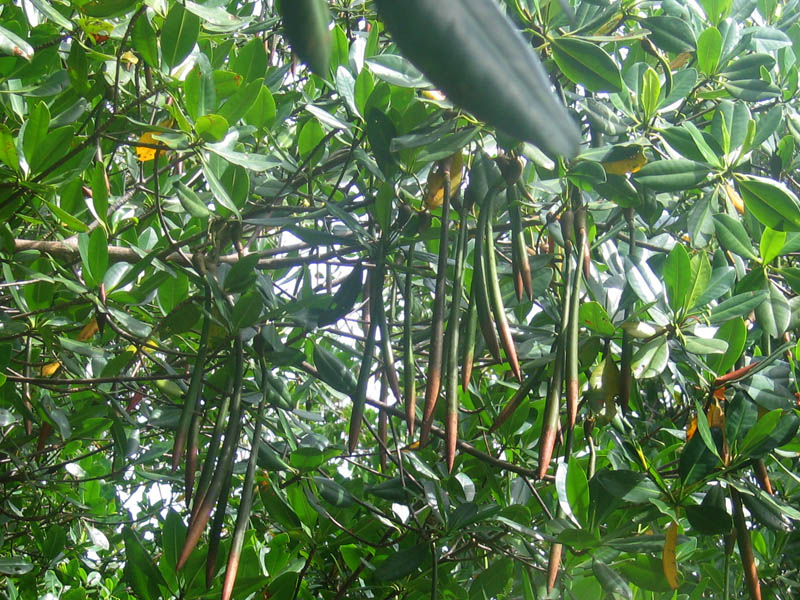
Propagules growing before dropping from the parent plant in the Puerto Mosquito Bio Bay, Vieques

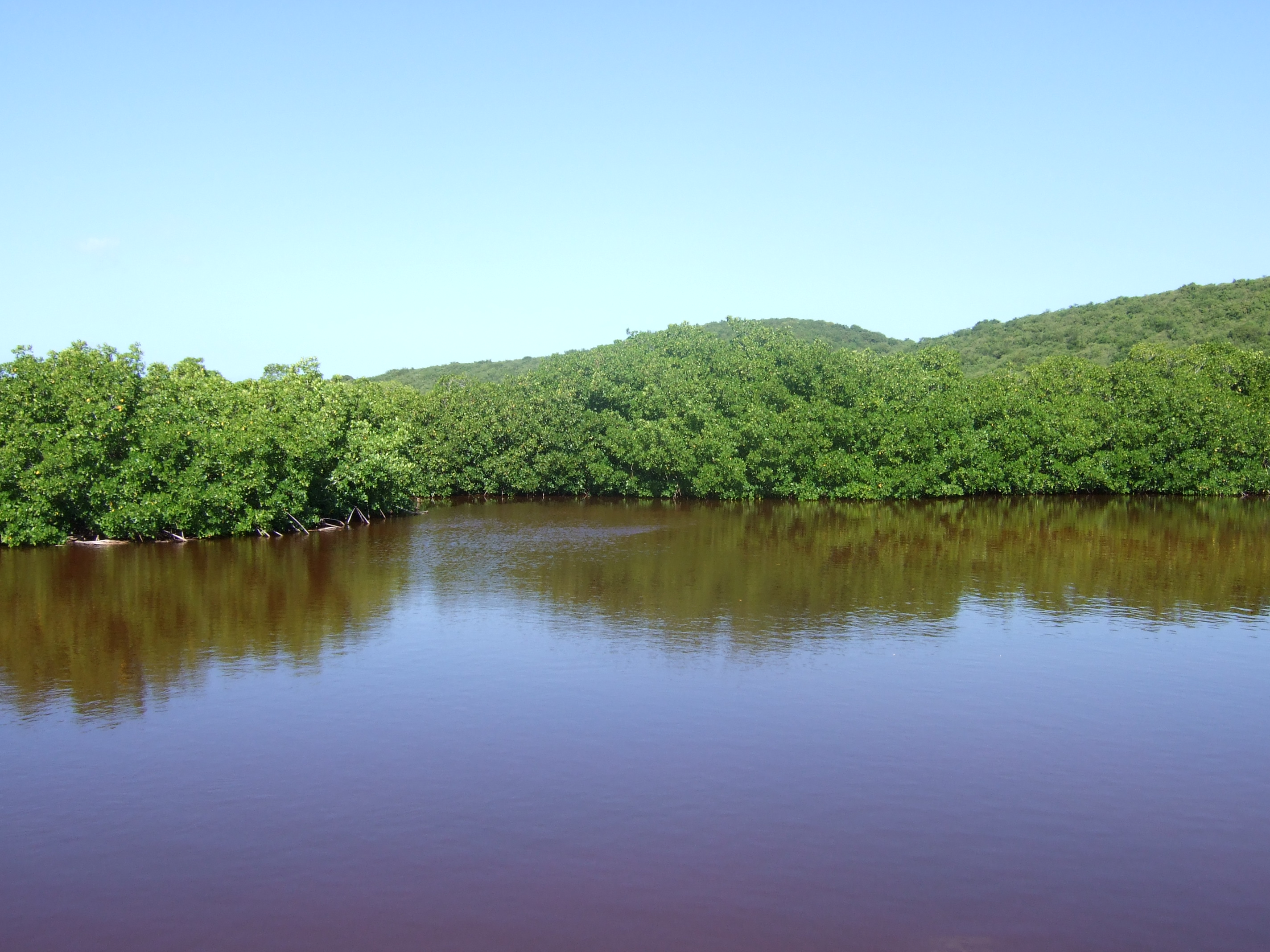
A red mangrove forest in Fajardo, Puerto Rico

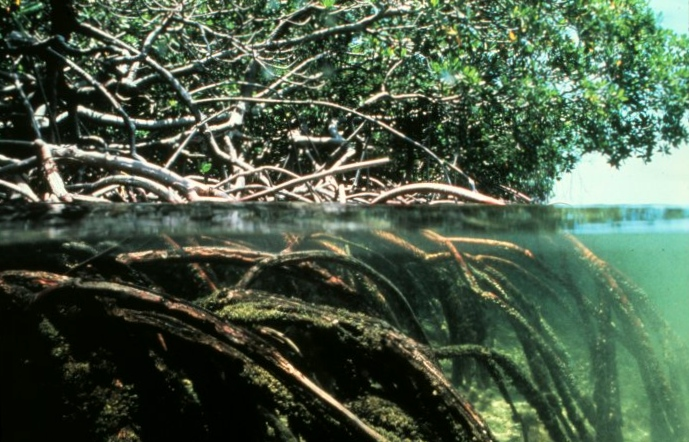
Root structure above and below water

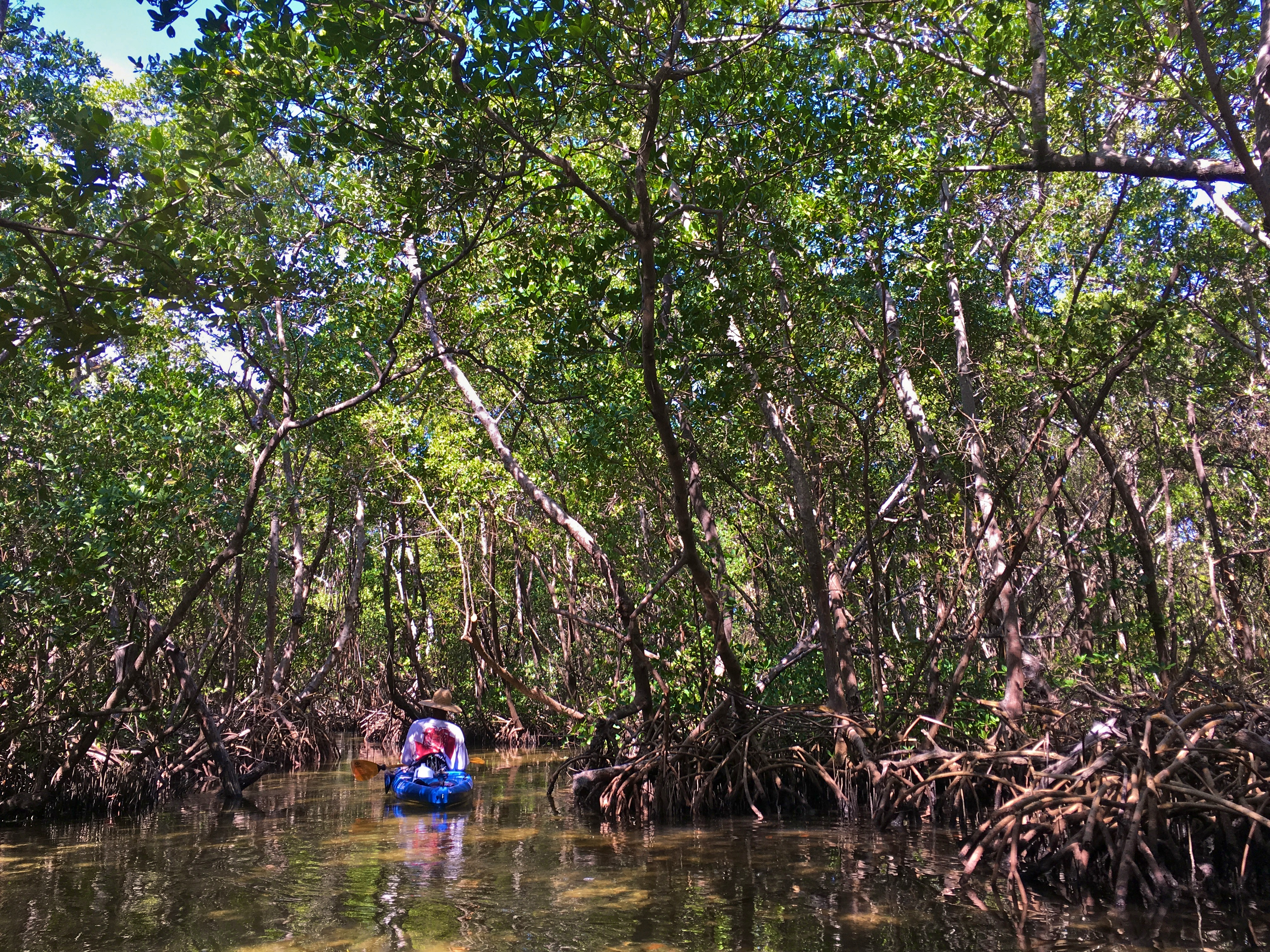
An ecotourist on a kayak tunnel through red mangrove trees and roots at Lido Key

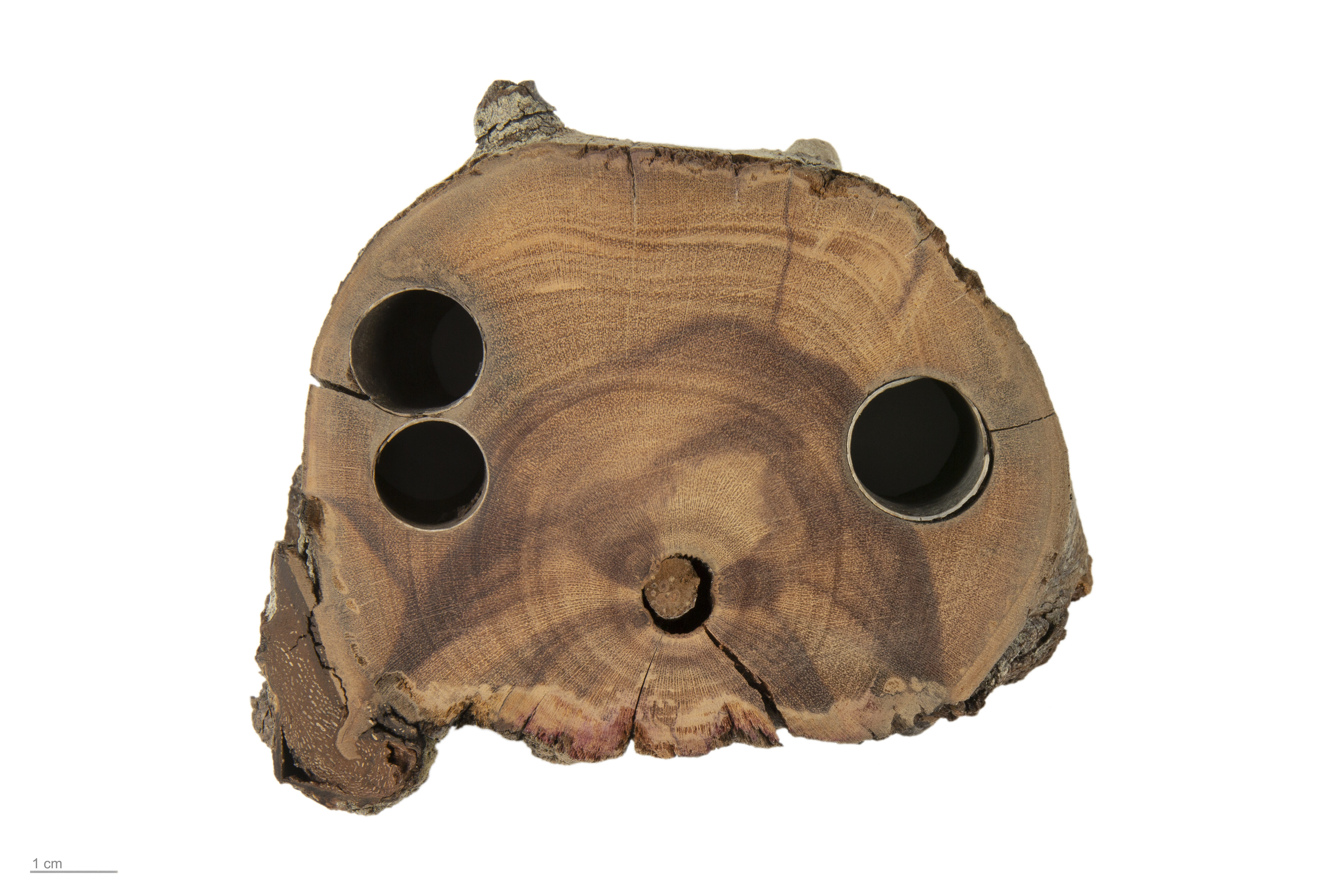
Rhizophora mangle – MHNT

== See also ==
- Wetland
