= Nicotinamide cofactor analogues =

Nicotinamide cofactor analogues (mNADs), also called nicotinamide coenzyme biomimetics (NCBs), are artificial compounds that mimic the natural nicotinamide adenine dinucleotide cofactors in structure, to explore a mechanism or be used in biocatalysis or other applications. These nicotinamide cofactor mimics generally retain the nicotinamide moiety with varying substituents.

== Background ==
An estimated 50% of oxidoreductases catalyze the transfer of a hydride using the nicotinamide adenine dinucleotide cofactor NAD(P). Nicotinamide adenine dinucleotide phosphate (NADPH) is used in anabolic reactions while nicotinamide adenine dinucleotide (NAD) is used in catabolic reactions. In the field of biocatalysis, NAD(P)-dependent oxidoreductases are widely used for the production of chiral alcohols, amines, and other valuable compounds. Yet the reduced forms of the cofactor, NADH and NADPH, needed for the catalysis, is too expensive to be used in stoichiometric amounts. Therefore a cofactor recycling system is usually employed.

== Analogues ==
Nicotinamide cofactor analogues have been synthesized with varying substituents on the dihydropyridine ring to tune their redox potential and stability, to replace NADH or NADPH in certain enzymatic reactions. These synthetic cofactors have been used as early as 1937 to better understand the mechanisms of enzymatic reactions, in particular of alcohol dehydrogenases. These cofactor analogues can serve as an alternative to traditional cofactor regeneration techniques and be used in orthogol pathways.
