= Keeping =

Keeping is a surname. Notable people with the surname include:

- Charles Keeping (1924–1988), British illustrator, children's book author and lithographer
- Damien Keeping (born 1982), Australian rules football coach
- Frederick Keeping (1867–1950), British racing cyclist
- Jack Keeping (born 1996), English cricketer
- Janet Keeping, Canadian professor and politician
- Jeff Keeping (born 1982), Canadian Football League defensive tackle
- Max Keeping (1942–2015), Canadian television news anchor
- Michael Keeping (1902–1984), English footballer and manager (son of Frederick Keeping)
- Tom Keeping (1942–2020), Canadian politician
- Walter Keeping (1854–1888), British geologist and museum curator

== See also ==
- Keep (disambiguation)
- Keeper (disambiguation)
- Keepers (disambiguation)
