= Andrea Gibb =

Scottish screenwriter and actress

Andrea Gibb is a Scottish screenwriter and actress.

== Early life and education ==
Andrea Gibb was born in Greenock, Scotland. She studied drama and sociology at Glasgow University and then did a post-graduate teaching degree at Manchester Polytechnic before going on to do an acting course at the Drama Studio London.

== Career ==
She acted regularly in theatre and television before she started writing. Her most high-profile role was as Deirdre, Calum Buchanan's girlfriend in All Creatures Great and Small. "When I was doing All Creatures, I had absolutely no desire, no intention, no belief that I could write," recalled Gibb in 2016. "It never occurred to me, and it was never something I imagined myself doing in the future. My writing career just happened, almost accidentally, and now I don't act very much at all. Occasionally I'll do the odd short film for a friend. I did a theatre job about three years ago that I absolutely loved. I miss actors and I miss that sense of camaraderie. You become a family." "I had just moved from London up to Liverpool and was doing a fair bit of acting in the North West around Liverpool, including at the Everyman, but I still had a London agent, so I was going down for auditions all the time. She rang me and asked if I'd be interested in going up for All Creatures Great and Small because they were looking for a Scottish character. At first I thought it was to play a vet and I was really excited, then I read the script and, of course, it transpired that Deirdre worked at the Ministry of Agriculture."

Gibb was also a regular presenter on the children's television programme Let's Pretend.

She was shortlisted for The Dennis Potter Award with her screenplay Lucky Bag and then went on to win a Mental Health Media Award for the film Golden Wedding, which she wrote for BBC Scotland. She then wrote the screenplays for Dear Frankie and AfterLife. Both these films were shot in her home town of Greenock at exactly the same time. She has a small cameo role in Dear Frankie. Gibb was nominated for the BAFTA Award for Best Newcomer and the BAFTA Scotland award for best Screenwriter. She was nominated for a Scotland on Sunday/Glenfiddich Spirit of Scotland Award and won the Scottish Screen Bowmore filmmaker of the year award in 2005. She also won the Women in Film and Television Script award for her work on these two films.

Gibb is currently in development with several projects including high-profile adaptations of Swallows and Amazons for BBC Films, Vikram Seth's An Equal Music for Cuba Pictures, Rose Tremain's The Road Home for BBC 2 and Andrea Gillies's Keeper and Andrew O'Hagan novel Mayflies for BBC1.
