= Moesziomyces antarcticus =

Scientific classification
- Kingdom: Fungi
- Division: Basidiomycota
- Class: Ustilaginomycetes
- Order: Ustilaginales
- Family: Ustilaginaceae
- Genus: Moesziomyces
- Species: M. antarcticus

Binomial name
- Moesziomyces antarcticus (Goto, Sugiy. & Iizuka) Q.M. Wang, Begerow, F.Y. Bai & Boekhout (2015)

Synonyms
- Sporobolomyces antarcticus Goto, Sugiy. & Iizuka (1969); Candida antarctica (Goto, Sugiy. & Iizuka) Kurtzman, M.J. Smiley, C.J. Johnson & M.J. Hoffman (1983); Vanrija antarctica (Goto, Sugiy. & Iizuka) R.T. Moore (1987); Pseudozyma antarctica (Goto, Sugiy. & Iizuka) Boekhout (1995)

Species of fungus

Moesziomyces antarcticus is a species of fungus in the order Ustilaginales. The species occurs as a yeast and it was first isolated from Antarctic lake sediment in 1969. As a pathogen, it is a rare cause of human fungaemia infections.

The yeast is a source of important industrial enzymes:

Immobilized Moesziomyces antarcticus lipase can be used to catalyze the regioselective acylation of flavonoids or direct acylation with phenolic acids.

Moesziomyces antarcticus contains a lipase enzyme (Candida antarctica) that is able to cleave ester bonds in PET plastic.
