= Tricaprin =

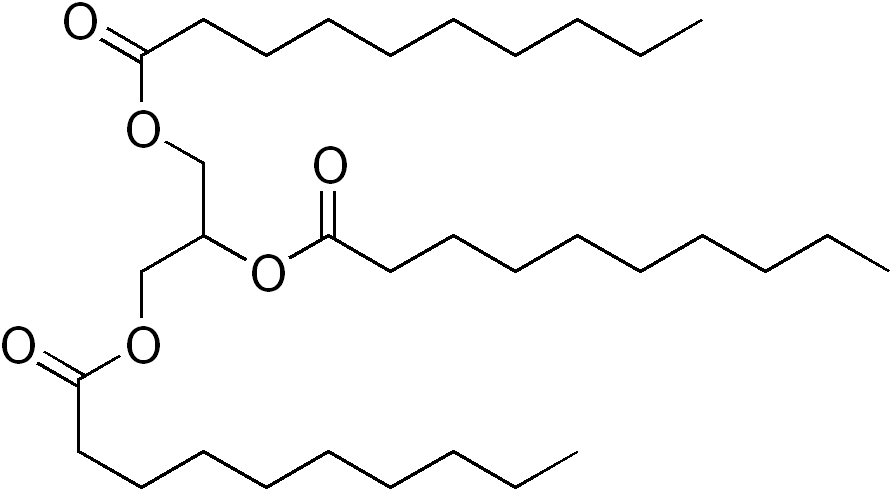
- Skeletal formula of decanoic acid

Names
- Preferred IUPAC name 2,3-di(decanoyloxy)propyl decanoate
- Other names Tridecanoin; Glyceryl tricaprate

Identifiers
CAS Number	621-71-6
3D model (JSmol)	Interactive image
ChEBI	CHEBI:77388
ChemSpider	62521
ECHA InfoCard	100.009.730
EC Number	210-702-0
PubChem CID	69310
UNII	O1PB8EU98M
CompTox Dashboard (EPA)	DTXSID1042651
- InChI: InChI=1S/C33H62O6/c1-4-7-10-13-16-19-22-25-31(34)37-28-30(39-33(36)27-24-21-18-15-12-9-6-3)29-38-32(35)26-23-20-17-14-11-8-5-2/h30H,4-29H2,1-3H3 Key: LADGBHLMCUINGV-UHFFFAOYSA-N
- SMILES: CCCCCCCCCC(=O)OCC(COC(=O)CCCCCCCCC)OC(=O)CCCCCCCCC

Properties
Chemical formula	C_{33}H_{62}O_{6}
Molar mass	554.853 g·mol^{−1}
Appearance	White (light yellow?) crystals
Melting point	31 °C (88 °F; 304 K)

Thermochemistry
Heat capacity (C)	1109 J/mol·K
Std enthalpy of formation (Δ_{f}H^{⦵}_{298})	−1985.1 kJ/mol
Std enthalpy of combustion (Δ_{c}H^{⦵}_{298})	19861.4 ± 1.8 kJ/mol

Hazards
- Occupational safety and health (OHS/OSH)
Main hazards	Not classified as a hazardous substance
- Lethal dose or concentration (LD, LC)
LD_{50} (median dose)	>10 g/kg (mouse, intravenous)
Safety data sheet (SDS)	External MSDS
- Except where otherwise noted, data are given for materials in their standard state (at 25 °C [77 °F], 100 kPa). Infobox references

Tricaprin or tridecanoin is a triglyceride of capric acid and a component of MCT oil. Its formula is C_{33}H_{62}O_{6}.

== Occurrence ==
Tricaprin occurs naturally in the seeds of Umbellularia californica, a hardwood tree native to North America.

== Production ==
Tricaprin and other medium-chain triglycerides (MCTs) are either isolated from natural or genetically engineered sources in the production of MCT oils, or are synthesized on a large scale through the esterification of medium-chain fatty acids with glycerol, specifically capric acid in the case of tricaprin. These esterification reactions have been investigated with a focus on enzyme catalysis as an alternative to traditional manufacturing processes that take place at high temperature and pressure, which result in poorer quality product at low yield. Compared to similar reactions used in the synthesis of other MCTs, tricaprin has a slow conversion rate from capric acid in the presence of lipozyme.

== Uses ==
Tricaprin is used as an additive to diesel fuel and as part of current and speculative biodiesels.

=== Pharmacological ===
Tricaprin has been indicated as a possible drug to increase the production of insulin and decrease the production of androgen in the body when taken orally. It, along with other medium-chain triglycerides, has been studied as a treatment option to prevent ruptures of abdominal aortic aneurysm, and has been specifically studied as a regulator of membrane functions and in the heart to facilitate lipolysis.

== See also ==
- Tributyrin
- Tricaprylin
