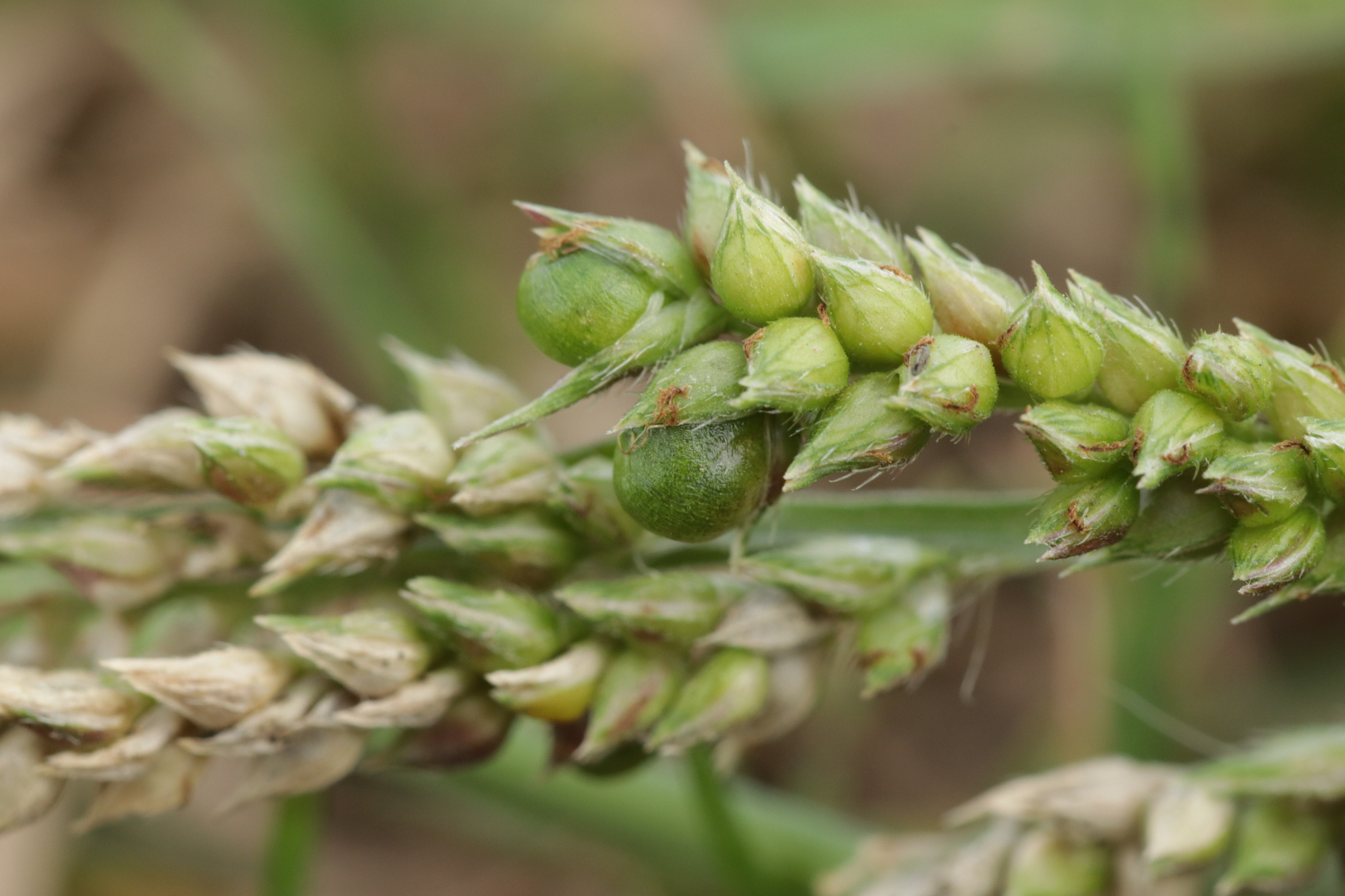
- Moesziomyces bullatus in Germany

Scientific classification
- Kingdom: Fungi
- Division: Basidiomycota
- Class: Ustilaginomycetes
- Order: Ustilaginales
- Family: Ustilaginaceae
- Genus: Moesziomyces
- Species: M. bullatus

Binomial name
- Moesziomyces bullatus (J. Schröt.) Vánky, (1977)

Synonyms
- Moesziomyces penicillariae Sorosporium bullatum Sorosporium senegalense Tolyposporidium penicillariae Tolyposporium penicillariae Tolyposporium senegalense

= Moesziomyces bullatus =

Species of fungus

Moesziomyces bullatus is a fungal plant pathogen.
