= The Keeper =

The Keeper, or its plural The Keepers, may refer to:

== Films ==
- The Keepers (1959 film), English-language release of French film La Tête contre les murs
- The Keeper (1976 film), starring Christopher Lee
- The Keeper (1995 film), starring Regina Taylor
- The Keeper (2002 film), with music composed by Evan Evans
- The Keeper (2004 film), starring Dennis Hopper and Asia Argento
- The Keeper: The Legend of Omar Khayyam, a 2005 film starring Vanessa Redgrave
- The Keeper (2009 film), starring Steven Seagal
- The Keeper (2018 film), a film about footballer Bert Trautmann

== Television ==
- The Keepers, a 2017 documentary teleseries about the murder of American nun Cathy Cesnik
- The Keepers (Australian TV series), a 1984 Australian television series

== Literature ==
- "The Keeper" (Piper short story), a 1957 short story by H. Beam Piper
- "The Keeper" (Dekker and Lee story), a 2011 short story by Ted Dekker and Tosca Lee
- "The Keepers", a 2012 novella by Barb Hendee in the Noble Dead Saga
- The Keeper, a 2014 novel by John Lescroart
- The Keeper, a 2022 graphic novel by Steven Barnes and Tananarive Due

== Music ==
- "The Keeper", a song written by Chris Cornell for the 2011 film Machine Gun Preacher
- "The Keepers", a song by Santigold from the 2012 album Master of My Make-Believe
- "The Keeper", a song by Blossoms from the 2020 album Foolish Loving Spaces

== People and characters ==
- The Keeper, a character in "The Cage", the pilot episode of Star Trek
- The Keeper, a character in "The Gamekeeper", an episode of Stargate SG-1

== Other uses ==
- The Keepers, a 1989 Australian play by Bob Maza

== See also ==
- Keeper (disambiguation)
- Keepers (disambiguation)
