= Keeper (chemistry) =

Keepers are substances (typically solvents, but sometimes adsorbent solids) added in relatively small quantities during an evaporative procedure in analytical chemistry, such as concentration of an analyte-solvent mixture by rotary evaporation. The purpose of a keeper is to reduce losses of a target analyte during the procedure. Keepers typically have reduced volatility and are added to a more volatile solvent.

In the case of volatile target analytes, it is difficult to totally avoid loss of the analyte in an evaporative procedure, but the presence of a keeper solvent or solid is intended to preferentially solvate or adsorb the analyte, so that the volatility of the analyte is reduced as the evaporative procedure continues. In the case of non-volatile target analytes, the presence of the keeper solvent or solid is intended to prevent all the solvent from being evaporated off, thereby preventing the loss of analytes which might irreversibly adsorb to the container walls when completely dried, or if it is totally dried (in the case of a solid keeper), provide a surface where the analyte can be reversibly rather than irreversibly adsorbed. A solid keeper of sodium sulfate has been shown to be effective for reducing losses of polycyclic aromatic hydrocarbons (PAHs) in evaporative procedures.

== Solvents commonly used as keepers ==
The following solvents are commonly used as keepers:

Keeper solvent	M.W. (g/mol)	Boiling point (˚C)	Vapor pressure (Pa)	LogP
toluene	92.14	110.6	3786.4	2.73
dimethylformamide (DMF)	73.10	153.0	516.0	−1.01
n-octanol	130.23	195.1	10.6	3.00
nonane	128.26	150.8	593.3	5.65
diglyme	134.17	145.3	394.6	−0.36
n-tetradecane	198.40	205.7	18.0	7.20
n-nonanol	144.26	220.1	3.1	3.77
isooctane	99.2	99.2	6572.8	4.09
ethylene glycol	197.3	197.3	12.3	−1.36
decane	174.1	174.1	190.7	5.01
undecane	195.9	195.9	54.9	5.74
dimethyl sulfoxide (DMSO)	189.0	189.0	81.3	−1.35
tricaprin (glycerol tridecanoate)	554.86	540.0	9.0*10^{−9}	12.15
dodecane	170.34	216.3	18.0	6.10
1-hexanol	102.18	157.6	123.7	2.03
methanol	32.04	64.7	16931.9	−0.77
