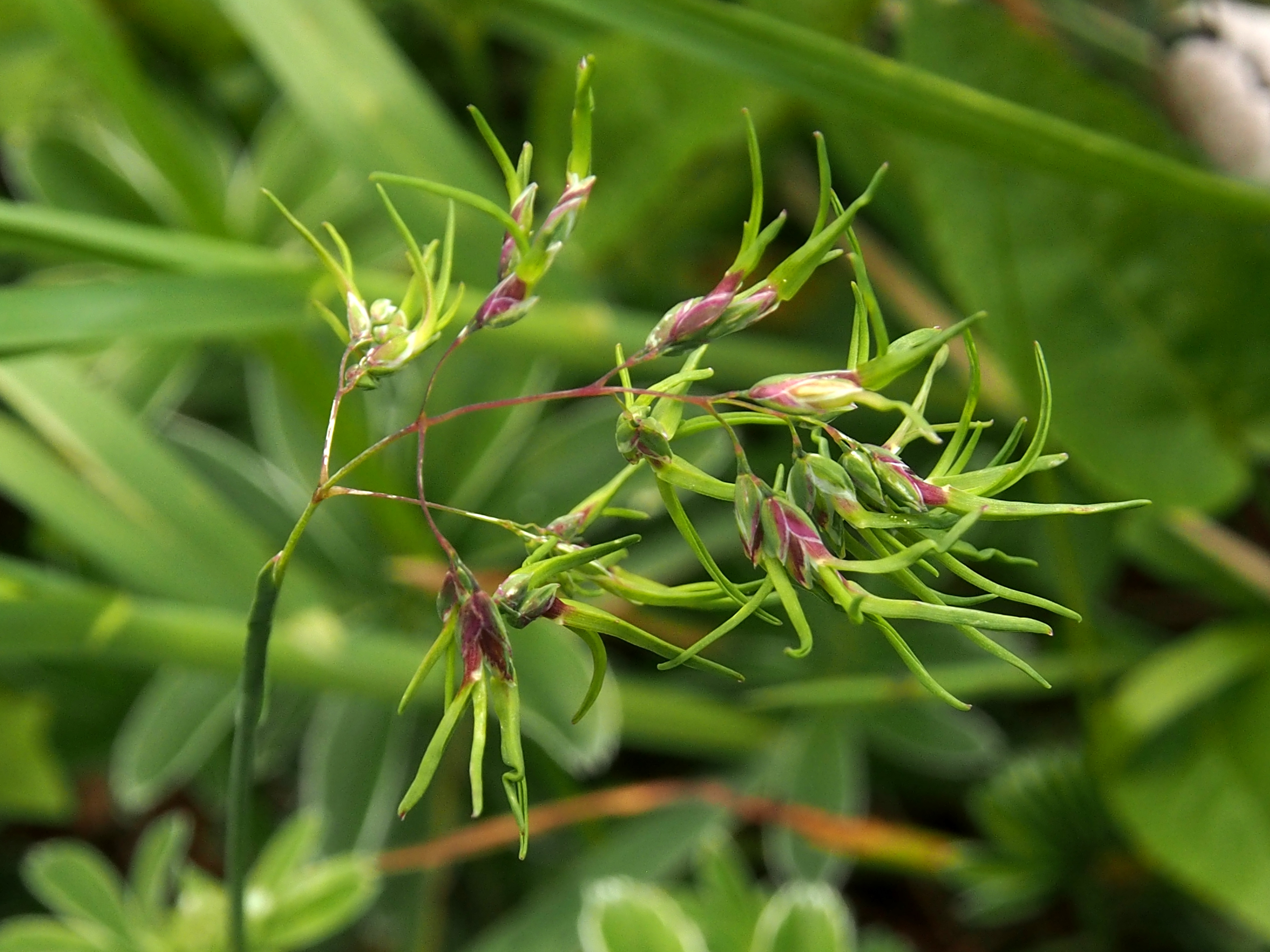
- A pseudoviviparous plant

Scientific classification
- Kingdom: Plantae
- Clade: Tracheophytes
- Clade: Angiosperms
- Clade: Monocots
- Clade: Commelinids
- Order: Poales
- Family: Poaceae
- Subfamily: Pooideae
- Genus: Poa
- Species: P. alpina

Binomial name
- Poa alpina L.

= Poa alpina =

Species of grass

Poa alpina, commonly known as alpine meadow-grass or alpine bluegrass, is a species of grass with a primarily holarctic distribution.

It is noted for being pseudoviviparous: in place of seeds, it sometimes reproduces asexually, creating new plantlets in the spikelets. The plantlets represent a developmental change following sexual reproduction, as the spikelet apical meristems revert to vegetative growth following the production of floral tissue, producing an axis with true leaves. These plantlets can produce roots and fall off, but typically their growth on the mother plant and the senescence of the main stem makes the entire structure lean over and touch the ground, where the mass of plantlets and roots can establish together. This vegetative reproduction mechanism is thought to be an advantage in variable alpine environments where pollination and sexual reproduction is inconsistent.

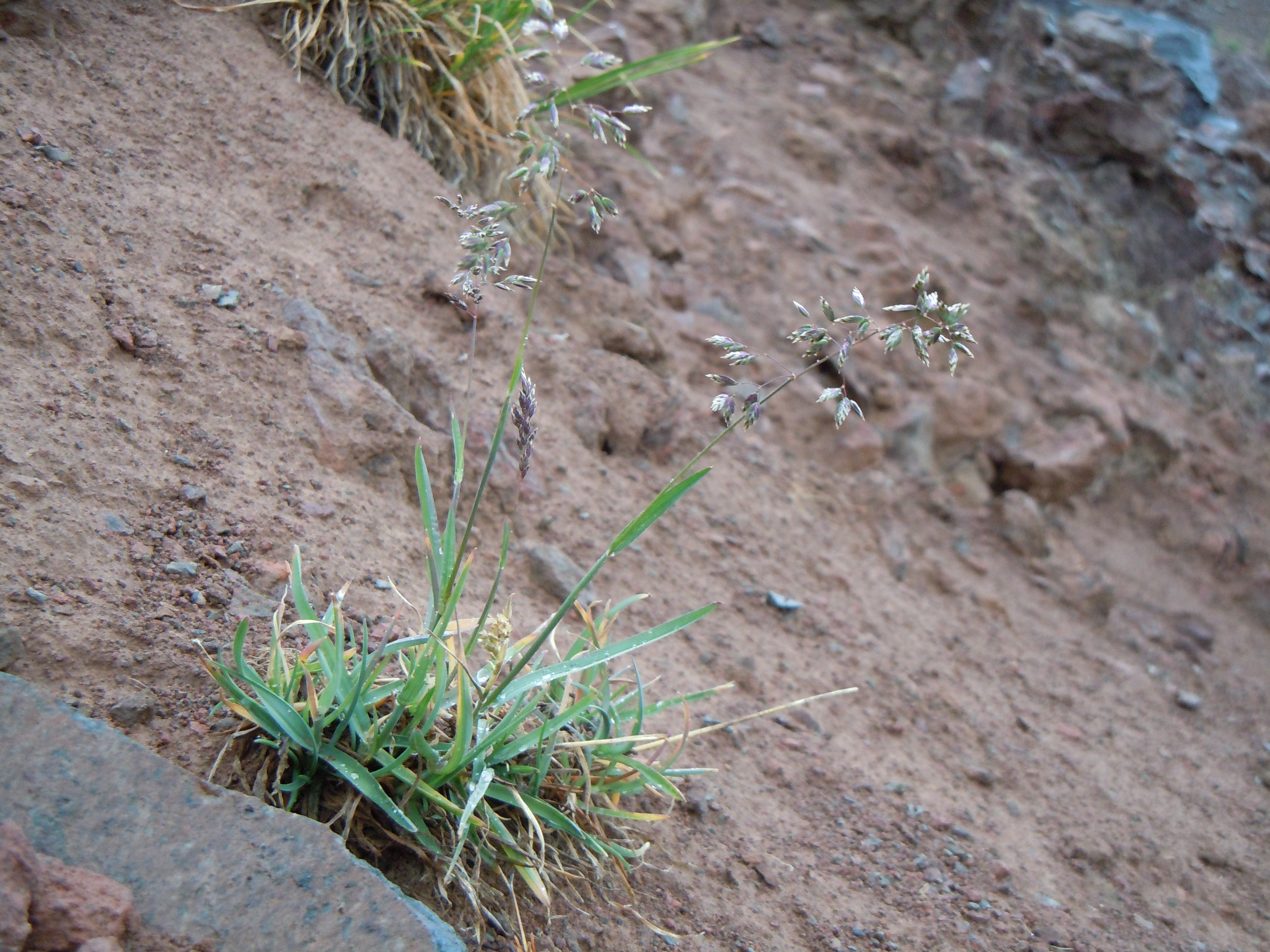
In Montana, USA

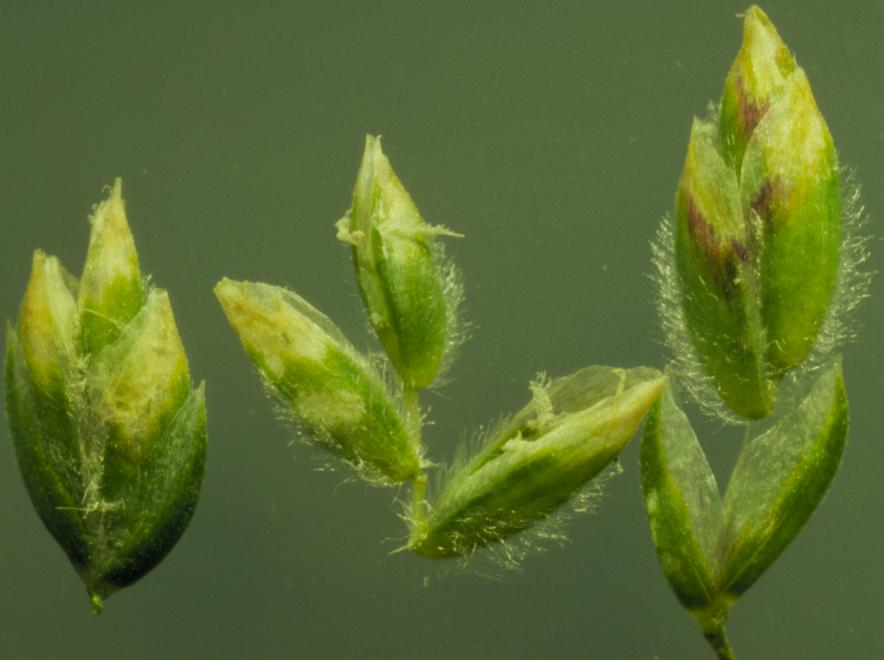
Spikelets with hairy lemmas
