= Perequê-Áçu River =

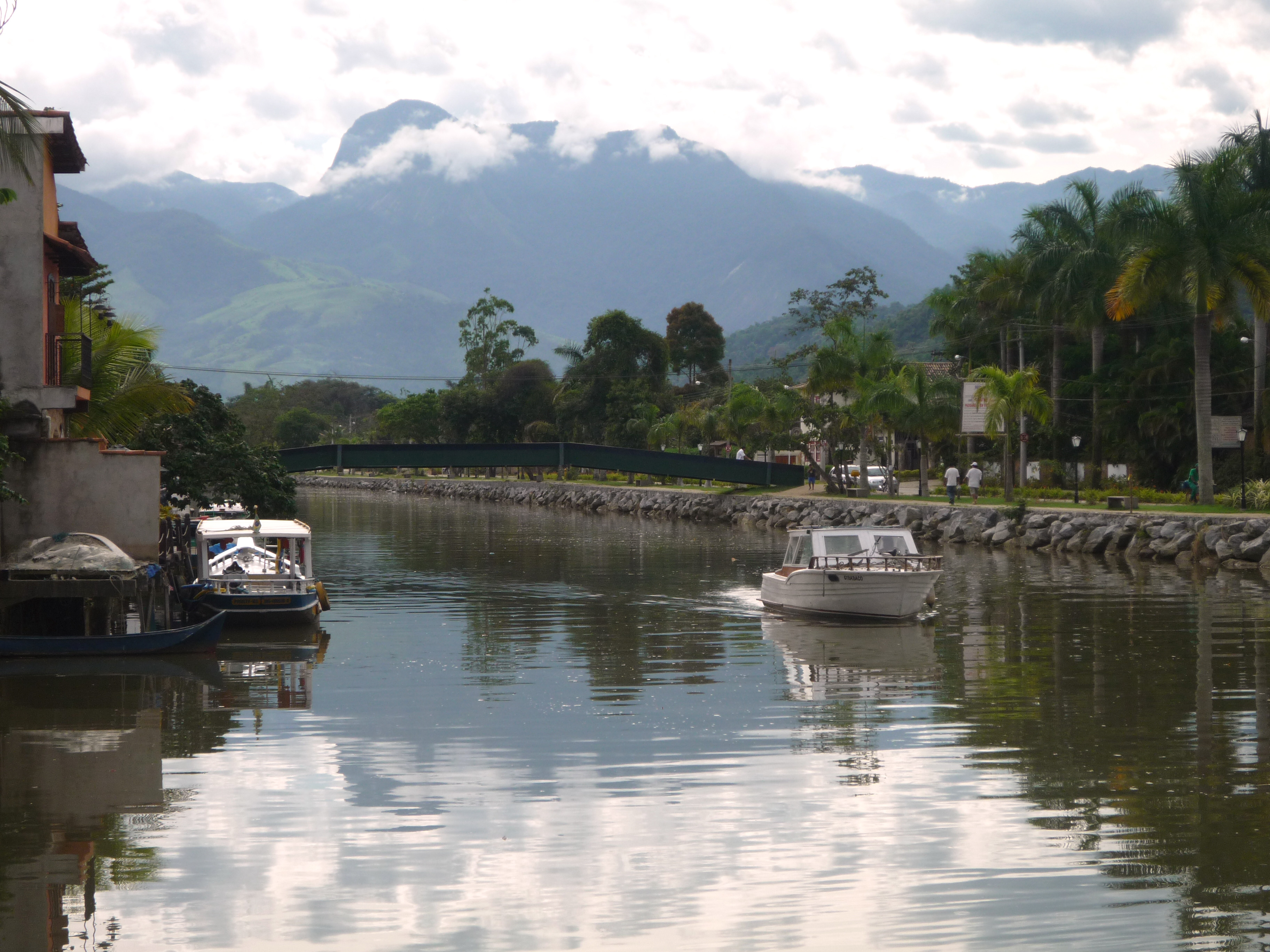

Location
- Country: Brazil

Physical characteristics
- Source
  - location: Rio de Janeiro state
- Mouth: Ribeira Bay
  - coordinates: 23°13′S 44°43′W

The Perequê-Áçu River is a river of Rio de Janeiro state in southeastern Brazil.

Mangroves and Rhizophora mangle can be found along the river.

== See also ==
- List of rivers of Rio de Janeiro

== Other sources ==
- Brazilian Ministry of Transport
