= False vivipary =

Abnormal condition affecting plants

False vivipary is an abnormal condition found in many types of plants in which a plantlet is produced where the flower should appear. It is not a completely understood topic, but some say it could be caused by a hormonal mistake. The plantlet which appears can be rooted and grown like normal plants. This abnormal behavior can occasionally be seen in many types of carnivorous plants. and in many certain species of aloe, such as agave.

== See also ==
- Propagule
- Vivipary
