= Vivipary =

Plant seeds developing before detachment

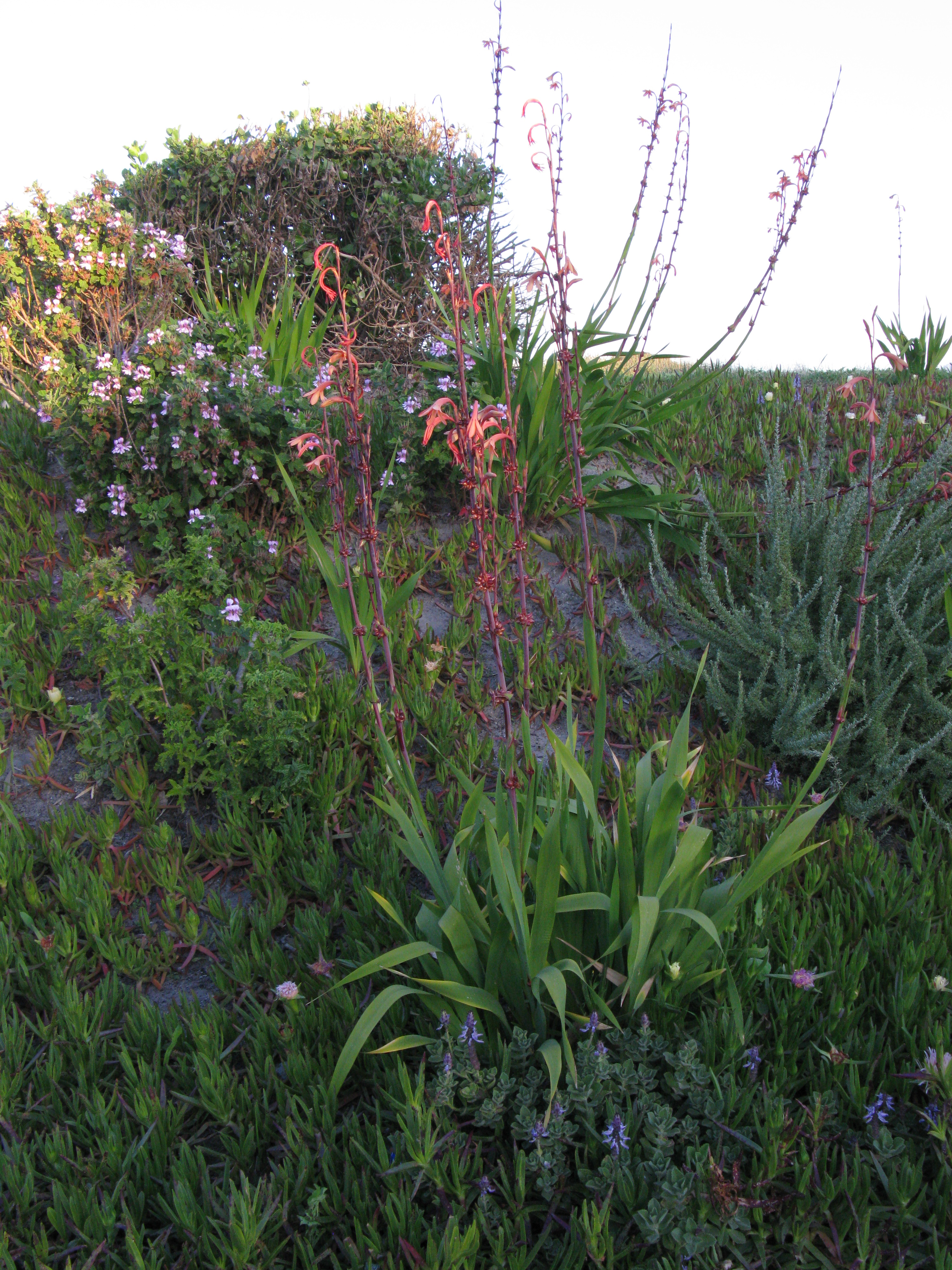
Watsonia meriana, near the end of flowering, has cormlets that eventually drop and root.

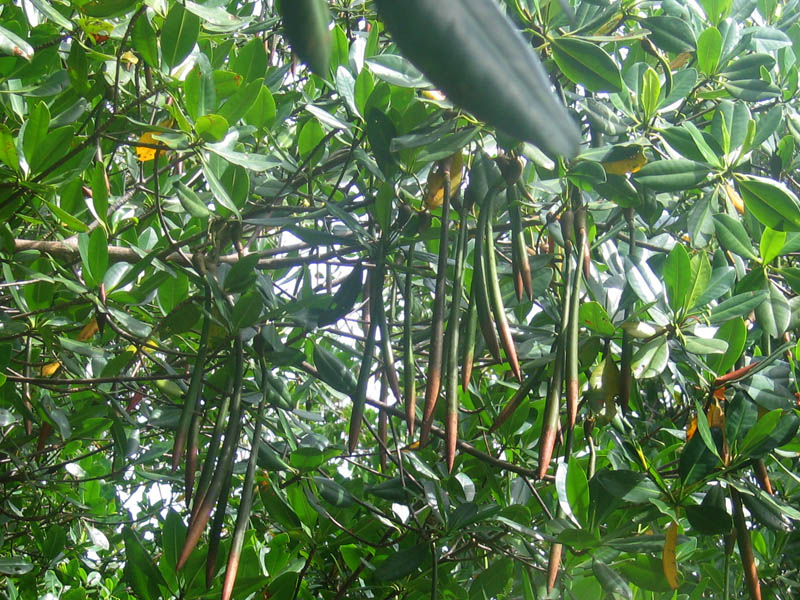
Red mangrove seeds germinate while still on the parent tree.

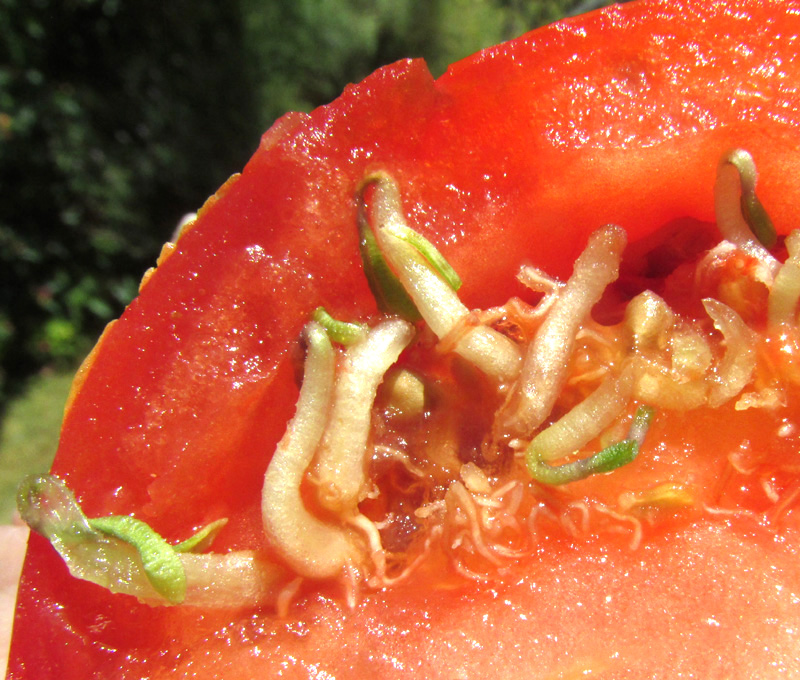
Vivipary in overripe tomato

In plants, vivipary occurs when seeds or embryos begin to develop before they detach from the parent. Plants such as some Iridaceae and Agavoideae grow cormlets in the axils of their inflorescences. These fall and in favourable circumstances they have effectively a whole season's start over fallen seeds. Similarly, some Crassulaceae, such as Bryophyllum, develop and drop plantlets from notches in their leaves, ready to grow. Such production of embryos from somatic tissues is asexual vegetative reproduction that amounts to cloning.

== Description ==
Most seed-bearing fruits produce a hormone that suppresses germination until after the fruit or parent plant dies, or the seeds pass through an animal's digestive tract. At this stage, the hormone's effect will dissipate and germination will occur once conditions are suitable. Some species lack this suppressant hormone as a central part of their reproductive strategy. For example, fruits that develop in climates without large seasonal variations. This phenomenon occurs most frequently on ears of corn, tomatoes, strawberries, peppers, pears, citrus fruits, and plants that grow in mangrove environments.

In some species of mangroves, for instance, the seed germinates and grows from its own resources while still attached to its parent. Seedlings of some species are dispersed by currents if they drop into the water, but others develop a heavy, straight taproot that commonly penetrates mud when the seedling drops, thereby effectively planting the seedling. This contrasts with the examples of vegetative reproduction mentioned above, in that the mangrove plantlets are true seedlings produced by sexual reproduction.

In some trees, like jackfruit, some citrus, and avocado, the seeds can be found already germinated while the fruit goes overripe; strictly speaking this condition cannot be described as vivipary, but the moist and humid conditions provided by the fruit mimic a wet soil that encourages germination. However, the seeds also can germinate under moist soil.

== Reproduction ==
Vivipary includes reproduction via embryos, such as shoots or bulbils, as opposed to germinating externally from a dropped, dormant seed, as is usual in plants;

== Pseudovivipary ==
A few plants are pseudoviviparous – instead of reproducing with seeds, there are monocots that can reproduce asexually by creating new plantlets in their spikelets. Examples are seagrass species belonging to the genus Posidonia and the alpine meadow-grass, Poa alpina.

== See also ==
- False vivipary
