= Industrial enzymes =

Biological catalysts used in production

Industrial enzymes are enzymes that are commercially used in a variety of industries such as pharmaceuticals, chemical production, biofuels, food and beverage, and consumer products. Due to advancements in recent years, biocatalysis through isolated enzymes is considered more economical than use of whole cells. Enzymes may be used as a unit operation within a process to generate a desired product, or may be the product of interest. Industrial biological catalysis through enzymes has experienced rapid growth in recent years due to their ability to operate at mild conditions, and exceptional chiral and positional specificity, things that traditional chemical processes lack. Isolated enzymes are typically used in hydrolytic and isomerization reactions. Whole cells are typically used when a reaction requires a co-factor. Although co-factors may be generated in vitro, it is typically more cost-effective to use metabolically active cells. An approach for cost reduction in enzyme catalyzed industrial processes is the utilization biomimetic cofactors.

== Enzymes as a unit of operation ==
=== Immobilization ===
Despite their excellent catalytic capabilities, enzymes and their properties must be improved prior to industrial implementation in many cases. Some aspects of enzymes that must be improved prior to implementation are stability, activity, inhibition by reaction products, and selectivity towards non-natural substrates. This may be accomplished through immobilization of enzymes on a solid material, such as a porous support. Immobilization of enzymes greatly simplifies the recovery process, enhances process control, and reduces operational costs. Many immobilization techniques exist, such as adsorption, covalent binding, affinity, and entrapment. Ideal immobilization processes should not use highly toxic reagents in the immobilization technique to ensure stability of the enzymes. After immobilization is complete, the enzymes are introduced into a reaction vessel for biocatalysis.

==== Adsorption ====
Enzyme adsorption onto carriers functions based on chemical and physical phenomena such as van der Waals forces, ionic interactions, and hydrogen bonding. These forces are weak, and as a result, do not affect the structure of the enzyme. A wide variety of enzyme carriers may be used. Selection of a carrier is dependent upon the surface area, particle size, pore structure, and type of functional group.

==== Covalent binding ====
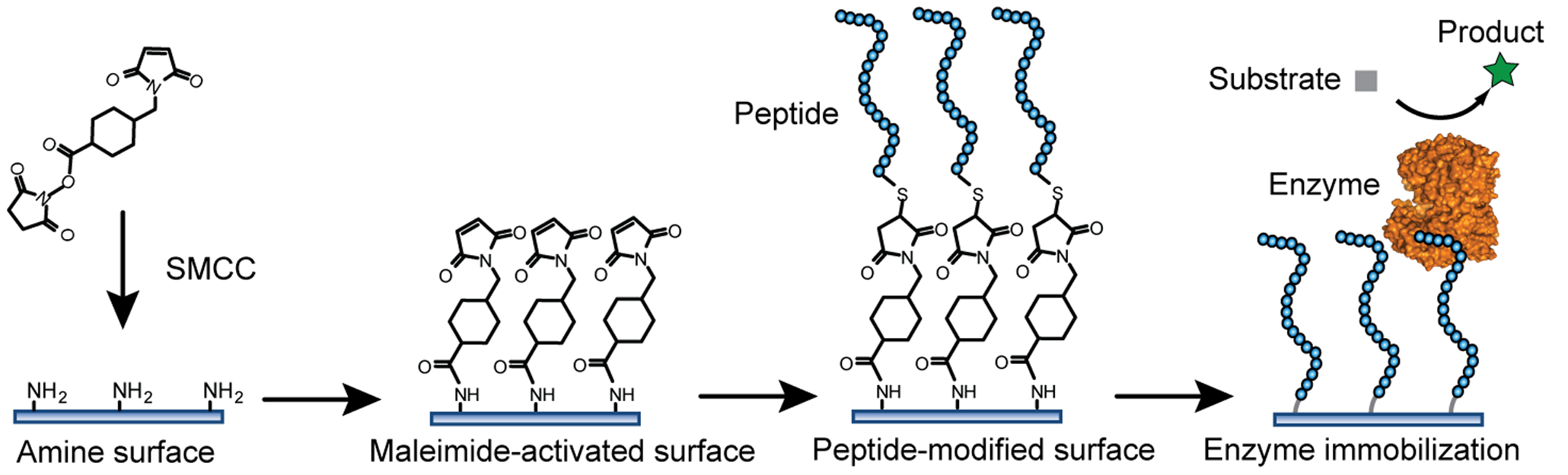
Example of Enzyme Immobilization through Covalent Binding

Many binding chemistries may be used to adhere an enzyme to a surface to varying degrees of success. The most successful covalent binding techniques include binding via glutaraldehyde to amino groups and N-hydroxysuccinide esters. These immobilization techniques occur at ambient temperatures in mild conditions, which have limited potential to modify the structure and function of the enzyme.

==== Affinity ====
Immobilization using affinity relies on the specificity of an enzyme to couple an affinity ligand to an enzyme to form a covalently bound enzyme-ligand complex. The complex is introduced into a support matrix for which the ligand has high binding affinity, and the enzyme is immobilized through ligand-support interactions.

==== Entrapment ====
Immobilization using entrapment relies on trapping enzymes within gels or fibers, using non-covalent interactions. Characteristics that define a successful entrapping material include high surface area, uniform pore distribution, tunable pore size, and high adsorption capacity.

=== Recovery ===
Enzymes typically constitute a significant operational cost for industrial processes, and in many cases, must be recovered and reused to ensure economic feasibility of a process. Although some biocatalytic processes operate using organic solvents, the majority of processes occur in aqueous environments, improving the ease of separation. Most biocatalytic processes occur in batch, differentiating them from conventional chemical processes. As a result, typical bioprocesses employ a separation technique after bioconversion. In this case, product accumulation may cause inhibition of enzyme activity. Ongoing research is performed to develop in situ separation techniques, where product is removed from the batch during the conversion process. Enzyme separation may be accomplished through solid-liquid extraction techniques such as centrifugation or filtration, and the product-containing solution is fed downstream for product separation.

Enzymes as a Unit Operation
Enzyme	Industry	Application
Palatase	Food	Enhance cheese flavor
Lipozyme TL IM	Food	Interesterification of vegetable oil
Lipase AK Amano	Pharmaceutical	Synthesis of chiral compounds
Lipopan F	Food	Emulsifier
Cellulase	Biofuel	Class of enzymes that degrade cellulose to glucose monomers
Amylase	Food/biofuel	Class of enzymes that degrade starch to glucose monomers
Xylose isomerase	Food	High-fructose corn syrup production
Resinase	Paper	Pitch control in paper processing
Penicillin amidase	Pharmaceutical	Synthetic antibiotic production
Amidase	Chemical	Class of enzymes used for non-proteinogenic enantiomerically pure amino acid production

== Enzymes as a desired product ==
To industrialize an enzyme, the following upstream and downstream enzyme production processes are considered:

=== Upstream ===
Upstream processes are those that contribute to the generation of the enzyme.

==== Selection of a suitable enzyme ====
An enzyme must be selected based upon the desired reaction. The selected enzyme defines the required operational properties, such as pH, temperature, activity, and substrate affinity.

==== Identification and selection of a suitable source for the selected enzyme ====
The choice of a source of enzymes is an important step in the production of enzymes. It is common to examine the role of enzymes in nature and how they relate to the desired industrial process. Enzymes are most commonly sourced through bacteria, fungi, and yeast. Once the source of the enzyme is selected, genetic modifications may be performed to increase the expression of the gene responsible for producing the enzyme.

==== Process development ====
Process development is typically performed after genetic modification of the source organism, and involves the modification of the culture medium and growth conditions. In many cases, process development aims to reduce mRNA hydrolysis and proteolysis.

==== Large scale production ====
Scaling up of enzyme production requires optimization of the fermentation process. Most enzymes are produced under aerobic conditions, and as a result, require constant oxygen input, impacting fermenter design. Due to variations in the distribution of dissolved oxygen, as well as temperature, pH, and nutrients, the transport phenomena associated with these parameters must be considered. The highest possible productivity of the fermenter is achieved at maximum transport capacity of the fermenter.

=== Downstream ===
Downstream processes are those that contribute to separation or purification of enzymes.

==== Removal of insoluble materials and recovery of enzymes from the source ====
The procedures for enzyme recovery depend on the source organism, and whether enzymes are intracellular or extracellular. Typically, intracellular enzymes require cell lysis and separation of complex biochemical mixtures. Extracellular enzymes are released into the culture medium, and are much simpler to separate. Enzymes must maintain their native conformation to ensure their catalytic capability. Since enzymes are very sensitive to pH, temperature, and ionic strength of the medium, mild isolation conditions must be used.

==== Concentration and primary purification of enzymes ====
Depending on the intended use of the enzyme, different levels purity are required. For example, enzymes used for diagnostic purposes must be separated to a higher purity than bulk industrial enzymes to prevent catalytic activity that provides erroneous results. Enzymes used for therapeutic purposes typically require the most rigorous separation. Most commonly, a combination of chromatography steps is employed for separation.

The purified enzymes are either sold in pure form and sold to other industries, or added to consumer goods.

Enzymes as a Desired Product
Enzyme	Industry	Application
Novozym-435	Consumer Goods	Isopropyl myristate production (cosmetic)
Bromelain	Food	Meat tenderizer
Noopazyme	Food	Improve noodle quality
Asparaginase	Pharmaceutical	Lymphatic cancer therapeutic
Ficin	Pharmaceutical	Digestive aid
Urokinase	Pharmaceutical	Anticoagulant
β-Lactamase	Pharmaceutical	Penicillin allergy treatment
Subtilisin	Consumer Goods	Laundry detergent

== See also ==
- Industrial ecology
- Industrial fermentation
- Industrial microbiology
