= Goalkeeper (disambiguation) =

Goalkeeper is a playing position in many team sports which involve scoring goals.

Goalkeeper or goalkeepers may also refer to:

== Specific sports ==
- Goalkeeper (association football)
  - Goalkeeper glove
  - Goalkeepers coach
- Goalkeeper (bandy)
- Floorball#Goalkeepers
- Handball goalkeeper
- Goalkeeper (field hockey)
- Goaltender, ice hockey
  - Save (goaltender)
- Goalkeeper (Gaelic games), covering Gaelic football, hurling and camogie
- Goalkeeper (water polo)
- Goaltender (field lacrosse), in the men's outdoor sport
- Goaltender (women's lacrosse), in the women's outdoor sport
- Goaltender (box lacrosse), in the indoor sport
- Goalkeeper (netball)

== Other uses ==
- Goalkeeper CIWS, a Dutch close-in naval weapon system
- Goalkeepers (Gates Foundation), an initiative to bring together leaders from around the world to accelerate progress toward achieving the Sustainable Development Goals
- The Goalkeeper (1936 film), Soviet film
- The Goalkeeper (2000 film), Spanish film
- The Goalkeeper (2018 film), Bolivian film
- The Goalkeeper (video game), see List of Macintosh games

== See also ==
- Crab Goalkeeper, a 2006 Japanese film
- Goalie (disambiguation)
- Goalkeeper of the Galaxy or Cosmoball, a 2020 Russian film
- Goaltender mask, in various sports
- The Goalkeeper's Fear of the Penalty, a 1972 German film
- Theodore the Goalkeeper, a 1950 Austrian-German film
