= Jack Keeping =

English cricketer (born 1996)

Personal information
- Full name: Jack Benjamin Robert Keeping
- Born: 19 September 1996 (age 30); Northampton, Northamptonshire, England
- Batting: Right-handed

Domestic team information
- Years: Team
- 2017–2019: Bedfordshire
- 2018–2019: Cambridge MCCU

Career statistics
Competition	First-class
Matches	2
Runs scored	10
Batting average	10.00
100s/50s	–/–
Top score	10
Balls bowled	36
Wickets	1
Bowling average	23.00
5 wickets in innings	–
10 wickets in match	–
Best bowling	1/23
Catches/stumpings	1/–
- Source: Cricinfo, 25 July 2019

Jack Benjamin Robert Keeping (born 19 September 1996) is an English former first-class cricketer.

Keeping was born at Northampton and was educated at Stowe School, before going up to Anglia Ruskin University. While studying at Anglia Ruskin, he made two appearances in first-class cricket for Cambridge MCCU against Essex in 2018 and Nottinghamshire in 2019. In addition to playing first-class cricket, Keeping also plays minor counties cricket for Bedfordshire, having made to date ten appearances in the Minor Counties Championship, four appearances in the MCCA Knockout Trophy and ten appearances in the Minor Counties T20.
