= Rush goalie =

Rule in informal football games

Rush goalie, also known as a fly goalie or fly keeper and in some parts of the UK, goalie when or nearest dearest, is a variation of association football in which the role of the goalkeeper is more flexible than normal. The goalkeeper position is taken by any player who can run out of and leave their goal to actively participate in outfield play. However, when defending the player returns to their goal and takes up the role of goalkeeper once again; in rush goalie only one player can be the goalkeeper and handle the ball. Once the danger has passed, that player (the "rush goalie") returns to normal outfield play. Rush goalie is only played in informal football matches, usually by children, and often when the players want to play a more active role in the game than the position of goalkeeper would normally allow; it can also be applied when the number of players per side is low.

A rush goalie system can also be used as a way of leveling out teams when playing with an uneven number of players – usually, the team with an extra man will be forced to nominate one player to stay in goal permanently (also known as stick keeper or simply sticks), while the other team is allowed to play rush.

== Variations ==
A variation of the game is known as Last Man Back, magic rush, Spock (in the West Midlands), spider goalie, monkey rush, rush and veg, scramble (Kent, London, and the South East of England), or butterfly (East Anglia). In Last Man Back no player is chosen as the goalkeeper for a team, and all players participate in outfield play, usually leaving the position of goalkeeper open. However, when the other team is on the attack, the closest player to the net or the Last Man Back is allowed to handle the ball, taking on the role of goalkeeper.

This can create controversy as to who was actually the closest player to the net, so sometimes Nets is played. In this variant, players are only allowed to handle the ball in the area provided they have shouted "nets" or "when" (or other regional variants) before touching the ball.

Another variation, common on schoolgrounds in Canada, includes the ability of multiple players to play the role of goalkeeper, simultaneously. Any player may make a play with their hands as if they were the goalkeeper, as long as they are in the goal area, or "crease".

== See also ==
- Sweeper-keeper
