= Thermomyces lanuginosus =

Scientific classification
- Kingdom: Fungi
- Division: Ascomycota
- Class: Eurotiomycetes
- Order: Eurotiales
- Family: Trichocomaceae
- Genus: Thermomyces
- Species: T. lanuginosus

Binomial name
- Thermomyces lanuginosus Tsiklinsky (1899)

Synonyms
- Humicola brevis var. thermoidea Subrahm. (1975); Humicola brevispora Subrahm. & Thirum (1999 ); Humicola grisea var. indica Subrahm. (1980); Humicola grisea var. thermoidea Cooney & R. Emers. (1964); Humicola insolens var. thermoidea (Cooney & R. Emers.)D.H. Ellis (1982); Humicola lanuginosa (Tsikl.) Bunce (1961); Humicola lanuginosa var. catenulata Morinaga (1986); Humicola lanuginosa var. lanuginosa (Tsikl.) Bunce (1961); Monotospora lanuginosa (Tsikl.) E.W. Mason, (1933); Sepedonium lanuginosum (Tsikl.) Griffon & Maubl. (1911)

Species of fungus

Thermomyces lanuginosus is a species of thermophilic fungus that belongs to Thermomyces, a genus of hemicellulose degraders. It is classified as a deuteromycete and no sexual form has ever been observed. It is the dominant fungus of compost heaps, due to its ability to withstand high temperatures and use complex carbon sources for energy. As the temperature of compost heaps rises and the availability of simple carbon sources decreases, it is able to out compete pioneer microflora. It plays an important role in breaking down the hemicelluloses found in plant biomass due to the many hydrolytic enzymes that it produces, such as lipolase, amylase, xylanase, phytase, and chitinase. These enzymes have chemical, environmental, and industrial applications due to their hydrolytic properties. They are used in the food, petroleum, pulp and paper, and animal feed industries, among others. A few rare cases of endocarditis due to T. lanuginosus have been reported in humans.

== History ==
The fungus was first described 1899 by Tsiklinskaya, after a chance discovery of it growing on a potato which had been inoculated with garden soil. It was later isolated in 1907 from leaves on warm compost piles by Hugo Miehe. Miehe was the first person to work with thermophilic microorganisms in his study of the spontaneous combustion of damp haystacks. T. lanuginosis was one of four species of thermophilic fungi isolated from self-heating hay by Miehe, along with Mucor pusillus, Thermoidium sulfureum, and Thermoascus aurantiacus.

The fungus was also isolated by a number of different researchers. Griffon and Maublanc isolated it from fungus on moist oats in 1911, but placed it in the genus Sepedonium, as did Velich in 1914. Kurt Noack isolated several thermophilic fungi from natural habitats, including T. lanuginosis, studying their physiology further. Cooney and Emerson provided taxonomic descriptions of the 13 known fungal species during WWII, while studying alternate sources of rubber.

== Taxonomy ==
This species has a number of synonyms, due to different names and categories being applied when it was first being described. Tsiklinskaya originally isolated and described the species, but failed to indicate the size of aleuriospores and didn't include drawings. Photographs of mycelium and spores were inconclusive because they didn't give a true picture of the size or structure due to failure in indicating the magnification. Due to this uncertainty, both Griffon and Maublanc (1911) and Velich (1914) placed it in the genus Sepedonium when they isolated and described it. It has also been placed in the Acremoniella category by Rege (1927) and Curzi (1929).

In 1933 the name Montospora lanuginosa was proposed by Mason, but this was followed by a trend towards accepting the genus Humicola, as proposed by Bunce (1961) because of the questionable status of Montosporra. It was Pugh et al. who reintroduced the genus Thermomyces. Although the literature occasionally refers to this species by the earlier name Humicola lanuginosa, it is now uniformly referred to by its current name Thermomyces lanuginosa.

== Genome ==
The fungus has a number of important industrial applications because it produces the largest amounts of hydrolyzing enzymes of any thermophilic fungus. This has led to an interest in studying its genetics, and subsequently resulted in the sequencing of its genome. The proteome of T. lanuginosis contains 5100 genes, with 83 tRNA genes. One of the features that has been discovered through sequencing of the genome is that the fungus has a ubiquitin degradation pathway, which helps it respond to various environmental stressors, such as nutrient limitation, heat shock, and heavy metal exposure, and may be essential for adaptation during rising temperatures. It is also capable of histone acetylation/deacetylation and contains high numbers of methylases, which play important roles in packing and condensation of DNA.

== Growth and morphology ==
Thermomyces lanuginosus is classified as a thermophile, and experiences rapid growth at high temperatures. In the lab, colonies can be cultured in a glucose-salt liquid medium fortified with peptone. Colonies are white and velvety at first, generally less than 1 mm high, but soon turn grey or green-ish grey, starting from the center. Mature colonies are dull dark brown to black, often with pink or vinaceous diffusing pigment secreted from the colony. Masses of developing aleuriophores can be seen on the fine, colourless hyphae of young colonies when viewed under a microscope. These aleuriophores are short, measure 10-15μ in length, and arise at right angles to the hyphae. They are generally unbranched but occasionally branch once or twice near the base, appearing as a cluster. Septations may occur but are often difficult to observe. Aleuriospores are borne singly at tips of the aleuriophores.

No teleomorph is known for this species. The asexual conida are borne singly on short stalks and are one celled, dark brown, with a roughened surface. Spores are colorless and smooth at first, but turn dark brown during maturation, and the thick exospore becomes wrinkled. Mature spores are spherical, irregularly shaped, and range from 6-10 μ in diameter. Both immature and mature spores can be easily separated from the aleuriophore, which usually ruptures slightly below the point of attachment, so free spores may be found with the top portion still attached.

Thermophilic moulds grown at high temperatures (above 50 °C) contain dense body vesicles in their hyphae that function as storage organelles, mainly for phospholipids. In T. lanuginosus, nine times more lipid storage vesicles are grown at 52 °C than 37 °C. Heavy pigmentation of spores allows them to withstand temperature and heat stress, and the pigments have been found to be similar to hydroxylated pigments in aphids.

== Physiology ==
=== Temperature effects ===
Thermophilic fungi are the only eukaryotic organisms that can grow above 45 °C. In general, the minimum temperature required for growth is at least 20 °C, while the maximum is 60 °C or 62 °C. The optimal growth temperature for T. lanuginosus is 45-50 °C. While the maximum yield of spores occurs at 25 °C, their growth is faster at 50 °C. No growth is observed at temperatures below 30 °C or above 60 °C. Enzyme sensitivity and activity of transporters in the fungus also temperature influenced.

=== Nutrition ===
Thermophilic fungi are unable to grow under anaerobic conditions and require oxygen to grow. While carbon dioxide is not a nutritional requirement for fungi, T. lanuginosis growth is severely affected by lack of it. This is most likely because carbon dioxide is required for the assimilation of pyruvate carboxylase, needed for development.

In compost heaps where the fungus is commonly found, the availability of soluble carbon decreases as temperature increases, and main carbon sources tend to be polysaccharides like cellulose and hemicellulose. T. lanuginosis is unable to utilize cellulose because it does not produce a cellulase, but it is well adapted to using other complex carbon sources such as hemicellulose. It is capable of growing commensally by using sugars released when cellulose is hydrolyzed by a cellulolytic partner. The hydrolytic products of cellulose and hemicellulose - glucose, xylose and mannose, are transported using the same proton-driven symport. This transport is constitutive, specific, and carrier-mediated, and its sensitivity is temperature dependent.

Thermomyces lanuginosis concurrently utilizes glucose and sucrose at 50 °C, with sucrose being utilized faster than glucose. Both sugars also used concurrently at 30 °C at nearly identical rates. The use of sucrose occurs at the same time as glucose for two major reasons: because the invertase is insensitive to catabolite repression by glucose, and because the activity of the glucose uptake system is repressed by glucose itself as well as by sucrose. The two sugars reciprocally influence their utilization in the mixture.

=== Enzymes ===
There are a number of enzymes secreted by T. lanuginosis, and many of them have applications in various industries.

==== Lipase ====
The lipase of T. lanuginosis has catalytic centre that contains three amino acids (serine-histidine-aspartic acid) and is covered by a short alpha-helical loop or "lid" that moves to allow substrate access to the active site. A single mutation in the serine alters the lid's motion, which affects enzyme binding affinity. The lipase also contains disulfide linkages but no free —SH group. The productivity and thermostability of the lipase differs with different strains, but it has been found to be stable at a pH of 4 to 11 and optimally active at 8.0. Temperature wise, some activity has been observed at 65 °C, but it is completely inactivated at 80 °C.

The thin mycelial suspensions formed by the fungus make it desirable for use in the production of stable lipase for manufacturing detergents for hot water machine washing.

The immobilization of Thermomyces lanuginosus lipase (TLL) or other lipases on diverse supports utilizing a variety of immobilization techniques has been investigated in scientific literature with the aim of enhancing enzyme stability, reusability, and performance in various biocatalytic applications, such as biodiesel production and ester synthesis. These outcomes highlight the potential of immobilized lipases for industrial-scale applications in the food, beverage, and biofuel sectors, as they offer environmentally friendly and sustainable alternatives for diverse chemical transformations.

==== Amylase ====
α-amylase is a dimeric enzyme that can hydrolyse starch, amylose, and amylopectin, but not maltose The α-amylase of T. lanuginosis is most active at slightly acidic conditions and a temperature of 65 °C. At 100 °C it is inactivated by self-association of subunits, converting it to an inactive trimeric species. The enzyme is able to withstand otherwise lethal temperatures and then return to native state with full enzymatic activity, which allows the fungus to survive fluctuating high and low temperatures.

==== Xylanase ====
Xylan is the most abundant structural polysaccharide in nature other than cellulose, and is broken down through many enzymes, including xylanase. The xylanase of T. lanuginosus is a polypeptide of 225 amino acids and is highly homologous with other xylanases, but it differs due to the presence of a disulfide bridge that most mesophilic xylanases do not have, and its increased density of charged residues throughout the protein. This makes starch degrading enzymes of T. lanuginosus the most thermostable enzymes among fungal sources. While the temperature optima of most xylanases range from 55 to 65 °C, xylanases of some strains of T. lanuginosus are optimally active at 70 to 80 °C.The xylanase is even stable to denaturants such as urea, and has the ability to refold after denaturing.

Xylanases have found applications in the food, animal feed, and pulp and paper industries as they can be used to breakdown xylan in industrial enzymatic reactions.

==== Phytase ====
The phytase of T. lanuginosus has optimum activity at 65 °C and a pH of 6.0. Differential scanning calorimetry has shown that high temperature (69 °C) is required to unfold it.

Phytic acid is the primary storage form of phosphate in cereal, legumes, and oilseeds. These are the main components of animal feed, but monogastric animals and humans are unable to digest phytate completely and do not benefit from the phosphate. Extra phosphorus needs to be added into feed to desphosphorylate the phytic acid because it forms insoluble complexes with some metal ions, making them unavailable for nutrition. There is therefore an interest in the use of phytases to break down the phytic acid and avoid this extra step.

==== Chitinase ====
Four putative chitinase encoding genes have been identified in T. lanuginosus. Chitinases are glycosyl hydrolases that break down the β-1,4 linkages of chitin. They are active over broad pH (3.0–11.0) and temperature (30–60◦C) range.

Chitinases are biologically useful because they break down the biopolymer chitin. Chitin poses a severe environmental problem in the form of chitinous waste, which is produced at up to 100 billion metric tonnes annually. They can be used in the degradation of chitin in crude shrimp shells without pre-treatment with harsh chemicals, and also have applications in medicine as chitinase has been found to have antifungal properties.

==== Glucoamylase ====
Thermomyces lanuginosus also produced glucoamylase. It has suggested usefulness in the commercial production of glucose syrups because it is insensitive to end product inhibition.

==== Trehalase ====
Trehalase is a monomeric glycoprotein with 20% carbohydrate content. It is optimally active at 50 °C. It is produced constitutively in T. lanuginosus, but is strongly bound to the hyphal wall.

==== Invertase ====
Thermomyces lanuginosus has a very unstable invertase that can be stabilized by thiols in the lab and inactivated by thiol-modifying compound, suggesting it is a thiol protein.

=== Adaptations for survival ===
Thermomyces lanuginosus has a number of adaptations for survival, including homeoviscous adaptation. The concentration of linoleic acid is twofold higher at 30 °C than at 50 °C, meaning it can adjust the fatty acid composition of its membrane in response to temperature to vary the fluidity and keep its enzymes functioning optimally. It can also gain thermotolerance - conidia that are heat shocked show enhanced survival at higher temperatures.

== Habitat and ecology ==
Thermophilic fungi are primarily compost fungi, though T. lanuginosus has also been found to thrive in spoil tips, senescent grass leaves, sewage, and peat and bog soils, and is the dominant species of thermophilic fungi in hot springs. Though it is sometimes found in soil, this is not a natural habitat for T. lanuginosus, and the concentration of spores of thermophilic fungi per gram material is approximately 10^{6} higher in composts than soils. It is proposed that their wide presence in soil is due to dispersal of spores elsewhere and fallout from air.

Thermomyces lanuginosus has two of the most important qualities required for being a compost colonizer - it is able to withstand high temperatures and use complex carbon sources for energy. It produces thermostable hemicellulases that degrade hemicellulose of plant biomass into simpler sugars. As the temperature in compost systems rises, the pioneer flora disappears and thermophilic fungi become dominant. Exothermic reactions of saprophytic and mesophilc microflora raise the temperature to 40 °C, which causes thermophilic spores to germinate and eventually outgrow pioneers, raising the temperature even higher to 60 °C. Around the end of decomposition, thermophilic fungi compose 50-70% of compost microbial biomass. T. lanuginosus is a secondary sugar fungus and can participate in mutualistic relationships with some true cellulose decomposers of composts.

== Uses of Thermomyces lanuginosus Lipase (TLL) ==
Thermomyces lanuginosus Lipase (TLL) has a number of different chemical, environmental, and industrial applications, where hydrolytic processes are involved. Its regiospecificity allows the oleochemical industry to produce products such as cocoa butter equivalents, human milk fat substitutes, and other specific-structured lipids. It can be used for hydrolysis of oils and fats, alcoholysis or transesterifications of oils and fats, esterification of fatty acids, and acidolysis and interesterification of oils.

The first commercialized lipase to be used in detergents was Lipolase, a fungal lipase initially derived from T. lanuginosus. Lipases help the capability of detergent by removing stains. Lipolases have also been used in ionic liquids - environmentally attractive alternatives to typical organic solvents.

TLL has many uses in organic chemistry, such in resolution of racemic mixtures, and creation of supercritical fluids. Large scale environmental applications include use in the degradation of polymers, treatment of wastewater from the meat industry, pretreatment of wool, and a sensor of fat quality in large scale processing. The lipase has been found to be useful in the production of drugs and drug intermediates, such as anti-tumour agents, because it can help bring about kinetic resolutions of synthetically important chiral building blocks. It also has applications in the petroleum industry as it can be used in the production of biodiesel.

== Pathology ==
Endocarditis caused by the fungus has been reported in humans, but is very rare. The first report of T. lanuginosus endocarditis was made postmortem over 25 years ago in a patient who had prior valvular surgery for Staphylococcus aureus infective endocarditis, where it remained asymptomatic for more than 6 months. Another case was reported in an otherwise immunocompetent patient who had a prosthetic heart valve inserted following bacterial endocarditis. T. lanuginosus endocarditis was most likely the result of contamination during that surgery. In the latter case, the illness lasted 9 years and was treated with aggressive surgery and voriconaozle therapy.

Risk factors for mould endocarditis include pre-existing lesions, valvular heart disease, prior cardiac surgery (such as valvular surgery, coronary artery bypass grafting, pacemaker or defibrillator insertion and surgery of the aorta) immunosuppression including pregnancy and prematurity, intravenous drug abuse, and having intravenous lines. Symptoms at presentation may include fever, chills, cardiac failure, neurological symptoms including weakness, confusion and visual impairment, respiratory symptoms, skin lesions, chest pain, leg pain, back pain and constitutional symptoms such as anorexia, malaise and weight loss. Fungal endocarditis is fatal without treatment. It has a high morbidity and mortality, as well as a potential for relapse, so patients with uncommon non-Aspergillus mould endocarditis may require lifelong suppressive antifungal therapy.
