= Keepers: The Key of Life =

- Platform: Microsoft Windows
- Release: 25 April 2007 year
- Genres: Adventure, Action, Puzzle

Keepers: Key of Life (in Russia was released under title Хранители: Ключ жизни) is a 2007 year Russian anime-style videogame by FalcorMedia, built by an internal gaming engine for PC.

Presented at the KRI 2006, it is a three-dimensional game with anime-style graphics. The game features a branching narrative based on the player's choices. The developers noted that the same outcomes can be achieved in multiple ways, depending on the player's perspective.

== Plot ==
The game takes place on the island of Idyll where there exists the Key to Life.

== Development and release ==
The game was created by the Moscow-based start-up FalcorMedia. As of April 2006 year, the developers were in talks with publishers and planning publication for the third quarter of that year. By April 16, the developers had not yet found a publisher, but were optimistic. The game was released on 25 April 2007 year (full version), but part of game was released 12 April.

In November 2006, the developer presented the game at the Igromir exhibition.

After the release of the game, the developers planned to release a book based on the events of the game.

== Critical reception ==
Megaobzor felt the developers were inspired by Miyozaki. Igromania commented on the game's "vibrant" designs and simple puzzles. Ranma Spb thought parents would like the unusual plot. Absolute Games gave the title an "awful" rating.
