= Keep (surname) =

Keep is a surname. Notable people with the surname include:

- Albert Keep (1826–1907), American railroad financier
- Angela Keep (born 1981), Australian actress
- Henry Keep (American football) (1872–1965), American football player
- Henry Keep (businessman) (1818-1869), American banker and railroader
- Henry Keep (politician) (1863–1905), Australian politician
- Jason Keep (born 1978), American basketball player
- Judith Keep (1944–2004), American judge
- John Keep (1781–1870), American trustee of Oberlin College
- Nathan Cooley Keep (1800–1875), American dentistry pioneer
- Robert Porter Keep (1844–1904), American teacher
