= Keep (app) =

Chinese mobile fitness app

Keep Inc.
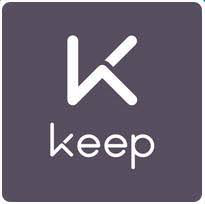
- Traded as: SEHK: 3650
- Headquarters: Chaoyang District, Beijing, China
- Website: keep.com

Keep is a Chinese mobile fitness app. The app was made available for downloading on 4 February 2015. Keep was developed by the company Beijing Calories Technology, which was founded by the college student Wang Ning.

The app allows users to view fitness videos and to buy fitness equipment. It contains a social networking service so that customers can share exercise routines with each other. Keep reached one million users downloads by 105 days after its launch and had over 200 million users in September 2019.

== History ==
Keep is an app created by the company Beijing Calories Technology Co Ltd which was founded in 2014 by Wang Ning, a college student in his fourth year. Wang said his motivation for creating the app stemmed from his losing 20 kilograms (44 lb) after he developed an exercise regimen through online research. He chose the name "Keep" because according to Xinhua News Agency, "he believes keeping, or persistence, is the core of losing weight and starting up a company".

Keep became available for downloading on 4 February 2015. More than one million users downloaded the app by the 105th day after its launch. Keep provides users with fitness videos and an e-commerce store where they can buy exercise equipment through WeChat Pay and Alipay. The app contains a social networking service that allows users to upload images of what they have eaten, what they look like, and what their exercise routines are. It lets users monitor where and for how long they have run. Its GPS feature allows users to find nearby joggers who are also using the app to whom they can direct friend requests. To make users more committed, it uses "daily bonus, self-evaluation, and [a] personalized fitness plan recommendation".

Keep received US$10 million in Series B funding from GGV Capital and US$32 million in Series C funding from Morningside Ventures and GGV Capital, with participation from Bertelsmann Asia Investments. In March 2018, Keep opened a gym in Beijing, its first. China has 11 Keep-owned gyms, called Keepland, with nine located in Beijing and two in Shanghai. The company opened the brick-and-mortar gyms with the goal of nurturing brand loyalty by having online users start in-person relationships.

In July 2018, it received $126 million in Series D funding from Goldman Sachs, Tencent, GGV Capital, and Morningside Venture Capital. As China was experiencing economic deceleration, Keep in October 2019 laid off 15% of its workforce after having increased it by fourfold in 2018. When Apple Inc. CEO Tim Cook travelled to China on 21 March 2017, he visited Keep's office in Beijing and praised the company for reaching 80 million downloads. Keep is installed by default on devices in Apple Stores in China and was on Apple's "2015 Best of App Store list".

In 2019, the company had 800 employees. By September 2019, Keep had reached 200 million users. In 2019, the app has 18 non-Chinese-language versions and has 10 million users who are not based in China. English, German, Japanese, and Spanish are several of the app's supported languages. Keep's four streams of revenue are sporting goods, advertising, its Keepland gyms, and app membership. By 2019, it had made over one billion sales in sporting goods and ranked fourth in the sporting goods category on the online retail website Tmall behind Decathlon, Lululemon Athletica, and Yijian Running Machine. A December 2018 report published by Sootoo Institute found that there were 38.8 million downloads of Keep between July and September, making it "the most downloaded fitness app in China".

== Reception ==
All Tech Asia journalist Runmiao Diao wrote a 2016 article titled "Why I ditched China's No. 1 fitness app 'Keep' and went back to the gym". She found that the app's large number of options in what courses provided her an environment of overchoice. After her friends followed her on Keep, Diao spent time browsing through what fitness activities they chose to do, which consumed more time. She said that despite spending a substantial amount of time on looking at exercises, she remained uncertain about which exercise to do. Diao lamented, "Keep was not able to tell me either, and I was still left to CHOOSE". She found that after doing Keep's fitness activities, "I did not feel that my fitness has made any improvement", so she chose to join a gym with instructors who could guide her if she made any mistakes.

Research firm CB Insights wrote in a 2017 report that "Many fitness mobile apps offer convenience, but Keep has differentiated itself by integrating social media and e-commerce within its app. The app's social media component not only allows fitness enthusiasts to post their own content, but also allows fitness brands to create in-app social campaigns and promotions for fitness classes and other services." In analysing the company's layoffs, a 2019 Sina Corp article determined that users have installed and uninstalled the app multiple times and purchased classes and memberships but then not used the services more than several times. The article concluded that "the embarrassment of Keep is obvious: it is difficult for novice users to persevere; users with basic training have more professional needs after advancing, but the app cannot really meet those needs".
