= Keeper (surname) =

Keeper is a surname. Notable people with the surname include:

- Brady Keeper (born 1996), Canadian ice hockey defenseman
- Cyril Keeper (born 1943), Canadian politician
- Joe Keeper (1886–1971), Canadian long-distance runner
- Tina Keeper (born 1962), Canadian activist, actress and politician
- Tilly Keeper (born 1997), British actress
