= Keeper: Living with Nancy =

2009 book by Andrea Gillies

- Author: Andrea Gillies
- Language: English
- Genre: Memoir / Health
- Publisher: Short Books
- Publication date: May 7, 2009
- Publication place: United Kingdom
- Pages: 256
- ISBN: 1-906021-65-1

Keeper: Living with Nancy is a 2009 biographical book written by Andrea Gillies which centers around Alzheimer's disease. It won the Wellcome Book Prize and Orwell Prize.

== Plot ==
The book is the account of Andrea Gillies' mother-in-law, Nancy, who had been diagnosed with Alzheimer's. It follows how Gillies and her family care for her during her illness while also managing their house, a 22-room B&B. It also describes how Nancy changes and how it affects the family.

== Awards ==
- 2009 Wellcome Book Prize
- 2010 Orwell Prize
