= List of barley cultivars =

Barley is a cereal grain and a major commercial crop, with many cultivars.

== Cultivars ==
- 'Azure', a six-row, blue-aleurone malting barley released in 1982, it was high-yielding with strong straw, but was susceptible to loose smut.
- 'Beacon', a six-row malting barley with rough awns, short rachilla hairs and colorless aleurone, it was released in 1973, and was the first North Dakota State University barley that had resistance to loose smut.
- Bere, a six-row barley, is currently cultivated mainly on 5-15 hectares of land in Orkney, Scotland. Two additional parcels on the island of Islay, Scotland, were planted in 2006 for Bruichladdich Distillery.
- 'Betzes', an old German two-row barley, was introduced into North America from Kraków, Poland, by the United States Department of Agriculture. The Montana and Idaho agricultural experiment stations released Betzes in 1957. It is a midshort, medium strength-strawed, midseason-maturing barley. It has a midsize-to-large kernels with yellow aleurones. Betzes is susceptible to loose and covered smuts, rusts, and scald.
- 'Bowman', a two-rowed, smooth-awned variety, was jointly released by NDSU and USDA in 1984 as a feed barley, spring variety developed in North Dakota. It has good test weight and straw strength. It is resistant to wheat stem rust, but is susceptible to loose smut and barley yellow dwarf virus.
- 'Celebration', a variety developed by the barley breeding program at Busch Agricultural Resources, was released in 2008. Through a collaborative agreement between the NDSU Foundation Seedstocks (NDFSS) project and Busch Agricultural Resources, all foundation seed of 'Celebration' barley will be produced and distributed by the NDFSS. 'Celebration' has excellent agronomic performance and malt quality. It is a Midwestern variety, well-adapted for Minnesota, North Dakota, Idaho, and Montana, with medium-early maturity, medium-early heading, medium-short height, mid-lax head type, rough awns, short rachilla hairs, and colorless aleurone, moderately resistant to Septoria and net blotch. It has improved reaction to Fusarium head blight and consistently lower DON content.
- 'Centennial', a Canadian variety, was developed from the cross of 'Lenta' x 'Sanalta' by the University of Alberta. It is a two-row, relatively short, stiff-strawed, late-maturing variety. The kernel is midlong with yellow aleurone. It was released as a feed barley.

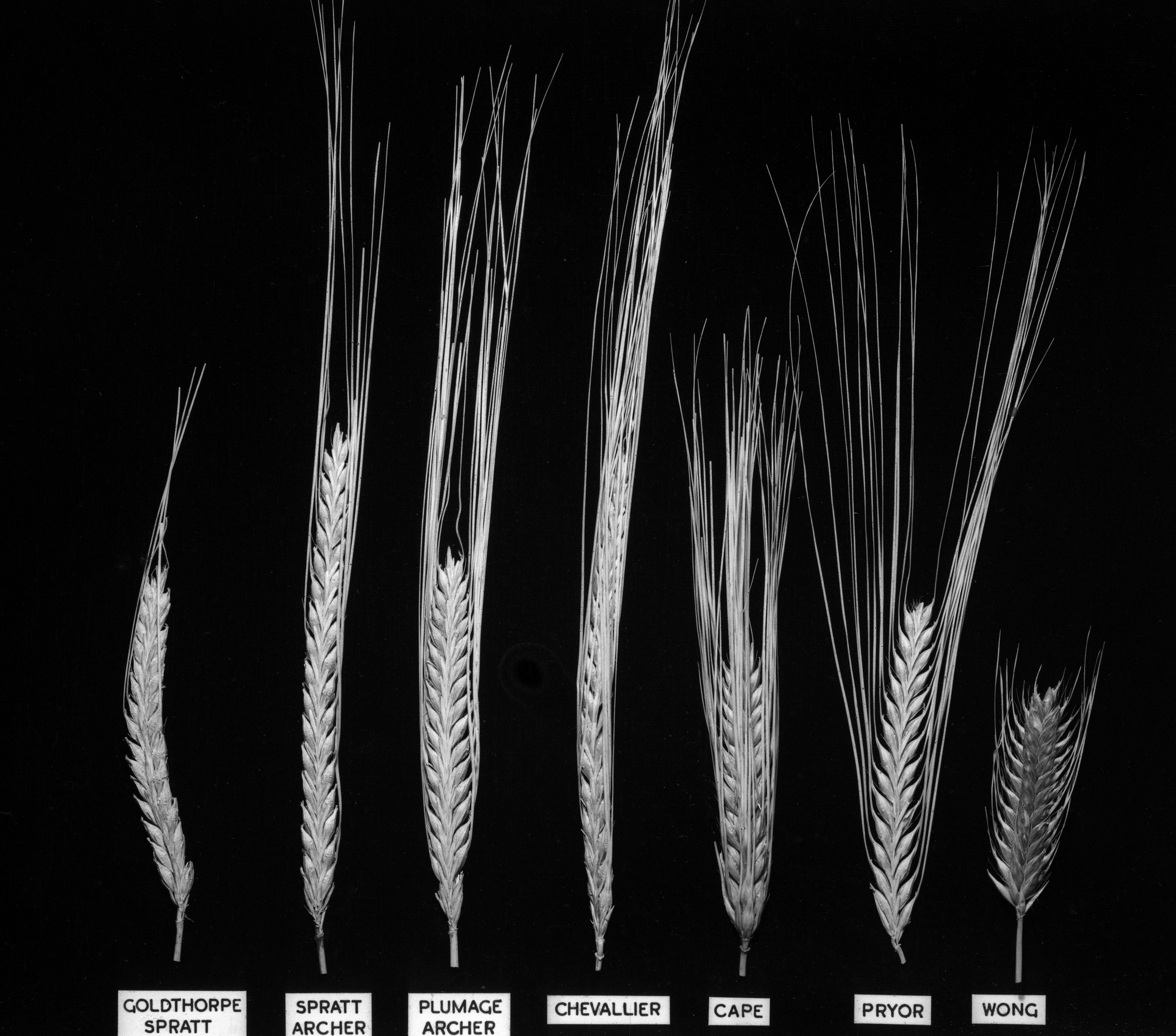
Seven mid-20th-century malting varieties studied at Canterbury Agricultural College

- 'Compana', an American variety, was developed from a composite cross by the Idaho and Montana Agricultural Experiment Stations in cooperation with the USDA's Plant Science Research Division. It was released by Montana in 1941. 'Compana' is a two-row variety with moderately weak straw, midshort with midseason maturity. The kernels are long and wide with yellow aleurone. This variety is resistant to loose smut and moderately resistant to covered smut.
- 'Conlon', a two-row barley, was released by NDSU in 1996. Test weight and yield are better than 'Bowman'. Yield is equal to 'Stark'. 'Conlon' heads earlier than 'Bowman' and shows good heat tolerance by kernel plumpness. It is resistant to powdery mildew and net blotch, but is moderately susceptible to spot blotch. It is prone to lodging under high-yield growing conditions. It appears best adapted to western North Dakota and adjacent western states.
- 'Diamant', a Czech high-yield, is a short-height, mutant variety created with X-rays.
- 'Dickson', a six-row, rough-awned variety, was released by NDSU in 1965. It had good straw strength and was resistant to stem rust, but susceptible to loose smut. 'Dickson' had more resistance to prevalent leaf spot diseases than 'Trophy', 'Larker', and 'Traill'. It was similar to 'Trophy' in heading date, plant height, and straw strength. It had less plumpness than 'Trophy' and 'Larker', but more than 'Traill' and 'Kindred'.
- 'Drummond', a six-row malting variety, was released by NDSU in 2000. It has white aleurone, long rachilla hairs and semismooth awns. 'Drummond' has better straw strength than current six-row varieties. Heading date is similar to Robust and plant height is similar to Stander. It is resistant to spot blotch and moderately susceptible to net blotch. However, its net blotch resistance is better than any current variety. Fusarium head blight reaction is similar to that of 'Robust'. It is resistant to prevalent races of wheat stem rust, but is susceptible to pathotype Pgt-QCC. 'Drummond' is on the American Malting Barley Association's list of recommended varieties. In two years of plant-scale evaluation, 'Drummond' was found satisfactory by Anheuser-Busch, Inc. and Miller Brewing.
- 'Excel', a six-row, white-aleurone malting barley, was released by Minnesota in 1990. Shorter in height than other six-row barleys grown at that time, it is high-yielding with medium-early maturity, moderately strong straw, smooth awns, and long rachilla hairs. It has high resistance to stem rust and moderate resistance to spot blotch, but is susceptible to loose smut. Malting traits are equal or greater than 'Morex' with plum kernel percentage lower than 'Robust'.
- 'Foster', a six-row, white-aleurone malting barley, was released by NDSU in 1995. About one day earlier and slightly shorter than 'Robust', it is higher-yielding than 'Morex', 'Robust', and 'Hazen'. Straw strength is similar to 'Excel' and 'Stander', but better than 'Robust'. It is moderately susceptible to net blotch, but resistant to spot blotch. Protein is 1.5% lower than 'Robust' and 'Morex'.
- 'Glenn', a six-row, white-aleurone variety, was released by NDSU in 1978. 'Glenn' was resistant to prevalent races of loose and covered smut with better resistance to leaf spot diseases than 'Larker'. It matured about two days earlier than 'Larker' and yielded about 10% more than 'Larker' and 'Beacon'.
- 'Golden Promise', a British two-row semi-dwarf, is a salt-tolerant, mutant variety created with gamma radiation used to make beer and whisky.
- 'Hazen', a six-row, smooth-awn, white-aleurone feed barley, was released by NDSU in 1984. 'Hazen' heads two days later than 'Glenn'. It is susceptible to loose smut.
- Highland barley is a crop cultivated on the Tibetan Plateau.
- 'Kindred' was released in 1941 and developed from a selection made by S.T. Lykken, a Kindred, North Dakota farmer. It was a six-row, rough-awned, medium-early Manchurian-type malting variety that gave good yields. 'Kindred' had stem rust resistance, but was moderately susceptible to spot blotch and Septoria. It was less susceptible to blight and root rot than 'Wisconsin 38'. It was medium-height with weak straw.
- 'Kindred L' is a reselection made to eliminate blue Manchurian types.
- 'Larker', a six-rowed, semi-smooth-awn malting barley, was first released in 1961. It was medium-maturity with moderate straw strength and medium height. 'Larker' was rust-resistant, but susceptible to leaf diseases and loose smut. It was superior to all other malt varieties for kernel plumpness at the time of release.
- 'Logan', released by NDSU in 1995, is classed as a nonmalting barley. It is a white-aleurone, two-row barley similar to 'Bowman' in heading date and plant height and similar to 'Morex' for foliar diseases. It has better yield, test weight, and lodging score, and lower protein, than 'Bowman' and 'Morex'.
- 'Lux' is a Danish variety.
- 'Manchurian', a blue-aleurone malting variety, was released by NDSU in 1922. It had weak to moderate-stiff straw and was susceptible to stem rust. It was developed from false stripe virus-free stock.
- 'Manscheuri', also designated 'Accession No. 871', is a six-row barley that may have been first released by NDSU before 1904. It outyielded most of the common types being grown in North Dakota at the time. It had stiffer straw than varieties at the time and a longer head filled with large, plump kernels.
- 'Mansury', also designated 'Accession No. 172', is a two-row barley first released by NDSU about 1905.
- 'Maris Otter' is an English two-row winter variety commonly used in the production of malt for traditional British beers or as a 'maltier' two-row substitute in any style. It remains popular for craft beer and among homebrewers.
- 'Morex', a six-row, white-aleurone, smooth-awn malting variety, was released by Minnesota in 1978. 'Morex', which stands for "more extract", is highly resistant to stem rust, moderate to spot blotch, and susceptible to loose smut.
- 'Nordal', a spring nutans variety from Carlsberg Sweden, was released in 1971.
- 'Nordic', a six-row, colorless-aleurone feed barley, was released in 1971. It had rough awns and short rachilla hairs. Yield was similar to 'Dickson', but greater than 'Larker'. Kernel plumpness and test weight was superior to 'Dickson', but less than 'Larker'. Lodging, spot, and net blotch resistance was similar to 'Dickson', but it had higher resistance to Septoria leaf blotch. It showed less leaf rust symptoms compared to other varieties at the time.
- 'Optic', Britain's most widely grown spring malting cultivar during the mid-2000s.
- 'Pallas'
- 'Park', a six-row, white-aleurone, malting barley, was released in 1978. 'Park' had better resistance to leaf spot diseases, spot blotch, net blotch, and Septoria leaf blotch than 'Larker'.
- 'Plumage Archer' is an English malt variety.
- 'Pearl'
- 'Pinnacle', a variety released by the North Dakota Agricultural Experiment Station in 2006, has high yield, low protein, long rachilla hairs, smooth awns, white aleurone, medium-late maturity, medium height, and strong straw strength.
- 'Proctor' is a parent cultivar of 'Maris Otter'.
- 'Pioneer' is a parent cultivar of 'Maris Otter'.
- 'Rawson', a variety developed by the NDSU Barley Breeding Program, was released by the North Dakota Agricultural Experiment Station in 2005. 'Rawson's' general characteristics were very large kernels, loose hull, long rachilla hairs, rough awns, white aleurone, medium maturity, medium height, and medium straw strength.
- 'Robust', a six-row, white-aleurone malting variety, was released by Minnesota in 1983. Maturity is two days later than 'Morex'.
- 'Sioux', a selection from Tregal released by NDSU, was a six-row, medium-early variety with white aleurone, rough awns, and long rachilla hairs. It was high-yielding with plump kernels. Its disease reaction was similar to 'Tregal'.
- 'Stark', a two-row nonmalting barley released by NDSU in 1991, has stiff straw and large kernels, and appears best adapted to western North Dakota and adjacent western states. 'Stark' is about one day later and two inches shorter than 'Bowman', with equal or better test weight. 'Stark' yields about 10% better than 'Bowman'. It is moderately resistant to net and spot blotch, but is susceptible to loose smut, leaf rust and the QCC race of wheat stem rust.
- 'Steptoe', a white-kerneled, rough-awned feed variety, was released by Washington State University in 1973. 'Steptoe' is widely adapted and has been one of the highest yielding and most popular six-rowed feed varieties in the inland Pacific northwest for many years.
- 'Tradition', a variety with excellent agronomic performance and malt quality, is well-adapted to Minnesota, North Dakota, Idaho, and Montana. 'Tradition' has medium relative maturity, medium-short height, and very strong straw. It has a nodding head type, semismooth awns, long rachilla hairs. and white aleurone.
- 'Traill', a medium-early, rough-awn, white-aleurone malting variety, was released by NDSU in 1956. It was resistant to stem rust and had the same reaction to spot blotch and Septoria as 'Kindred'. 'Traill' had greater yield and straw strength than 'Kindred', but had smaller kernel size.
- 'Tregal', a high-yield, smooth-awn, six-row feed barley, was released by NDSU in 1943. It was medium-early with short, stiff straw, erect head, and high resistance to loose smut. 'Tregal' was similar to 'Kindred' for reaction to spot blotch with similar tolerance to Septoria.
- 'Trophy', a six-row, rough-awn malting variety with colorless aleurone, was released by NDSU in 1964. Similar to 'Traill' and 'Kindred' in plant height, heading date, and test weight, it had a higher percentage of plump kernels. Its yield in North Dakota was greater than 'Kindred' and similar to 'Traill'. Similar to 'Kindred' and 'Traill', it was resistant to stem rust, but susceptible to loose smut and Septoria leaf blotch. It had some field resistance to net blotch. It had greater straw strength than 'Kindred'. 'Trophy' had greater enzymatic activity and quality than 'Traill'.
- 'Windich' is a Western Australian grain cultivar named after Tommy Windich (circa 1840–1876).
- 'Yagan' is a Western Australian grain cultivar named after Yagan (circa 1795–1833).
