= Farinetta =

Brand of buckwheat flour

Farinetta is type of buckwheat flour. The name is a registered trademark owned by Minn-Dak Growers, Ltd.

Farinetta is made from a mixture of the aleurone layer of the hulled seed and the seed embryo and contains about 35% protein, compared to about 12% in the whole grain.
