= GM Crops & Food =

- Discipline: Agricultural biotechnology
- Language: English
- Edited by: Naglaa A. Abdallah; Channapatna S. Prakash

Publication details
- Former name(s): GM Crops
- History: 2010–present
- Publisher: Taylor & Francis
- Frequency: Quarterly
- Impact factor: 3.074 (2020)

Standard abbreviations
- ISO 4: GM Crops Food

Indexing
- ISSN: 2164-5698 (print); 2164-5701 (web)
- LCCN: 2011202531
- OCLC no.: 910924415

Links
- Journal homepage; Online access; Online archive

GM Crops & Food: Biotechnology in Agriculture and the Food Chain is a quarterly peer-reviewed scientific journal covering agricultural and food biotechnology. It was established in 2010 as GM Crops, obtaining its current name in 2012. It is published by Taylor & Francis and the editors-in-chief are Naglaa A. Abdallah (Cairo University) and Channapatna S. Prakash (Tuskegee University). According to the Journal Citation Reports, the journal has a 2017 impact factor of 2.913.
