= Gamma irradiation =

Gamma irradiation is exposure to ionizing radiation with gamma rays. It may also refer to the following processes in particular:

- Ionizing radiation sterilization
- Food irradiation
- Gamma knife, used in radiosurgery
