= Forash =

Food crop

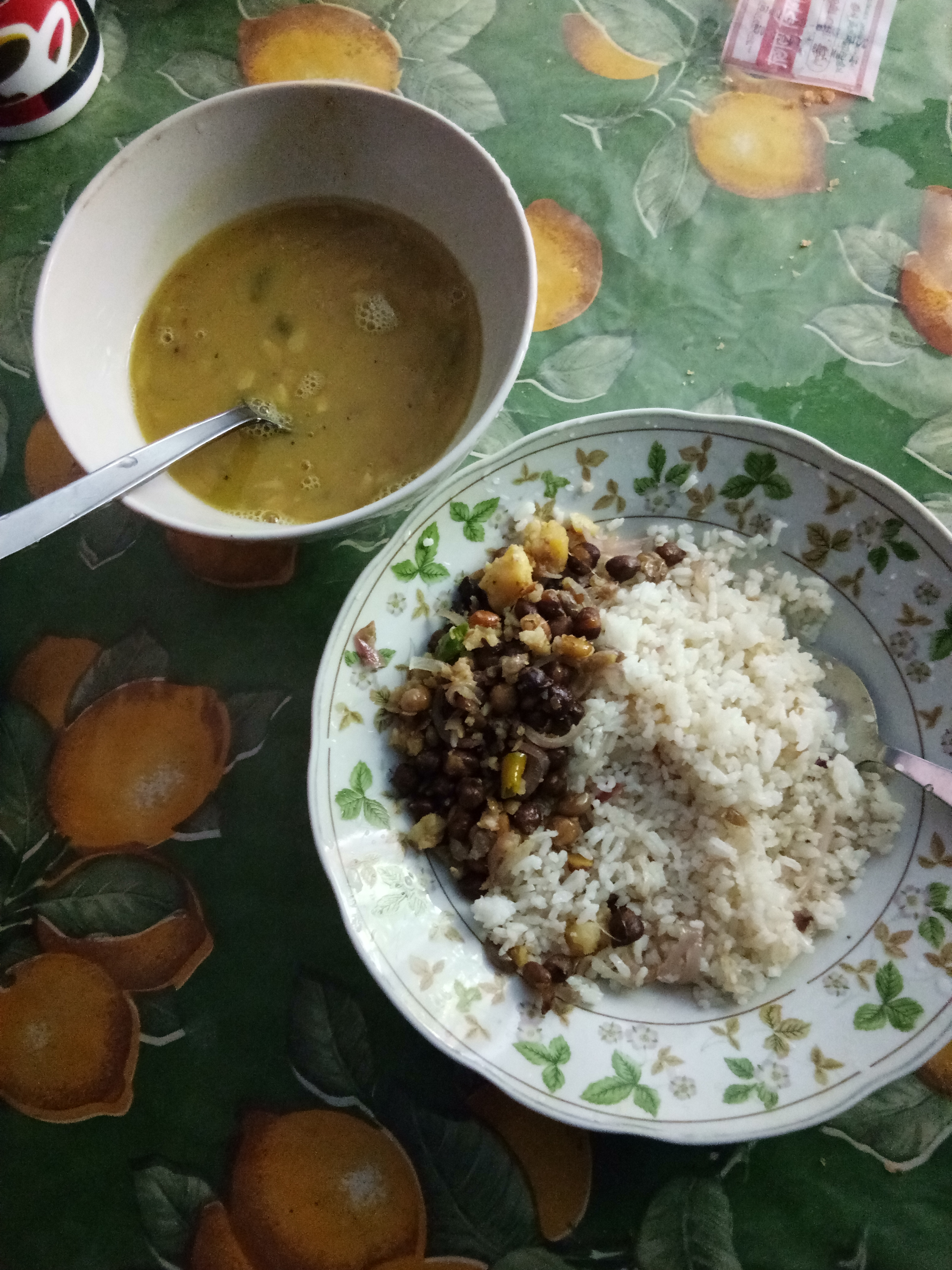
- Biran bhaat & Forashor Dail, a traditional Sylheti breakfast
- Alternative names: Forash bisi
- Course: main dish
- Place of origin: Bangladesh
- Region or state: Sylhet
- Main ingredients: onion, oil and turmeric

Forash (Sylheti: ꠚꠞꠣꠡ) is a leguminous winter crop often featured in Sylheti cuisine It is a kind of French bean, hence the name "Forash" which means French in Sylheti. As a vegetable, it is similar to beans. Raw Forash is cooked as a vegetable, though the main part is its seeds. Forash is usually cooked with fish and meat. It is served with cooked rice and roti.

== History ==
Forash first came to Sylhet from France. This is why it is called Forash in Sylheti language. This vegetable is grown well in the alluvium soil of Sylhet. Because of its popularity among the worldwide Sylhetis, it is exported to several countries including England, America and Canada.
