= George Douglas Hutton Bell =

English plant breeder

George Douglas Hutton Bell CBE FRS (18 October 1905 – 27 June 1993) was an English plant breeder who was director of the Plant Breeding Institute from 1947 to 1971. He bred Proctor, the first winter barley variety in the UK, and Maris Otter, still favoured by contemporary real ale brewers. He was appointed CBE in the 1965 New Year Honours, and awarded the first Mullard Award in 1967 "for the contribution the Proctor barley bred by him had made to agricultural production in the United Kingdom".
