= Radicidation =

Irradiation of food for enhanced preservation and extended shelf life

Radicidation is a specific case of food irradiation where the dose of ionizing radiation applied to the food is sufficient to reduce the number of viable specific non-spore-forming pathogenic bacteria to such a level that none are detectable when the treated food is examined by any recognized method. The required dose is in the range of 2 – 8 kGy. The term may also be applied to the destruction of parasites such as tapeworm and trichina in meat, in which case the required dose is in the range of 0.1 – 1 kGy. When the process is used specifically for destroying enteropathogenic and enterotoxinogenic organisms belonging to the genus Salmonella, it is referred to as Salmonella radicidation.

The term Radicidation is derived from radiation and 'caedere' (Latin for fell, cut, kill).

== See also ==
- Radappertization
- Radurization
