= Golden Promise =

Semi-dwarf cultivar of barley bred for malt

Golden Promise is a variety of spring-sown two-row barley. It was developed in the 1950s by exposing an existing variety to gamma radiation with the aim of producing a semi-dwarf variety of barley that had good malting characteristics. It became very popular with farmers during the 1970s but began to be replaced by higher yielding varieties in the 1980s. Due to its perceived better flavour than these more modern varieties, a niche market was maintained and it is still favoured by craft brewers. It has been used by researchers to study the genetics of barley and to investigate the effect of barley on the flavour of beer.

== Development ==
Golden Promise was developed in the 1950s by breeding company Miln Marsters who aimed to produce a semi-dwarf variety of barley that had good malting characteristics. Seed of the traditional variety Maythorpe was irradiated with gamma radiation to produce mutants with altered genes and 14,000 lines were grown in 1958 to assess their stature and agronomic properties. The best lines were then selected over several years and entered into official testing between 1962 and 1964. Farmers were initially sceptical about the variety due to its appearance but it was first grown commercially in Scotland in 1967 and performed well, producing high yields and grain suitable for malting. It was placed on the recommended list for Scotland in 1968 and by 1977, 70% of the spring barley grown in Scotland was Golden Promise. The area planted with Golden Promise declined during the 1980s and from a peak of 81,900 hectares (202,000 acres) in 1981, less than 2,000 hectares (4,900 acres) were grown annually during the 1990s.

== Malting ==
The short dormancy of the seed and uniform grain size make Golden Promise ideal for malting and it was used widely by the brewing and distilling industries in the UK and Ireland during the 1960s and 1970s. During the 1980s the variety was nearing the end of its commercial lifespan, but it was still popular with breweries such as Timothy Taylor Brewery who used it in their Landlord beer. Consequently the Chairman of Simpsons Malt, Simon Simpson purchased a farm in 1983 to ensure the continued supply of Golden Promise and in 2015 the company acquired the plant variety rights.

In 1999, Caledonian Brewery signed a deal with Simpsons to have the exclusive rights to use the barley to brew their Deuchar beers. Caledonian also produced a beer called Golden Promise named after the variety and which was the UK's first organic beer and the first organic ale available in the US. By 1999 the brewery could not obtain sufficient quantities of Golden Promise so the beer was not brewed using the variety. For producing whisky, The Macallan distillery had exclusive rights but gradually reduced the proportion it used, replacing it with higher yielding varieties. By 1994 the variety was in decline but was still favoured by small brewers due to perceived differences in flavour compared to more modern varieties. During the 2010s, the variety was held in a similar regard by brewers to Maris Otter, a winter-sown variety of barley which was bred in the 1960s.

Although the variety of barley was considered by brewers to influence the flavour of beer, there was little scientific evidence. To investigate, during the 2010s researchers crossed Golden Promise and Full Pint to produce a population of barley genotypes, some of which were also grown in different environments and they were used to produce hundreds of beers. The study confirmed that barley variety influenced beer flavour and was more influential than the growing environment. Further, they found that malting quality was unrelated to flavour so breeding programs concentrating on malting quality will not necessarily produce varieties with good flavour. Further research investigated the genetic basis of the differences in flavour.

== Genetics ==
The semi-dwarf nature of Golden Promise is controlled by the ari-e.GP gene located on chromosome 7. In the 1990s it was discovered by accident that the semi-dwarf gene also conveys salt tolerance. Golden Promise was used as a parent to produce other varieties including Midas, Goldfield, Goldmarker and Goldspear but these were not commercially successful. As of 2015 contemporary semi-dwarf varieties mostly contain the sdw1 gene from Diamant, itself created through x-ray irradiation.

The variety is frequently used in genetic research on barley as it is relatively easy to genetically transform due to the shoots regrowing easily from the callus. As a result of the widespread use of Golden Promise in barley research, its genome was sequenced and a reference assembly was released in 2020.

== Agronomic properties ==
The semi-dwarf trait made the variety more resistant to lodging than older varieties and it was also earlier-maturing, two traits which aided harvesting. Golden Promise typically yields 4.5 tonnes per hectare (4,000 pounds per acre) which is one third lower than modern varieties of barley as of 2021. Farmers receive a premium price to compensate for the reduced yield. It is very susceptible to powdery mildew.
