= Muriel Howorth =

Writer and atomic advocate

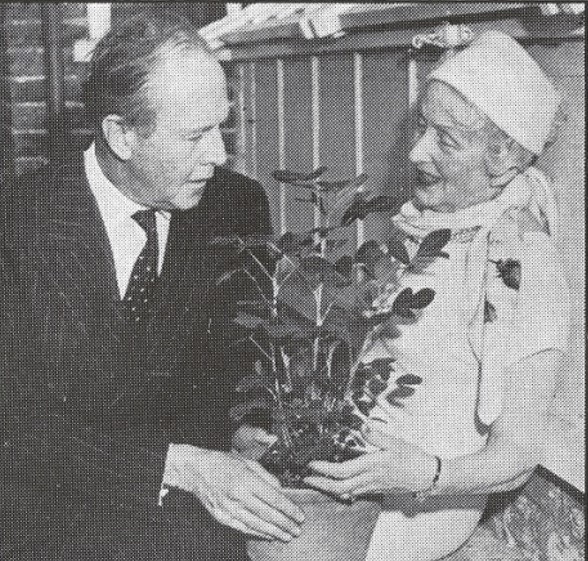
- Howorth shows popular garden writer Beverly Nichols a two-foot-high peanut plant grown from an irradiated nut planted in her own backyard
- Born: Muriel Kathleen Edgar; 1886; Bishop Auckland
- Died: 1971

Muriel Howorth (1887-1971) was the English founder of the Atomic Gardening Society, author, and atomic gardening advocate.

== Biography ==
Howorth was born in Bishop Auckland in 1887. She graduated from the Royal Academy of Music before turning to work in the film industry. It was here that she invented an early picture and film recording device called a Talkiefone and founded and led the Women's International Film Association.

During the Second World War, Howorth lived in Eastbourne and was employed with the Ministry of Information as well as the Royal Aircraft Establishment. In her personal records, she reported receiving a letter in 1948 inquiring after her interest in atomic energy. Howorth then proceeded to check out Frederick Soddy's The Interpretation of Radium and found herself a believer in atomic energy. She would later go on to publish a biography of Soddy that was published in 1958.

Howorth founded several organizations including the Ladies Atomic Energy Club in 1948, where she presented scientific lectures about atomics with the hope that the attendees would instruct their friends. She also founded the Layman's Institute of Atomic Information, and the Atomic Energy Association of Great Britain whose 1950 celebration of its second anniversary included a performance called Isotopia which featured the characters labeled as proton and neutron.

From 1953 until 1955 Howorth published a quarterly journal called Atomic Digest that included summaries of scientific papers on atomic news, book reviews, and biographies of scientists studying atomic science. In 1959 Howorth served irradiated North Carolina peanuts she received to a group of her scientific friends. When her audience was unimpressed by the large peanuts Howorth planted the remaining peanuts in her garden, where they grew quicker and larger than regular peanuts. In addition to peanuts, Howorth planted irradiated seeds from flowers and hoped to plant irradiated onion. She distributed irradiated tomato seeds from the United States in England and distributed them to members of the Atomic Gardening Society.

Howorth went on to self-publish her book Atomic Gardening and in 1960 founded the Atomic Gardening Society to advocate for her cause of atomic power in the home. Albert Einstein served as a patron of the organization. Members were required to buy a set of seeds that had received radiation and buy Howorth's book.

Howorth also wrote other books including the science fiction book Atom and Eve in 1955 and a children's book on atomic science, Atoms in Wonderland.

== Selected publications ==
- Howorth, Muriel (1960). Atomic gardening. New World Publications. OCLC 3213781.
- Howorth, Muriel (1958). Pioneer research on the atom; Rutherford and Soddy in a glorious chapter of science; the life story of Frederick Soddy, M.A., LL. D., F.R.S., Nobel laureate. New Work Publications. OCLC 802589.
