= Radappertization =

Irradiation of food for enhanced preservation and extended shelf life

Radappertization is a form of food irradiation which applies a dose of ionizing radiation sufficient to reduce the number and activity of viable microorganisms to such an extent that very few, if any, are detectable in the treated food by any recognized method (viruses being excepted).

No microbial spoilage or toxicity should become detectable in a food so treated, regardless of the conditions under which it is stored, provided the packaging remains undamaged. The required dose is usually in the range of 25-45 kiloGrays. The shelf life of radappertized foods correctly packaged will mainly depend on the service life of the packaging material and its barrier properties.

Radappertization is derived from the combination of radiation and Appert, the name of the French scientist and engineer who invented sterilized food for the troops of Napoleon.

== See also ==
- Radicidation
- Radurization
