= Radura =

Symbol for irradiated food items

The Radura logo, used to show a food has been treated with ionizing radiation (international version)

The Radura symbol, used to show a food has been treated with ionizing radiation (U.S. FDA version)

The Radura symbol serves as an international indicator that a food item has undergone irradiation. Typically depicted in green, it features a plant design within a circular outline, with the circle's top section represented by dashes. The specific design elements, including colors, can differ across various countries.

== Meaning of the word "Radura" ==
The word "Radura" is derived from radurization, in itself a portmanteau combining the initial letters of the word "radiation" with the stem of "durus", the Latin word for hard, lasting.

== History ==
The Radura symbol was created by inventors from the former Pilot Plant for Food Irradiation in Wageningen, Netherlands, which later evolved into the company known as Gammaster, now called Isotron. The plant's director at the time, R.M. Ulmann, introduced the symbol to the global community. During a presentation, Ulmann explained the meaning of the Radura symbol: it represents food, specifically an agricultural product depicted as a plant (indicated by a dot and two leaves) inside a sealed package (symbolized by the circle). The symbol also shows the food being irradiated from above, through the packaging, by ionizing rays, which is represented by the breaks in the upper part of the circle.

Initially introduced in the 1960s, the Radura symbol was exclusively used by a food irradiation pilot plant in Wageningen, Netherlands, which held the copyright. Jan Leemhorst, the then president of Gammaster, proactively promoted the symbol's international use. The symbol became available for any entity that complied with established quality standards. Additionally, the Atomic Energy of South Africa adopted the Radura, using the term 'radurized' to describe irradiated food. Leemhorst played a crucial role in having the symbol included in the Codex Alimentarius Standard for irradiated food, providing an option for labeling such products. Presently, the Radura is recognized in the Codex Alimentarius Standard for the Labelling of Prepacked Food.

== Usage ==
The symbol Radura was originally used as a symbol of quality for food processed by ionizing radiation. The Dutch pilot plant used the logo as an identification of irradiated products and as a promotion tool for a high quality product with extended shelf life. In supermarkets where the irradiated mushrooms were on sale the logo was dominantly shown and buyers received a leaflet with information about the process and the advantages of the treated products. In clearances for other products granted by the Dutch authorities at later dates, application of the logo on the product or a clearly visible logo near treated bulk product was even demanded.

== Symbolism ==
Following the later interpretation by some food and process engineers, the symbol may also be read the following way:

- The central dot is the radiation source.
- The two circle segments ('leaves') are the biological shield to protect the workers and the environment.
- The outer ring is the transport system, the lower half of it is shielded from radiation by the biological shield and resembles also the loading area, the upper broken half symbolizes the rays hitting the target goods on the transport system.

== Perception ==
Perceptions of the Radura are often intertwined with common misconceptions of irradiation. Irradiation of food has not been widely adopted in the state of New York due to negative public perceptions, concerns expressed by some consumer groups and the reluctance of many food producers. Proponents of food irradiation have been frustrated by proposals to use international warning symbols for radiation hazard or bio-hazard since irradiated food does not pose any radiological or biological hazards.

The European Community does not provide for the use of the Radura logo and relies exclusively on labeling by the appropriate phrases in the respective languages of the Member States. Furthermore, irradiated ingredients have to be labeled even down to the last molecule contained in the final product; it is also required that restaurant food is labeled according to the same rule. Other countries and regions have varying regulations.

As part of its approval, the U.S. Food and Drug Administration (FDA) requires since 1986 that irradiated foods include labeling with either the statement "treated with radiation" or "treated by irradiation," along with the Radura. In the US, irradiation labeling requirements apply only to foods sold in stores. For example, irradiated spices or fresh strawberries should be labeled. Irradiation labeling does not apply to restaurant foods or processed foods. (NOTE: The Radura symbol as compulsory under FDA-rule has a design slightly different from the Codex Alimentarius version; the 'leaves' being empty areas.)

The city of Berkeley, California, through its nuclear-free zone law, requires that irradiated food intended for human consumption be labeled "Treated with Ionizing Radiation". Food irradiating facilities are also banned as part of this law.

Such requirements are seen by consumer groups as helpful information to consumers concerned about food irradiation.
