= Maris Otter =

Cultivar of barley bred for malt

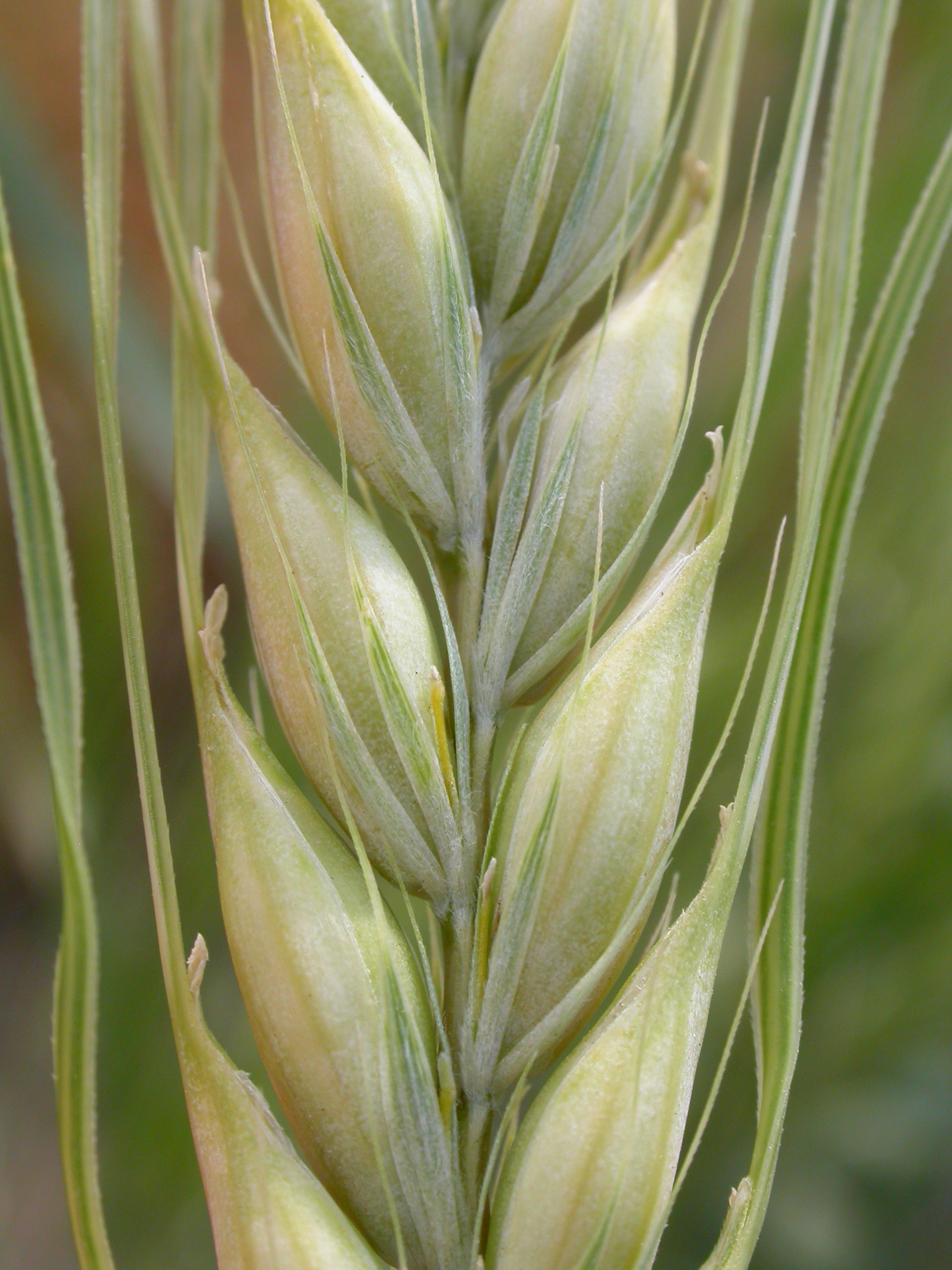
Close-up of an unharvested ear of two row barley, like Maris Otter

Maris Otter is a two-row, autumn sown variety of barley commonly used in the production of malt for the brewing industry. The variety was bred by G D H Bell and his team of plant breeders at the UK's Plant Breeding Institute; the "Maris" part of the name comes from Maris Lane near the institute's home in Trumpington. It was introduced in 1966 and quickly became a dominant variety in the 1970s due to its low nitrogen and superior malting characteristics. By the late-1980s the variety had become unpopular with large breweries and it was removed from the UK National List in 1989.

Maris Otter is a cross of Proctor and Pioneer varieties. In the 1980s Maris Otter usage began to decline for a number of reasons, including: compromised genetic purity caused by cross pollination and improved competition from other varieties.

In 1992, the consortium of grain merchants H Banham Ltd & Robin Appel Ltd bought the sole right to market Maris Otter and in 2002 they bought all rights outright (including the registered trademark). They remain the sole owners and intend to improve the variety on an ongoing basis.

In mainstream brewing the variety has largely been supplanted by newer varieties with better agronomics, but it's still in high demand for premium products. It is one of the few barley malts marketed today by variety. It is very popular both in homebrewing circles and among traditional real ale breweries, many of whom note their exclusive use of Maris Otter in their promotional literature. It carries a price premium over most other comparable varieties.
