= Atomic gardening =

Form of mutation breeding in plants

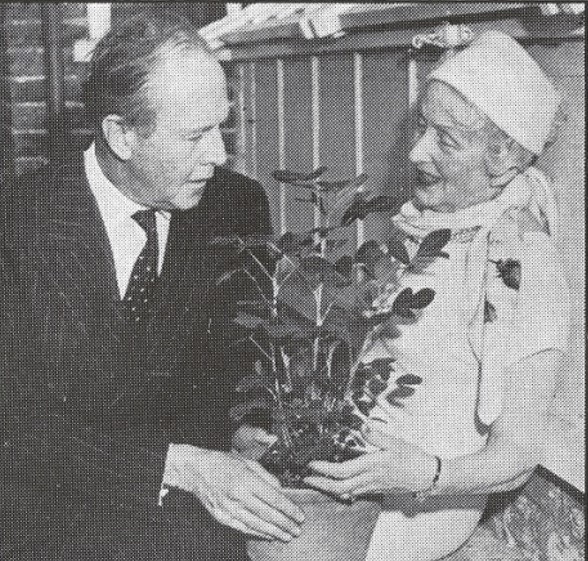
Former Atomic Gardening Society President Muriel Howorth shows popular garden writer Beverley Nichols a two-foot-high (61 cm) peanut plant grown from an irradiated nut in her own backyard.

Atomic gardening is a form of mutation breeding where plants are exposed to radiation. Some of the mutations produced thereby have turned out to be useful. Typically this is gamma radiation – in which case it is a gamma garden – produced by cobalt-60.

The practice of plant irradiation has resulted in the development of more than 2,000 new varieties of plants, most of which are now used in agricultural production. One example is the resistance to verticillium wilt of the 'Todd's Mitcham' cultivar of peppermint, which was produced from a breeding and test program at Brookhaven National Laboratory from the mid-1950s. Additionally, the Rio Red Grapefruit, developed at the Texas A&M Citrus Center in the 1970s and approved in 1984, accounted for more than three quarters of the grapefruit produced in Texas by 2007.

== History ==
Beginning in the 1950s, atomic gardens were a part of "Atoms for Peace", an American program to develop peaceful uses of fission energy after World War II. Gamma gardens were established in laboratories in the United States, Europe, Soviet Union, India, and Japan. Though these gardens were initially designed with the aim of testing the effects of radiation on plant life, research gradually turned towards using radiation to introduce beneficial mutations that could give plants useful characteristics. Such characteristics include increased resilience to adverse weather, or a faster growth rate. In addition, the Atomic Gardening Society was established in 1959 by Muriel Howorth, an atomic activist from the United Kingdom, in conjunction with a growing movement to bring atomic energy and experimentation into the lives of ordinary citizens.

In 1960, Howorth published a book entitled "Atomic Gardening for the Layman" along a similar theme. The Atomic Gardening Society utilized an early form of crowd-sourcing, in which members received irradiated seeds, planted them in their gardens, and sent reports back to Howorth detailing the results. Howorth herself made national news upon growing a two-foot-tall peanut plant after planting an irradiated nut. The youngest member of the society was Christopher Abbey (15), a student at Eastbourne College and the son of a dentist, who received a certificate of merit for propagating several species of irradiated seeds to maturity. Irradiated seeds were sold to the public by C.J. Speas, a Tennessee dentist who had obtained a license for a cobalt-60 source; and sold seeds produced in a backyard cinderblock bunker. Speas did so upon seeing an opportunity for amateur gardeners to get involved in testing. Howorth, in an effort to give the members of her society a broader selection, began ordering seeds from Speas in large quantities. By 1960, Speas had reportedly shipped Howorth over three and a half million seeds, which were then distributed to nearly a thousand individual Society members.

Despite the initial enthusiasm, the Atomic Gardening Society declined by the mid 1960s. This was due to a combination of public opinion moving away from atomic energy and a failure on the part of the crowd-sourced Society to produce noteworthy results. In spite of this, large-scale gamma gardens remained in use, and a number of commercial plant varieties were developed and released by laboratories and private companies alike.

== Methodology ==
Gamma gardens were typically five acres (two hectares) in size, and were arranged in a circular pattern with a retractable radiation source in the middle. Plants were usually laid out like slices of a pie, stemming from the central radiation source; this pattern produced a range of radiation doses over the radius from the center. Radioactive bombardment would take place for around twenty hours, after which scientists wearing protective equipment would enter the garden and assess the results. The plants nearest the center usually died, while the ones further out often featured "tumors and other growth abnormalities". Beyond these were the plants of interest, with a higher than usual range of mutations, though not to the damaging extent of those closer to the radiation source. These gamma gardens have continued to operate on largely the same designs as those conceived in the 1950s.

Research into the potential benefits of atomic gardening has continued, most notably through a joint operation between the International Atomic Energy Agency and the U.N.'s Food and Agriculture Organization. Japan's Institute of Radiation Breeding is well-known for its modern-day usage of atomic gardening techniques.

== Cultural significance ==
The popularity of atomic gardening coincided with a postwar society seeking to put newly discovered atomic energy to use. Many scientists and the public believed that atomic energy could be harnessed to address numerous worldwide issues, including famine and energy shortages, leading them to embrace the new atomic era. Some scientists that had worked on the military application of atomic energy in the past invested in or sponsored programs dedicated to bringing more peaceful applications of atomic energy to the public domain, and this included atomic gardening. As public skepticism of atomic energy grew, and as nuclear arsenals continued to increase in size across the globe, atomic gardening fell out of favor, along with other Atoms for Peace initiatives.

== See also ==
- The Effect of Gamma Rays on Man-in-the-Moon Marigolds
- Mutation breeding
- GMO
