= Aleurone =

Tissue layer in grain seeds

Aleurone (from Greek aleuron, flour) is a protein found in protein granules of maturing seeds and tubers. The term also describes one of the two major cell types of the endosperm, the aleurone layer. The aleurone layer is the outermost layer of the endosperm, followed by the inner starchy endosperm. This layer of cells is sometimes referred to as the peripheral endosperm. It lies between the pericarp and the hyaline layer of the endosperm. Unlike the cells of the starchy endosperm, aleurone cells remain alive at maturity. The ploidy of the aleurone is (3n) [as a result of double fertilization].

== Description ==
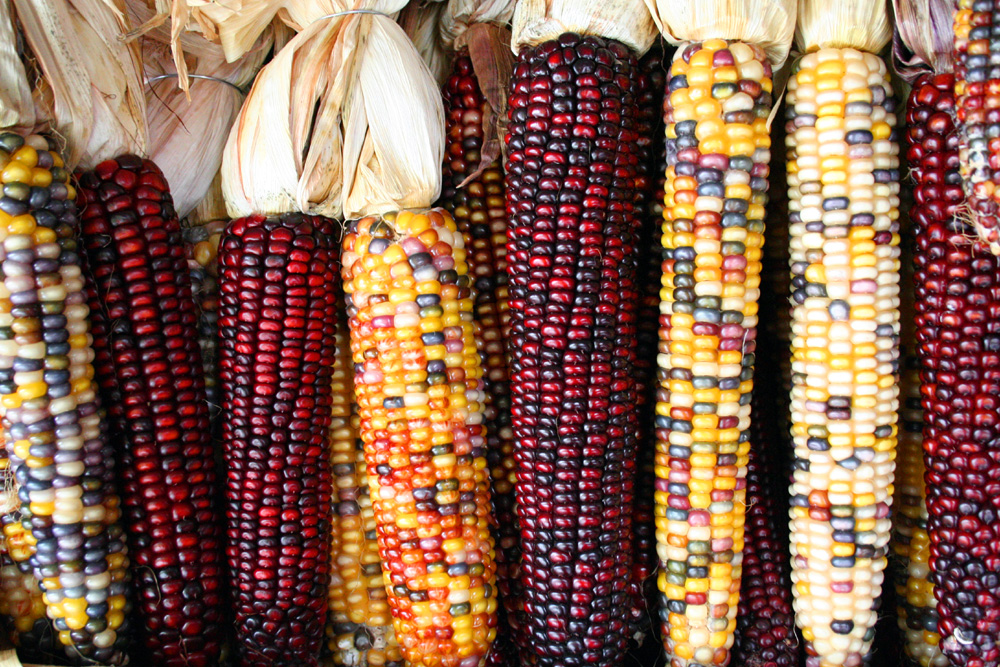
Multicolored corn has some of its pigments in the aleurone layer.

The aleurone layer surrounds the endosperm tissue of grass seeds and is morphologically and biochemically distinct from it. Starchy endosperm cells are large, irregularly shaped cells and contain starch grains while aleurone cells are cuboidal in shape and contain aleurone grains. In most cultivated cereals (wheat species, rye, oats, rice and maize) the aleurone is single-layered, whereas barley has a multicellular aleurone layer. Thick primary cell walls enclose and protect the aleurone cells.

The aleurone layer is important for both the developing seed and the mature plant. The aleurone tissue accumulates large quantities of oils and lipids that are useful during seed development. It is also a site of mineral storage and in some species, functions in seed dormancy. The aleurone may also express several pathogen-protective proteins including PR-4. Aleurone also serves as the most dietarily beneficial fraction in many brans. In addition, the aleurone tissue contains many protein-storing vacuoles known as protein bodies. In cereals with starchy endosperm, the aleurone contains about 30% of the kernel's proteins. In multicolored corn, anthocyanin pigments in the aleurone layer give the kernels a dark, bluish-black color.

Aleurone proteins can have two different morphological features, homogenous and heterogeneous. The homogenous aleurone consists of similar protein bodies (e.g. Phaseolus vulgaris) while the heterogeneous aleurone consists of granules of different shapes and types of proteins covered with a membrane (e.g. Ricinus communis).

== Development ==
The development of the aleurone layer involves several periclinal, and anticlinal cell divisions and several steps of genetic regulation. The dek1 gene and crinkly4 (cr4) kinase both function as positive regulators of aleurone cell fate. The normal dek1 gene is needed in order to receive and respond to positional cues that determine the fate of aleurone cells during development.

Mutants of the dek1 gene block the formation of aleurone and cause the cells to develop as starchy endosperm cells instead of aleurone cells. This causes the seed to lack an aleurone layer. This mutation is caused by the insertion of a Mu transposon into the dek1 gene, causing it to function incorrectly. However, this transposon may sometimes remove itself from the gene, restoring the function of dek1. Experiments in this area have helped demonstrate that the cues that determine aleurone positioning are still present in the later stages of development, and the aleurone cells still respond to these cues.

Similar to the dek1 mutation, genes with a mutation in the cr4 gene also cause a switch in the fate of aleurone cells. The cr4 gene codes for a receptor kinase and so is involved in signal transduction pathways involving the fate of aleurone cells. Plants with a mutated cr4 gene are shorter than normal and produce crinkled leaves.

In addition, several hormones influence the development of the aleurone layer, including auxin, cytokinin, abscisic acid (ABA), and gibberellin (GA). Auxin and cytokinin play a role in the earlier stages of aleurone development. The maturation of aleurone is promoted by ABA while germination is promoted by GA.

== Function ==
The aleurone layer performs a variety of functions to help maintain proper development of the seed. One example of this is maintaining a low pH in the apoplast. In cereals, the aleurone layer releases organic and phosphoric acids in order to keep the pH of the endosperm between a pH of 3.5 and 4. In barley, the aleurone layer also releases nitrite into the starchy endosperm and apoplast under anaerobic conditions. In addition, although the function is unclear, a certain class of hemoglobins is present in the outer layer of living cells including the aleurone tissue in barley and rice seeds.

During seed germination, the plant embryo produces the hormone gibberellin which triggers the aleurone cells to release α-amylase for the hydrolysis of starch, proteases, and storage proteins into the endosperm. Evidence that G-proteins play a role in the gibberellin signaling events has been obtained. The breakdown of the starchy endosperm supplies sugars to drive the growth of roots and the acrospire. This release of amylase is considered to be the most important and sole function of the aleurone layer. This effect is inhibited by the plant hormone abscisic acid, which keeps the seed dormant. After completing this function, the aleurone cells in the developing seed undergo apoptosis.

Experiments conducted in the 1960s confirmed that in order for the aleurone layer to secrete starch-degrading enzymes, the embryo must be present. Following removal of the embryo, starch-degrading enzymes were not released and no degradation of the starch tissue occurred.

The gibberellin effect on the aleurone is used in brewing, specifically in the production of barley malt where treatment ensures that a batch of barley seeds will germinate evenly.
