= Mutation breeding =

Process inducing mutations in seeds

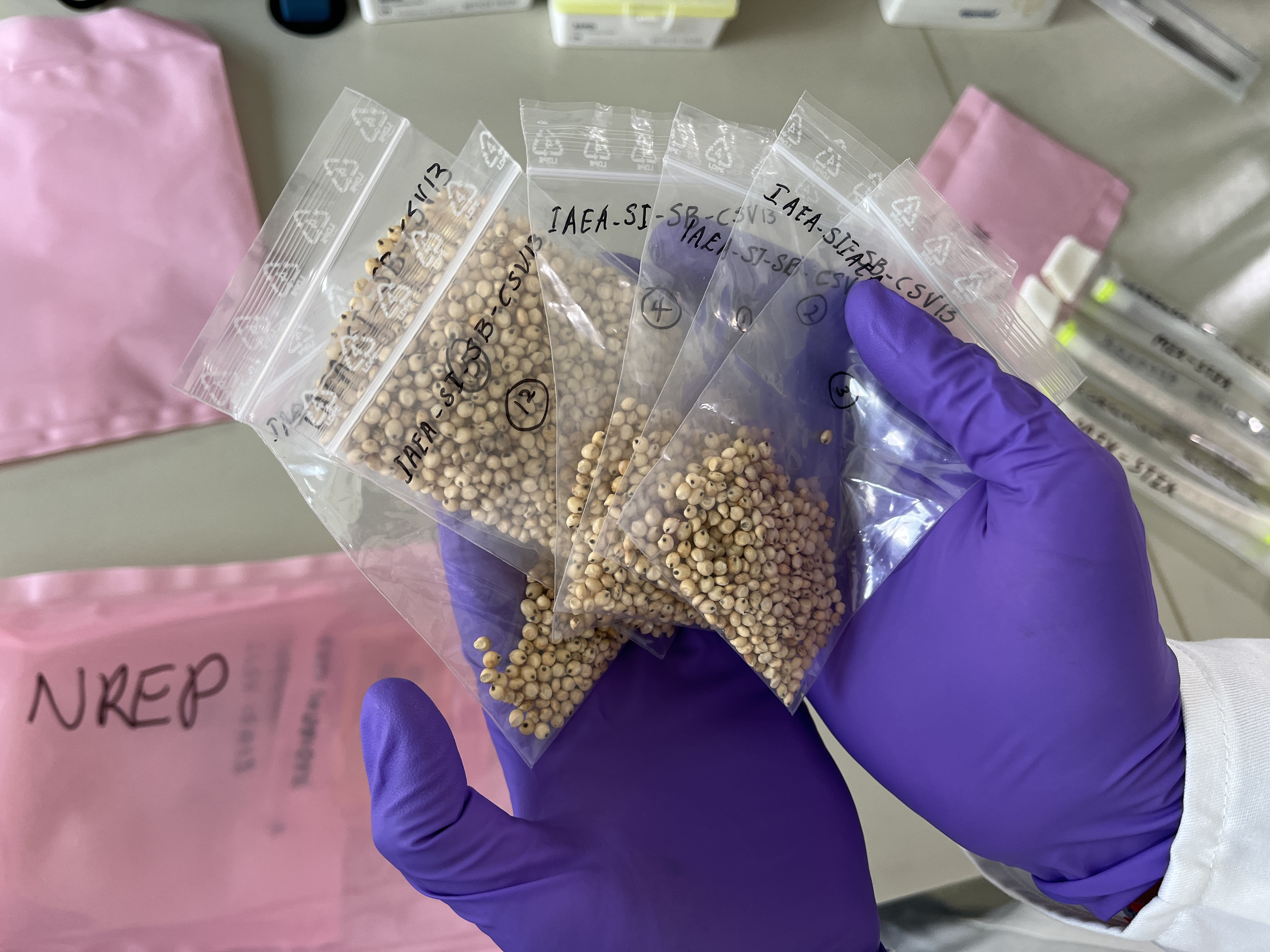
An expert holds sorghum seeds that spent about five months on the International Space Station as part of a research project to explore the effects of cosmic radiation and harsh space conditions on genetic mutation in crops.

Mutation breeding, sometimes referred to as "variation breeding", is the process of exposing seeds to chemicals, radiation, or enzymes in order to generate mutants with desirable traits to be bred with other cultivars. Plants created using mutagenesis are sometimes called mutagenic plants or mutagenic seeds.

From 1930 to 2014 more than 3200 mutagenic plant varieties were released that have been derived either as direct mutants (70%) or from their progeny (30%). Crop plants account for 75% of released mutagenic species with the remaining 25% ornamentals or decorative plants. However, although the FAO/IAEA reported in 2014 that over 1,000 mutant varieties of major staple crops were being grown worldwide, it is unclear how many of these varieties are currently used in agriculture or horticulture around the world, as these seeds are not always identified or labeled as having a mutagenic provenance.

== History ==
According to garden historian Paige Johnson:

After WWII, there was a concerted effort to find 'peaceful' uses for atomic energy. One of the ideas was to bombard plants with radiation and produce lots of mutations, some of which, it was hoped, would lead to plants that bore more heavily or were disease or cold-resistant or just had unusual colors. The experiments were mostly conducted in giant gamma gardens on the grounds of national laboratories in the US but also in Europe and countries of the [then-]USSR.

== Processes ==
There are different kinds of mutagenic breeding such as using chemical mutagens like ethyl methanesulfonate and dimethyl sulfate, radiation or transposons to generate mutants. Mutation breeding is commonly used to produce traits in crops such as larger seeds, new colors, or sweeter fruits, that either cannot be found in nature or have been lost during evolution.

=== Radiation ===
Exposing plants to radiation is sometimes called radiation breeding and is a sub class of mutagenic breeding. Radiation breeding was discovered in the 1920s when Lewis Stadler of the University of Missouri used X-rays on maize and barley. In the case of barley, the resulting plants were white, yellow, pale yellow and some had white stripes. In 1928, Stadler first published his findings on radiation-induced mutagenesis in plants. During the period 1930–2024, radiation-induced mutant varieties were developed primarily using gamma rays (64%) and X-rays (22%), although other sources of radiation such as microwaves or high-energy photons and high-energy electrons can be applied.

Radiation breeding may take place in atomic gardens; and seeds have been sent into orbit in order to expose them to more cosmic radiation.

Ultraviolet has been used, for example to produce knockouts for the investigation of virulence mechanisms of plant pathogens.

==== Space-breeding ====
In space, the ability of plants to develop and thrive is dependent on conditions such as microgravity and cosmic radiation. In theory, variations of these conditions could increase the likelihood of mutation in a plant. China has been experimenting with this theory by sending seeds into space, testing to see if space flights will cause genetic mutations. Since 1987, China has cultivated 66 mutant varieties from space through their space-breeding program, with many already being introduced to the public. In 2011, during the National Lotus Flowers Exhibition in China, a mutant lotus, called the "Outer Space Sun", was on display.

Chromosomal aberrations greatly increased when seeds were sent into aerospace compared to their earth-bound counterparts. The effect of space flight on seeds depends on their species and variety. For example, space-bred wheat saw a large growth in seed germination in comparison to its Earth-bound control, but space-bred rice had no visible advantage compared to its control. For the varieties that were positively mutated by space flight, their growth potential exceeded that of not only their Earth-grown counterparts, but also their irradiated counterparts on Earth. Compared to traditional mutagenic techniques, space-bred mutations have greater efficacy in that they experience positive effects on their first generation of mutation, whereas irradiated crops often see no advantageous mutations in their first generations. Though multiple experiments have shown the positive effects of space flight on seed mutation, there is no clear connection as to what aspect of aerospace has produced such advantageous mutations. There is much speculation around cosmic radiation being the source of chromosomal aberrations, but so far, there has been no concrete evidence of such connection.

Though China's space-breeding program has been shown to be very successful, the program requires a large budget and technological support that many other countries are either unwilling or unable to provide, meaning this program is unfeasible outside of China. Due to such restraints, scientists have been trying to replicate space condition on Earth in order to promote the same expedient space-born mutations on Earth. One such replication is a magnetic field-free space (MF), which produces an area with a weaker magnetic field than that of Earth. MF treatment produced mutagenic results, and has been used to cultivate new mutant varieties of rice and alfalfa. Other replications of space conditions include irradiation of seeds by a heavy 7 Li-ion beam or mixed high-energy particles.

==== Ion beam technology ====
Ion beams mutate DNA by deleting multiple bases from the genome. Compared to traditional sources of radiation, like gamma rays and X-rays, ion beams have been shown to cause more severe breaks in DNA that are more difficult to weave back together, causing the change in DNA to be more drastic than changes caused by traditional irradiation. Ion beams change DNA in a manner that makes it look vastly different than its original makeup, more so than when traditional irradiation techniques are used. Most experimentation, using ion beam technology, has been conducted in Japan. Notable facilities using this technology are TIARA of the Japan Atomic Energy Agency, RIKEN Accelerator Research Facility, and various other Japanese institutions. During the process of ion beam radiation, seeds are wedged between two kapton films and irradiated for roughly two minutes. Mutation frequencies are notably higher for ion beam radiation compared to electron radiation, and the mutation spectrum is broader for ion beam radiation compared to gamma ray radiation. The broader mutation spectrum was revealed through the largely varied amount of flower phenotypes produced by ion beams. Flowers mutated by the ion beams exhibited a variety of colors, patterns, and shapes. Through ion beam radiation, new varieties of plants have been cultivated. These plants had the characteristics of being ultraviolet light-B resistant, disease resistant, and chlorophyll-deficient. Ion beam technology has been used in the discovery of new genes responsible for the creation of more robust plants, but its most prevalent use is commercially for producing new flower phenotypes, like striped chrysanthemums.

==== Mature pollen treated with gamma radiation ====
Gamma radiation is used on mature rice pollen to produce parent plants used for crossing. The mutated traits in the parent plants are able to be inherited by their offspring plants. Because rice pollen has a very short lifespan, researchers had to blast gamma rays at cultured spikes from rice plants. Through experimentation, it was revealed that there was a greater variety of mutation in irradiated pollen rather than irradiated dry seeds. Pollen treated with 46Gy of gamma radiation showed an increase in grain size overall and other useful variations. Typically, the length of each grain was longer after the crossing of irradiated parent rice plants. The rice progeny also exhibited a less chalky visage, improving on the appearance of the parent rice plants. This technique was used to develop two new rice cultivars, Jiaohezaozhan and Jiafuzhan, in China. Along with facilitating the creation of these two rice cultivars, the irradiation of mature rice pollen has produced roughly two hundred mutant rice lines. Each of these lines produce rice grains of both a higher quality and larger size. The mutations produced by this technique vary with each generation, meaning further breeding of these mutated plants could produce new mutations. Traditionally, gamma radiation is used on solely adult plants, and not on pollen. The irradiation of mature pollen allows mutant plants to grow without being in direct contact with gamma radiation. This discovery is in contrast to what was previously believed about gamma radiation: that it could only elicit mutations in plants and not pollen.

=== Chemicals ===
High rates of chromosome aberrations resulting from ionizing radiation and the accompanied detrimental effects made researchers look for alternate sources for inducing mutations. As a result, an array of chemical mutagens has been discovered. The most widely used chemical mutagens are alkylating agents. Ethyl methanesulfonate (EMS) is the most popular because of its effectiveness and ease of handling, especially its detoxification through hydrolysis for disposal. Nitroso compounds are the other alkylating agents widely used, but they are light-sensitive and more precautions need to be taken because of their higher volatility. EMS has become a commonly used mutagen for developing large numbers of mutants for screening such as in developing TILLING populations. Although many chemicals are mutagens, only few have been used in practical breeding as the doses need to be optimised and also because the effectiveness is not high in plants for many.

=== Restriction endonucleases ===
Interest in the use of bacterial restriction endonucleases (RE) – for example Fok1 and CRISPR/Cas9 – to study double-stranded breaks in plant DNA began in the mid-nineties. These breaks in DNA, otherwise known as DSBs, were found to be the source of much chromosomal damage in eukaryotes, causing mutations in plant varieties. REs induce a result on plant DNA similar to that of ionizing radiation or radiomimetic chemicals. Blunt ended breaks in the DNA, unlike sticky ended breaks, were found to produce more variations in chromosomal damage, making them the more useful type of break for mutation breeding. While the connection of REs to chromosomal aberrations is mostly limited to research on mammalian DNA, success in mammalian studies caused scientists to conduct more studies of RE-induced chromosomal and DNA damage on barley genomes. Due to restriction endonucleases' ability to facilitate damage in chromosomes and DNA, REs have the capability of being used as a new method of mutagenesis to promote the proliferation of mutated plant varieties.

== Comparison to other techniques ==
In the debate over genetically modified foods, the use of transgenic processes is often compared and contrasted with mutagenic processes. While the abundance and variation of transgenic organisms in human food systems, and their effect on agricultural biodiversity, ecosystem health and human health is somewhat well documented, mutagenic plants and their role on human food systems is less well known, with one journalist writing "Though poorly known, radiation breeding has produced thousands of useful mutants and a sizable fraction of the world's crops...including varieties of rice, wheat, barley, pears, peas, cotton, peppermint, sunflowers, peanuts, grapefruit, sesame, bananas, cassava and sorghum."

In Canada crops generated by mutation breeding face the same regulations and testing as crops obtained by genetic engineering. (Note: The Canadian regulatory system is based on whether a product has novel features regardless of method of origin. In other words, a product is regulated as genetically modified if it carries some trait not previously found in the species whether it was generated using mutation breeding or genetic engineering (or any other method including selective breeding)) Mutagenic varieties tend to be made freely available for plant breeding, in contrast to many commercial plant varieties or germplasm that increasingly have restrictions on their use such as terms of use, patents and proposed genetic user restriction technologies and other intellectual property regimes and modes of enforcement.

The European Union considers crops produced by mutagenesis technically subject to the GM directive, but the traditional (chemical and radiation) methods are exempt from regulation.

=== Organic food ===
Unlike genetically modified crops, which typically involve the insertion of one or two target genes, plants developed via mutagenic processes with random, multiple and unspecific genetic changes have been discussed as a concern but are not prohibited by any nation's organic standards. Reports from the US National Academy of Sciences state that there is no scientific justification for regulating genetic engineered crops while not doing so for mutation breeding crops.

Several organic food and seed companies promote and sell certified organic products that were developed using both chemical and nuclear mutagenesis. Several certified organic brands, whose companies support strict labeling or outright bans on GMO-crops, market their use of branded wheat and other varietal strains which were derived from mutagenic processes without any reference to this genetic manipulation. These organic products range from mutagenic barley and wheat ingredient used in organic beers to mutagenic varieties of grapefruits sold directly to consumers as organic.

The Codex Alimentarius guidelines for organic food production accepts mutation breeding. The IFOAM - Organics International does not accept the use of induced mutagenesis.

== Release by nation ==
As of 2011 the percentage of all mutagenic varieties released globally, by country, were:

- (25.2%) China
- (15.0%) Japan
- (11.5%) India
- (6.7%) Russia
- (5.5%) Netherlands
- (5.3%) Germany
- (4.3%) United States
- (2.4%) Bulgaria
- (1.7%) Vietnam
- (1.4%) Bangladesh

Notable varieties per country include:

Argentina

- Colorado Irradiado groundnut (mutant created with X-rays; high fat content and yield, 80% of groundnuts grown in Argentina in the 1980s was Colorado Irradiado)
- Puita INTA-CL rice mutant (herbicide resistance and good yield; also grown in Bolivia, Brazil, Costa Rica and Paraguay)

Australia

- Amaroo rice mutant variety (60–70% of rice grown in Australia was Amaroo in 2001)

Bangladesh

- Binasail, Iratom-24 and Binadhan-6 rice mutants
- Binamoog-5 mung bean mutant variety

Cuba

- Maybel tomato mutant (excellent drought resistance)
- GINES rice mutant (created using proton radiation; grows well in salty conditions)

China

- Henong series soybean mutants
- Jiahezazhan and Jiafuzhan rice (mutations obtained by pollen irradiation; high yield and quality, very adaptable, resistant to plant hopper and blast)
- Lumian Number 1 cotton
- Purple Orchard 3 Sweet potato
- Tiefeng 18 soybean
- Yangdao Number 6 rice
- Yangmai 156 wheat
- Zhefu 802 rice mutant (irradiated with gamma rays; resistant to rice blast, good yield even in poor conditions, the most planted rice variety between 1986–1994)
- 26Zhaizao indica rice mutant (created with gamma rays)

Czech Republic

- Diamant barley (high yield, short height mutant created with X-Rays)

Egypt

- Giza 176 and Sakha 101 high yield rice mutants

Finland

- Balder J barley mutant (better drought resistance, yield and sprouting)
- Puhti and Ryhti stiff straw oat mutants

France

- High oleic sunflowers (covering more than 50% of the sunflower acreage)

Germany

- Trumpf barley

Ghana

- Tek bankye mutant cassava (good poundability and increased dry matter content)

India

- Co-4, Pant Mung-2, and TAP mung bean mutants
- MA-9 cotton – the world's first mutant cotton, released in 1948 (X-ray radiation; drought tolerance, high yielding)
- PNR-381 Rice
- Pusa 408 (Ajay), Pusa 413 (Atul), Pusa 417 (Girnar), and Pusa 547 chickpea mutants (resistant to Ascochyta blight and wilt diseases, and have high yields)
- Sharbati Sonora wheat
- Tau-1, MUM 2, BM 4, LGG 407, LGG 450, Co4, Dhauli (TT9E) and Pant moong-1 blackgram (YMC, (Yellow mosaic virus) resistance)
- TG24 and TG37 groundnut mutants

Italy

- Durum wheat (especially Creso mutant, created with thermal neutrons)

Japan

- Osa Gold Pear (disease resistance)
- Most rice varieties grown in Japan have the sd1 mutant allele from the Reimei rice variety

Myanmar

- Shwewartun rice mutant (created by irradiating IR5 rice to give better yield, grain quality and earlier maturity)

Pakistan

- Basmati 370 short height rice mutant
- NIAB-78 cotton mutant (high yielding, heat tolerant, early maturing)
- CM-72 chickpea mutant (created with 150Gy of gamma rays; high yielding, blight resistant)
- NM-28 mungbean mutant (short height, uniform and early maturing, high seed yield)
- NIAB Masoor 2006 lentil mutant (created with 200Gy of radiation; early maturing, high yield, resistant to disease)

Peru

- UNA La Molina 95 barley mutant (developed in 1995 for growing above 3,000 m)
- Centenario Amarinth "kiwicha" mutant (high quality grain and exported as a certified organic product)
- Centenario II barley mutant (developed for growing in the Andean highlands with high yield, high quality flour and tolerance to hail)

Sudan

- Albeely banana mutant (better quality, high yield and better stand)

Thailand

- RD15 and RD6 aromatic indica rice mutants (created with gamma rays and released in 1977-8; RD 15 is early ripening, RD6 has a valuable glutinous endosperm). Thailand is the biggest exporter of aromatic rice in the world

United Kingdom

- Golden Promise barley (semi-dwarf, salt tolerant mutant created with gamma rays) Is used to make beer and whisky

United States

- Calrose 76 Rice (short height rice induced with gamma rays)
- Luther and Pennrad barley (high yield mutant varieties; Pennrad also resistant to winter)
- Murray Mitcham Peppermint (Verticillium wilt tolerance)
- Sanilac bean (X-ray radiation; high yielding mutant – also the Gratiot and Sea-way bean varieties were cross-bred from Sanilac)
- Stadler wheat (high yield mutant with resistance to loose smut and leaf rust and earlier maturity)
- Star Ruby and Rio red varieties of the Rio Star Grapefruit (created using thermal neutron techniques)
- Todd's Mitcham Peppermint (Verticillium wilt tolerance)

Vietnam

- VND 95-20, VND-99-1 and VN121 rice mutants (increased yield, improved quality, resistance to disease and pests)
- DT84, DT96, DT99 and DT 2008 soybean mutants (developed using gamma rays to grow three crops a year, tolerance to heat and cold and resistance to disease)

In 2014, it was reported that 17 rice mutant varieties, 10 soybean, two maize and one chrysanthemum mutant varieties had been officially released to Vietnamese farmers. 15% of rice and 50% of soybean was produced from mutant varieties.

== See also ==
- Atomic gardening
- Dysgenics
