= Food irradiation =

Food sterilization method

The international Radura logo, used to show a food has been treated with ionizing radiation.

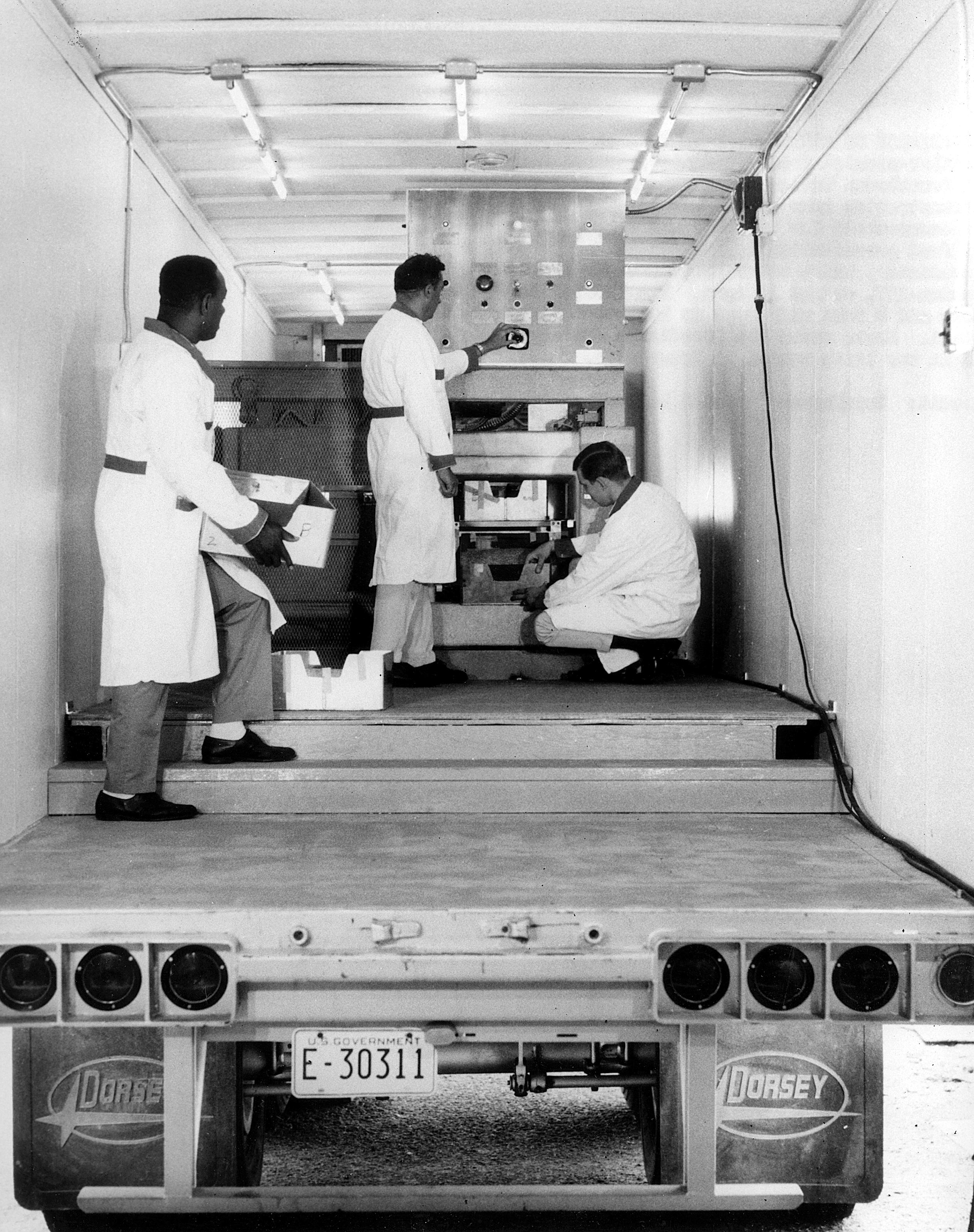
A portable, trailer-mounted food irradiation machine, c. 1968

Food irradiation (sometimes called radurization in American English, and radurisation in British English) is the process of exposing food and food packaging to ionizing radiation, such as from gamma rays, x-rays, or electron beams. Food irradiation improves food safety and extends product shelf life (preservation) by effectively destroying organisms responsible for spoilage and foodborne illness, inhibits sprouting or ripening, and is a means of controlling insects and invasive pests.

Globally, consumer acceptance of irradiated foods grew from 33% to 67% from 1992 to 2024. The U.S. Food and Drug Administration (FDA), the World Health Organization (WHO), the Centers for Disease Control and Prevention (CDC), and U.S. Department of Agriculture (USDA) have performed studies that confirm irradiation to be safe. In order for a food to be irradiated in the U.S., the FDA will still require that the specific food be thoroughly tested for irradiation safety.

Food irradiation is permitted in over 60 countries, and about 500,000 metric tons of such food are processed annually worldwide. The regulations for how food is to be irradiated, as well as the foods allowed to be irradiated, vary greatly from country to country. In Austria, Germany, and many other countries of the European Union only dried herbs, spices, and seasonings can be processed with irradiation and only at a specific dose, while in Brazil all foods are allowed at any dose.

== Uses ==
Irradiation is used to reduce or eliminate pests and the risk of food-borne illnesses as well as prevent or slow spoilage and plant maturation or sprouting. Depending on the dose, some or all of the organisms, microorganisms, bacteria, and viruses present are destroyed, slowed, or rendered incapable of reproduction. When targeting bacteria, most foods are irradiated to significantly reduce the number of active microbes, not to sterilize all microbes in the product. Irradiation cannot return spoiled or over-ripe food to a fresh state. If this food was processed by irradiation, further spoilage would cease and ripening would slow, yet the irradiation would not destroy the toxins or repair the texture, color, or taste of the food.

Irradiation slows the speed at which enzymes change the food. By reducing or removing spoilage organisms and slowing ripening and sprouting (e.g. potato, onion, and garlic) irradiation is used to reduce the amount of food that goes bad between harvest and final use. Shelf-stable products are created by irradiating foods in sealed packages, as irradiation reduces chance of spoilage, the packaging prevents re-contamination of the final product. Foods that can tolerate the higher doses of radiation required to do so can be sterilized. This is useful for people at high risk of infection in hospitals as well as situations where proper food storage is not feasible, such as rations for astronauts.

Pests such as insects have been transported to new habitats through the trade in fresh produce and significantly affected agricultural production and the environment once they established themselves. To reduce this threat and enable trade across quarantine boundaries, food is irradiated using a technique called phytosanitary irradiation. Phytosanitary irradiation sterilizes the pests preventing breeding by treating the produce with low doses of irradiation (less than 1000 Gy). The higher doses required to destroy pests are not used due to either affecting the look or taste, or cannot be tolerated by fresh produce.

== Process ==
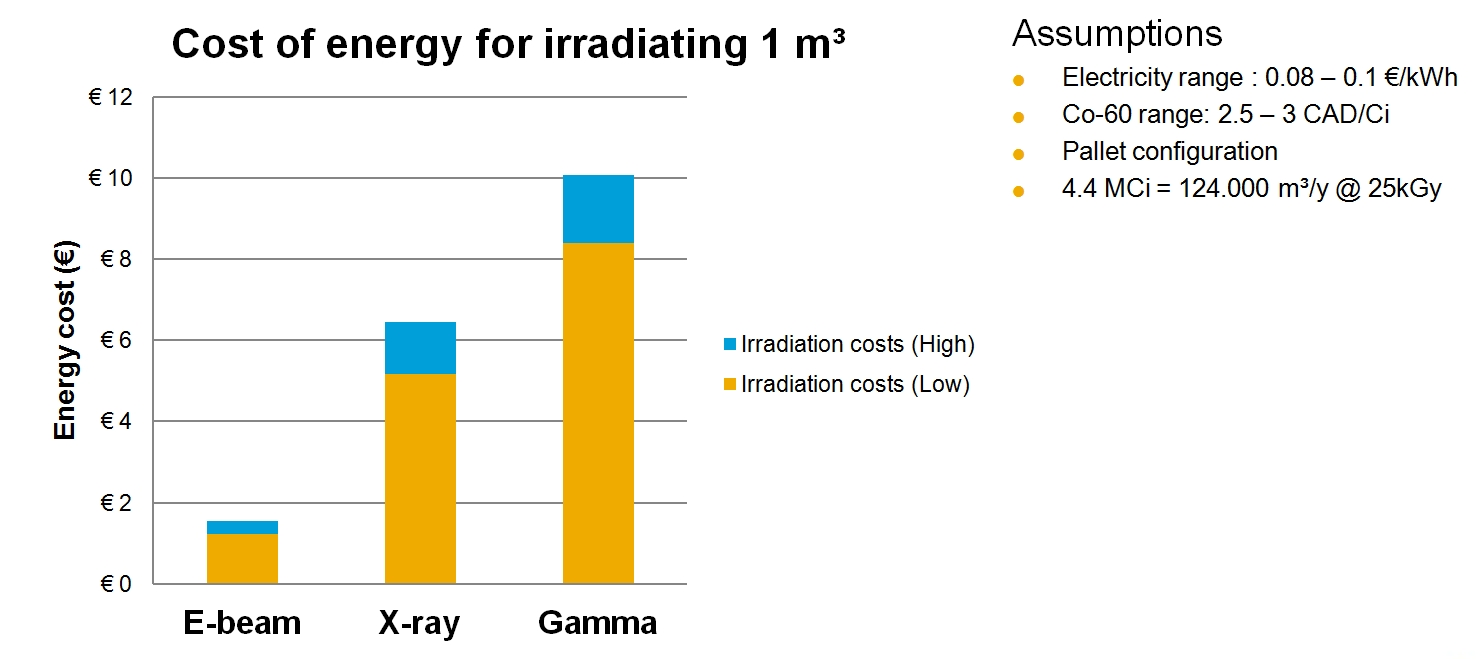
Efficiency illustration of the different radiation technologies (electron beam, X-ray, gamma rays)

The target material is exposed an external source of radiation. The radiation source supplies energetic particles or electromagnetic waves. These particles or waves collide with material in the target. The higher the likelihood of these collisions over a distance are, the lower the penetration depth of the irradiation process is as the energy is more quickly depleted.

These collisions break chemical bonds, creating short lived radicals (e.g. the hydroxyl radical, the hydrogen atom and solvated electrons). These radicals cause further chemical changes by bonding with and or stripping particles from nearby molecules. When collisions occur in cells, cell division is often suppressed, halting or slowing the processes that cause the food to mature.

When the process damages DNA or RNA, effective reproduction becomes unlikely halting the population growth of viruses and organisms. The distribution of the dose of radiation varies from the food surface and the interior as it is absorbed as it moves through food and depends on the energy and density of the food and the type of radiation used.

=== Better quality ===
Irradiation leaves a product with qualities (sensory and chemical) that are more similar to unprocessed food than any preservation method that can achieve a similar degree of preservation.

=== Not radioactive ===
Irradiated food does not become radioactive; only particle energies that are incapable of causing significant induced radioactivity are used for food irradiation. In the United States this limit is 4 mega electron volts (MEV) for electron beams and x-ray sources—cobalt-60 or caesium-137 sources are never energetic enough to induce radioactivity. Particles below this energy can never be energetic enough to modify the nucleus of the targeted atom in the food, regardless of how many particles hit the target material, and so radioactivity can not be induced.

=== Dosimetry ===
The radiation absorbed dose is the amount energy absorbed per unit weight of the target material. Dose is used because, when the same substance is given the same dose, similar changes are observed in the target material(Gy or J/kg). Dosimeters are used to measure dose, and are small components that, when exposed to ionizing radiation, change measurable physical attributes to a degree that can be correlated to the dose received. Measuring dose (dosimetry) involves exposing one or more dosimeters along with the target material.

For purposes of legislation doses are divided into low (up to 1 kGy), medium (1 kGy to 10 kGy), and high-dose applications (above 10 kGy). High-dose applications are above those currently permitted in the US for commercial food items by the FDA and other regulators around the world, though these doses are approved for non commercial applications, such as sterilizing frozen meat for NASA astronauts (doses of 44 kGy) and food for hospital patients.

The ratio of the maximum dose permitted at the outer edge (D_{max}) to the minimum limit to achieve processing conditions (D_{min}) determines the uniformity of dose distribution. This ratio determines how uniform the irradiation process is.

Applications of food irradiation
	Application	Dose (kGy)
Low dose (up to 1 kGy)	Inhibit sprouting (potatoes, onions, yams, garlic)	0.06 - 0.2
Low dose (up to 1 kGy)	Delay in ripening (strawberries, potatoes)	0.5 - 1.0
Low dose (up to 1 kGy)	Prevent insect infestation (grains, cereals, coffee beans, spices, dried nuts, dried fruits, dried fish, mangoes, papayas)	0.15 - 1.0
Low dose (up to 1 kGy)	Parasite control and inactivation (tape worm, trichina)	0.3 - 1.0
Medium dose (1 kGy to 10 kGy)	Extend shelf-life of raw and fresh fish, seafood, fresh produce	1.0 - 5.5
Medium dose (1 kGy to 10 kGy)	Extend shelf-life of refrigerated and frozen meat products	4.5 - 7.0
Medium dose (1 kGy to 10 kGy)	Reduce risk of pathogenic and spoilage microbes (meat, seafood, spices, and poultry)	1.0 - 7.0
Medium dose (1 kGy to 10 kGy)	Increased juice yield, reduction in cooking time of dried vegetables	3.0 - 7.0
High dose (above 10 kGy)	Enzymes (dehydrated)	10.0
High dose (above 10 kGy)	Sterilization of spices, dry vegetable seasonings	30.0 max
High dose (above 10 kGy)	Sterilization of packaging material	10.0 - 25.0
High dose (above 10 kGy)	Sterilization of foods (NASA and hospitals)	44.0

== Chemical changes ==
As ionising radiation passes through food, it creates a trail of chemical transformations due to radiolysis effects. Irradiation does not make foods radioactive, change food chemistry, compromise nutrient contents, or change the taste, texture, or appearance of food.

=== Food quality ===
Decontamination of food by ionizing radiation is a safe and efficient process for elimination of pathogenic bacteria. Ionizing radiation treatment can be applied to either raw materials or ready to eat foods, with some countries, like the United States, imposing limitations on its use. Assessed rigorously over several decades, irradiation in commercial amounts to treat food has no negative impact on the sensory qualities and nutrient content of foods.

==== Research on minimally processed vegetables ====
Watercress (Nasturtium officinale) is a rapidly growing aquatic or semi aquatic perennial plant. Because chemical agents do not provide efficient microbial reductions, watercress has been tested with gamma irradiation treatment in order to improve both safety and the shelf life of the product. It is traditionally used on horticultural products to prevent sprouting and post-packaging contamination, delay post-harvest ripening, maturation and senescence.

==== Public perceptions ====
American consumer's perception of foods treated with irradiation was strongly negative in 1992. Some who advocate against food irradiation argue the long-term health effects and safety of irradiated food cannot be scientifically proven, however there have been hundreds of animal feeding studies of irradiated food performed since 1950. Endpoints include subchronic and chronic changes in metabolism, histopathology, function of most organs, reproductive effects, growth, teratogenicity, and mutagenicity.

== Industrial process ==
Up to the point where the food is processed by irradiation, the food is processed in the same way as all other food.

=== Packaging ===
For some forms of treatment, packaging is used to ensure the food stuffs never come in contact with radioactive substances and prevent re-contamination of the final product. Food processors and manufacturers today struggle with using affordable, efficient packaging materials for irradiation-based processing. The implementation of irradiation on prepackaged foods has been found to impact foods by inducing specific chemical alterations to the food packaging material that migrates into the food. Cross-linking in various plastics can lead to physical and chemical modifications that can increase the overall molecular weight. On the other hand, chain scission is fragmentation of polymer chains that leads to a molecular mass reduction.

=== Treatment ===
To treat the food, it is exposed to a radioactive source for a set period of time to achieve a desired dose. Radiation may be emitted by a radioactive substance, or by X-ray and electron beam accelerators. Special precautions are taken to ensure the food stuffs never come in contact with the radioactive substances and that the personnel and the environment are protected from radiation exposure. Irradiation treatments are typically classified by dose (high, medium, and low), but are sometimes classified by the effects of the treatment (radappertisation, radicidation and radurisation). Food irradiation is sometimes referred to as "cold pasteurisation" or "electronic pasteurisation" because ionising the food does not heat it to high temperatures during the process, and the effect is similar to pasteurisation. The term "cold pasteurisation" is controversial because the term may be used to disguise the fact that the food has been irradiated, and pasteurisation and irradiation are fundamentally different processes.

==== Gamma irradiation ====
Gamma irradiation is produced from the radioisotopes cobalt-60 and caesium-137, which are produced by neutron irradiation of cobalt-59 (the only stable isotope of cobalt) and as a nuclear fission product, respectively. Cobalt-60 is the most common source of gamma rays for food irradiation in commercial scale facilities as it is water-insoluble and hence has little risk of environmental contamination by leakage into the water systems. As for transportation of the radiation source, cobalt-60 is transported in special trucks that prevent release of radiation and meet standards mentioned in the Regulations for Safe Transport of Radioactive Materials of the International Atomic Energy Act. The special trucks must meet high safety standards and pass extensive tests to be approved to ship radiation sources. Conversely, caesium-137 is water-soluble and poses a risk of environmental contamination. Insufficient quantities are available for large-scale commercial use as the vast majority of Caesium-137 produced in nuclear reactors is not extracted from spent nuclear fuel. An incident where water-soluble caesium-137 leaked into the source storage pool requiring NRC intervention has led to near elimination of this radioisotope.

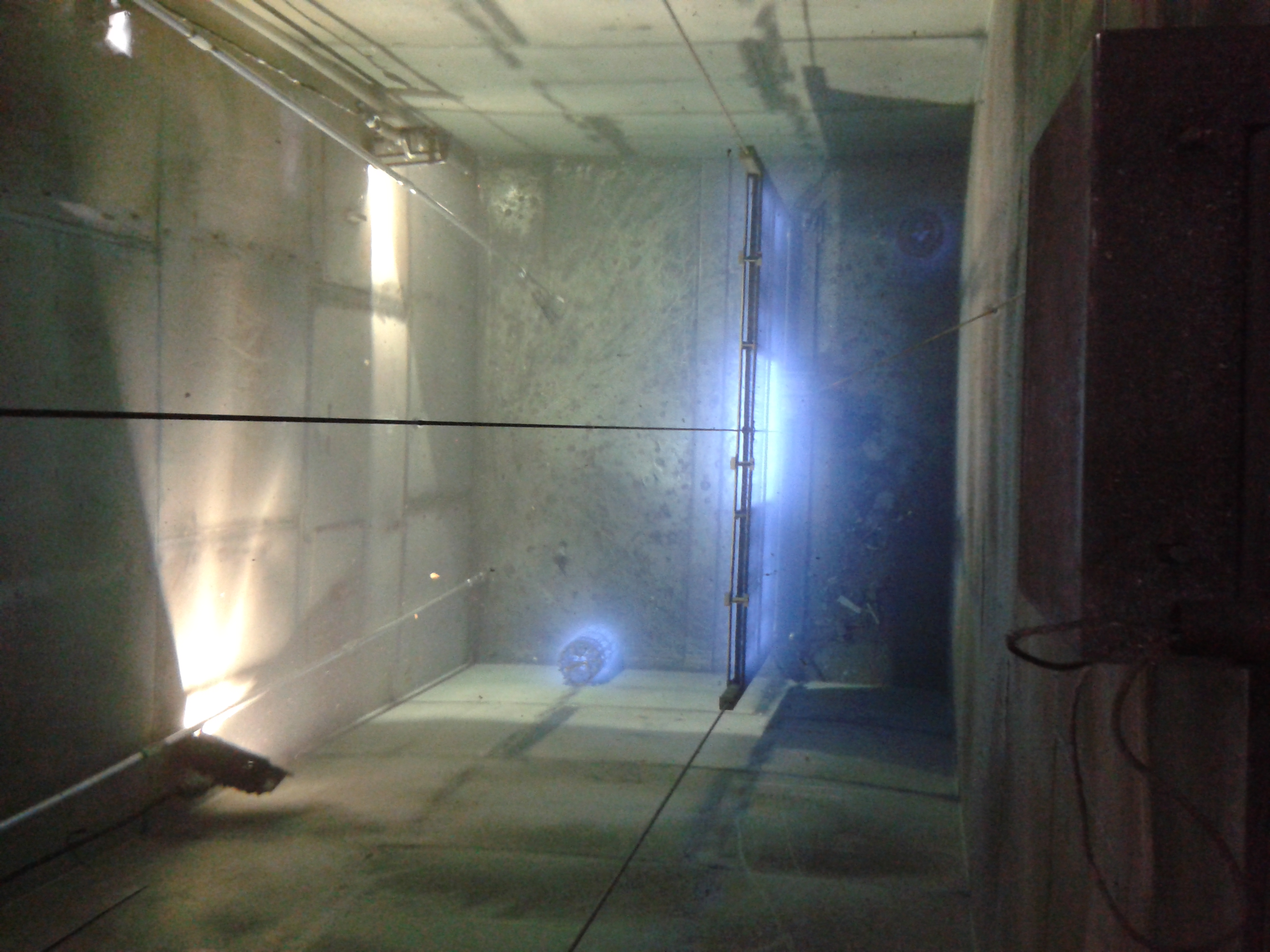
Cobalt-60 stored in Gamma Irradiation machine

Gamma irradiation is widely used due to its high penetration depth and dose uniformity, allowing for large-scale applications with high throughput. Additionally, gamma irradiation is significantly less expensive than using an X-ray source. In most designs, the radioisotope, contained in stainless steel pencils, is stored in a water-filled storage pool which absorbs the radiation energy when not in use. For treatment, the source is lifted out of the storage tank, and product contained in totes is passed around the pencils to achieve required processing.

Treatment costs vary as a function of dose and facility usage. A pallet or tote is typically exposed for several minutes to hours depending on dose. Low-dose applications such as disinfestation of fruit range between US$0.01/lb and US$0.08/lb while higher-dose applications can cost as much as US$0.20/lb.

==== Electron beam ====
Treatment of electron beams is created as a result of high energy electrons in an accelerator that generates electrons accelerated to 99% the speed of light. This system uses electrical energy and can be powered on and off. The high power correlates with a higher throughput and lower unit cost, but electron beams have low dose uniformity and a penetration depth of centimeters. Therefore, electron beam treatment works for products that have low thickness.

==== X-ray ====
X-rays are produced by bombardment of dense target material with high-energy accelerated electrons (this process is known as bremsstrahlung-conversion), giving rise to a continuous energy spectrum. Heavy metals, such as tantalum and tungsten, are used because of their high atomic numbers and high melting temperatures. Tantalum is usually preferred over tungsten for industrial, large-area, high-power targets because it is more workable than the latter and has a higher threshold energy for induced reactions. Like electron beams, X-rays do not require the use of radioactive materials and can be turned off when not in use. X-rays have high penetration depths and high dose uniformity but they are a very expensive source of irradiation as only 8% of the incident energy is converted into X-rays.

==== UV-C ====
UV-C does not penetrate as deeply as other methods. As such, its direct antimicrobial effect is limited to the surface only. Its DNA damage effect produces cyclobutane-type pyrimidine dimers. Besides the direct effects, UV-C also induces resistance even against pathogens not yet inoculated. Some of this induced resistance is understood, being the result of temporary inactivation of self-degradation enzymes like polygalacturonase and increased expression of enzymes associated with cell wall repair.

=== Cost ===
Irradiation is a capital-intensive technology requiring a substantial initial investment, ranging from $1 million to $5 million. In the case of large research or contract irradiation facilities, major capital costs include a radiation source, hardware (irradiator, totes and conveyors, control systems, and other auxiliary equipment), land (1 to 1.5 acres), radiation shield, and warehouse. Operating costs include salaries (for fixed and variable labor), utilities, maintenance, taxes/insurance, cobalt-60 replenishment, general utilities, and miscellaneous operating costs. Perishable food items, like fruits, vegetables and meats would still require to be handled in the cold chain, so all other supply chain costs remain the same. Food manufacturers have not embraced food irradiation because the market does not support the increased price of irradiated foods, and because of potential consumer backlash due to irradiated foods.

The cost of food irradiation is influenced by dose requirements, the food's tolerance of radiation, handling conditions, i.e., packaging and stacking requirements, construction costs, financing arrangements, and other variables particular to the situation.

== State of the industry ==
Irradiation has been approved by many countries. For example, in the U.S. and Canada, food irradiation has existed for decades. Food irradiation is used commercially and volumes are in general increasing at a slow rate, even in the European Union where all member countries allow the irradiation of dried herbs spices and vegetable seasonings, but only a few allow other foods to be sold as irradiated.

Although there are some consumers who choose not to purchase irradiated food, a sufficient market has existed for retailers to have continuously stocked irradiated products for years. When labelled irradiated food is offered for retail sale, consumers buy and re-purchase it, indicating a market for irradiated foods, although there is a continuing need for consumer education.

Food scientists have concluded that any fresh or frozen food undergoing irradiation at specified doses is safe to consume, with some 60 countries using irradiation to maintain quality in their food supply.

== Radurisation risks ==
The following risks can be mentioned:

- As with any sterilisation method, a very small proportion of germs may survive the process, and cause a fraction of the irradiated products to spoil anyway. The risk comes from the false sense of security.
- As mentioned above, the treatment only preserves the freshness of the product at the moment it reaches the factory. If it has already lost some of its qualities, this will not be restored, and may even be hidden by the packaging.
- While the purpose of the irradiation is to degrade the DNA/RNA of contaminating germs, a small proportion of the nutrient load is also degraded in the process. In particular, vitamins, whole proteins and aromatic molecules.
- The irradiation creates highly reactive radicals, which would cause problems if the food is consumed immediately after being irradiated.

== Standards and regulations ==
The Codex Alimentarius represents the global standard for irradiation of food, in particular under the WTO-agreement. Regardless of treatment source, all processing facilities must adhere to safety standards set by the International Atomic Energy Agency (IAEA), Codex Code of Practice for the Radiation Processing of Food, Nuclear Regulatory Commission (NRC), and the International Organization for Standardization (ISO). More specifically, ISO 14470 and ISO 9001 provide in-depth information regarding safety in irradiation facilities.

All commercial irradiation facilities contain safety systems which are designed to prevent exposure of personnel to radiation. The radiation source is constantly shielded by water, concrete, or metal. Irradiation facilities are designed with overlapping layers of protection, interlocks, and safeguards to prevent accidental radiation exposure. Meltdowns are unlikely to occur due to low heat production from sources used.

=== Labeling ===
The Radura symbol, as required by U.S. Food and Drug Administration regulations to show a food has been treated with ionizing radiation.

The provisions of the Codex Alimentarius are that any "first generation" product must be labeled "irradiated" as any product derived directly from an irradiated raw material; for ingredients the provision is that even the last molecule of an irradiated ingredient must be listed with the ingredients even in cases where the unirradiated ingredient does not appear on the label. The RADURA-logo is optional; several countries use a graphical version that differs from the Codex-version. The suggested rules for labeling is published at CODEX-STAN – 1 (2005), and includes the usage of the Radura symbol for all products that contain irradiated foods. The Radura symbol is not a designator of quality. The amount of pathogens remaining is based upon dose and the original content and the dose applied can vary on a product by product basis.

The European Union follows the Codex's provision to label irradiated ingredients down to the last molecule of irradiated food. The European Union does not provide for the use of the Radura logo and relies exclusively on labeling by the appropriate phrases in the respective languages of the Member States. The European Union enforces its irradiation labeling laws by requiring its member countries to perform tests on a cross section of food items in the market-place and to report to the European Commission. The results are published annually on EUR-Lex.

The US defines irradiated foods as foods in which the irradiation causes a material change in the food, or a material change in the consequences that may result from the use of the food. Therefore, food that is processed as an ingredient by a restaurant or food processor is exempt from the labeling requirement in the US. All irradiated foods must include a prominent Radura symbol followed in addition to the statement "treated with irradiation" or "treated by irradiation. Bulk foods must be individually labeled with the symbol and statement or, alternatively, the Radura and statement should be located next to the sale container.

=== Packaging ===
Under section 409 of the Federal Food, Drug, and Cosmetic Act, irradiation of prepackaged foods requires premarket approval for not only the irradiation source for a specific food but also for the food packaging material. Approved packaging materials include various plastic films, yet does not cover a variety of polymers and adhesive based materials that have been found to meet specific standards. The lack of packaging material approval limits manufacturers production and expansion of irradiated prepackaged foods.

Approved materials by FDA for Irradiation according to 21 CFR 179.45:

Material	Paper (kraft)	Paper (glassine)	Paperboard	Cellophane (coated)	Polyolefin film	Polyestyrene film	Nylon-6	Vegetable Parchment	Nylon 11
Irradiation (kGy)	.05	10	10	10	10	10	10	60	60

=== Food safety ===
In 2003, the Codex Alimentarius removed any upper dose limit for food irradiation as well as clearances for specific foods, declaring that all are safe to irradiate. Countries such as Pakistan and Brazil have adopted the Codex without any reservation or restriction.

Standards that describe calibration and operation for radiation dosimetry, as well as procedures to relate the measured dose to the effects achieved and to report and document such results, are maintained by the American Society for Testing and Materials (ASTM international) and are also available as ISO/ASTM standards.

All of the rules involved in processing food are applied to all foods before they are irradiated.

==== United States ====
The U.S. Food and Drug Administration (FDA) is the agency responsible for regulation of radiation sources in the United States. Irradiation, as defined by the FDA is a "food additive" as opposed to a food process and therefore falls under the food additive regulations. Each food approved for irradiation has specific guidelines in terms of minimum and maximum dosage as determined safe by the FDA. Packaging materials containing the food processed by irradiation must also undergo approval. The United States Department of Agriculture (USDA) amends these rules for use with meat, poultry, and fresh fruit.

The United States Department of Agriculture (USDA) has approved the use of low-level irradiation as an alternative treatment to pesticides for fruits and vegetables that are considered hosts to a number of insect pests, including fruit flies and seed weevils. Under bilateral agreements that allows less-developed countries to earn income through food exports agreements are made to allow them to irradiate fruits and vegetables at low doses to kill insects, so that the food can avoid quarantine.

The U.S. Food and Drug Administration and the U.S. Department of Agriculture have approved irradiation of the following foods and purposes:

- Packaged refrigerated or frozen red meat — to control pathogens (E. Coli O157:H7 and Salmonella) and to extend shelf life
- Packaged poultry — control pathogens (Salmonella and Camplylobacter)
- Fresh fruits, vegetables, and grains — to control insects and inhibit growth, ripening and sprouting
- Pork — to control trichinosis
- Herbs, spices and vegetable seasonings — to control insects and microorganisms
- Dry or dehydrated enzyme preparations — to control insects and microorganisms
- White potatoes — to inhibit sprout development
- Wheat and wheat flour — to control insects
- Loose or bagged fresh iceberg lettuce and spinach
- Crustaceans (lobster, shrimp, and crab)
- Shellfish (oysters, clams, mussels, and scallops)

==== European Union ====
European law stipulates that all member countries must allow the sale of irradiated dried aromatic herbs, spices and vegetable seasonings. However, these Directives allow Member States to maintain previous clearances food categories the EC's Scientific Committee on Food (SCF) had previously approved (the approval body is now the European Food Safety Authority). Presently, Belgium, Czech Republic, France, Italy, Netherlands, and Poland allow the sale of many different types of irradiated foods. Before individual items in an approved class can be added to the approved list, studies into the toxicology of each of such food and for each of the proposed dose ranges are requested. It also states that irradiation shall not be used "as a substitute for hygiene or health practices or good manufacturing or agricultural practice". These Directives only control food irradiation for food retail and their conditions and controls are not applicable to the irradiation of food for patients requiring sterile diets. In 2021 the most common food items irradiated were frog legs at 65.1%, poultry 20.6% and dried aromatic herbs, spices and vegetables seasoning.

Due to the European Single Market, any food, even if irradiated, must be allowed to be marketed in any other member state even if a general ban of food irradiation prevails, under the condition that the food has been irradiated legally in the state of origin.

Furthermore, imports into the EC are possible from third countries if the irradiation facility had been inspected and approved by the EC and the treatment is legal within the EC or some Member state.

==== Australia ====
In Australia, following cat deaths after irradiated cat food consumption and producer's voluntary recall, cat food irradiation was banned.

=== Nuclear safety and security ===
Interlocks and safeguards are mandated to minimize this risk. There have been radiation-related accidents, deaths, and injury at such facilities, many of them caused by operators overriding the safety related interlocks. In a radiation processing facility, radiation specific concerns are supervised by special authorities, while "Ordinary" occupational safety regulations are handled much like other businesses.

The safety of irradiation facilities is regulated by the United Nations International Atomic Energy Agency and monitored by the different national Nuclear Regulatory Commissions. The regulators enforce a safety culture that mandates that all incidents that occur are documented and thoroughly analyzed to determine the cause and improvement potential. Such incidents are studied by personnel at multiple facilities, and improvements are mandated to retrofit existing facilities and future design.

In the US the Nuclear Regulatory Commission (NRC) regulates the safety of the processing facility, and the United States Department of Transportation (DOT) regulates the safe transport of the radioactive sources.

== Origin of the word "Radurisation" ==
The word "radurisation" is derived from radura, combining the initial letters of the word "radiation" with the stem of "durus", the Latin word for hard, lasting.

== Historical timeline ==
- 1895 Wilhelm Conrad Röntgen discovers X-rays ("bremsstrahlung", from German for radiation produced by deceleration)
- 1896 Antoine Henri Becquerel discovers natural radioactivity; Minck proposes the therapeutic use
- 1904 Samuel Prescott describes the bactericide effects Massachusetts Institute of Technology (MIT)
- 1906 Appleby & Banks: UK patent to use radioactive isotopes to irradiate particulate food in a flowing bed
- 1918 Gillett: U.S. Patent to use X-rays for the preservation of food
- 1921 Schwartz describes the elimination of Trichinella from food
- 1930 Wuest: French patent on food irradiation
- 1943 MIT becomes active in the field of food preservation for the U.S. Army
- 1951 U.S. Atomic Energy Commission begins to co-ordinate national research activities
- 1958 World first commercial food irradiation (spices) at Stuttgart, Germany
- 1963 FDA approves food irradiation. NASA begins irradiating astronaut food items to prevent food borne illness during space missions.
- 1970 Establishment of the International Food Irradiation Project (IFIP), headquarters at the Federal Research Centre for Food Preservation, Karlsruhe, Germany
- 1980 FAO/IAEA/WHO Joint Expert Committee on Food Irradiation recommends the clearance generally up to 10 kGy "overall average dose"
- 1981/1983 End of IFIP after reaching its goals
- 1983 Codex Alimentarius General Standard for Irradiated Foods: any food at a maximum "overall average dose" of 10 kGy
- 1984 International Consultative Group on Food Irradiation (ICGFI) becomes the successor of IFIP
- 1986 January People's Republic of China opens their first food irradiation facility in Shanghai
- 1994 India approves irradiation of spices, potato and onion.
- 1997 FAO/IAEA/WHO Joint Study Group on High-Dose Irradiation recommends to lift any upper dose limit
- 1998 The European Union's Scientific Committee on Food (SCF) voted in favour of eight categories of irradiation applications
- 1999 The European Union adopts Directives 1999/2/EC (framework Directive) and 1999/3/EC (implementing Directive) limiting irradiation a positive list whose sole content is one of the eight categories approved by the SCF, but allowing the individual states to give clearances for any food previously approved by the SCF.
- 2000 Germany leads a veto on a measure to provide a final draft for the positive list.
- 2003 Codex Alimentarius General Standard for Irradiated Foods: no longer any upper dose limit
- 2003 The SCF adopts a "revised opinion" that recommends against the cancellation of the upper dose limit.
- 2004 ICGFI ends
- 2011 The successor to the SCF, European Food Safety Authority (EFSA), reexamines the SCF's list and makes further recommendations for inclusion.

== See also ==
- Deinococcus radiodurans
- Acute radiation syndrome, effects of exposure to high levels of ionizing radiation
- Food labeling regulations
- Food and cooking hygiene
- Irradiated mail
- Chemical sterilization
- Radappertization
- Radicidation
- Radura
