= Winter cereal =

Biennial cereal crops sown in the autumn

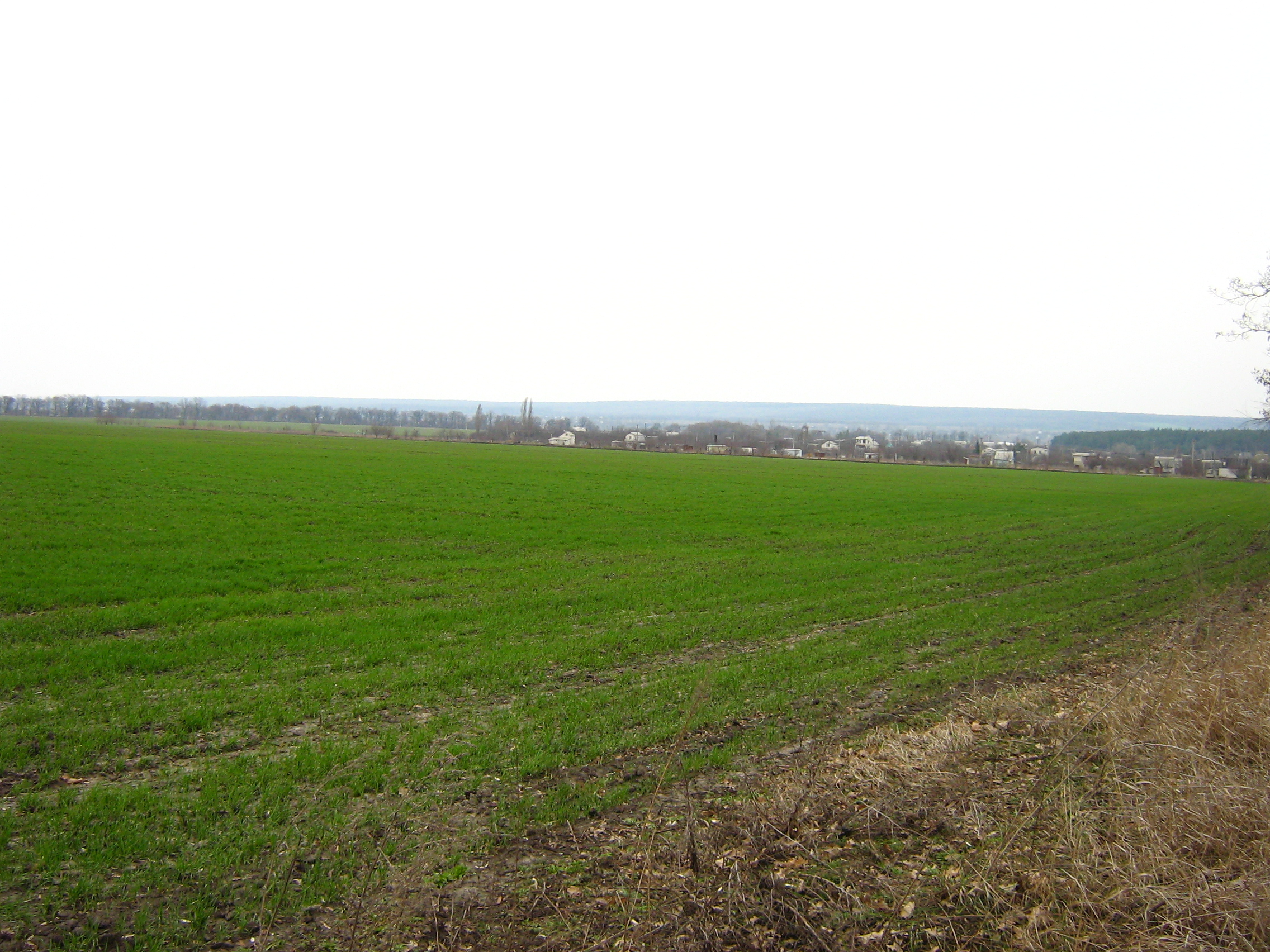
Winter wheat at the end of March

Winter cereals, also called winter grains, fall cereals, fall grains, or autumn-sown grains, are biennial cereal crops sown in the autumn. They germinate before winter comes, may partially grow during mild winters or simply persevere under a sufficiently thick snow cover to continue their life cycle in spring.

They are harvested earlier than grains of the same type sown in springtime. In general, winter cereals have a much higher yield than spring cereals because they can use snow as moisture for growth.

Winter strains are available for rye (winter or fall rye), wheat (winter or fall wheat), barley (winter or fall barley) and triticale (winter triticale).

Rabbinic sources recognize three types of wheat and two of barley as winter-grown cereal crops.

== See also ==
- Rabi crop
