= Birria =

Mexican meat-based stew

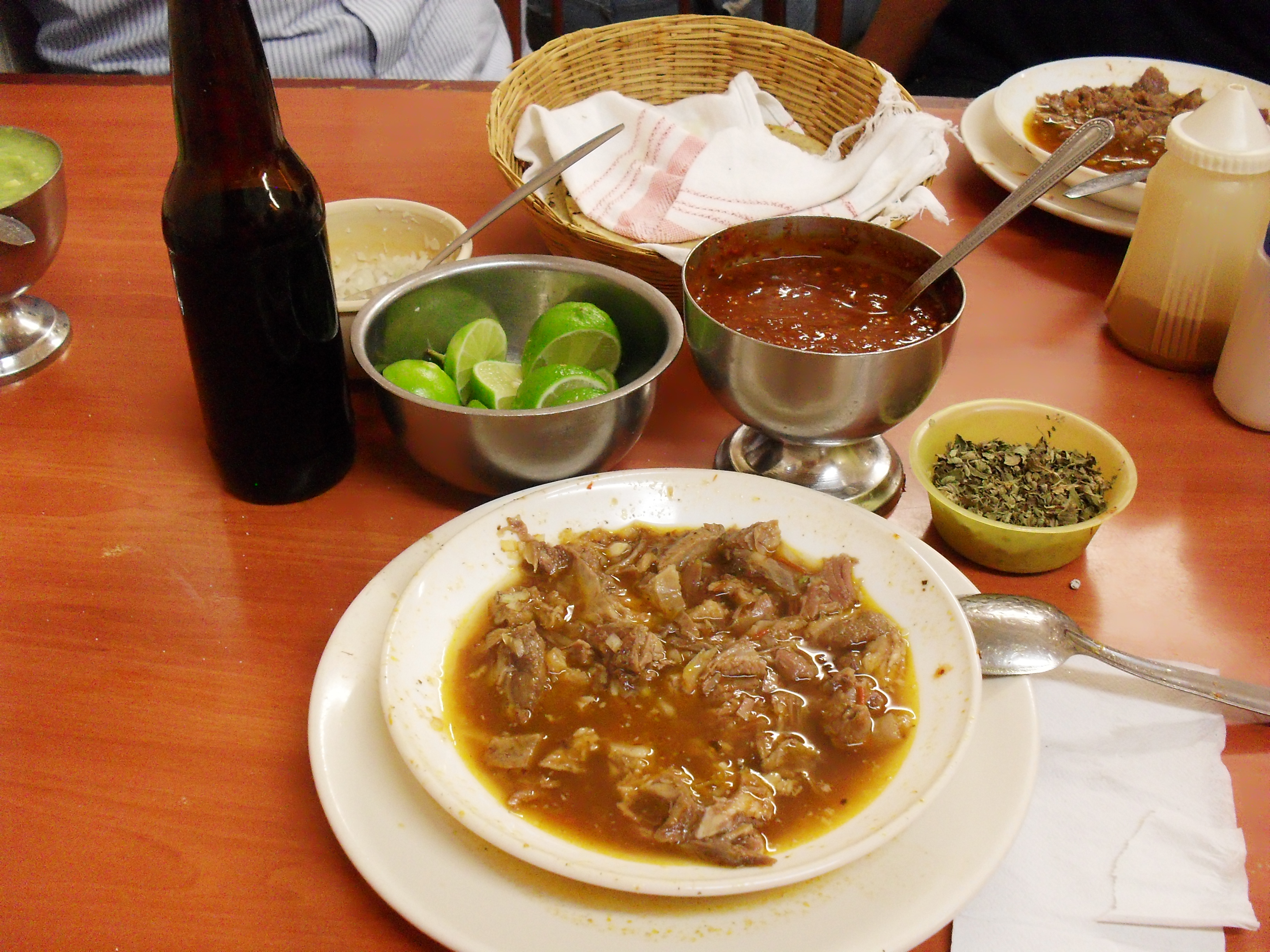
- Birria served with condiments
- Type: Stew
- Place of origin: Mexico
- Region or state: Jalisco
- Main ingredients: Meat (typically goat or beef), dried chili peppers

Birria (Spanish: [ˈbirja]) is a regional variation of barbacoa from western Mexico, mainly made with goat, beef or lamb. The meat is marinated in an adobo made of vinegar, dried chiles, garlic, and herbs and spices (including cumin, bay leaves, and thyme) before being cooked in a broth (Spanish: consomé). Originally, birria was the regional name used in and around Jalisco for a form of barbacoa, but for many people today, mostly in the United States, birria is now a distinct dish.

It is often served at celebratory occasions such as weddings, baptisms and during holidays such as Christmas and Easter, and even at funerals. Preparation techniques vary, but the dish is often served with corn tortillas, onions, cilantro, and lime. Birria is also served with tacos.

Restaurants or street carts that serve birria are known as birrierías and exist throughout Mexico, especially in Michoacán and Jalisco. However, neighboring Mexican states, including Aguascalientes, Zacatecas, and Colima, have their own variations of the dish.

== History ==
The term birria was originally the regional name given in the state of Jalisco and surrounding areas to meats cooked in a pit or earth oven, what is known in other parts of Mexico as barbacoa. The Mexican chef and professor Josefina Velázquez de León stated that barbacoa has many variations or styles depending on the region of Mexico, and that birria was one style.

The Cuban professor Félix Ramos y Duarte had defined the term in 1898 as a regionalism from Mexico City for goat barbacoa or roasted goat. Mexican linguist and philologist Darío Rubio wrote in 1925 that "birria" was a lower social class term for "barbacoa". Mexican historian Leovigildo Islas Escárcega stated in 1945 that birria was a term specifically from Jalisco and some areas of the interior for barbacoa. Mexican linguist and philologist Francisco J. Santamaría defined the term in 1959 as being another name for barbacoa, typically made from lamb or goat, and cited the work of Mexican scholar José Ignacio Dávila Garibi who argued that the term was of Coca origin and not from the Spanish term birria meaning worthless. Mexican writer and essayist Jorge Mejia Prieto defined it in 1985 as a "soupy barbacoa made with lamb or goat meat from Guadalajara, Jalisco".

=== Folk history ===
There exist many folk stories and myths about the origin of the term. One such story argues that in 1519, Hernán Cortés and the Conquistadors first landed in Mexico, bringing various old-world domestic animals, including goats. During the conquest of the Aztec Empire, the Conquistadors were faced with an overpopulation of goats, so they decided to give the animals to the natives. While goat meat was supposedly looked down upon by the Conquistadors, as it was tough and had a strong smell, the natives accepted the animals, as marinating the meat in indigenous styles made it palatable and appetizing. The dishes they produced were called "birria", a derogatory term meaning "worthless", by the Spanish, in reference to their having given the natives meat with apparently noxious characteristics.

According to another legend, the dish was invented accidentally during the eruption of a volcano, when a shepherd was forced to abandon his goats in a cave where they were cooked perfectly by the steam.

== Variations ==
Traditionally birria was served on bread, tortillas or even directly in hand. Many variations of the dish have derived since.

In 1950, a taquero named Guadalupe Zárate set up a taco stand in Tijuana, after moving there from Coatzingo, Puebla. Zárate's stand initially sold asado and pastor tacos. Zárate soon decided to make beef birria because goat meat was more expensive and less fatty. One day, someone told Zárate to add more liquid to the meat. The resulting dish is now known as Tijuana-style beef birria, making Zárate a household name among birrierías for being the first person in Tijuana to make birria with consomé.

During the 2010s, the quesabirria (a taco stuffed with birria and cheese, often served with consommé) became popular in North America after first being developed in Tijuana. Chef Antonio de Livier of Mexico City is credited with another variation called birriamen (a portmanteau of birria and ramen) using chūkamen noodles in the broth, and the variation later gained popularity in the Los Angeles area.

Other versions of the dish include birria tatemada (charred birria). After marinating and simmering the meat, it is placed in a hot oven until crispy.

== Gallery ==
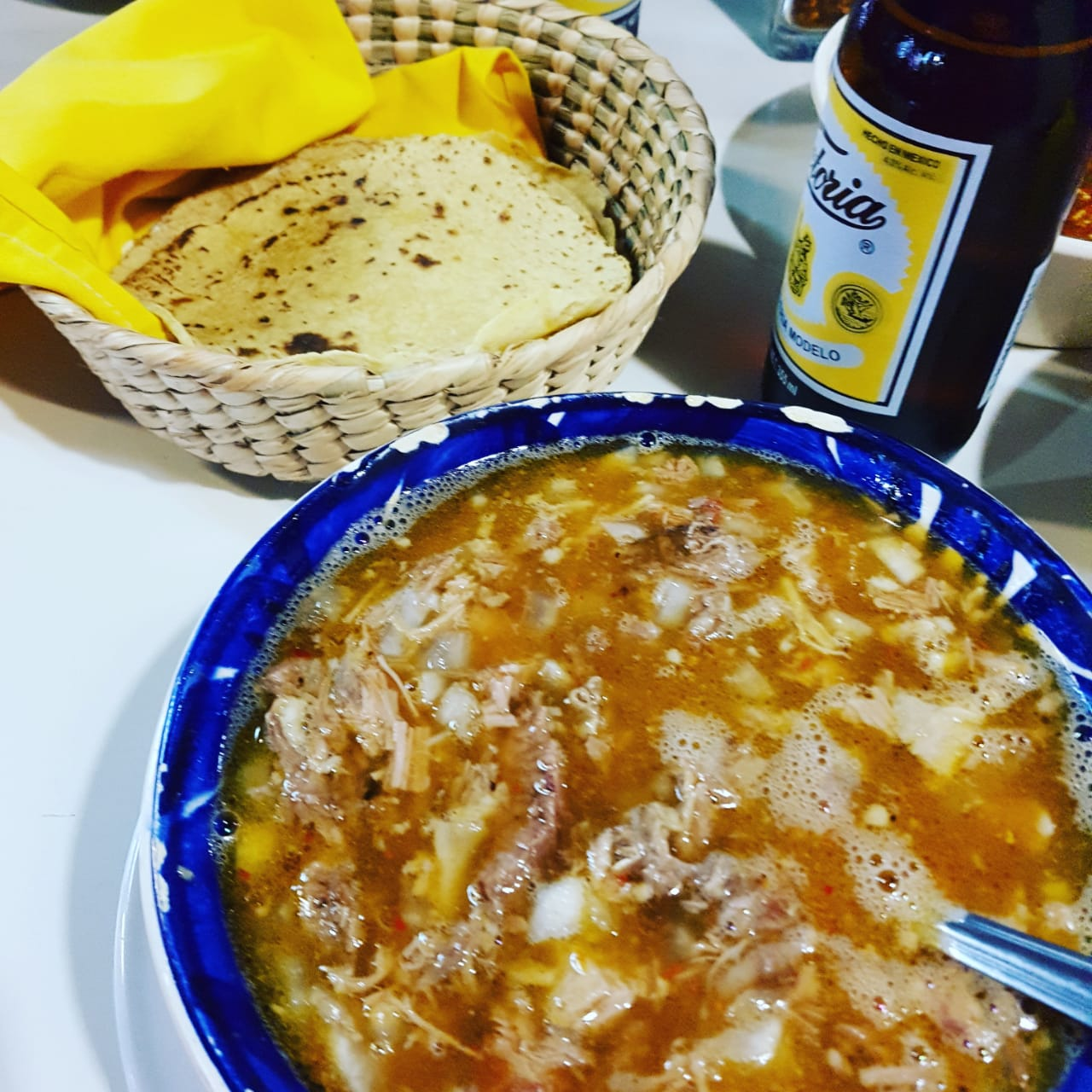
Birria with warmed tortillas and beer

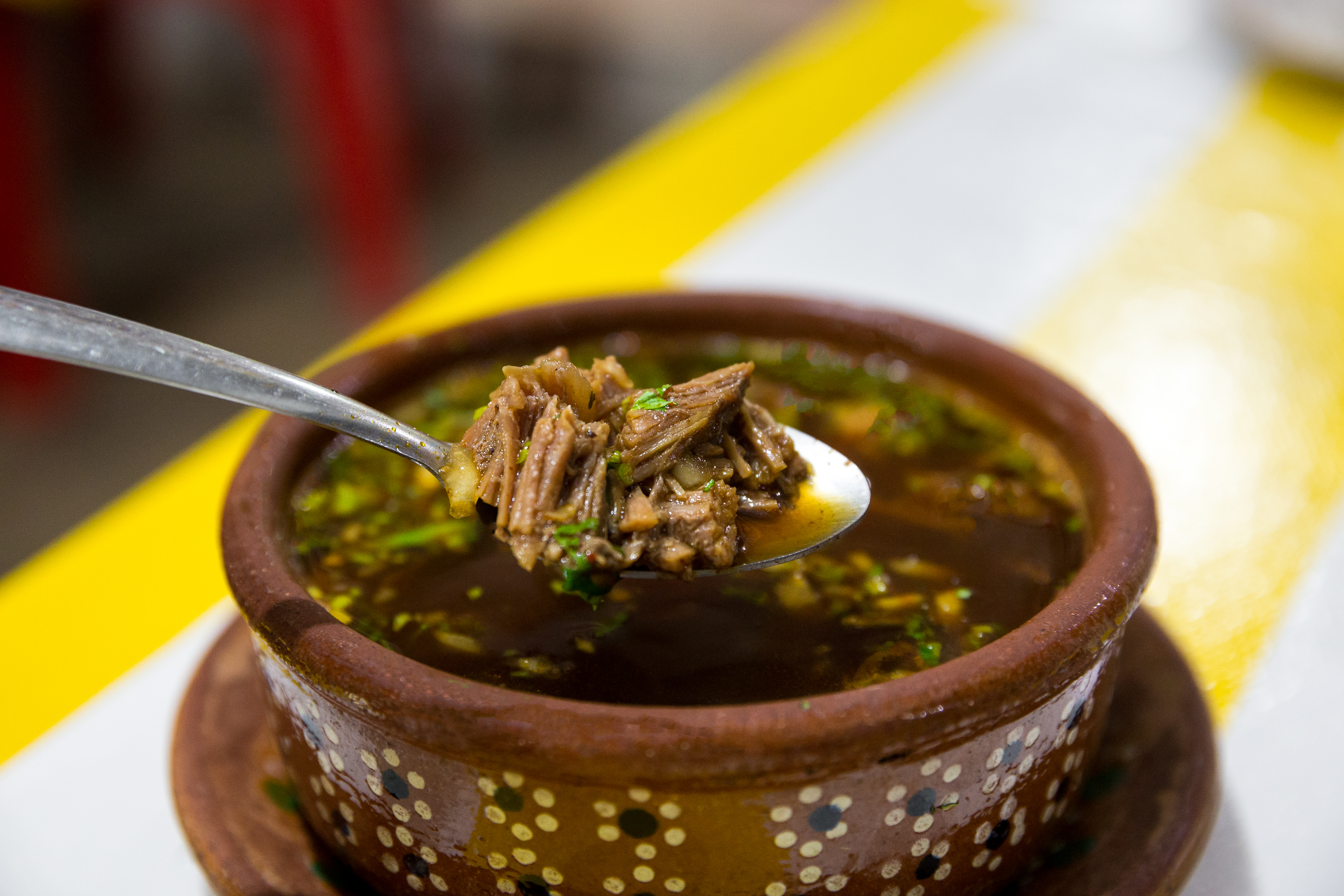
Birria with consomé

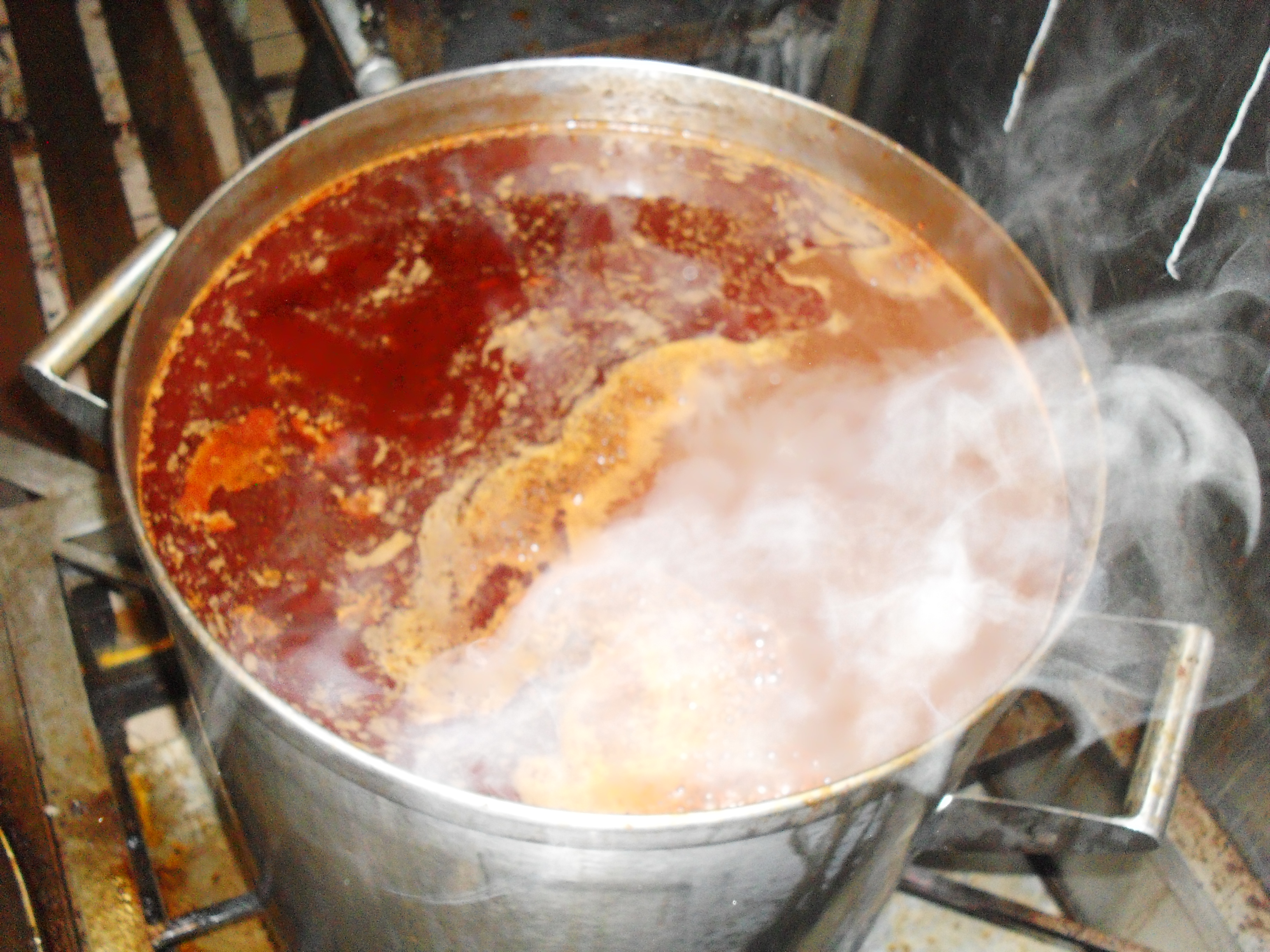
Birria pot

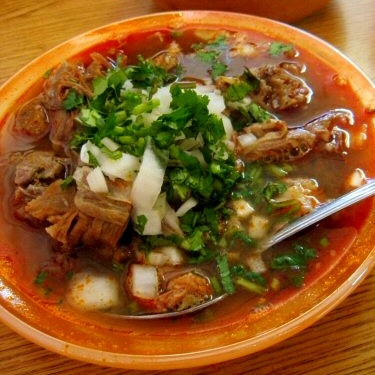
Birria

== See also ==
- List of goat dishes
- List of Mexican dishes
- Menudo
- Mexican cuisine
- Pozole
- Birria taco
- Birrieria Y Taqueria Cortez
