= Kiwellin =

Type of protein

Kiwellin is a protein prevalent in cell walls of plants. It is one of the most abundant proteins found in kiwifruits and is known to be an allergen in humans. In maize it works as part of its defense mechanism against corn smut. and may also be part of the tomato and potato plants defense mechanism against potato blight
