= Birrieria Y Taqueria Cortez =

Mexican restaurant in Fort Worth, Texas

- Interactive map of Birrieria Y Taqueria Cortez

Restaurant information
- Established: 2020
- Owner: Rogelio Cortez
- Food type: Birria
- Location: 2108 E Rosedale Street, Fort Worth, Texas, United States
- Coordinates: 32°43′52″N 97°17′52″W
- Website: birrieriacortez.com

Birrieria Y Taqueria Cortez is a Mexican restaurant in Fort Worth, Texas, United States.

== Description ==
The restaurant has orange-red walls decorated with airbrushed murals and has been described as casual and affordable. The restaurant specializes in birria, which is served in a variety of ways including as tacos, flautas, tortas, quesadillas, burritos, quesabirria, sliders, and pizza. It offers cocktails, Mexican Coke, agua fresca and other drinks.

== History ==
The restaurant began as a food truck founded by Rogelio Cortez Jr. in Polytechnic Heights, Fort Worth, in February 2020. He is the son of Rogelio Cortez Sr. and Patricia Cortez, immigrants from Jalisco. Rogelio Jr. began cooking his mother's recipes for friends and family after injuring his back while working for a roofing company in 2019. The business was successful enough that his father Rogelio Cortez Sr. bought a food truck for it. Rogelio Sr. and Patricia work in the kitchen, and the rest of their children help to run the restaurant. The restaurant moved into a brick-and-mortar location in October 2021. The building had been owned by State Representative Ramon Romero Jr., who closed his restaurant that year and offered to lease the property to Cortez.

== Reception ==
Texas Monthly gave the restaurant a positive review, praising its " rich consommé, bursting with big chunks of stewed beef and so flavorful that you’ll end up spooning out every last bit."

The restaurant was recognized by the Michelin Guide in 2024.

== See also ==
- List of restaurants in Fort Worth, Texas
