= Ustilagic acid =

Ustilagic acid is an organic compound with the formula C_{36}H_{64}O_{18}. The acid is a cellobiose lipid produced by the corn smut fungus Ustilago maydis under conditions of nitrogen starvation. The acid was discovered in 1950 and was proved to be an amphipathic glycolipid with surface active properties. The name comes from Latin ustus which means burnt and refers to the scorched appearance of the smut fungi.

== Uses ==
Cellobiose lipids are known as biosurfactants and natural detergents. They can be used in pharmaceutical, cosmetic, and food applications and are known for their strong fungicidal activity on many species. The yeast Pseudozyma fusiformata and Pseudozyma graminicola secrete ustilagic acids, 2-O-3-hydroxyhexanoyl-beta-D-glucopyranosyl-(1→4)-6-O-acetyl-beta-D-glucopyranosyl-(1→16)-2,15,16- trihydroxyhexadecanoic acid. Similar compounds are the extracellular cellobiose lipids of the yeasts Cryptococcus humicola and Trichosporon porosum : 2,3,4-O-triacetyl-beta-D-glucopyranosyl-(1→4)-6-O-acetyl-beta-D-glucopyranosyl -(1→16)-2,16-dihydroxyhexadecanoic acid. These compounds inhibit the growth of quite a number of various species of yeast and fungi, including Candida albicans and Cryptococcus (Filobasidiella) neoformans. The antifungal activity manifested at acidic pH.
