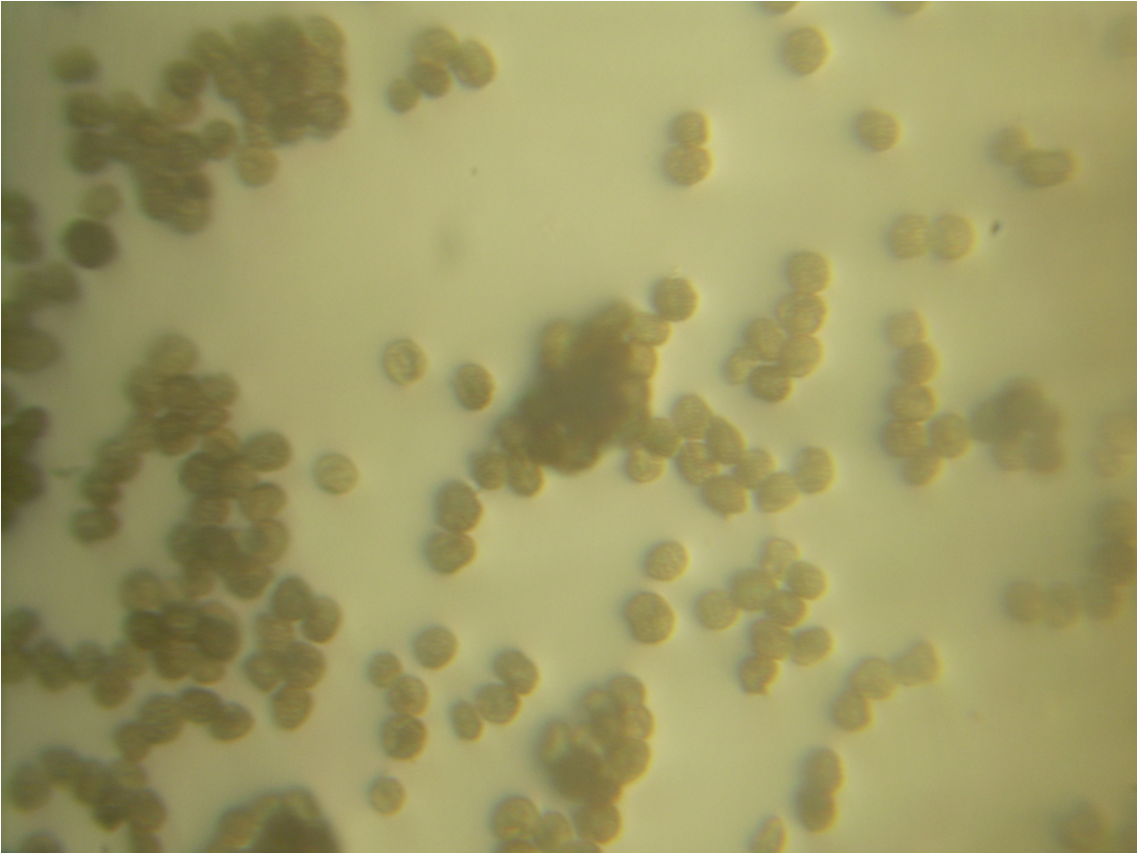
- Mycosarcoma maydis diploid teliospores

Scientific classification
- Kingdom: Fungi
- Division: Basidiomycota
- Class: Ustilaginomycetes
- Order: Ustilaginales
- Family: Ustilaginaceae
- Genus: Mycosarcoma; Brefeld, 1912

Type species
- Mycosarcoma maydis Brefeld, 1912

Species
- See text

= Mycosarcoma =

Genus of fungi

Mycosarcoma is a genus of fungus including Mycosarcoma maydis (synonym Ustilago maydis), or 'corn smut fungus'. Mycosarcoma was an old retired genus name that was resurrected in 2016, based on new genetic evidence, to better organize species that were previously thought unrelated. The six recognized species were in different genera originally until genetic testing showed their relations and they were reclassified as Mycosarcoma.

== Species ==
- Mycosarcoma aegyptiacum - no synonym, newly discovered
- Mycosarcoma bouriquetii - synonym Ustilago bouriquetii
- Mycosarcoma macklinlayi - synonym Macalpinomyces macklinlayi
- Mycosarcoma maydis - synonym Ustilago maydis
- Mycosarcoma pachycarpum - synonym Tolyposporella pachycarpa
- Mycosarcoma tubiforme - synonym Macalpinomyces tubiformis
