= Josefina Velázquez de León bibliography =

Bibliography of works by Mexican cook and author Josefina Velázquez de León

Mexican cook and author Josefina Velázquez de León wrote more than 140 cookbooks in her lifetime. This bibliography, which may not be complete, is based on Velázquez de León's works in the Mexican Cookbook Collection at The University of Texas at San Antonio Libraries Special Collections and works listed in WorldCat. Undated publications in this list were lacking dates in the original publication.

Title	Date	Publisher	Place of Publication	Notes
3 recetas de la ilustre profesora de cocina doña Josefina Velázquez de León				Recipes using Fuertomate brand canned tomatoes
8 menús económicos para las Vigilias de Cuaresma		Ediciones J. Velázquez de León	Mexico City	
12 industrias en el hogar: selección de fórmulas sencillas muy bien explicadas para establecer en cualquier hogar, en el campo o en la ciudad una industria familiar y lucrativa	1947	Academia de Cocina Velázquez de León	Mexico City	
Los 30 menús	1937		Mexico City	
30 recetas de platillos populares con harina de trigo	1960	Compañía Exportadora e Importadora Mexicana, S. A. (CEIMSA)	Mexico City	
30 recetas de platillos populares con leche	1960	CEIMSA	Mexico City	
30 recetas de platillos populares con pescado seco	1960	CEIMSA	Mexico City	
30 recetas de platillos populares mexicanos: camaron seco y en polvo.	1971	Compañia Nacional de Subsistencias Populares	Mexico City	Series: Recetario popular
30 recetas de platillos populares mexicanos con arroz	1960	CEIMSA	Mexico City	
30 recetas de platillos populares mexicanos con chiles	1960	CEIMSA	Mexico City	
30 recetas de platillos populares mexicanos con frijol	1960	CEIMSA	Mexico City	
30 recetas de platillos populares mexicanos con garbanzo	1960	CEIMSA	Mexico City	
30 recetas de platillos populares mexicanos con harina de maiz	1960	CEIMSA	Mexico City	
30 recetas de platillos populares mexicanos con huevo fresco	1960	CEIMSA	Mexico City	
30 recetas de platillos populares mexicanos con lentejas	1960	CEIMSA	Mexico City	
30 recetas de platillos populares mexicanos. Pan frio	1971	Compañia Nacional de Subsistencias Populares	Mexico City	Series: Recetario popular
30 recetas de platillos populares mexicanos. Pastas para sopa	1971	Compañia Nacional de Subsistencias Populares	Mexico City	Series: Recetario popular
30 recetas de platillos populares mexicanos: platillos para dias festivos	1960	CEIMSA	Mexico City	
50 recetas de cocina mexicana	1968	Comisión Federal de Electricidad Editorial	Mexico	
60 recetas populares-económicas de pescados y mariscos		Ediciones J. Velázquez de León	Mexico City	
100 recetas de cocina sencilla: al alcance de todas las amas de casa	1946	Ediciones J. Velázquez de León	Mexico City	
150 recetas		Industrializadora de Cacahuate	Mexico City	Recipes using the VITA-B brand peanut butter
Los 365 menus del año: recetas prácticas, económicas, para resolver el diario problema de la alimentación		Ediciones J. Velázquez de León	Mexico City	Set of twelve pamphlets: one for each month of the year
420 recetas de platillos populares mexicanos	1960	CEIMSA	Mexico City	
Antojitos mexicanos: selección de 100 recetas de los principales platillos de la cocina mexicana		Academia "Velázquez de Leon"	Mexico City	
El arte de cocinar			Mexico City	Monthly magazine edited and managed by Josefina Velázquez de León that was originally registered October 18, 1943.
Arte y decoración de pasteles		Editorial Academia de Cocina, Repostería y Decorado	Mexico City	
Aves: 30 maneras de prepararlas	1956	Ediciones J. Velázquez de León	Mexico City	
Bautizos		Academia de Cocina Velázquez de León	Mexico	Series: El Tesoro de la cocina colección fiestas económicas, folleto no. 2
Bodas de plata, oro, aniversarios		Ediciones J. Velázquez de León	Mexico City	
La buena cocina			Mexico City	Monthly magazine printed by Josefina Velázquez de León, who also served as the magazine's Technical Advisor.
Carnes frías		Ediciones J. Velázquez de León	Mexico City	
Carnes: recetas prácticas de platillos de carnes de res, ternera, cerdo, carnero y animales de caza	1956	Ediciones J. Velázquez de León	Mexico City	Second edition
Cena de Navidad		Ediciones J. Velázquez de León	Mexico City	
Cocina al minuto: Sugestiones, ideas prácticas para confeccionar rápidamente con latas y productos preparados platillos y repostería	1956	Ediciones J. Velázquez de León	Mexico City	
Cocina criolla de Nueva Orleans	1952	Ediciones J. Velázquez de León	Mexico	
Cocina de Aguascalientes: selección de recetas de la cocina regional, recopiladas por un grupo de Sras. y Sritas. de la Ciudad de Auascalientes y de diferentes regionaes del estado : aumentadas con una serie de recetas modernas que se pueden confeccionar con los buenos productos de la región	1957	Academia de Cocina Velázquez de León	Mexico City	
Cocina de América: selección de las principales recetas de cocina regionales de las 24 naciones de América; recetas de los mejores platillos de cocina y repostería de los 30 estados de la República Mexicana		Ediciones J. Velázquez de León	Mexico City	
Cocina de bolsillo: selección de recetas de cocina y repostería novedosas, prácticas, de fácil confección y bonita presentación		Academia de Cocina Velázquez de León	Mexico City	
Cocina de Campeche: selección de las principales recetas regionales, de cocina y repostería campechana, experimentadas y garantizadas por la Academia de Cocina Velázques de León	1953	Ediciones J. Velázquez de León	Mexico City	
Cocina de Chihuahua: selección de recetas auténticas de la cocina regional de Chihuahua, recopiladas por un grupo de señoras y señoritas de la Congregación Mariana: aumentada con una serie de recetas modernas que se pueden confeccionar con los buenos productos de la región		Ediciones J. Velázquez de León	Mexico City	
Cocina de la Comarca Lagunera: selección de recetas de la cocina regional de La Laguna, recopiladas por un grupo de Sras. y Sritas. de la Comarca Lagunera, aumentada con una serie de recetas modernas, que se pueden confeccionar con los buenos productos de la región	1957	Academia de Cocina Velázquez de León	Mexico City	Series: Libros de cocina, 79
Cocina de cuaresma		Ediciones J. Velázquez de León	Mexico City	
Cocina de Guanajuato		Ediciones J. Velázquez de León	Mexico City	
Cocina de León, Gto.: selección de recetas auténticas de la cocina regional	1959	Ediciones J. Velázquez de León	Mexico City	
La cocina del hogar: conteniendo las mas sencillas formulas para hacer los mas exquisitos vinos, dulces y pasteles: 150 recetas practicas		Imp. de E. Guerrero	Mexico	
La cocina de la recién casada	1951	Ediciones J. Velázquez de León	Mexico City	
Cocina de Nuevo León: selección de recetas auténticas de la cocina regional de Nuevo León, recopiladas por un grupo de sras. y sritas. de la ciudad de Monterrey, N.L., aumentada con una serie de recetas modernas, que se pueden confeccionar con los buenos productos de la región		Ediciones J. Velázquez de León	Mexico City	
Cocina de San Luis Potosí: selección de recetas de la cocina regional, recopiladas por un grupo de Sras. y Sritas. de las diferentes regiones del Estado de San Luis Potosi, S.L.P. : aumentada con una serie de recetas que se pueden confeccionar, con los exquisitos productos de la región	1957	Ediciones J. Velázquez de León	Mexico City	
Cocina de Sonora: selección de recetas antiguas y modernas de la Cocina Regional Sonorense, recopiladas por un grupo de Sras. y Sritas. de las diferentes regiones del Estado de Sonora. Aumentada con una serie de recetas que se pueden confeccionar con los exquisitos productos de la región	1958	Academia de Cocina Velázquez de León	Mexico	
Cocina de Zacatecas: selección de recetas de la cocina regional, recopiladas por un grupo de Sras. y Sritas de la ciudad de Zacatecas, Fresnillo y diversas poblaciones del estado : aumentada con una serie de recetas que se pueden confeccionar con los buenos productos de la regiâon	1957	Academia de Cocina y Reposterâia "Velázquez de León"	Mexico City	
La cocina económica: método práctico de cocina y repostería	1941	Academia de Cocina y Repostería "Velázquez de Léon"	Mexico City	
La cocina en el aire: selección de recetas exquisitas, útiles y prácticas ofrecidas en los diversos programas de radio en que tomé participación la autora en las estaciones: XEQ, XEK, XEJP y XEW de la ciudad de México	1947	Ediciones J. Velázquez de León	Mexico City	
La cocina española en México: selección de 75 recetas de platillos de la cocina española adaptados con los elementos de este país	1947	Academía de Cocina Velázquez de León	Mexico City	
Cocina instantanea	1949	Ediciones J. Velázquez de León	Mexico City	
Cocina mexicana de abolengo	1952	Academia Cocina y Repostería, Velázquez de León	Mexico City	
Cocina moderna en los aparatos modernos: explicaciones del manejo de la Batería Lamex, Horno Lamex, Asador Broil Quick Chef, Saladmaster, Licuadora Birtman: recetas de platillos y repostería, que se confeccionan rápidamente en los mismos aparatos		Ediciones J. Velázquez de León	Mexico City	
Cocina oaxaqueña		Ediciones J. Velazquez de Leon	Mexico City	
Cocina para enfermos	1968	Editorial Velázquez de León	Mexico	
Cocina Poblana	1952	Academia de cocina y repostería Velázquez de León	Mexico	
Cocina popular: 30 menús económicos compuestos de 3 platillos y un postre		Ediciones J. Velázquez de León	Mexico City	
Cocina rapida para la mujer moderna		Ediciones J. Velázquez de León	Mexico City	
Cocina regional de Michoacan: selección de las mejores recetas auténticas de la antigua cocina y repostería michoacana	1952	Ediciones J. Velázquez de León	Mexico City	
Cocina regional jalisciense	1952	Ediciones J. Velázquez de León	Mexico City	
Cocina, repostería y decorado		Ediciones J. Velázquez de León	Mexico City	
Cocina selecta: selección de recetas, novedosas de cocina y repostería	1956	Academia de Cocina y Reposteria Velázquez de León	Mexico City	
Cocina tamaulipeca: selección de recetas de la cocina regional recopiladas por un grupo de Sras. y Sritas. de la ciudad de Tampico y de diferentes regiones del estado de Tamaulipas, aumentada con una serie de recetas modernas que se pueden confeccionar con los exquisitos pescados, mariscos y demás productos de la región	1957	Ediciones J. Velázquez de León	Mexico City	
Cocina veracruzana de abolengo: seleccion de las mejores recetas de la autentica cocina veracruzana de abolengo, recopiladas por un grupo de señoras y señoritas de la Ciudad de Veracruz	1966	Academia de Cocina Velázquez de León	Mexico City	This publication raised money for the construction of el Seminario Diócesano de San Jose in Veracruz
Cocina y repostería navideña		Academia de Cocina Velazquez de León	Mexico City	
Cocina yucateca	1955	Academia de Cocina Velázquez de León	Mexico City	Second edition
Cocktails: seleccion de recetas de cocktails, de vinos, de mariscos y de frutas		Ediciones Josefina Velázquez de León	Mexico City	
Coleccione el fabuloso libro de cocina Bona Fina		Bona Fina	Mexico	
Cómo alimentar y festejar al niño: explicaciónes sencillas y prácticas para preparar la primera alimentación del niño: recetas de platillos y pasteles propios para servirse en bautizos, primeras comuniónes y fiestas de cumpleaños de niños	1951	Ediciones J. Velázquez de León	Mexico City	
Cómo aprovechar los sobrantes de la comida: selección de 80 recetas prácticas y económicas que permiten aprovechar sobrantes de comida de la víspera, para convertirlos en diferentes y apetitosos platillos	1950		Mexico	
Cómo cocinar en los aparatos modernos		Ediciones J. Velázquez de León	Mexico City	
Cómo cocinar en tiempos de carestía	1951	Academia de Cocina Velazquez de Leon	Mexico City	
Cómo desayunar, comer y cenar bien	1989	Editorial Universo	Mexico City	
Cómo improvisar fiestas		Ediciones J. Velázquez de León	Mexico	Series: El Tesoro de la cocina colección fiestas económicas, folleto no. 10
Cómo preparar exquisitos platillos y repostería con la nata de la leche		Ediciones J. Velázquez de León	Mexico City	
Despedida de soltera		Ediciones J. Velázquez de León	Mexico City	Series: El Tesoro de la cocina colección fiestas económicas, folleto no. 6
Dulces mexicanos: selección de recetas de los mejores dulces mexicanos: dulces chicos, jamoncillos, alfajores, mueganos, rollos, toda clase de ates y dulces cubiertos	1947	Ediciones J. Velázquez de León	Mexico City	
Ensaladas y aves	1989	Editorial Universo	Colonia del Valle, Mexico City	
Entremeses y botanas		Ediciones J. Velazquez de Leon	Mexico	
Especialidades de la Academia Josefina Velázquez de León: recetas selectas de cocina y repostería		Ediciones J. Velázquez de León	Mexico City	
Especialidades mexicanas (con maíz): seleccioń de platillos confeccionados con maíz, atoles, tamales, repostería, postres	1956	Academia de Cocina y Repostería Velázquez de León	Mexico City	Series: Libros de cocina, 74
Especialidades para el Día de las Madres		Ediciones J. Velázquez de León	Mexico City	
Especialidades para Navidad, Fin de Año y Día de Reyes	1946	Ediciones J. Velázquez de León	Mexico City	
Fiestas de 15 años		Ediciones Josefina Velázquez de León	Mexico City	
Fiestas para niños		Ediciones Josefina Velazquez de Leon	Mexico City	
Fuertomate en la cocina, recetario núm. 1				Recipes calling for Fuertomate brand canned tomatoes
Galletas y pastitas		Ediciones J. Velázquez de León	Mexico City	
Huevos, 30 recetas para prepararlos	1956	Academia de Cocina y Reposteria	Mexico	
Jaletinas: selección de 80 recetas de jaletinas: jaletinas chicas de jugos de fruta, de leche: jaletinas de ternera para niños y enfermos: jaletinas comerciales a base de esencias: jaletinas grandes, artisticas con flores, figuras de medio relieve y paisajes pintados	1947	Ediciones J. Velázquez de León	Mexico City	
Libro de cocina arreglado a los usos y costumbres nacionales		Imp. de E. Guerrero	Mexico	Series: Libro de cocina, 4
Libro de cocina mexicana para el hogar americano : recetas de la cocina mexicana de cada región de la república, adaptadas para su uso en los Estados Unidos del Norte y las repúblicas del Centro y Sur América [Mexican cook book for American homes : authentic recipes from every region of the Mexican Republic, adapted for use in the United States, Central and South America]	1947	Escuela de Cocina "Velázquez de León"	Mexico City	Bilingual: English and Spanish
El libro numero 100: selección de las recetas de platillos que se han dado últimamente en la Academia y que han agradado más a las alumnas		Ediciones J. Velázquez de León	Mexico City	
Lista de los artículos que se encuentran de venta en la Academia de Cocina y Repostería Velázquez de León	1945	La Academia	Mexico City	
Manual práctico de cocina	1936	Academia Calrod	Mexico City	
Mariscos y crustaceos	1952	Academia de Cocina Velazquez de Leon	Mexico City	
Las mejores recetas de cocina y reposteria de la Academia de cocina Velazquez de León: seleccion de las recetas de platillos y reposteria que mas han agradado a las alumnas de la Academia		Academia de cocina y repostería Velazquez de Leon	Mexico City	
Método práctico de cocina y repostería de la Academia de la Cocina "Velázquez de León": el A.B.C. de la cocina: método práctico conteniendo las bases de la cocina y repostería	1957	Academia de Cocina Velázquez de León	Mexico City	
Método práctico de decorado artístico. No. 2, Flores de glass		Ediciones J. Velázquez de León	Mexico City	
Nieves y helados	1947	Ediciones J. Velázquez de León	Mexico City	
Pan estilo chino	1946	Ediciones J. Velázquez de León	Mexico City	
Panes de levadura	1946	Ediciones J. Velázquez de León	Mexico City	
Pasteles americanos		Ediciones J. Velázquez de León	Mexico City	
Pasteles artísticos: recetas de pasteles artisticamente decorados; 50 laminas a colores	1949	Academia de Cocina Velázquez de León	Mexico	
Pasteles economicos		Ediciones J. Velázquez de León	Mexico City	Brochure raised money for la R.R. Madres Capuchinas Eucaristícas de la Adoración Perpetua in Tampico
Pasteles modernos: al alcance de todas las amas de casa, selección de pasteles sencillos, económicos con decorados modernos de mucho lucimiento	1952	Ediciones J. Velázquez de León	Mexico City	
Pasteles practicos	1966	Ediciones J. Velázquez de León	Mexico City	
Pasteles y jaletinas para niños		Ediciones J. Velázquez de León	Mexico City	
Pescados	1952	Academia de Cocina Velázqez de León	Mexico	
Pescados y mariscos		Ediciones J. Velázquez de León	Mexico City	Series: El Tesoro de la cocina, Colección económica
Platillos de verduras		Ediciones J. Velázquez de León	Mexico City	Series: El Tesoro de la cocina, Colección económica, folleto no. 14
Platillos de vigilia	1947	Academia de cocina Velazquez de León	Mexico City	
Platillos para buffet		Ediciones J. Velázquez de León		Series: El Tesoro de la cocina, Colección económica, folleto no. 3
Platillos para canasta		Ediciones J. Velázquez de León	Mexico City	
Platillos para lunch		Ediciones J. Velázquez de León	Mexico City	
Platillos populares mexicanos		Grupo Editorial de la Compañia Nacional de Subsistencias Populares	Mexico	The chapters in this book were originally published as separate pamphlets.
Platillos regionales de la República Mexicana	1946	Ediciones J. Velázquez de León	Mexico City	
Postres antiguos Mexicanos	1947	Ediciones J. Velázquez de León	Mexico City	
Practica de decorado de pasteles en 100 lecciones		Ediciones J. Velázquez de León	Mexico City	
Primeras comuniónes		Ediciones J. Velázquez de León	Mexico City	Series: El Tesoro de la cocina colección fiestas económicas, folleto no. 4; Brochure raised money for la R.R. Madres Capuchinas Eucaristícas de la Adoración Perpetua in Tampico
Principios de decorado artístico: Decorado lineal sencillo		Academia de Cocina Velázquez De León	Mexico City	Series: Colec. económica, Productos oro, no. 1
Principios de decorado artístico: Flores de glass		Academia de Cocina Velázquez De León	Mexico City	Series: Colec. económica, Productos oro, no. 2
Principios de decorado artístico: Flores de pastillaje		Academia de Cocina Velázquez De León	Mexico City	Series: Colec. económica, Productos oro, no. 3
Principios de decorado artístico: Figuras de filigrana de glass		Academia de Cocina Velázquez De León	Mexico City	Series: Colec. económica, Productos oro, no. 4
Principios de decorado artístico: Adornos de pasta de almendra		Academia de Cocina Velázquez De León	Mexico City	Series: Colec. económica, Productos oro, no. 5
Principios de decorado artístico: Adornos de pastillaje		Academia de Cocina Velázquez De León	Mexico City	Series: Colec. económica, Productos oro, no. 6
Principios de decorado artístico: Piezas grandes de pastillaje, casas, iglesias, etc.		Academia de Cocina Velázquez De León	Mexico City	Series: Colec. económica, Productos oro, no. 7
Principios de decorado artístico: Figuras de medio relieve		Academia de Cocina Velázquez De León	Mexico City	Series: Colec. económica, Productos oro, no. 8
Principios de decorado artístico: Figuras de vaciado de fondant		Academia de Cocina Velázquez De León	Mexico City	Series: Colec. económica, Productos oro, no. 9
Principios de decorado artístico: Muñecas de pastillaje		Academia de Cocina Velázquez De León	Mexico City	Series: Colec. económica, Productos oro, no. 10
Una receta económica para cada día del mes	1966	Ediciones J. Velázquez de León	Mexico City	
Recetario de cocina		Cinco Estrellas Internacional	Mexico City	
Recetario Gelifrut para gelatinas		Ediciones J. Velázquez de León	Mexico City	
Recetario moderno de cocina y repostería		Ediciones Josefina Velázquez de León	Mexico City	
Recetario TURMIX para carnes asadas		TURMIX de México	Mexico City	
Recetas novedosas para fiestas de niños		Ediciones Velázquez de León	Mexico City	
Recetas Termo-Vap: que engorda al bebé y adelgaza a la mamá				
Repostería alemana y vienesa	1951	Ediciones J. Velázquez de León	Mexico City	
Repostería casera	1946	Ediciones J. Velázquez de León	Mexico City	
Reposteria moderna	1946	Ediciones J. Velázquez de León	Mexico City	Series: Libro de oro de las amas de casa, Coleccion de 30 folletos, no. 2
Reposteria navideña	1956	Ediciones Josefina Velázquez de León	Mexico City	
Repostería selecta: el arte de hacer pasteles	1938	Academia de Cocina y Repostería "Velázquez de León"	Mexico	
Salchichonería casera	1946	Ediciones Velázquez de León	Mexico City	
Salsas mexicanas: selección de recetas de salsas mexicanas, moles, pipianes, otros platillos y bebidas para acompañar salsas y moles	1966	Ediciones Josefina Velazquez de Leon	Mexico City	
Sandwichs	1946	Academia Cocina, Reposteria y Decorado, "Velazquez de Leon"	Mexico City	
Selección de recetas de cocina sencilla de alta cocina y reposteria		Ediciones Josefina Velázquez de León	Mexico City	
Smörgåsbord: platillos para buffet	1952	Ediciones J. Velázquez de León	Mexico City	
Sopas y consomes	1946	Ediciones J. Velázquez de León	Mexico City	
Sugestiones para su mesa	1956	Ediciones J. Velázquez de León	Mexico City	
Tamales y atoles	1946	Ediciones J. Velázquez de León	Mexico City	
Tele-cocina		Ediciones J. Velázquez de León	Mexico City	Series of brochures containing recipes from Velázquez de León's television program "El Menu de la Semana"
Vegetales y frutas, con leguminosas y cereales: cocina vegetariana excluyendo carnes-aves y pescados	1946	Ediciones J. Velázquez de León	Mexico City	
