= Josefina Velázquez de León =

Mexican cook, researcher, writer and teacher

- Cover of the book "Tele-cocina" by Josefina Velázquez de León.
- Born: June 7, 1899; Aguascalientes, Mexico, North America
- Died: September 21, 1968 (aged 69); Mexico City, State of Mexico, Mexico, North America
- Occupations: Author; cook; publisher; radio host; researcher; teacher; television host
- Spouse: Joaquín González
- Writing career
- Genre: Cookbooks

Josefina Velázquez de León (born Maria Josefina Velázquez de León y Peón Valdés; June 7, 1899 – September 21, 1968) was a Mexican cook, researcher, writer and teacher. Velázquez de León was a pioneer of Mexican gastronomy and an entrepreneur of Mexican cuisine.

== Early life and family ==
On June 7, 1899, Josefina Velázquez de León was born in Aguascalientes, the oldest of four daughters. Her mother was María Peón Valdés, a member of a socially prominent family from Guadalajara. Her father was Luis Velázquez de León, whose family was one of the most distinguished families in Mexico—dating back to the conquistador Diego Velázquez de Cuéllar.
Velázquez de León married businessman Joaquín González on October 24, 1930. Eleven months later, González died. The two had no children together and Velázquez de León never remarried.

== Career ==
During the 1930s, Velázquez de León published recipes in the Poblano publication Mignon Magazine. These recipes were focused on home cooking and giving guidelines to women about how to start a small home business. This experience led her to form the Velázquez de León Cooking Academy by the end of the decade. In the cooking school, Velázquez de León traveled to various states of the country promoting a national gastronomy proposal based on the relationship between good eating, family spending, nutrition, history, and regional cuisine. Velázquez de León promoted a revaluation of home cooking in addition to classifying and cataloging the diversity of dishes of national cuisine. In her cooking classes she taught modules and subjects such as: daily simple cooking, modern cooking, haute cuisine, simple baking, artistic jellies, and Mexican specialties.

In 1936, Velázquez published her first cookbook Manual practico de cocina.

By 1937, Velázquez started her publishing house, Ediciones J. Velázquez de León, which was dedicated exclusively to publishing Mexican and international cookbooks and periodicals. Publications were distributed through correspondence, sending classes to students in other states by mail until the 1960s, making her a pioneer in this field. Her work Platillos regionales de la República Mexicana (1946) highlighted the culinary identity and characteristics of the food from the then 29 Mexican states. In her book, Cómo cocinar en los aparatos modernos (1949), she updated cooking techniques by teaching how to cook in Presto's express cooker, Ekco's miracle oven, and Oster's and Sunbeam's electric mixers. Velázquez de León ultimately published more than 140 cookbooks across her career.

Cover of the book "La cocina en el aire" by Josefina Velázquez de León.

In addition to publishing, Velázquez ventured into radio and television broadcasting. In February 1946, she launched her daily radio show La flojera en la cocina on station XEW. She also created programming for other Mexico City radio stations (specifically XEQ, XEK, and XEJP), and she eventually compiled many of the featured recipes into a book entitled La cocina en el aire. In the early 1950s, she developed the first cooking program for Mexican television, entitled El Menu de la Semana. As with her radio program, El Menu de la Semana resulted in publications, namely a series of Tele-cocina booklets.

Velázquez stated her motto: "saber cocinar es la base de la economía" ("knowing how to cook is the basis of the economy")

Upon the death of Velázquez, her sisters attempted to carry on her legacy, but eventually the Velázquez de León Cooking Academy closed its doors, and the rights to her books were sold.

== Legacy ==
Some of the Velázquez de León Cooking Academy students went on to have successful culinary careers, including Josefina Howard. Many famous chefs have been influenced by Velázquez de León's work. It was Velázquez de León's documentation of regional cuisines that first inspired Diana Kennedy to travel around Mexico documenting traditional recipes. Rick Bayless was similarly inspired by her work stating that Velázquez de León "gave a national face to regional Mexican cuisine. She carried a banner that said, ‘We’re all Mexican: Veracruz Mexican, Oaxacan Mexican, Yucatecan Mexican.'”

Several notable libraries with Mexican gastronomy collections hold Velázquez de León's works. Among these collections are the Fundación Herdez "Josefina Velázquez de León" collection, the University of New Mexico's Josefina Velázquez de León cookery collection, and The University of Texas at San Antonio Libraries Special Collections' Mexican Cookbook Collection.

== See also ==
- Josefina Velázquez de León bibliography

== Bibliography ==
- Velázquez de León, Josefina (1946). Platillos regionales de la República Mexicana. Mexico City: Ediciones J. Velázquez de León.
- Velázquez de León, Josefina (1947). Mexican cook book devoted to the American homes: recipes of Mexican cookery of each region of the Mexican country, adopting its ingredients, to the elements that can be substituted in the northern part of the United States, Central Republic and South America, written in two languages: English and Spanish. Mexico City: Escuela de Cocina "Velázquez de León", 68 Abraham Gonzalez Street.
