= Darío Rubio =

Mexican scholar, philologist, writer

- Born: December 8, 1878; Mineral de la Luz, Guanajuato
- Died: January 21, 1952 (aged 73); Mexico City
- Occupation: Philologist

Darío Rubio (Mineral de la Luz, Guanajuato, December 8, 1878 – Mexico City, January 21, 1952), was a Mexican scholar and philologist, specializing in the study of paremiology, Mexican Spanish and popular speech. He made some publications under the pseudonym Ricardo del Castillo.

He did his first studies in his native state. He moved to Mexico City, where he worked for various companies, including the Nacional Monte de Piedad. Becoming interested in paremiology and popular speech, he wrote articles for various periodical publications. On October 23, 1918, he was elected corresponding member of the Mexican Academy of Language, and becoming a full member, taking possession of Chair V, on July 20, 1927, with the speech —“The Mexican Popular Language”— to which Victoriano Salado Álvarez responded. He was secretary of the institution from 1931 and treasurer from 1934, until his death on January 21, 1952 in Mexico City.

== Published Works ==
- Pierrot: ensayo dramático, 1909.
- Ligeras reflexiones acerca de nuestro teatro nacional, 1912.
- Los llamados mexicanismos de la Academia española, 1917.
- Nahuatlismos y barbarismos, 1919.
- El jaripeo, 1920.
- La anarquía del lenguaje en la América española, 1925.
- Refranes, proverbios y dichos y dicharachos mexicanos, two volumes, 1925 and 1940.
- El Nacional Monte de Piedad: fundado en el año de 1775, 1947.
- El pobrecito señor X. La oruga, under the pseudonym, Ricardo del Castillo.
