= Quesabirria =

Mexican dish

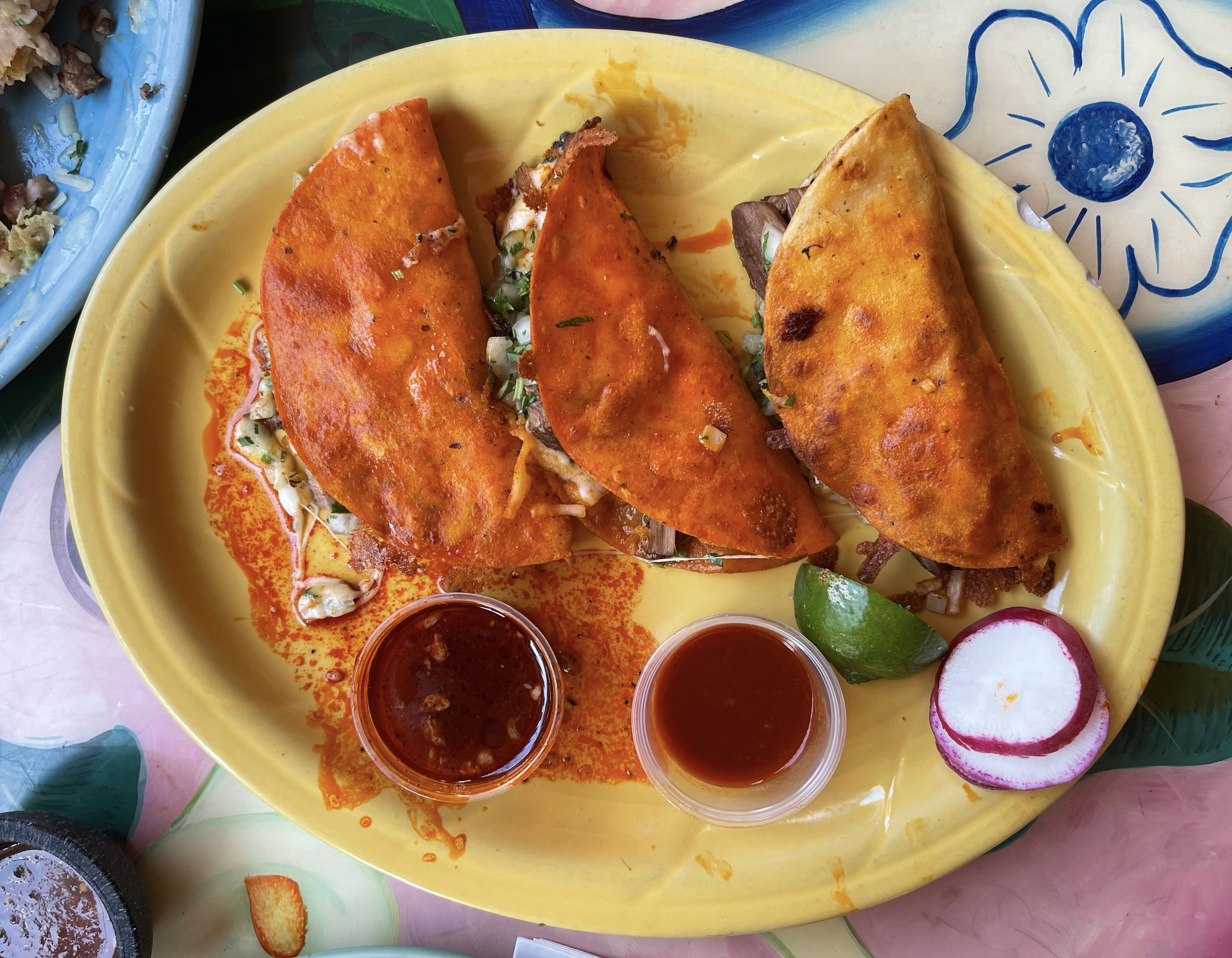
- Quesabirria with consommé at Taqueria La Hacienda in Sonoma, California
- Alternative names: Birria taco Red taco
- Type: Taco
- Course: Main
- Place of origin: Mexico
- Region or state: Tijuana
- Serving temperature: Hot
- Main ingredients: Beef, consommé, cheese, tortilla
- Variations: Birria

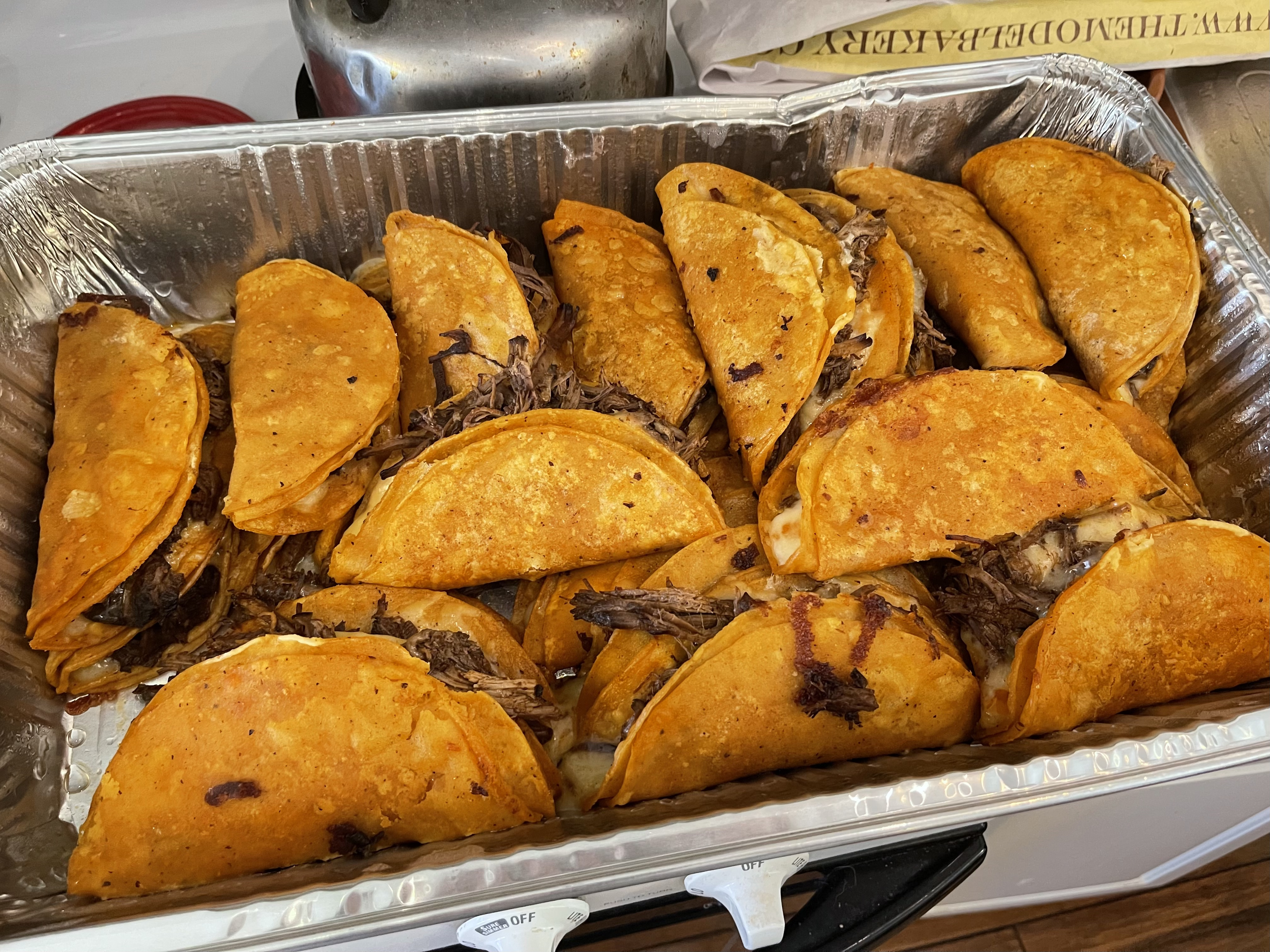
A corn tortilla stuffed with beef, lamb, or goat meat and mozzarella cheese.

Quesabirria ('cheese birria') (also called birria tacos or red tacos) is a Mexican dish comprising birria-style cooked beef folded into a tortilla with melted cheese and served with a side of broth (Spanish: consomé) for dipping. The dish has origins in Tijuana, Mexico, where it was originally made with goat meat, and gained popularity in the United States through Instagram. It is now made also with other meats, such as beef and chicken.

== History ==
Quesabirria was created in Tijuana, Mexico. The dish is inspired by the traditional birria stew of Jalisco. California food writer Bill Esparza saw birria being served in tacos at a taco truck called Tacos Aaron in Tijuana around 2009. Other taco trucks added cheese to the birria taco.

Tijuana taqueros brought quesabirria to Los Angeles around 2016. Taqueros and diners began posting about quesabirria on Instagram. Eater credits Instagram with helping quesabirria go "from a handful of vendors serving a regional specialty to a full-fledged phenomenon." Instagram and TikTok helped make quesabirria, which is not commonly found at taquerias or Mexican restaurants, a cult food.

In 2019, taqueros in the San Francisco Bay Area took note of the popularity of the dish on social media and began serving it. Quesabirria purveyors also host pop-ups at bars and breweries. In 2023 Del Taco Restaurants started to serve quesabirria tacos as fast food.

== Preparation and variations ==
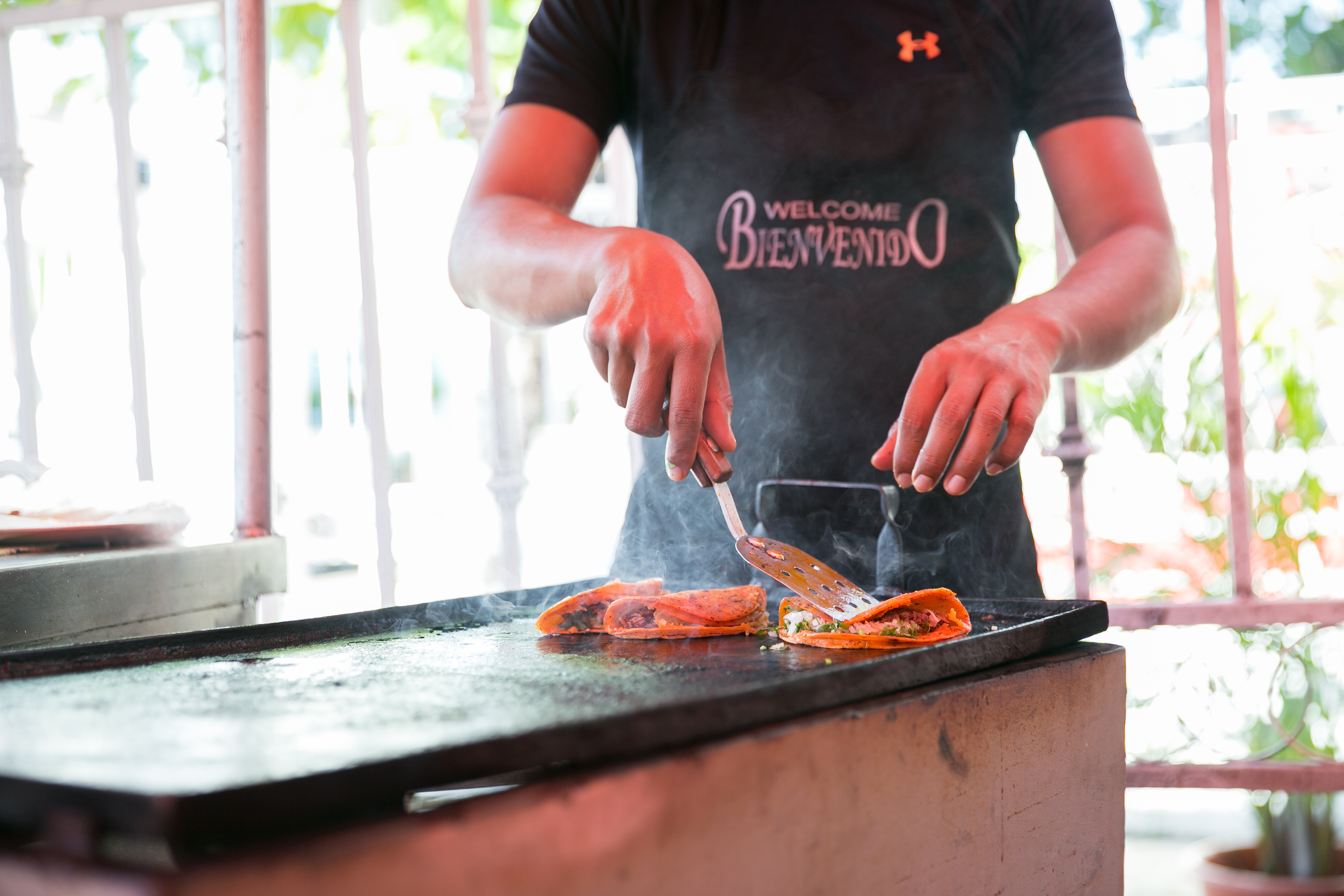
A taquero preparing quesabirria in Playa del Carmen, Mexico, in 2016

Quesabirria is "a cross between a taco and a quesadilla." It comprises stewed meat and melted mozzarella or Chihuahua cheese, cooked inside a corn tortilla that has been dipped in the flavorful fat leftover from the stewing process. The meat is often beef – commonly brisket – in contrast to birria, which is traditionally made with goat. The meat is stewed for up to 10 hours with chilies and spices. The tortilla is folded over on a grill, melting the cheese, meat and tortilla together. Some taqueros serve quesabirria with chopped white onion and cilantro inside the tacos or as a topping. Some taqueros use two tortillas on the grill to prepare their quesabirria, while others use two tortillas which they fry prior to adding the cheese and meat.

The dish is served hot with a side of consomé broth for the diner to dip the taco. The consomé is the result of hours of stewing the meat used in the tacos. Some diners may sip the consomé instead of dipping. Quesabirria may also be served with optional salsas and garnishes like pickled habaneros, lime or radish.

Variations on quesabirria include vampiritos, a version that uses crispy cheese atop or instead of tortillas, and birraquiles, tortilla chips topped with birria, cheese and consomé. Some vendors vary the fillings, such as using lamb or jackfruit, or use flour tortillas. Some restaurants offer tortas and tostadas made in the style of quesabirria.

== Gallery ==
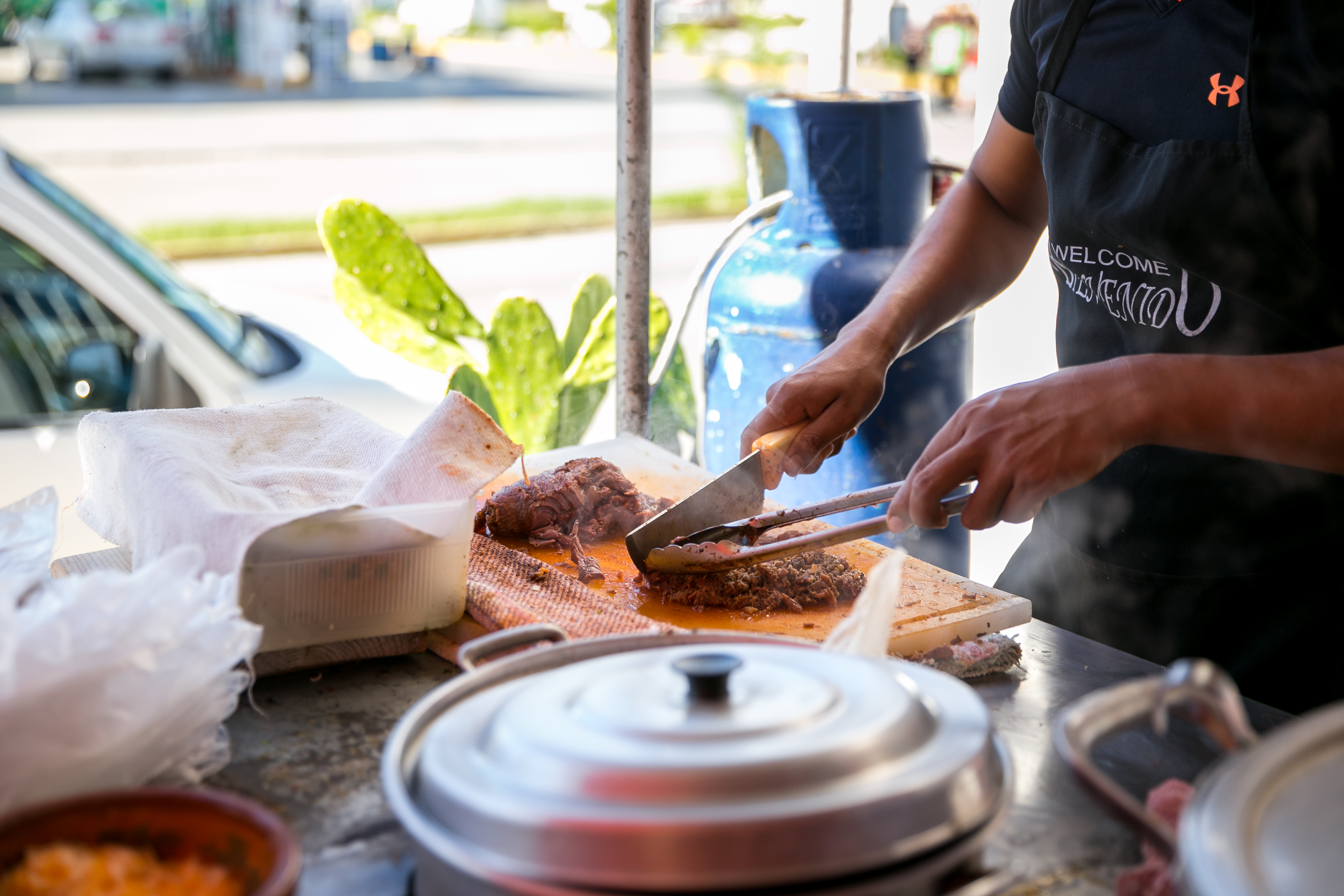
A taquero preparing birria meat in Mexico

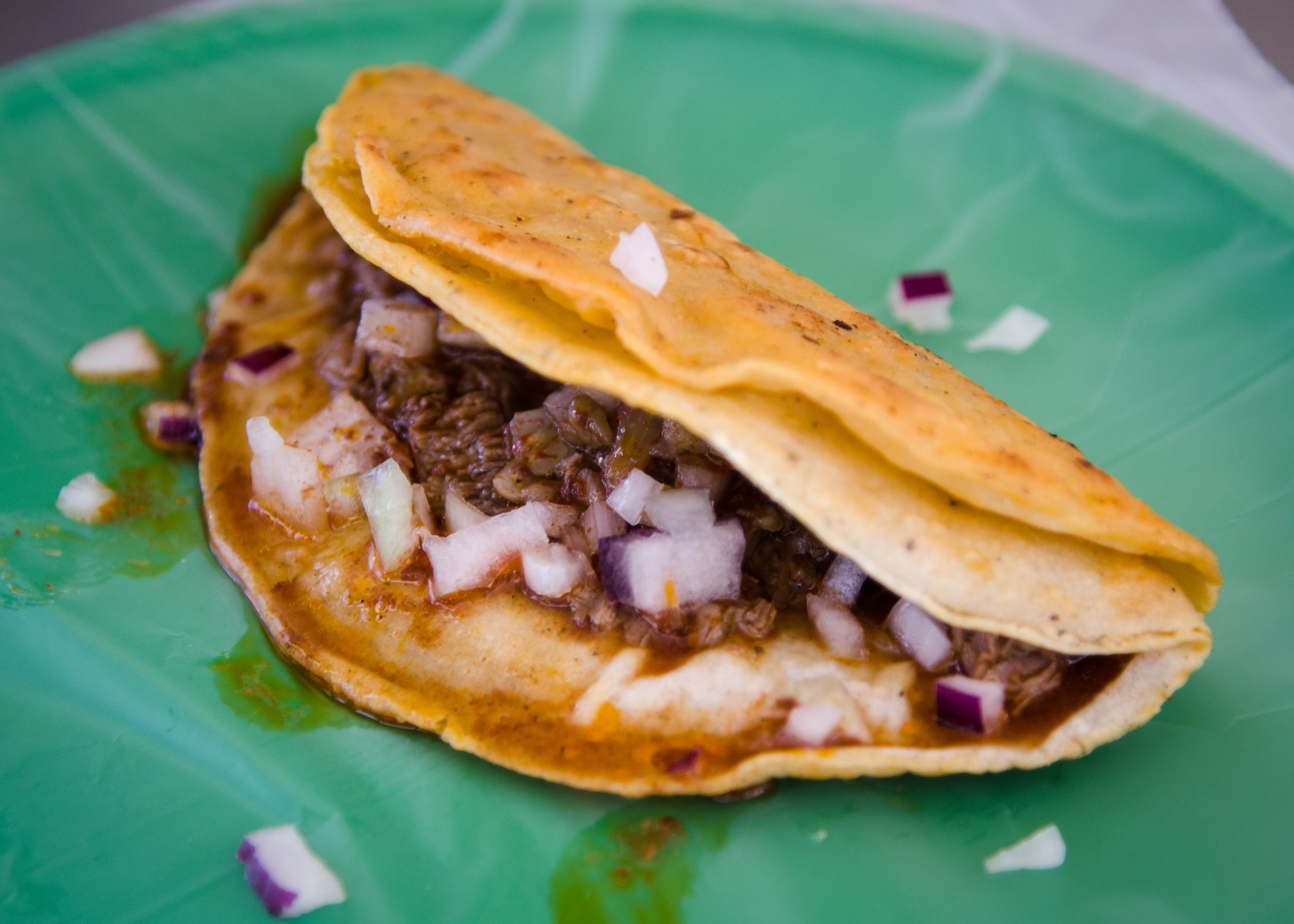
Quesabirria with onions
