= Josefina Howard =

Cuban-born Spanish chef and restauranteur

Josefina Howard was a Cuban-born Spanish chef and restaurateur who helped popularise regional Mexican cuisine in New York. She founded a chain of restaurants called Rosa Mexicano, which was described in 1993 as "one of the few luxury Mexican restaurants in New York", and Howard was credited with bringing the "real elegance of Mexican food - its refined international flavour" to New York.

Howard was born in Cuba to Spanish parents and grew up in Asturias, Spain. Both her father and paternal grandmother were killed by both sides during the Spanish Civil War.

She later moved to Mexico, where she lived for over twenty years, then moved to the United States. There, Howard's eatery La Fogata caught the attention of Jerry Stein, and she later closed it to open a New York City-based joint venture, the Cinco de Mayo restaurant, with Stein in January 1983. She founded the first Rosa Mexicano restaurant in 1984 in New York City. In 1996, she and Placido Domingo opened La Cava de Domingo, also in New York. By May 1997, La Cava de Domingo had closed. The next year, Howard suffered a stroke, but remained involved in opening new Rosa Mexicano franchises. Though Rosa Mexicano has often been described as serving authentic and regional Mexican food, Howard stated in 1986 that the success of such dishes was "...never 100 percent, but it's as good as it can be outside Mexico." As a chef, Howard was best known for serving huitlacoche.

Howard was also a photographer, who had an exhibition of her work at the Mexican Cultural Institute in New York in 1996.

In January 1998, Howard taped an appearance on Martha Stewart Living. Later that year, her book ROSA MEXICANO: A Culinary Autobiography was published by Viking Press. Howard died in 2005.
