= Borneo lowland rain forests =

Ecoregion in Borneo

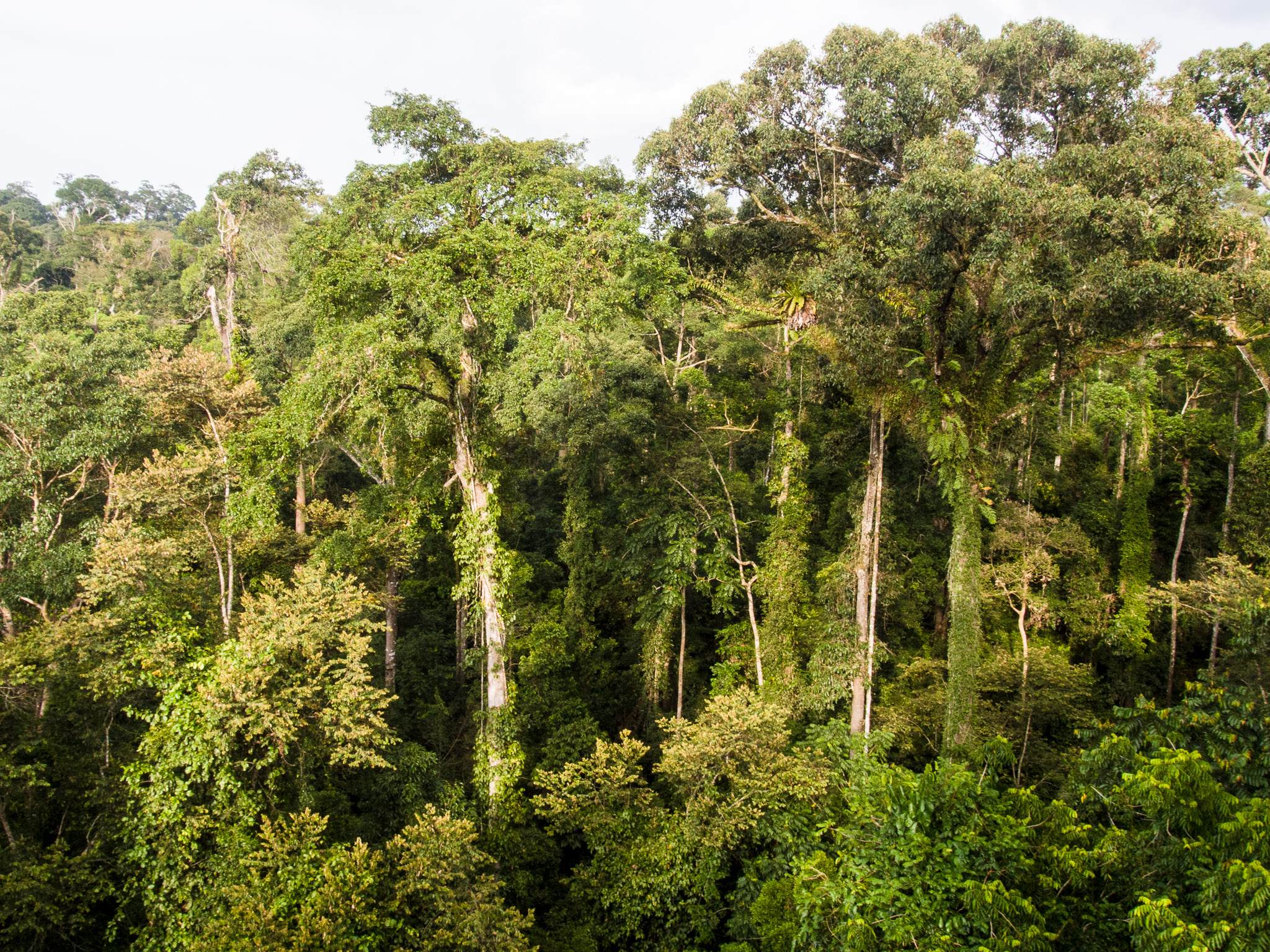
- Primary lowland forest at Danum Valley, Sabah

- Map of the Borneo lowland rain forests ecoregion

Ecology
- Realm: Indomalayan
- Biome: tropical and subtropical moist broadleaf forests
- Borders: List: Borneo montane rain forests; Borneo peat swamp forests; Southwest Borneo freshwater swamp forests; Sunda Shelf mangroves; Sundaland heath forests

Geography
- Area: 425,124 km^{2} (164,141 mi^{2})
- Countries: Brunei; Indonesia; Malaysia

Conservation
- Conservation status: vulnerable, nature could reach half protected
- Protected: 6.267%

The Borneo lowland rain forests is an ecoregion, within the tropical and subtropical moist broadleaf forests biome, of the large island of Borneo in Southeast Asia. It supports approximately 15,000 plant species, 380 bird species and several mammal species. The Borneo lowland rain forests is diminishing due to logging, hunting and conversion to commercial land use.

== Location and description ==
The Borneo lowland rain forests cover an area of 428,438 square kilometers, about 57% of Borneo's land area. They cover most of the island below 1000 meters elevation. Borneo is divided between Indonesia, Malaysia, and Brunei, and the lowland rainforests extend into all three countries.

Other ecoregions cover portions of lowland Borneo, including the Borneo peat swamp forests, Southwest Borneo freshwater swamp forests, and Sundaland heath forests. These other lowland ecoregions formed over specific soil conditions, and are home to distinct communities of plants and animals. The Sunda Shelf mangroves fringe the island's shores.

The highlands of Borneo are home to the Borneo montane rain forests, which are distinct from the lowland forests in both forest structure and species composition.

The lowlands are distinguished by climate (as the eastern side of the island is drier) or separated by the large Kapuas River and Barito River, which prevent animals and reptiles from spreading freely around the island.

== Climate ==
Lowland Borneo has a stable tropical wet climate, with monthly rainfall exceeding 200 millimetres (7.9 in) throughout the year, and a temperature that rarely varies by more than 10°C.

== Flora ==
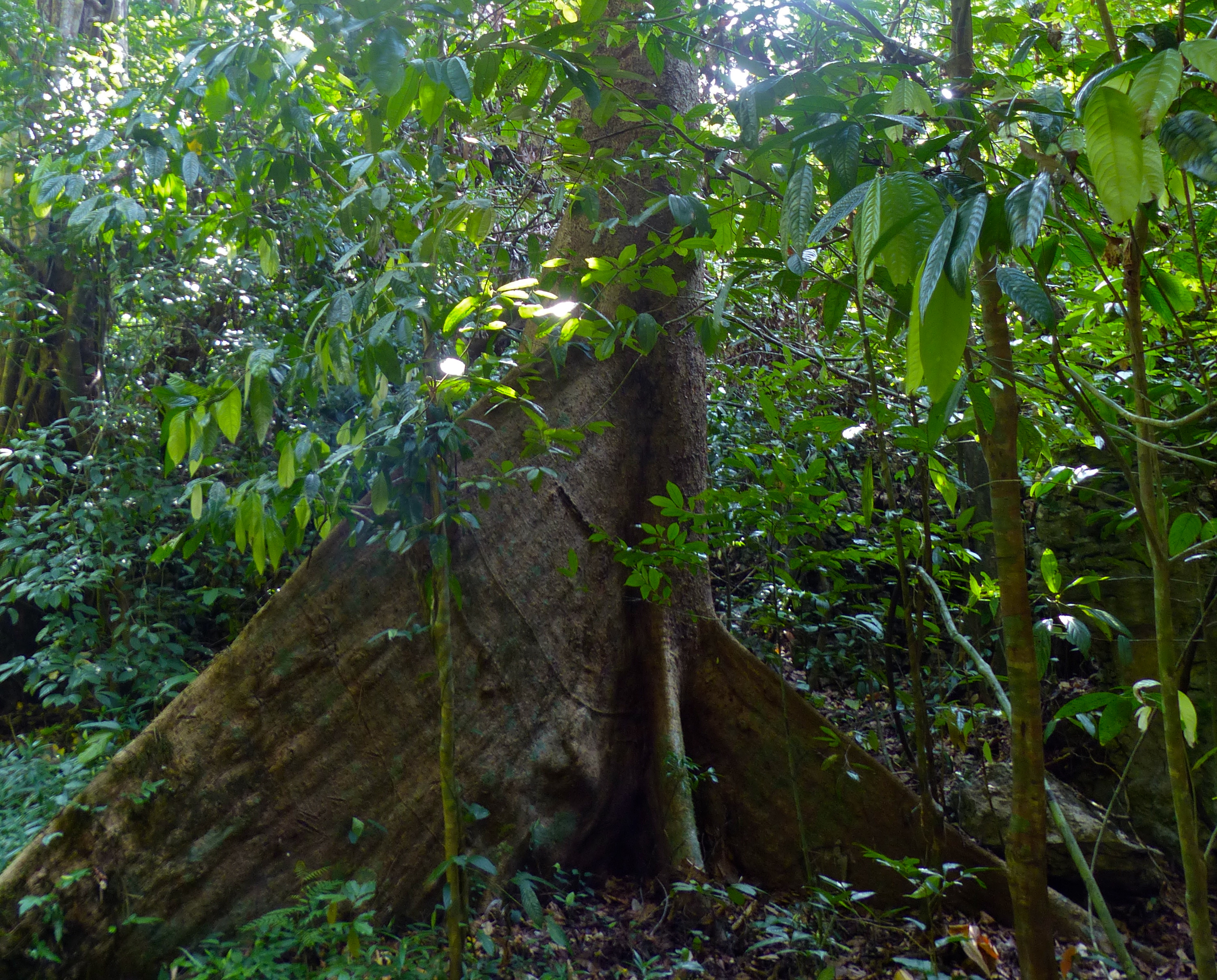
Benuang in the Niah National Park, Sarawak

The lowlands of Borneo are home to the richest rainforest in the world. The climate provides an ideal growing environment for approximately 10,000 species of plant (more than in the whole continent of Africa). Among these are some 2,000 species of orchids and 3,000 species of trees, including 267 species of dipterocarps (family Dipterocarpaceae), of which 155 are endemic to Borneo. This makes the island the center of the world's diversity for dipterocarps.

Mixed dipterocarp forests, including lowland and hill forests, are the predominant plant community. The forests have a closed canopy 24 to 36 meters high, with emergent trees up to 65 meters tall extending above the canopy. Dipterocarps are the most common emergents, comprising up to 80% of the emergent stratum. The dipterocarp genera Dipterocarpus, Dryobalanops, and Shorea are typically emergents, while the dipterocarp genera Hopea and Vatica are common canopy trees. Koompassia excelsa (Fabaceae) is an emergent tree with a distinctive white trunk that can reach up to 85 meters high. Trees from the plant families Burseraceae and Sapotaceae are also common in the canopy.

There is an understorey stratum under the canopy, composed of shade-tolerant trees draped with lianas and epiphytic orchids and ferns. Understorey trees are commonly of the plant families Euphorbiaceae, Rubiaceae, Annonaceae, Lauraceae, and Myristicaceae. Cauliflory – trees which bear flowers and fruits on their trunks – is common among understorey trees, including the forest durian (Durio testudinarius). Forest floor plants include five species of the strong-smelling parasite Rafflesia, one of which, Rafflesia arnoldii, has flowers over a metre wide, making it the world's largest flower.

The limestone uplands of the Sangkulirang Peninsula and Sarawak support their own particular plant communities, as do the Labi Hills on the Brunei-Sarawak border.

== Fauna ==
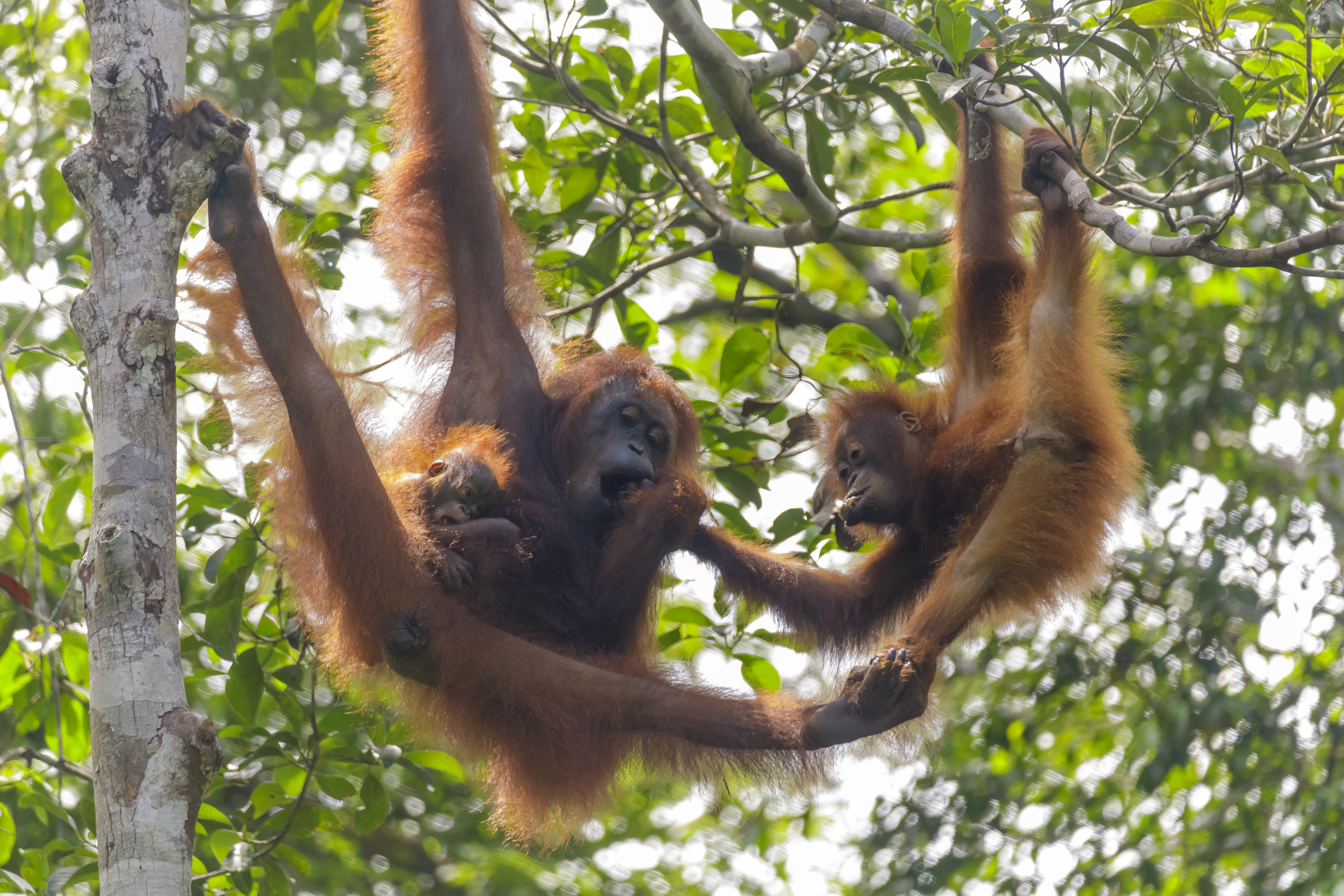
The critically endangered Bornean orangutan, a great ape endemic to Borneo, in Tanjung Puting

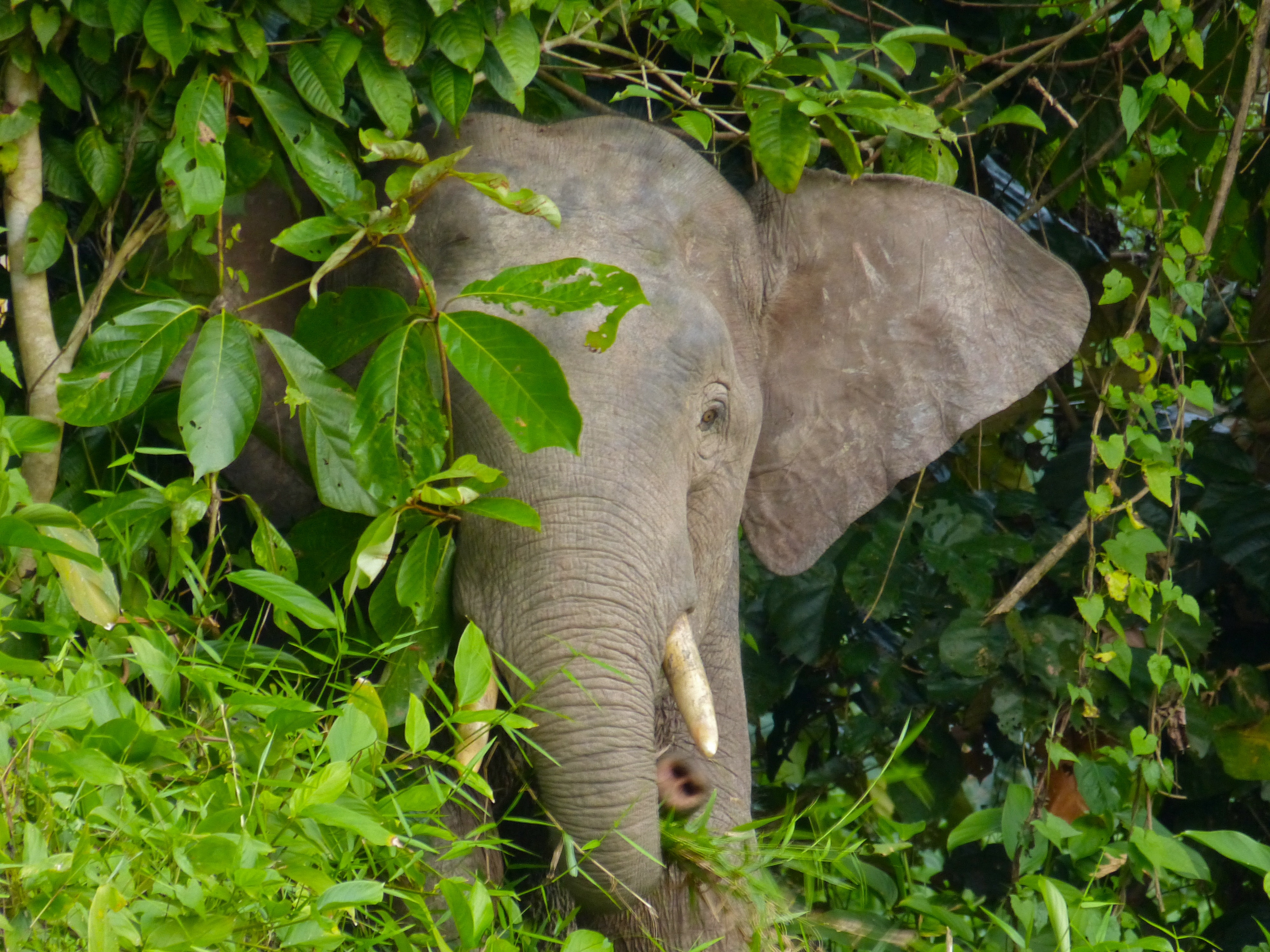
A Borneo elephant, a subspecies of Asian elephant that inhabits northeastern Borneo, seen along the Kinabatangan River

The wildlife of this ecoregion consists of a large number of forest animals ranging from the world's smallest squirrel, the least pygmy squirrel, to the largest land mammal in Asia, the Asian elephant. It includes the critically endangered Sumatran rhinoceros, the endangered and iconic Bornean orangutan, twelve other species of primate, Bornean bearded pigs and Bornean yellow muntjac deer. The primates of Borneo are: three apes (Bornean orangutan, Müller's Bornean gibbon and Bornean white-bearded gibbon), five langurs, the southern pig-tailed macaque, long-tailed macaque, Horsfield's tarsier (Tarsius bancanus), Bornean slow loris (Nycticebus borneanus), Kayan slow loris (Nycticebus kayan), Philippine slow loris (Nycticebus menagensis), Bangka slow loris (Nycticebus bancanus), and the endangered proboscis monkey (Nasalis larvatus). There are no tigers on Borneo; carnivores include the endangered Bornean clouded leopard (Neofelis diardi borneensis), the sun bear (Helarctos malayanus), the otter civet (Cynogale bennettii), and several other mustelids and viverrids.

The 380 species of birds include eight hornbills, eighteen woodpeckers and thirteen pittas. There are nine near-endemic and two endemic birds; the black-browed babbler (Malacocincla perspicillata) and the white-crowned shama (Copsychus stricklandii). Among the rich variety of reptiles and amphibians are crocodiles and the earless monitor lizard (Lanthanotus borneensis). The sounds of the forest vary from day to night as different combinations of these birds and animals emerge to roam and feed.

== Biogeography ==
During the Pleistocene glacial epoch, all of Borneo, Java, Sumatra, and mainland Indochina were part of the same landmass, called Sundaland. This allowed plants and animals to migrate from one region to the next. Now Borneo is separated from the Malay Peninsula and the islands, but it still shares a lot of the same plant and animal diversity, while Sulawesi has less Borneo wildlife.

== Threats and preservation ==
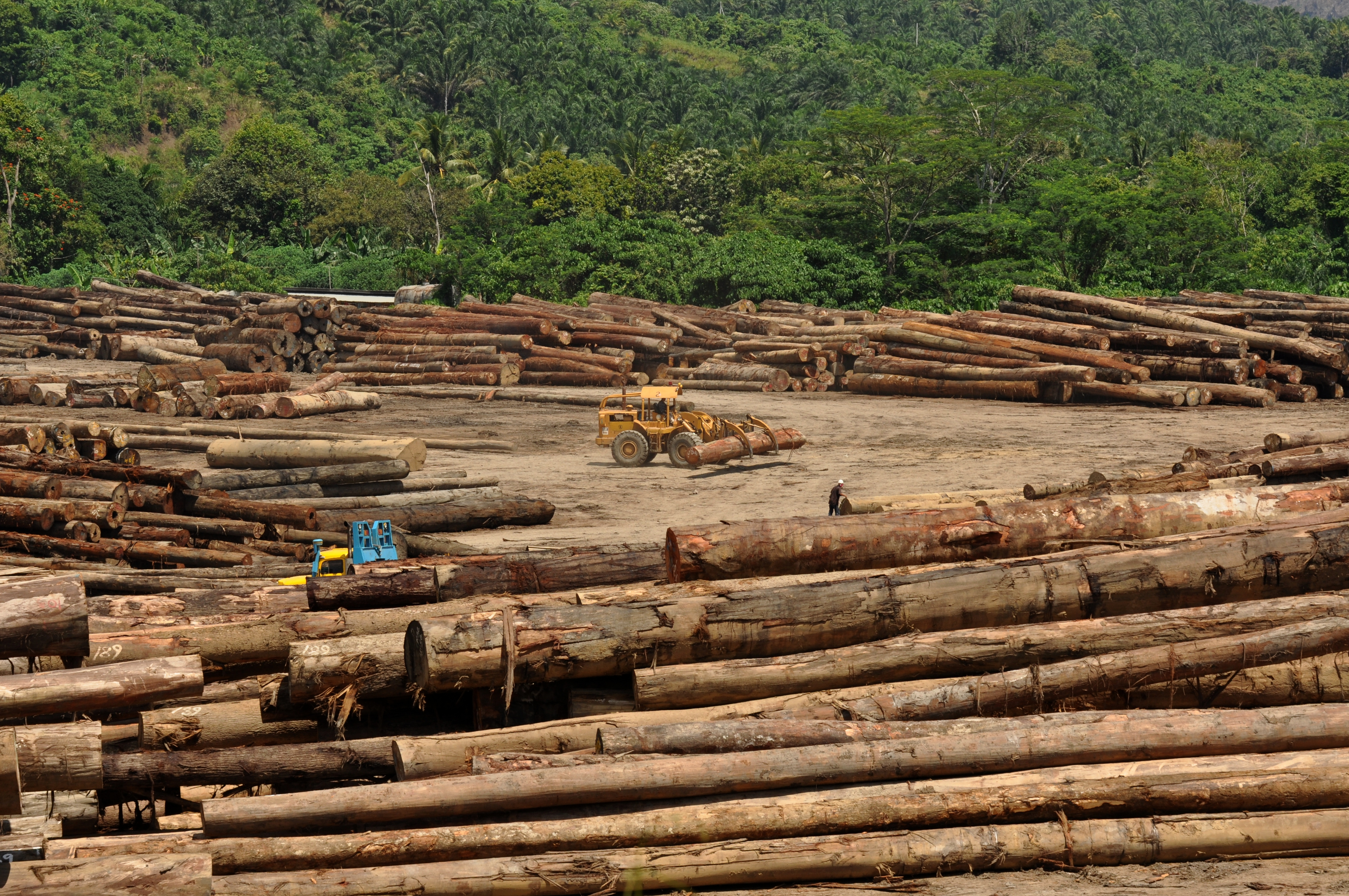
Logging in Sabah, Malaysian Borneo

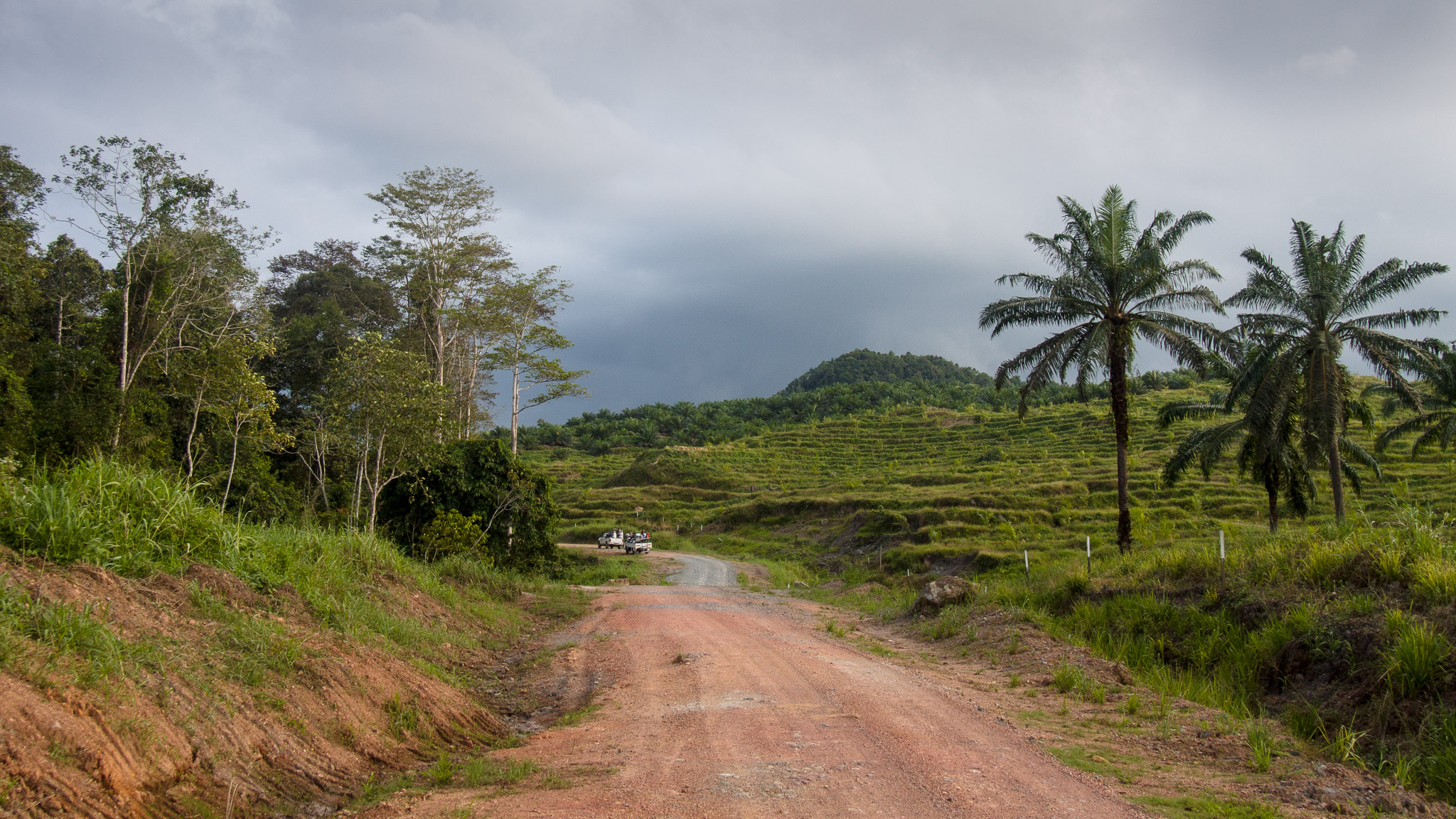
New palm plantation (right), Tabin Wildlife Reserve

Logging and conversion of natural forests to rubber, oil palm and industrial timber plantations and for small-scale farming have given rise to significant deforestation in recent decades. Borneo has lost more than half of its rainforests in the past half a century. In 1982–83 and again in 1997–98, forest fires in Kalimantan cleared around 25,000 km^{2} (9,700 sq mi) each time for oil palm planting. Further threats in Sabah come from exploration for oil and coal in the Maliau Basin and the draining of the wetlands on the Klias Peninsula. In 2001, the World Wildlife Foundation forecast that "If the current trend of habitat destruction continues, there will be no remaining lowland forests in Borneo by 2010." Although this forecast has not been fulfilled, in 2008 the IUCN Red List reported a 2005 prediction that "forest cover on the island of Borneo, if current deforestation rates continue, is projected to decline from 50% to less than one-third by 2020".

=== Protected areas ===
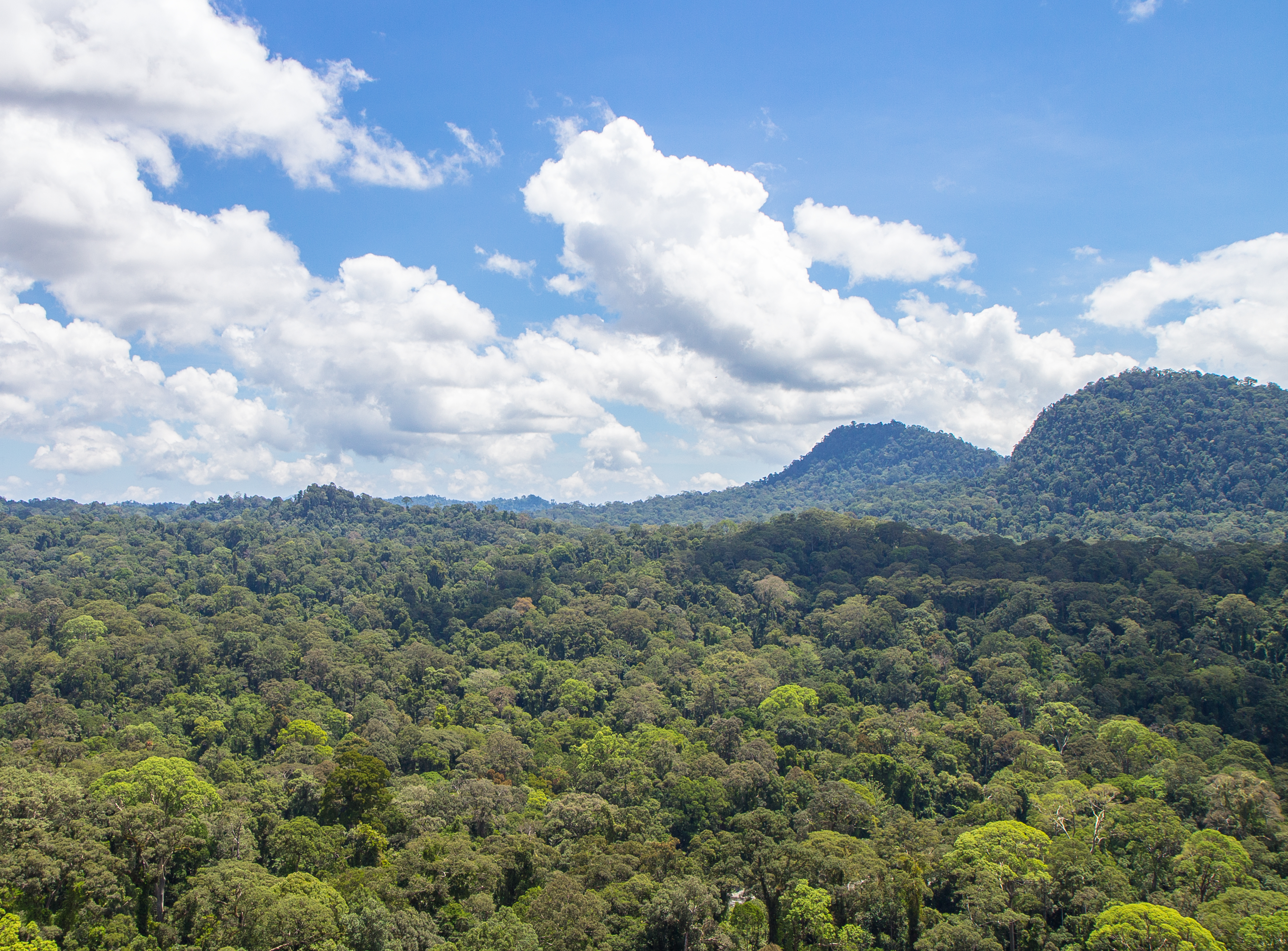
Danum Valley Conservation Area in Sabah

6.267% of the ecoregion is in protected areas. These include:

- In Brunei: Ulu Temburong National Park.
- In Kalimantan: Betung Kerihun National Park, Bukit Baka Bukit Raya National Park, Danau Sentarum National Park, Gunung Palung National Park, Kayan Mentarang National Park, Kutai National Park, Meratus National Park, Sebangau National Park, and Tanjung Puting National Park.
- In Sabah: Balembangan Forest Reserve, Bidu Bidu Forest Reserve, Binsuluk Forest Reserve, Botitian Forest Reserve, Bukit Kuamas Forest Reserve, Bukit Taviu Forest Reserve, Crocker Range National Park, Danum Valley Conservation Area, Deramakot Forest Reserve, Gomantong Forest Reserve, Kinabalu Park, Klias Forest Reserve, Lipaso Forest Reserve, Maliau Basin Conservation Area, Mandamai Forest Reserve, Mount Pock Forest Reserve, Silabukan Protection Forest Reserve, Tabin Wildlife Reserve, Tangkulap Forest Reserve, Tawai Forest Reserve, Tawau Hills National Park, Ulu Kalumpang Forest Reserve, and Ulu Telupid Forest Reserve.
- In Sarawak: Batang Ai National Park, Batu Laga National Park, Bukit Hitam Nature Reserve, Bukit Kana National Park, Bukit Lima Nature Reserve, Bukit Mersing National Park, Bukit Sembiling Nature Reserve, Bakun Islands National Park, Bukit Tiban National Park, Bungo Range National Park, Dered Krian National Park, Fairy Cave Nature Reserve, Gunung Buda National Park, Gunung Gading National Park, Gunung Mulu National Park, Gunung Pueh National Park, Kuching Wetlands National Park, Kubah National Park, Lambir Hills National Park, Limbang Mangrove National Park, Loagan Bunut National Park, Niah National Park, Pelagus National Park, Sampadi National Park, Semenggoh Nature Reserve, Similajau National Park, Sungai Meluang National Park, Tanjung Datu National Park, Usun Apau National Park, and Wind Cave Nature Reserve.
