= List of national parks of Malaysia =

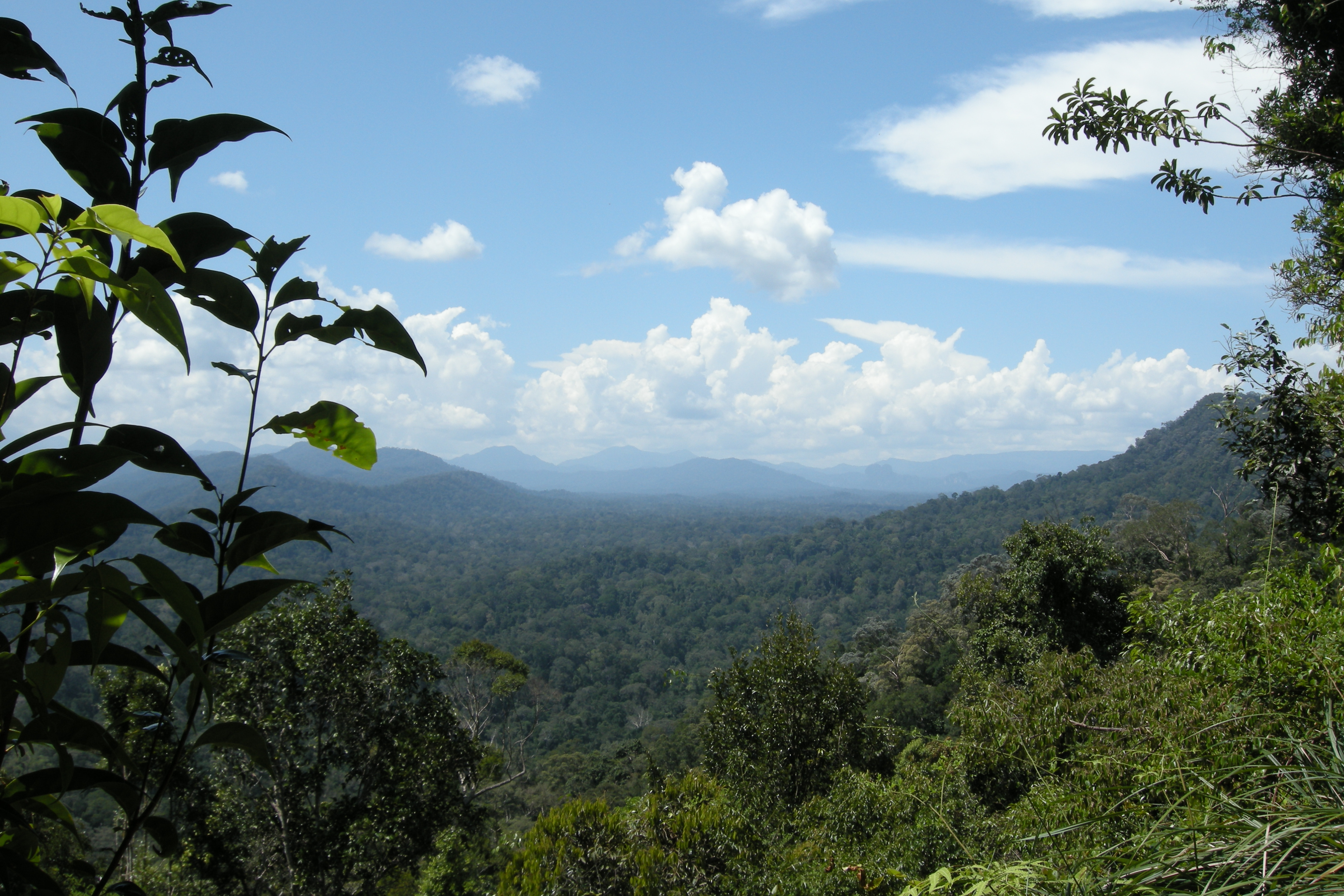
Taman Negara

Malaysia has a number of national parks, but most of them are de facto state parks. This page provides the list of protected areas and pictures associated with the facilities and activities available in each area.

== Peninsular Malaysia ==
All national parks and reserves in Peninsular Malaysia are under the jurisdiction of the Department of Wildlife and National Parks of Malaysia. For states that have state parks, the state governments might establish managing agencies for the parks.

=== National parks ===
- Taman Negara, established 1939
- Endau-Rompin National Park, gazetted 1993
- Penang National Park, declared 2003
- Gunung Ledang National Park, gazetted 2005
- Taman Negara Johor Tanjung Piai
- Taman Negara Johor Pulau Kukup

=== State parks and reserves ===
Johor

- Hutan Lipur Sungai Bantang
- Hutan Lipur Gunung Arong
- Hutan Lipur Gunung Berlumut

Kelantan

- Mount Setong State Park

Pahang

- Taman Negeri Rompin
- Tengku Hassanal Wildlife Reserve

Perak

- Royal Belum State Park
- Sungkai Sambar Deer and Pheasant Wildlife Reserve

Perlis

- Perlis State Park
- Wang Pinang Reserve

Selangor

- Selangor State Park
- Sungai Dusun Wildlife Reserve
- Templer's Park
- Kuala Selangor Nature Park

Melaka

- Melaka State Park, Bukit Sedanan

Terengganu

- Setiu Wetlands State Park
- Kenyir State Park
- Tenggol Island State Park

== East Malaysia ==
The national parks of Sarawak and Sabah

=== Sarawak ===
National Parks and other conservation areas in Sarawak are under the governance of the Sarawak Forestry Corporation.

- Bako National Park
- Batang Ai National Park
- Bruit National Park
- Bukit Tiban National Park
- Gunung Buda National Park
- Gunung Gading National Park
- Gunung Mulu National Park
- Kubah National Park
- Kuching Wetlands National Park
- Lambir Hills National Park
- Limbang Mangrove National Park
- Loagan Bunut National Park
- Maludam National Park
- Miri-Sibuti Coral Reef National Park
- Niah National Park
- Pelagus National Park
- Pulong Tau National Park
- Rajang Mangroves National Park
- Samunsam Wildlife Sanctuary
- Santubong National Park
- Sedilu National Park
- Similajau National Park
- Sungai Meluang National Park
- Talang Satang National Park
- Tanjung Datu National Park
- Turtle Islands National Park
- Ulu Sebuyau National Park
- Usun Apau National Park
- Wind Cave Nature Reserve

=== Sabah ===
National or state parks in Sabah are managed by Sabah Parks. Other reserves or protected areas are under the governance of the Sabah Forestry Department and Sabah Foundation.

- Crocker Range Park
- Kinabalu Park
- Pulau Tiga Park
- Tawau Hills Park
- Tun Sakaran Marine Park
- Tunku Abdul Rahman Park
- Turtle Islands Park
- Sipadan Island Park
- Tun Mustapha Marine Park
- Kota Kinabalu Wetland Centre
- Lok Kawi Wildlife Park
- Padang Teratak Wetlands Area
- Lower Kinabatangan - Segama Wetlands
- Lower Kinabatangan Wildlife Sanctuary
- Tabin Wildlife Reserve
- Sepilok Orangutan Rehabilitation Centre

Protected Forest Reserves:

- Balembangan Forest Reserve
- Bengkoka Forest Reserve
- Bidu Bidu Forest Reserve
- Binsuluk Forest Reserve
- Botitian Forest Reserve
- Bukit Kuamas Forest Reserve
- Bukit Taviu Forest Reserve
- Danum Valley Conservation Area
- Deramakot Forest Reserve
- Gomantong Forest Reserve
- Gunung Rara Forest Reserve
- Klias Forest Reserve
- Lipaso Forest Reserve
- Maliau Basin Conservation Area
- Mandamai Forest Reserve
- Mount Pock Forest Reserve
- Silabukan Protection Forest Reserve
- Tawai Forest Reserve
- Tenompok Forest Reserve
- Ulu Kalumpang Forest Reserve
- Ulu Telupid Forest Reserve

== See also ==
- Conservation in Malaysia
- Department of Wildlife and National Parks
- Protected areas of Johor
- Malaysian Wildlife Law
- Deforestation in Malaysia
