= Shorea micans =

Conservation status
- Least Concern (IUCN 3.1)

Scientific classification
- Kingdom: Plantae
- Clade: Tracheophytes
- Clade: Angiosperms
- Clade: Eudicots
- Clade: Rosids
- Order: Malvales
- Family: Dipterocarpaceae
- Genus: Shorea
- Species: S. micans

Binomial name
- Shorea micans P.S.Ashton

Species of tree

Shorea micans is a species of plant in the family Dipterocarpaceae. The species name is derived from Latin (micans = gleaming) and refers to this species shiny leaves.

Shorea micans is endemic to the island of Borneo, found only within the Malaysia Sabah section of the island. It has been found in numerous protected areas, including Bidu Bidu, Tawai, Meliau Range, Kuamas and Bukit Tingkar forest reserves.

It is a low emergent to main canopy tree in mixed dipterocarp forest, on soils overlying ultrabasic rock, up to 560 metres elevation.
