= Sunda Shelf mangroves =

Mangrove ecoregion in Southeast Asia

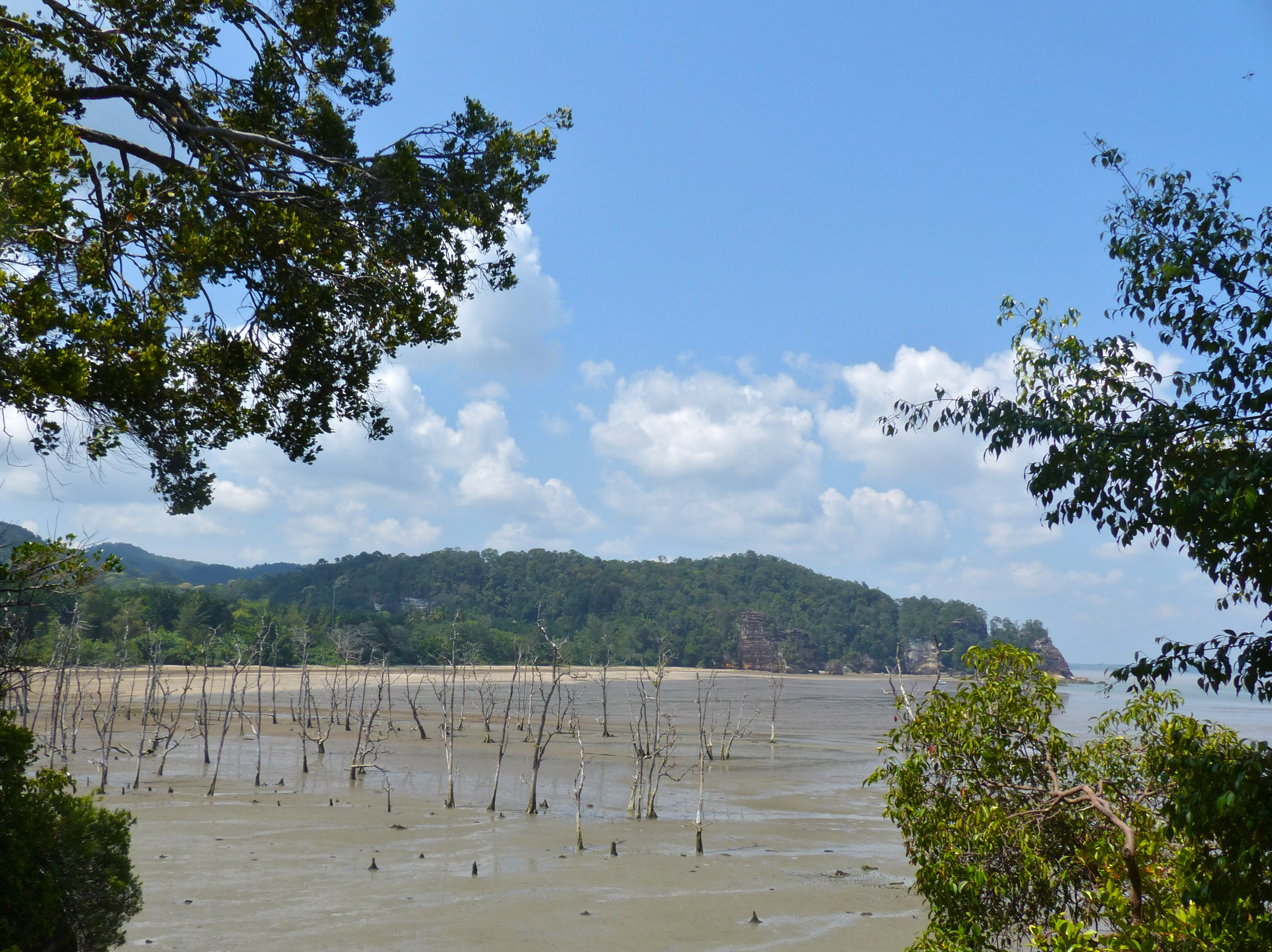
- Bako National Park, Sarawak, Malaysia

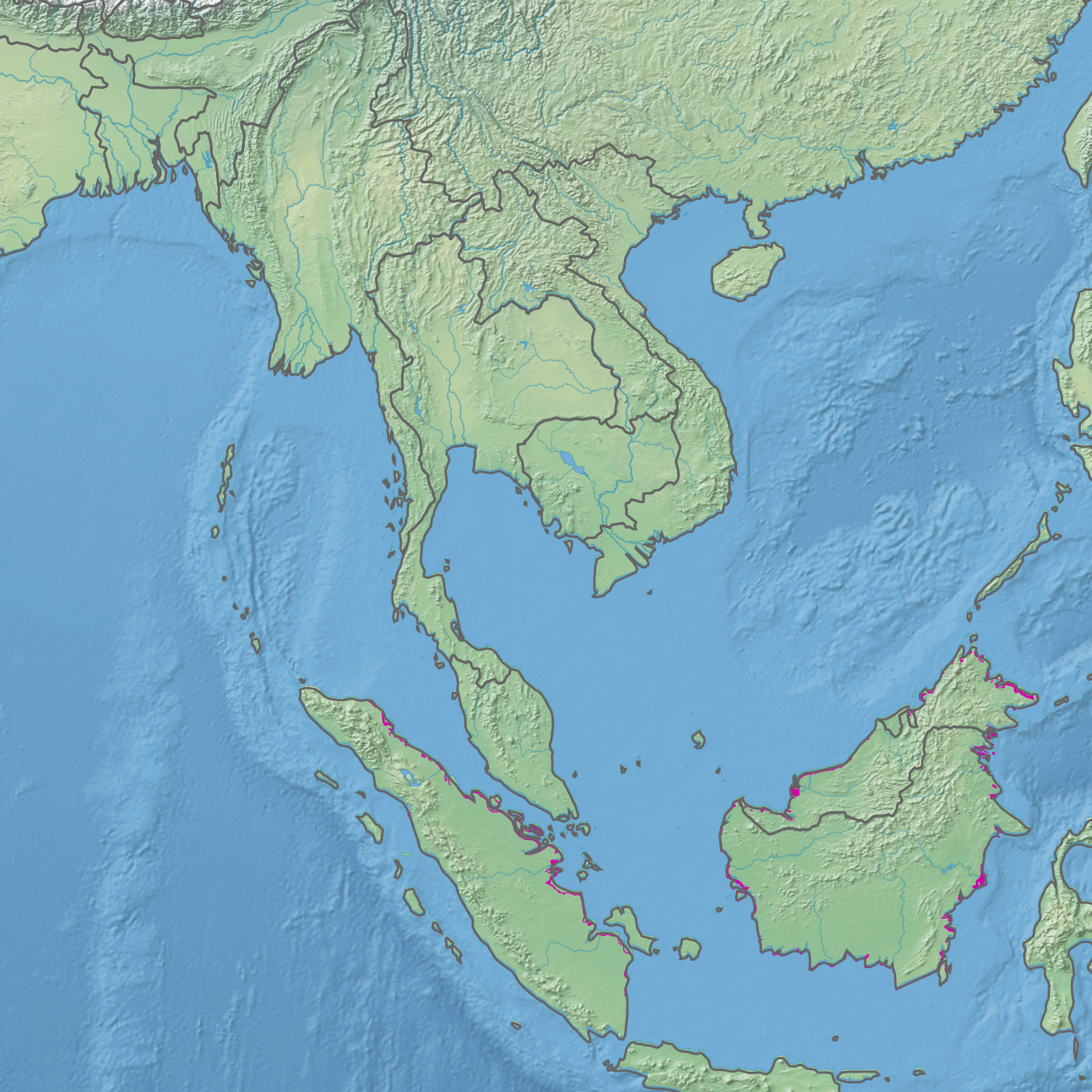
- Ecoregion territory (in purple, sections along the coasts for four countries)

Ecology
- Realm: Indomalayan
- Biome: Mangroves

Geography
- Area: 37,529 km^{2} (14,490 sq mi)
- Countries: Malaysia; Indonesia

Conservation
- Protected: 13.16%

The Sunda Shelf mangroves ecoregion, in the mangrove biome, are on the coasts of the islands of Borneo and eastern Sumatra in Malaysia and Indonesia. They are home to the proboscis monkey.

As well as being an important habitat for terrestrial and marine wildlife, mangroves preserve the shape of the coastline.

== Flora ==
There are more plant species here than in most mangrove forests in the world, with five different types of mangrove dominating parts of the region as follows: Avicennia and Sonneratia species on the coast where water is saltiest and the tidal wash strongest; Rhizophoras and Bruguieras in the swampy areas just behind them; and Nypa fruticans palms in the freshwater streams further inland still.

About 28 species of mangroves trees grow in the ecoregion, including Aegiceras corniculatum, Avicennia alba, Avicennia lanata, Avicennia marina, Avicennia officinalis, Bruguiera cylindrica, Bruguiera gymnorhiza, Bruguiera parviflora, Bruguiera sexangula, Ceriops decandra, Ceriops tagal, Excoecaria agallocha, Heritiera littoralis, Kandelia candel, Lumnitzera littorea, Lumnitzera racemosa, Nypa fruticans, Phoenix paludosa, Rhizophora apiculata, Rhizophora lamarckii, Rhizophora mucronata, Rhizophora stylosa, Scyphiphora hydrophyllacea, Sonneratia alba, Sonneratia caseolaris, Sonneratia ovata, Xylocarpus granatum, and Xylocarpus moluccensis.

== Fauna ==
Mammals of the mangroves include the proboscis monkey (Nasalis larvatus), which is endemic to the Bornean mangroves and adjacent lowlands, and is absent from Sumatra.

The mangroves are home to many birds, including the white-bellied sea eagle (Haliaeetus leucogaster) and brahminy kite (Haliastur indus), and species of herons, cormorants, plovers, sandpipers, kingfishers, terns, sunbirds, munias, and tailor birds.

== Threats and preservation ==
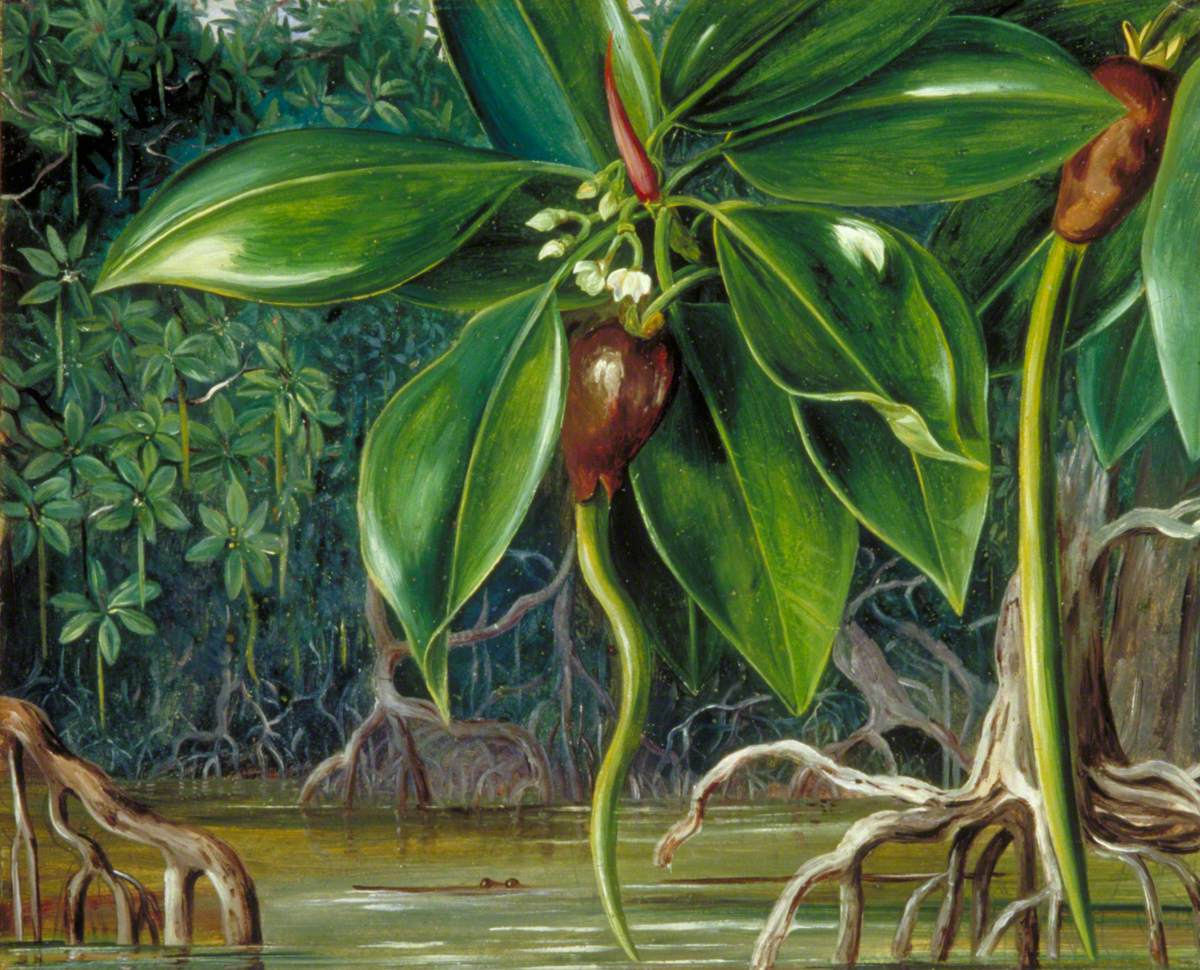
A Mangrove Swamp in Sarawak, Borneo (1876) by Marianne North

Mangroves are vulnerable ecosystems as trees are cut for timber, firewood and to clear land for agriculture and urban development such as shrimp farming. This loss of habitat persists despite the mangroves being part of a large number of protected areas including: on Borneo Bako National Park in Malaysia and Tanjung Puting and Gunung Palung National Parks in Indonesia, and on Sumatra Berbak and Sembilang National Parks.

Protected areas include:

- Bako National Park
- Batumapun Forest Reserve
- Berbak National Park
- Binsuluk Forest Reserve
- Bukau Api-Api Forest Reserve
- Bukit Soeharto Grand Forest Park
- Gunung Palung National Park
- Gunung Pueh National Park
- Kabili Sepilok Forest Reserve
- Klias Forest Reserve
- Kota Kinabalu Wetlands Nature Reserve
- Kuala Lupak Wildlife Reserve
- Kuching Wetlands National Park
- Kulamba Forest Reserve
- Kutai National Park
- Lower Kinabatangan-Segama Wetlands
- Malawaring Forest Reserve
- Maludam National Park
- Menumbok Forest Reserve
- Miri-Sibuti Coral Reef National Park
- Muara Kaman Sedulang Nature Reserve
- Nunukan Nature Reserve
- Pulau Siarau Nature Reserve
- Rajang Mangrove National Park
- Samunsam Widlife Reserve
- Santubong National Park
- Sebangau National Park
- Sembilang National Park
- Sepilok (Mangrove) Forest Reserve
- Sibuti Wildlife Reserve
- Similajau National Park
- Sungai Bulan dan Sungai Lulan Nature Reserve
- Sungai Gologob Forest Reserve
- Sungai Kapur Forest Reserve
- Sungai Lasun & Pulau Evans Forest Reserve
- Sungai Maruap Forest Reserve
- Sungai Segama Forest Reserve
- Sungai Serudong Forest Reserve
- Tabin Wildlife Reserve
- Tanjung Datu National Park
- Tanjung Puting National Park
- Tawau Forest Reserve
- Teak Plantation Forest Reserve
- Teluk Adang Nature Reserve
- Teluk Apar Nature Reserve
- Teluk Kelumpang, Selat Laut dan Selat Sebuku Nature Reserve
- Teluk Pamukan Nature Reserve
- Trusan Kinabatangan Forest Reserve
- Tun Mustapha Park
- Ulu Sebuyau National Park
- Umas Umas Forest Reserve
- Weston Forest Reserve
