= Botitian Forest Reserve =

Forest reserve in Borneo

- IUCN category Ia (strict nature reserve)
- Location within Borneo
- Location: Sabah, Malaysia
- Nearest city: Beluran, Beluran District
- Coordinates: 6°02′17″N 117°18′43″E
- Area: 21.45 km^{2} (8.28 sq mi)
- Established: 1992
- Governing body: Sabah Forestry Department

Botitian Forest Reserve is a protected forest reserve in Beluran District of Sandakan Division, Sabah, Malaysia. It was designated as a Class 1 Protection Forest by the Sabah Forestry Department in 1992. Its area is 2,145 hectares (21.45 km^{2}). Botitian's terrain is mountainous in the reserve's centre, to low hills and flat land in the western and eastern sections. The forest is mainly secondary with pioneer species. Canopy trees are mainly dipterocarp.

== Flora ==
Botitian Forest Reserve hosts pioneer tree species such as Macaranga, Mallotus and Cleistanthus. Dipterocarp tree species include Dipterocarpus acutangulus, Dipterocarpus caudiferus, Dipterocarpus kerrii, Dipterocarpus stellatus, Hopea beccariana, Hopea pentanervia and numerous Shorea species.

== Fauna ==
Botitian Forest Reserve is home to monkeys and wild boar. The bufferfly species Lexias canescens and Lexias pardalis have been observed in the reserve.
