= Southwest Borneo freshwater swamp forests =

Ecoregion in Borneo

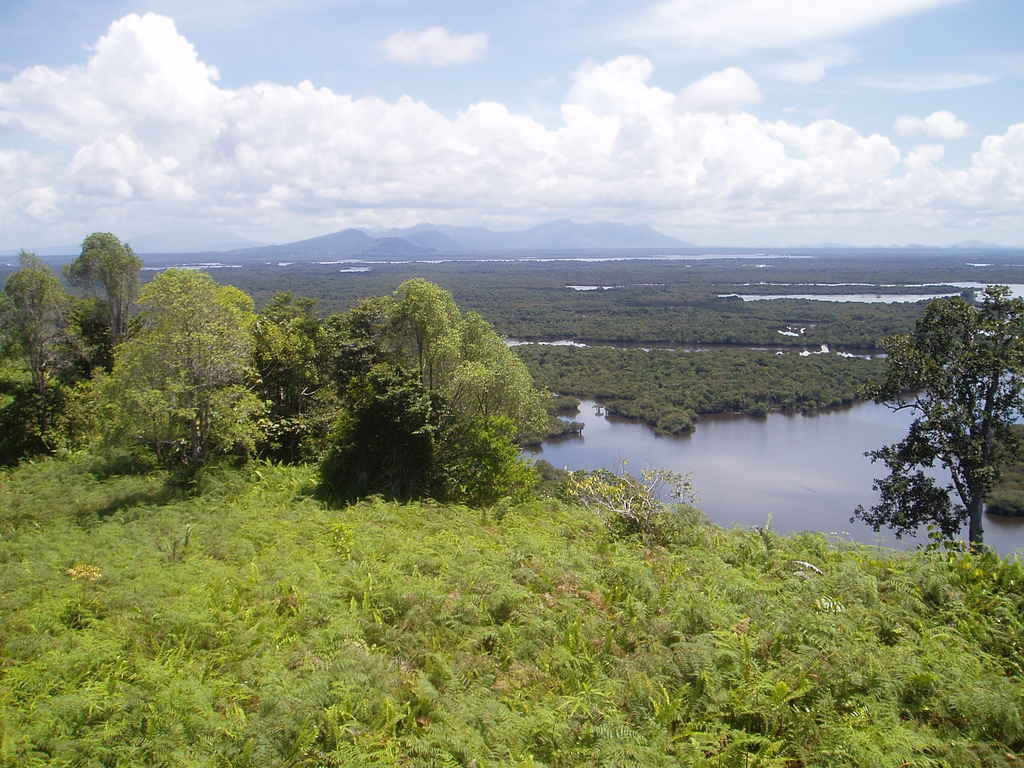
- Lake Sentarum National Park

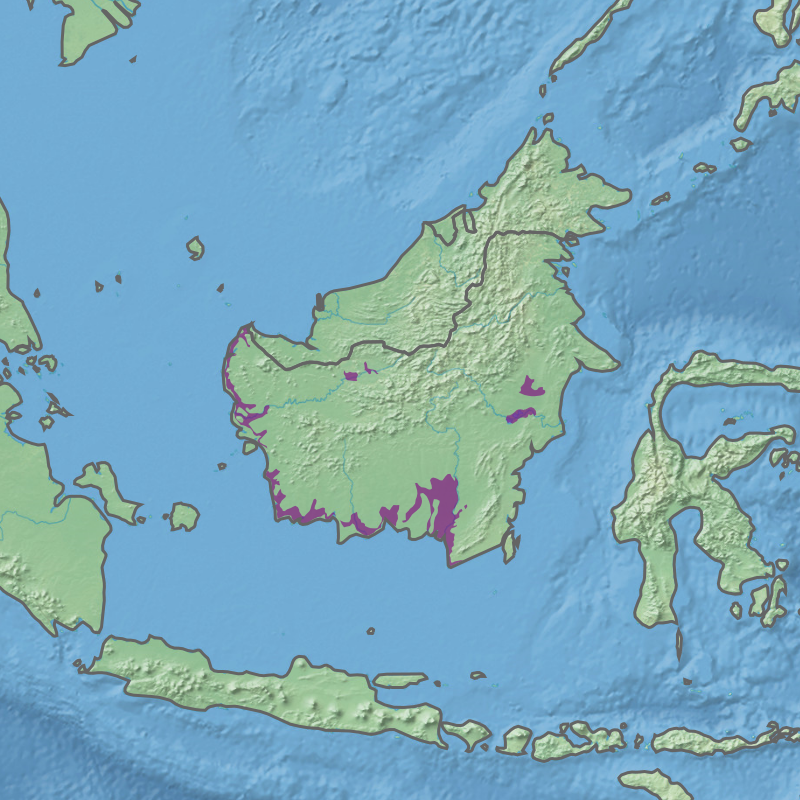
- Ecoregion territory (in purple)

Ecology
- Realm: Indomalayan
- Biome: Tropical and subtropical moist broadleaf forests

Geography
- Area: 36,849 km^{2} (14,227 sq mi)
- Country: Indonesia, Malaysia
- Coordinates: 1.25°N 111.25°E

The Southwest Borneo freshwater swamp forests ecoregion (WWF ID: IM0153) covers a number disconnected patches of freshwater swamp forest along the southwestern coasts of Borneo. The swamps are generally set back a few kilometers or two from the sea by the saltwater-affected Sunda Shelf mangroves The relatively fertile, flat soil has led to much of this ecoregion being converted to agriculture.

== Location and description ==
The freshwater swamp forests of the southwest coast of Borneo occur where rivers on flat alluvial plains meet the coastal mangroves. The resulting sediment and periodic inundation produce more nutrient-rich, less acidic soil, and taller trees than peat swamps

== Climate ==
The climate of the ecoregion is Tropical rainforest climate (Köppen climate classification (Af)). This climate is characterized as hot, humid, and having at least 60 mm of precipitation every month.

== Flora and fauna ==
The makeup of these forests varies according to patterns of inundation, soil nutrient levels and acidity. There are grassy wetlands, marshes, areas of scrub, and areas of Pandanus and palm trees. The mature forest supports a wide variety of tree and shrub species, including the families and genera of Adina a shrub, Alstonia (some species of which are of commercial value for timber), Campnosperma, Coccoceras, Dillenia, Dyera, Erythrina, Eugenia, Ficus, Gluta, Lophopetalum, Memecylon, Pentaspadon, Shorea, and Vatica.

Diversity of faunal species is higher than in the peat swamp. The most common primate in the freshwater swamp is the vulnerable Crab-eating macaque (Macaca fascicularis). The freshwater swamp is also home to the critically endangered Bornean orangutan (Pongo pygmaeus). Over 360 species of birds have been recorded in this ecoregion.

== Protected areas ==
Over 14% of the ecoregion is officially protected. These protected areas include:

- Kutai National Park
- Tanjung Puting
- Lake Sentarum National Park
