= Taman Negeri Rompin, Pahang =

Taman Negeri Rompin or Rompin State Park is a state park located within Rompin District, in the state of Pahang, Malaysia. It spans an area of 31,797 hectares, consisting of lowland mixed dipterocarp forest, edaphic hill forest formation and rivers. The geological history of the park dates back at least 248 million years to the Permian-Carboniferous age, which the rock types include low grade metamorphics, igneous, granite and sedimentary sequence that has shaped the ecosystem within the protected area.

The forest of Taman Negeri Rompin includes species of plants such as Livistona endauensis, a type of fan palm endemic to the forest reserve of Endau-Rompin. Due to the diversity of plant species within this reserved forest, hundreds of species of birds, mammals, fish, reptiles, amphibians and insects have been documented, several of which are threatened or endangered.

== Flora and fauna ==
Endau-Rompin is among the Central Forest Spine (CFS) of Peninsular Malaysia. The wildlife recorded includes the Malayan tiger (Panthera tigris jacksonii), though the number of the individual is unknown. It was also recorded that a tiger has preyed upon the cub of sunbear (Helarctos malayanus), by a camera trap. In total, six species of cats have been recorded within the state park. Other animals include the arboreal mammals, the white-handed gibbon (Hylobates lar), and Malayan tapir (Tapirus indicus). Bearded pigs (Sus barbatus) are also recorded, which at Peninsular Malaysia the species occur only at Johor and the southern of Pahang.

The lowland and hill dipterocarp forest flora support diverse species of birds that includes both diurnal and nocturnal such as babblers, hornbills, flycatchers, owls, broadbills and a variety of migratory birds. The list of birds provided is based on the sighting recorded within the park

=== Piciformes ===
- Checker-throated Woodpecker (Chrysophlegma mentalis)
- Buff-rumped Woodpecker (Meiglyptes tristis)
- Buff-necked Woodpecker (Meiglyptes tukki)
- Crimson-winged Woodpecker (Picus puniceus)
- White-bellied Woodpecker (Dryocopus javanensis)
- Banded Woodpecker (Chrysophlegma miniaceum)
- Grey-and-buff Woodpecker (Hemicircus sordidus)
- Maroon Woodpecker (Blythipicus rubiginosus)

=== Cuculiformes ===
- Raffle's Malkoha (Rhinortha chlorophaeus)
- Red-billed Malkoha (Zanclostomus javanicus)
- Black-bellied Malkoha (Rhopodytes diardi)
- Malaysian Hawk-cuckoo (Hierococcyx fugax)
- Drongo Cuckoo (Surniculus lugubris)

=== Apodiformes ===
- Whiskered Treeswift (Hemiprocne comata)

=== Passeriformes ===
- Grey-bellied Bulbul (pycnonotus cyaniventris)
- Buff-vented Bulbul (Iole olivacea)
- Cream-vented Bulbul (Pycnonotus simplex)
- Yellow-bellied Bulbul (Alophoixus phaeocephalus)
- Hairy-backed Bulbul (Tricholestes criniger)
- Finsch's Bulbul (Iole finschii)
- Grey-cheeked Bulbul (Alophoixus tephrogenys)
- Straw-headed Bulbul (Pycnonotus zeylanicus)
- Asian Fairy Bluebird (Irena puella)
- Grey-headed Canary-flycatcher (Culicicapa ceylonensis)
- White-rumped Shama (Copsychus malabaricus)
- Oriental Magpie Robin (Copsychus saularis)
- Green Broadbill (Calyptomena viridis)
- Black-and-red Broadbill (Cymbirhynchus macrorhynchos)
- Black-and-yellow Broadbill (Eurylaimus ochromalus)
- Banded Broadbill (Eurylaimus javanicus)
- White-bellied Munia (Lonchura leucogastra)
- Amur Paradise Flycatcher (Terpsiphone incei)
- Pale Blue Flycatcher (Cyornis unicolor)
- Rufous-chested Flycatcher (Ficedula dumetoria)
- Green Iora (Aegithina viridissima)
- Great Iora (Aegithina lafresnayei)
- Lesser Cuckooshrike (Coracina fimbriata)
- Black-winged Flycatcher-shrike (Hemipus hirundinaceus)
- Rufous-tailed Tailorbird (Orthotomus sericeus)
- Common Tailorbird (Orthotomus sutorius)
- Dark-necked Tailorbird (Orthotomus atrogularis)
- Greater Green Leafbird (Chloropsis sonnerati)
- Blue-winged Leafbird (Chloropsis cochinchinensis)
- Grey-breasted Spiderhunter (Arachnothera affinis)
- Purple-naped Spiderhunter (Hypogramma hypogrammicum)
- Little Spiderhunter (Arachnothera longirostra)
- Yellow-eared Spiderhunter (Arachnothera chrysogenys)
- Hill Myna (Gracula religiosa)
- Crested Myna (Acridotheres cristatellus)
- Chestnut-naped Forktail (Enicurus ruficapillus)
- White-crowned Forktail (Enicurus leschenault)
- Pin-striped Tit-babbler (Macronus gularis)
- Fluffy-backed Tit-babbler (Macronus ptilosus)
- Chestnut-backed Scimitar-babbler (Pomatorhinus montanus)
- Moustached Babbler (Malacopteron magnirostre)
- Chestnut-winged Babbler (Stachyris nigriceps)
- White-bellied Erpornis (Erpornis zantholeuca)
- Yellow-breasted Flowerpecker (Prionochilus maculatus)
- Crimson-breasted Flowerpecker (Prionochilus percussus)
- Orange-bellied Flowerpecker (Dicaeum trigonostigma)
- Scarlet-breasted Flowerpecker (Prionochilus thoracicus)
- Fiery Minivet (Pericrocotus igneus)
- Scarlet Minivet (Pericrocotus speciosus)
- Brown Fulvetta (Alcippe brunneicauda)
- Spotted Fantail (Rhipidura perlata)
- Rufous-winged Philentoma (Philentoma pyrhoptera)
- Sultan Tit (Melanochlora sultanea)
- Dark-throated Oriole (Oriolus xanthonotus)

=== Coraciiformes ===
- Oriental Dwarf Kingfisher (Ceyx eithaca)
- Stork-billed Kingfisher (Pelargopsis capensis)
- Red-bearded Bee-eater (Nyctyornis amictus)
- Banded Kingfisher (Lacedo pulchella)

=== Bucerotiformes ===
- Wrinkled Hornbill (Aceros corrugatus)
- Black Hornbill (Anthracoceros malayanus)
- Helmeted Hornbill (Rhinoplax vigil)

=== Accipitriformes ===
- Lesser Fish Eagle (Ichtyophaga humilis)
- Crested Serpent Eagle (Spilornis cheela)
- Rufous-bellied Eagle (Lophotriorchis kienerii)

=== Psittaciformes ===
- Blue-crowned Hanging-parrot (Loriculus galgulus)
- Blue-rumped Parrot (Psittinus cyanurus)

=== Trogoniformes ===
- Scarlet-rumped Trogon (Herpactes devaucelii)

=== Columbiformes ===
- Little Green Pigeon (Treron olax)
- Thicked-billed Green Pigeon (Treton curvirostra)
- Green Imperial Pigeon (Ducula aenea)
- Emerald Dove (Chalcophaps indica)

=== Strigiformes ===
- Barred Eagle-Owl (Bubo sumatranus)
- Buffy Fish-owl (Ketupa ketupu)
