= Gomantong Caves =

Caves in Malaysia

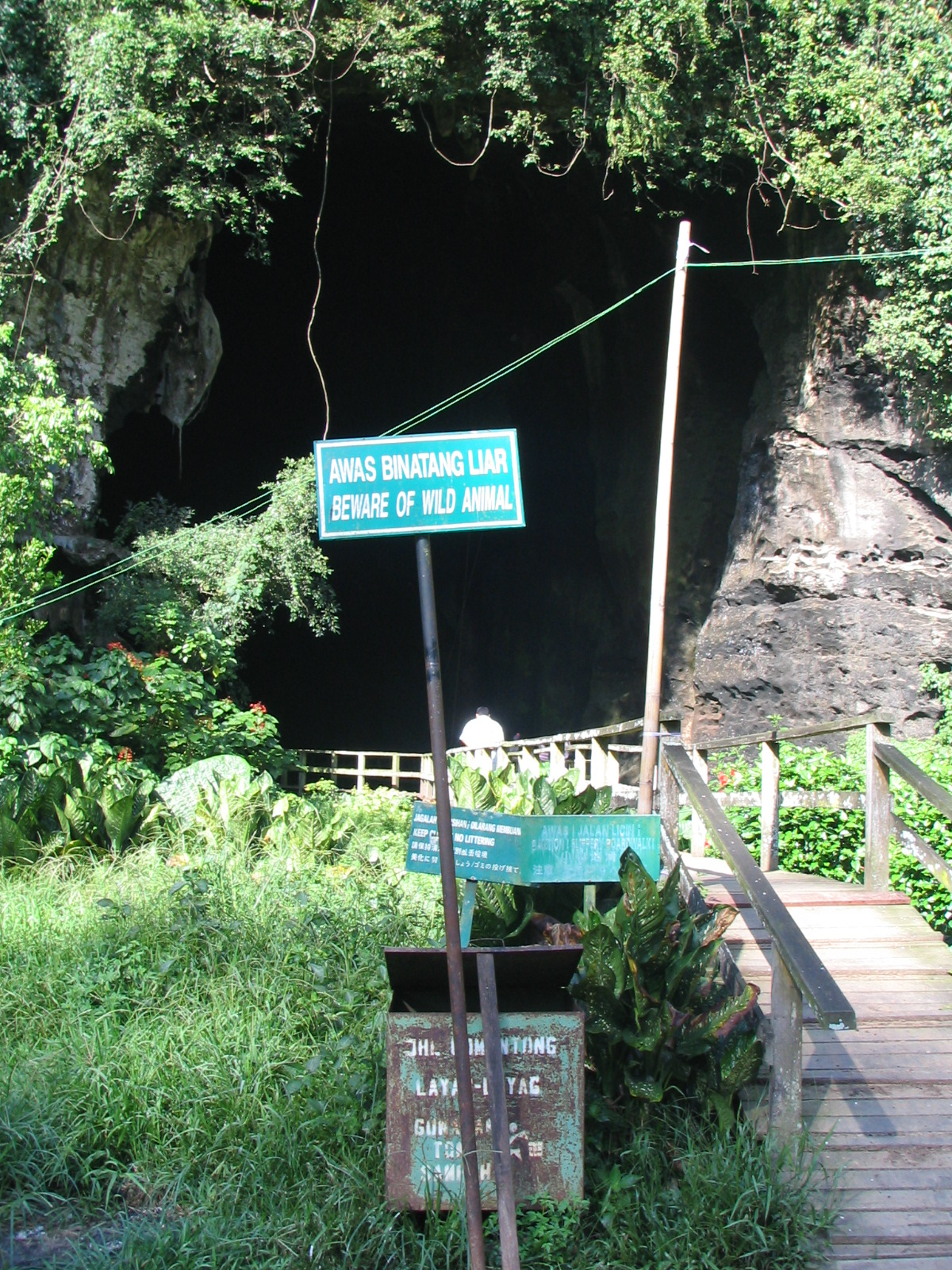
- Entrance to one of the caves.
- Interactive map of Gomantong Caves
- Coordinates: 5°31′0″N 118°4′0″E
- Discovery: 1930
- Entrances: 2

The Gomantong Caves are an intricate cave system inside Gomantong Hill in Sandakan Division, Sabah, Malaysia. The hill is the largest limestone outcrop in the Lower Kinabatangan area.

== Description ==
Situated in the Gomantong Forest Reserve, the caves and the surrounding area are a protected area for wildlife, especially orangutans. The limestone hill is also the only known site for the endangered land snail Plectostoma mirabile. Investigation of the guano deposits were first made in 1889 by J.H. Allard of the China Borneo Company, and the caves were first mapped by P. Orolfo in 1930. Detailed re-mapping and laser scanning of the caves was conducted in 2012 and July 2014.

The bat population is dominated by a colony of the wrinkle-lipped free-tailed bat (Chaerephon plicatus), whose nightly exodus is a popular tourist attraction. The population size, which has been widely exaggerated in the past, was counted at between 275,000 and 276,000 in 2012. There are also bat hawks that linger not far from the scene and prey specifically on the bats as they leave their roost.

== Bird nest harvesting ==
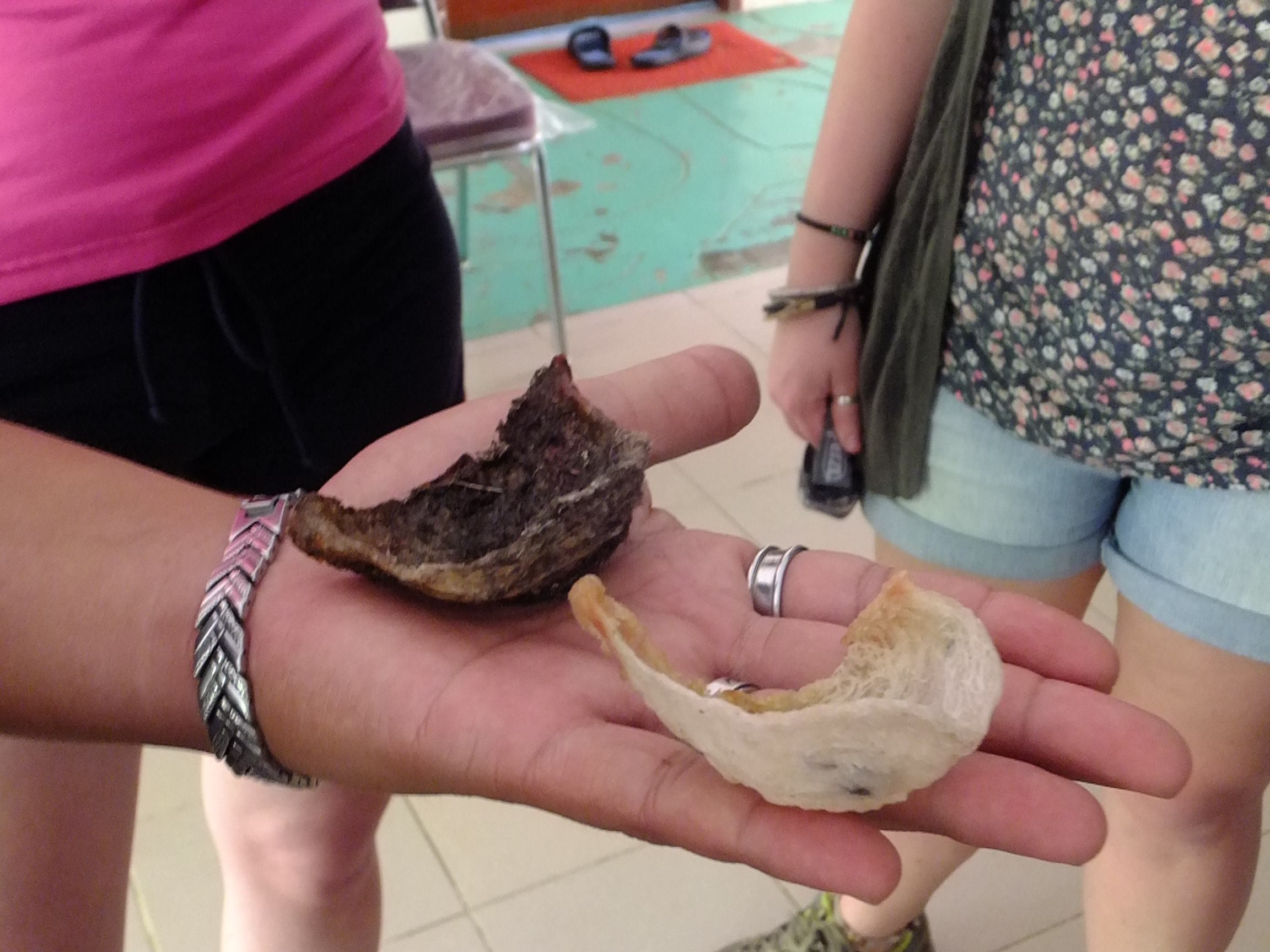
Bird nest from a black-nest swiftlet (Aerodramus maximus)

For centuries, the caves have been renowned for their valuable edible swiftlet nests, which are harvested for bird's nest soup. The most valuable of the nests, the white ones, can sell for very high prices. The birds' nest collection is an ancient tradition, and the trading of these nests has been done since at least AD 500. Twice a year, from February to April and July to September, locals with licenses climb to the roof of the caves, using only rattan ladders, ropes, and bamboo poles, and collect the nests. The first collection takes place early in the breeding season before the swiftlets lay their eggs. The birds then make another nest in which they finally lay their eggs. After the young have fledged, the second collection is made. Care must be taken to assure that the nests are collected only after the young swiftlets have abandoned these nests. These individuals are very much in demand by the people and communities that hold the government's harvesting licenses. Edible birds' nests are protected under the Wildlife Conservation Enactment of 1997. Heavy fines and penalties are imposed on unlicensed collectors.

== Caves accessibility ==
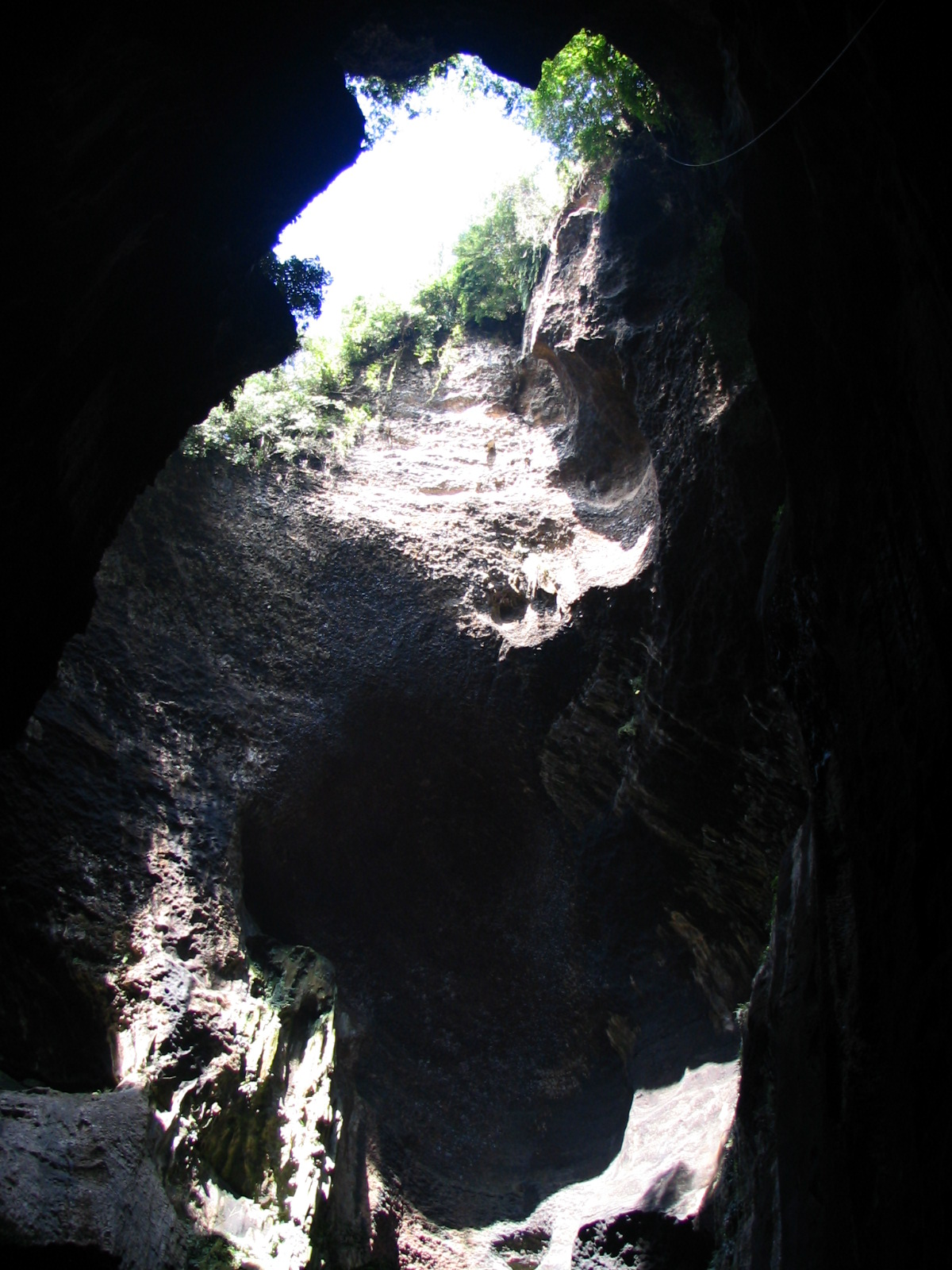
Inside the caves

The main cave system is divided into two parts: the more accessible Simud Hitam (Black Cave), and the larger Simud Putih (White Cave) which lies above. The names refer to the main type of nests produced by swiftlets in each cave. The cave system is home to many other animals, including massive populations of cockroaches, centipedes and bats. Outside one can see many raptors including crested serpent eagles, kingfishers, and Asian fairy-bluebirds. Access is in the form of a wooden walkway circuiting the interior.

=== Simud Hitam ===
Simud Hitam ("Black Cave") is the more accessible of the two caves, only a few minutes' walk from the entrance building, and it is open to the general public. Its ceiling can reach 40–60 m (130–200 ft) high. It is the source of the less-valuable "black saliva" nests. These contain both feathers and saliva and require cleaning afterwards.

=== Simud Putih ===
Simud Putih ("White Cave") is the larger of the two caves, and also the more technical; it is not open to the general public, and access requires appropriate caving equipment and experience. It is where the more valuable "white saliva" nests of the swiftlets are found, and is reached by a steep, 30-minute climb further up the mountains. The main entrance is located above and adjacent to the main "lighthole" at the back of Simud Hitam.
