= Semecarpus angustifolius =

Conservation status
- Vulnerable (IUCN 3.1)

Scientific classification
- Kingdom: Plantae
- Clade: Embryophytes
- Clade: Tracheophytes
- Clade: Angiosperms
- Clade: Eudicots
- Clade: Rosids
- Order: Sapindales
- Family: Anacardiaceae
- Genus: Semecarpus
- Species: S. angustifolius

Binomial name
- Semecarpus angustifolius Kochummen

Species of flowering plant

Semecarpus angustifolius is a flowering plant in the family Anacardiaceae. It is native to Borneo.

== Description ==
Semecarpus angustifolius grows as a small tree. The brown twigs are fissured. The leaves are oblong and measure up to 64 cm (25 in) long and to 4.4 cm (1.7 in) wide. The ellipsoid fruits measure up to 1 cm (0.4 in) long.

== Taxonomy ==
Semecarpus angustifolius was described by Malaysian botanist Kizhakkedathu Mathai Kochummen in Sandakania in 1996. The type specimen was collected in Tawai Forest Reserve in Sabah, Borneo. The specific epithet angustifolius means 'narrow-leaved'.

== Distribution and habitat ==
Semecarpus angustifolius is endemic to Borneo, where it is confined to Tawai Forest Reserve in Sabah. Its habitat is in lowland forests, at about 200 m (700 ft) elevation.

== Conservation ==
Semecarpus angustifolius has been assessed as vulnerable on the IUCN Red List. It is threatened by forest fires and by climate change. However, Tawai Forest Reserve is a protected area.
