= Leptobrachella palmata =

Conservation status
- Critically Endangered (IUCN 3.1)

Scientific classification
- Kingdom: Animalia
- Phylum: Chordata
- Class: Amphibia
- Order: Anura
- Family: Megophryidae
- Genus: Leptobrachella
- Species: L. palmata

Binomial name
- Leptobrachella palmata Inger and Stuebing, 1992

Species of frog

Leptobrachella palmata is a species of frog in the family Megophryidae. It is endemic to Borneo, and known only from its type locality in Lipaso Forest Reserve, Sabah, Malaysia. Common names palm Borneo frog and palm dwarf litter frog have been coined for it.

== Description ==
Based on the type series consisting of five adult males, Leptobrachella palmata measure 14.4–168 mm (0.57–6.61 in) in snout–vent length. The overall appearance is moderately slender. The snout is obtusely pointed in dorsal view and rounded in profile. The tympanum is distinct. The finger and toe tips are expanded into small, triangular discs. The toes fully (between toes 1–2) webbed or nearly so. Skin is smooth. except for rounded glands on the sides and a distinct, curved supratympanic fold. Colour in alcohol is medium brown without markings above and white below.

== Habitat and conservation ==
The type series was collected along a clear, rocky hill stream in lowland forest at elevations of 310 m (1,020 ft) above sea level.

Leptobrachella palmata appears to be a rare species. While the type locality is a forest reserve, its management is not adequate for the purpose of biodiversity conservation. More generally, lowland forests, like the one where the species was found, are being rapidly logged, leading to habitat loss. Also the resulting siltation of the larval habitat is a threat.
