= Bengkoka Forest Reserve =

Protected area in Sabah, Malaysia

- IUCN category Ia (strict nature reserve)
- Location within Borneo
- Location: Sabah, Malaysia
- Nearest city: Pitas, Pitas District
- Coordinates: 6°52′16″N 117°10′05″E
- Area: 62.7 km^{2} (24.2 sq mi)
- Established: 1984
- Governing body: Sabah Forestry Department

Bengkoka Forest Reserve is a protected forest reserve in Pitas District of Kudat Division, on the Bengkoka Peninsula in Sabah, Malaysia. It was designated as a Class 1 Protection Forest by the Sabah Forestry Department in 1984. Its area is 6,270 hectares (62.7 km^{2}). The reserve is low-lying. Threats to the reserve forests include fires and land conversion for agriculture.

== Flora and fauna ==
The most common tree species in Bengkoka Forest Reserve is Acacia mangium, the main species in the reserve's plantation forest. Other reserve species include Alstonia spatulata, Macaranga tanarius, Neolamarckia cadamba and Trema orientalis. The reserve is home to barking deer and wild boar.
