= Batu Manikar =

Coordinates: 5°22′06.5″N 115°13′22.4″E

- Interactive map of Batu Manikar
- Country: Malaysia
- Federal territory: Labuan

Batu Manikar is a small town in Federal Territory of Labuan, Malaysia. The oldest chimney and Labuan Bird Park are located here.
