= Lipaso Forest Reserve =

Protected area in Sabah, Malaysia

- IUCN category Ia (strict nature reserve)
- Location within Borneo
- Location: Sabah, Malaysia
- Nearest city: Telupid, Telupid District
- Coordinates: 5°41′49″N 117°01′37″E
- Area: 36.06 km^{2} (13.92 sq mi)
- Established: 1984
- Governing body: Sabah Forestry Department

Lipaso Forest Reserve is a protected forest reserve in Telupid District of Sandakan Division, Sabah, Malaysia. It was designated as a Class 1 Protection Forest by the Sabah Forestry Department in 1984. Its area is 3,606 hectares (36.06 km^{2}). The reserve is mountainous with some palm oil plantations and farms in the surroundings. The forest is mostly mixed dipterocarp. Threats to the reserve forests include fires and encroachment for agriculture.

== Flora ==
Lipaso Forest Reserve hosts threatened tree species such as Dipterocarpus applanatus and Dipterocarpus confertus. Other reserve species include Dipterocarpus caudiferus and Parashorea malaanonan. The reserve hosts numerous Shorea species.

== Fauna ==
Lipaso Forest Reserve is home to a critically endangered species of frog, Leptobrachella palmata, which is known only from the reserve. Barking deer and wild boar also inhabit the reserve.
