= Gunung Rara Forest Reserve =

Rainforest area in Malaysia

Gunung Rara Forest Reserve is a rainforest area in Tawau Division, Sabah, Malaysia. Borneo elephants probably were killed in a concession area of Yayasan Sabah in the reserve. The concession was originally intended to be managed into perpetuity for the benefit of all Sabahans but was instead largely decimated by overharvesting. The reserve sits between Danum Valley and Maliau Basin Conservation areas. There are palm oil plantations in the reserve. The rainforests in Sabah are endangered by palm oil plantations.
