= Mandamai Forest Reserve =

Protected area in Sabah, Malaysia

- IUCN category Ia (strict nature reserve)
- Location within Borneo
- Location: Sabah, Malaysia
- Nearest city: Pitas, Pitas District
- Coordinates: 6°33′07″N 117°06′29″E
- Area: 53.3 km^{2} (20.6 sq mi)
- Established: 1984
- Governing body: Sabah Forestry Department

Mandamai Forest Reserve is a protected forest reserve in Pitas District of Kudat Division in Sabah, Malaysia. It was designated as a Class 1 Protection Forest by the Sabah Forestry Department in 1984. Its area is 5,330 hectares (53.3 km^{2}). The reserve is hilly, with the highest point being Mount Mabauk at 836 metres (2,743 ft). Two forest types make up the reserve: dipterocarp and kerangas. The main threat to the reserve forests is from fires.

== Flora ==
The most common species in Mandamai Forest Reserve are the tree species Dryobalanops beccarii and Shorea falciferoides. The reserve also hosts threatened tree species such as Shorea laevis, Dipterocarpus caudiferus and Dipterocarpus confertus. Other species include Barringtonia sarcostachys, Carallia borneensis, Castanopsis motleyana, Irvingia malayana, Lithocarpus gracilis, Mangifera pajang and Octomeles sumatrana.

== Fauna ==
Mandamai Forest Reserve is home to animals including barking deer and wild boar. Tracks of clouded leopard and sun bear have been observed.
