= Gomantong Forest Reserve =

Forest reserve in Sandakan, Sabah, Malaysia

- IUCN category Ia (strict nature reserve)
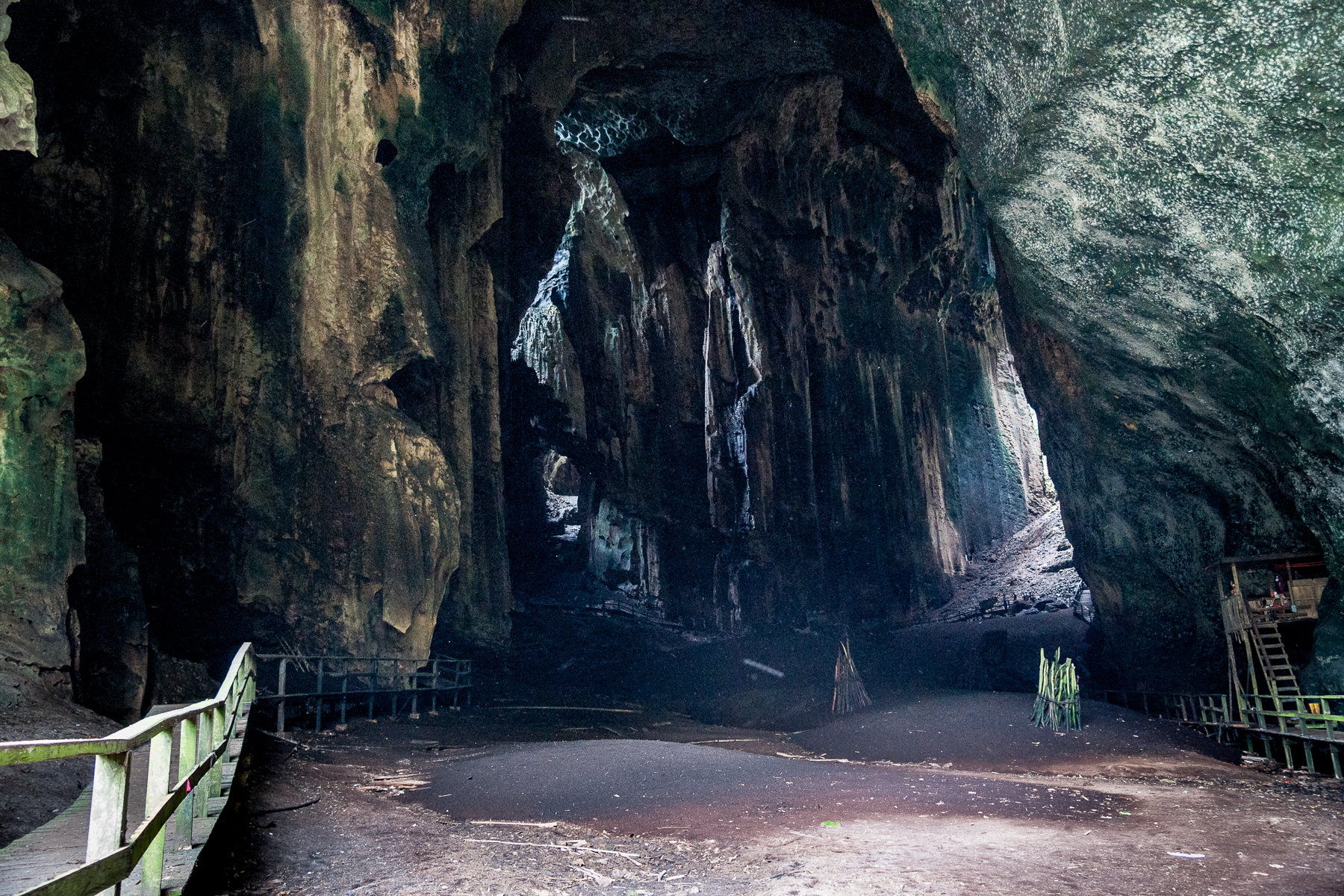
- Black Cave at Gomantong Caves

- Location within Borneo
- Location: Sabah, Malaysia
- Nearest city: Kinabatangan, Kinabatangan District
- Coordinates: 5°33′00″N 118°00′50″E
- Area: 32.97 km^{2} (12.73 sq mi)
- Established: 1984
- Governing body: Sabah Forestry Department

Gomantong Forest Reserve is a protected forest reserve in Sandakan and Kinabatangan Districts of Sandakan Division, Sabah, Malaysia. It was designated as a Class 1 Protection Forest by the Sabah Forestry Department in 1984. Its area is 3,297 hectares (32.97 km^{2}). The Gomantong Caves are within the reserve. Gomantong's terrain consists of low to moderate hills and flat areas with swamps. The forest is a mixture of dipterocarp and swamp forest.

== Flora ==
Gomantong Forest Reserve hosts threatened tree species such as Hopea beccariana, Shorea atrinervosa, Shorea hypoleuca and Dipterocarpus confertus. Swamp species include Mitragyna speciosa and Nephrolepis biserrata. The reserve hosts numerous Diospyros, Tristaniopsis, Campnosperma, Syzygium and Cordia species.

== Fauna ==
Gomantong Forest Reserve hosts migrating elephants. The reserve is home to maroon langur, orangutan, clouded leopard and bearded pigs
