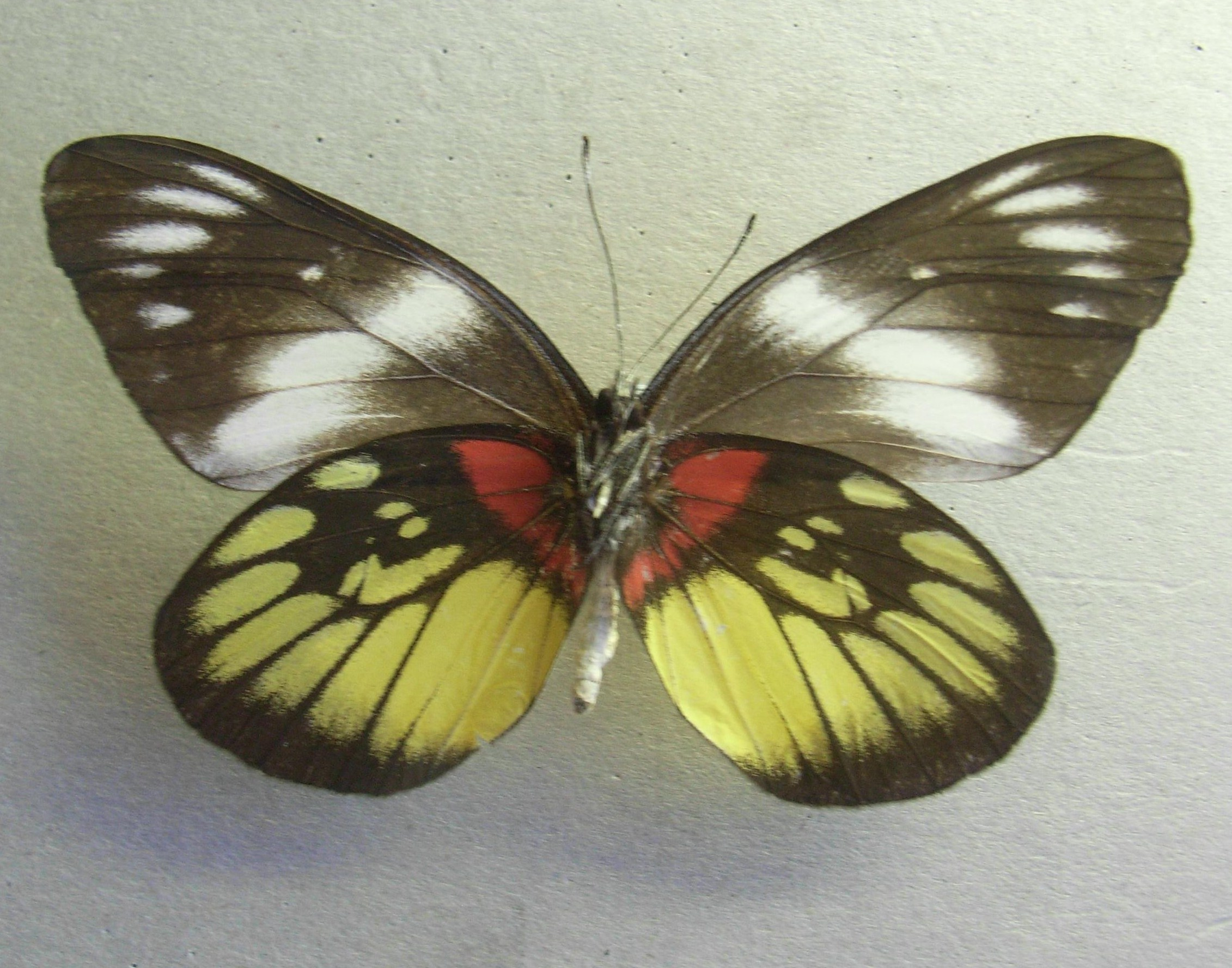

Scientific classification
- Domain: Eukaryota
- Kingdom: Animalia
- Phylum: Arthropoda
- Class: Insecta
- Order: Lepidoptera
- Family: Pieridae
- Genus: Delias
- Species: D. henningia

Binomial name
- Delias henningia (Eschscholtz, 1821)

Synonyms
- Pontia henningia Eschscholtz, 1821; Thyca lucerna Butler, 1869; Thyca ochreopicta Butler, 1869; Thyca pandemia Wallace, 1869

= Delias henningia =

Species of butterfly

Delias henningia, also called the Malayan Jezebel, is a butterfly in the family Pieridae. It was described by Johann Friedrich von Eschscholtz in 1821. It is found in the Indomalayan realm.

The wingspan is about 66–78 mm for males and 80–92 mm for females. Adults have a band on the upper forewing, which is bluish-grey in males and white in females. The hindwings have a large yellow patch. On the underside, the forewing band is white in both sexes.

== Subspecies ==
- D. h. henningia (Philippines: Luzon, Marinduque, Mindoro, Samar, Leyte, Negros and Panay)
- D. h. camotana Fruhstorfer, 1910 (Philippines: Camotes)
- D. h. ochreopicta Butler, 1869 (Philippines: Mindanao)
- D. h. palawana Yagishita, 1993 (Philippines: Palawan)
- D. h. pandemia (Wallace, 1869) (Borneo, Palawan)
- D. h. romblonensis Nakano & Yagishita, 1993 (Romblon Tablas, Sibuyan)
- D. h. voconia Fruhstorfer, 1910 (Philippines: Bohol)
