= Rajang Mangroves National Park =

National park in Malaysia

- IUCN category II (national park)
- Location within Borneo
- Location: Sarawak, Malaysia
- Nearest city: Sarikei
- Coordinates: 2°05′N 111°16′E
- Area: 107 km^{2} (41 sq mi)
- Established: 2000

The Rajang Mangroves National Park is a national park in Sarikei Division, Sarawak, Malaysia. It is home to species such as proboscis monkeys, silvered langurs, lesser adjutant storks, Irrawaddy dolphin and hornbills.

It has a very important role in preserving the coast, from the occurrence of erosion, tidal floods and salt intrusion.

== See also ==
- List of national parks of Malaysia
