= Bukit Kuamas Forest Reserve =

Protected area in Sabah, Malaysia

- IUCN category Ia (strict nature reserve)
- Location within Borneo
- Location: Sabah, Malaysia
- Nearest city: Telupid, Telupid District
- Coordinates: 5°42′27″N 117°10′03″E
- Area: 73.24 km^{2} (28.28 sq mi)
- Established: 1992
- Governing body: Sabah Forestry Department

Bukit Kuamas Forest Reserve is a protected forest reserve in Telupid District of Sandakan Division, Sabah, Malaysia. It was designated as a Class 1 Protection Forest by the Sabah Forestry Department in 1992. Its area is 7,324 hectares (73.24 km^{2}). The reserve is hilly and surrounded by palm oil plantations. The forest is mixed dipterocarp. Threats to the reserve forests include logging, fires and erosion.

== Flora ==
The reserve hosts threatened tree species such as Aquilaria malaccensis, Dipterocarpus acutangulus, Dipterocarpus confertus and Dipterocarpus lowii. Other species include Parashorea tomentella, Borneodendron aenigmaticum and Dryobalanops lanceolata. I has numerous Shorea species.

== Fauna ==
Animals include the red leaf monkey, sambar deer and mouse deer. The butterfly species Trogonoptera brookiana has been observed in the reserve.
