= Bukit Tiban National Park =

National park in Malaysia

- IUCN category II (national park)
- Location within Borneo
- Location: Sarawak, Malaysia
- Coordinates: 3°26′N 113°29′E
- Area: 96 km^{2} (37 sq mi)
- Established: 2000

The Bukit Tiban National Park is a national park in Bintulu Division, Sarawak, Malaysia. The park encloses the headwaters of the Sungai Nyalau and Sungai Timong rivers in the Miri Division and Sungai Sigrok, a tributary of Sungai Similajau in the Bintulu Division.

While the forest in the park was logged prior to 1985, most of the surrounding land has been converted to palm oil plantations, making the area an important refuge for remaining wildlife. Much of the eastern half of the park has however been converted to palm oil in the years since the park was established.

== See also ==
- List of national parks of Malaysia
