= Deramakot Forest Reserve =

Coordinates: 5°21′09.6″N 117°24′29.4″E

Deramakot Forest Reserve is a natural reserve in Sandakan, Sabah, Malaysia. It spans an area of 55,507 hectares. From July 1997 until October 2019 it was certified by Forest Stewardship Council for good forestry practices. This made it the longest certified tropical rainforest in the world. The certificate was terminated on October 30, 2019.
