= Borneodendron =

Conservation status
- Least Concern (IUCN 3.1)

Scientific classification
- Kingdom: Plantae
- Clade: Tracheophytes
- Clade: Angiosperms
- Clade: Eudicots
- Clade: Rosids
- Order: Malpighiales
- Family: Euphorbiaceae
- Subfamily: Crotonoideae
- Tribe: Ricinocarpeae
- Subtribe: Bertyinae
- Genus: Borneodendron; Airy Shaw
- Species: B. aenigmaticum

Binomial name
- Borneodendron aenigmaticum Airy Shaw

Genus of flowering plants

Borneodendron aenigmaticum is a species of tree in the family Euphorbiaceae of the monotypic genus Borneodendron. Its name means "enigmatic Borneo-plant"; so-called because it is a monotypic taxon and is endemic to north Borneo (Sabah). The species is specialised to ultramafic soils from 15 to 1070 meters elevation. It is found in numerous protected areas and is not considered threatened.
