= Tawai Forest Reserve =

Protected forest reserve in Malaysia

- IUCN category Ia (strict nature reserve)
- Location within Borneo
- Location: Sabah, Malaysia
- Nearest city: Telupid, Telupid District
- Coordinates: 5°35′25″N 117°06′23″E
- Area: 226.97 km^{2} (87.63 sq mi)
- Established: 1984
- Governing body: Sabah Forestry Department

Tawai Forest Reserve is a protected forest reserve in Telupid District of Sandakan Division, Sabah, Malaysia. It was first created in January 1972, before being designated as a Class 1 Protection Forest by the Sabah Forestry Department in 1984. It was fully demarcated in 2002, resulting in an area of 22,697 hectares (226.97 km^{2}). The reserve is mostly mountainous, consisting of ultramafic forest, upland mixed dipterocarp forest and kerangas forest. Mount Tawai, at 1,273 metres (4,177 ft), is within the reserve. It is flattest near its northern and eastern edges. The Tawai waterfall is located within the reserve, part of the many rivers which flow through it. Protection of these headwaters was part of the reason for the reserve's establishment. The reserve has been badly affected by fires that have spread into the reserve from nearby settlements and palm oil plantations. Illegal logging has occurred in areas of dipterocarp forest. Illegal logging and land clearance has occurred in some portions of the reserve. There are plans for the Pan-Borneo Highway to be expanded in part through the northern portion of the reserve. The forestry department runs a Rainforest Camp to generate tourism money, providing access to the clean river water of the reserve, rainforest treks, and a waystop near the path of the Sandakan Death Marches.

== Flora ==
1,070 floral species have been identified within Tawai Forest Reserve, 1030 flowering plants, 25 ferns, 13 gymnosperms, and 2 lycophytes. With 98 species endemic to Borneo, 35 endemic to Sabah, and 4 endemic to the local area, it has the highest endemism of forest reserves within inland Sabah. The area is important for tree species including Anisoptera, Dipterocarpus, Hopea and Shorea species. An orchid species, Paraphalaenopsis labukensis, is endemic to the area. The tree species Semecarpus angustifolius is also endemic here. The forests are in good condition, aside from areas near the border of the reserve, especially the Ruku Ruku valley in the northeast, which is mainly secondary forest. Most of the reserve is ultramafic forest. At least 38 dipterocarp species have been identified.

== Fauna ==
Tawai Forest Reserve is home to animals including wild boar, clouded leopard, barking deer, red leaf monkey and gibbon. Bird species include grey-breasted babbler and the near-threatened scarlet-breasted flowerpecker, with a total of 47 species being identified. Butterflies inhabit shaded areas, including the poorly understood Delias henningia. Borneo elephants inhabit parts of the reserve, often concentrated in flat areas that are being considered for highway expansion.
