= Mount Pock Forest Reserve =

Nature preserve in northern Borneo

- IUCN category Ia (strict nature reserve)
- Location within Borneo
- Location: Sabah, Malaysia
- Nearest city: Semporna, Semporna District
- Coordinates: 4°25′29″N 118°23′30″E
- Area: 78.048 km^{2} (30.135 sq mi)
- Established: 1984
- Governing body: Sabah Forestry Department

Mount Pock Forest Reserve is a protected forest reserve in Semporna District of Tawau Division, Sabah, Malaysia. It was designated as a Class 1 Protection Forest by the Sabah Forestry Department in 1984. Its area is 7,804.8 hectares (78.048 km^{2}). The reserve consists of steeply sloping terrain. The forest on lower slopes has been impacted by logging and conversion of land for agriculture. Oil palm plantations surround the reserve. The size of the reserve has decreased since its initial gazetting. In 2012, 1,388 ha (13.88 km^{2}) of the Mount Pock Reserve was reclassified as state land as this area, along with parts of other reserves, have been home to indigenous communities.

== Flora ==
Mount Pock Forest Reserve hosts threatened plant species such as Neolamarckia cadamba, Canarium odontophyllum, Knema elmeri, Durio acutifolius, Shorea parvifolia, Garcinia parvifolia, Koordersiodendron pinnatum, Shorea smithiana, Shorea superba, Shorea laevis, Parashorea malaanonan, Dryobalanops lanceolata and Parashorea tomentella. It also hosts Diospyros, Dipterocarpus, Lithocarpus and Syzygium species.

== Fauna ==
Mount Pock Forest Reserve is home to threatened mammals including pig-tailed macaque, gibbon, tufted ground squirrel and Bornean bearded pig.
