= Similajau National Park =

National park in Sarawak, Malaysia

- Samalaju National Park, Malaysia
- IUCN category II (national park)
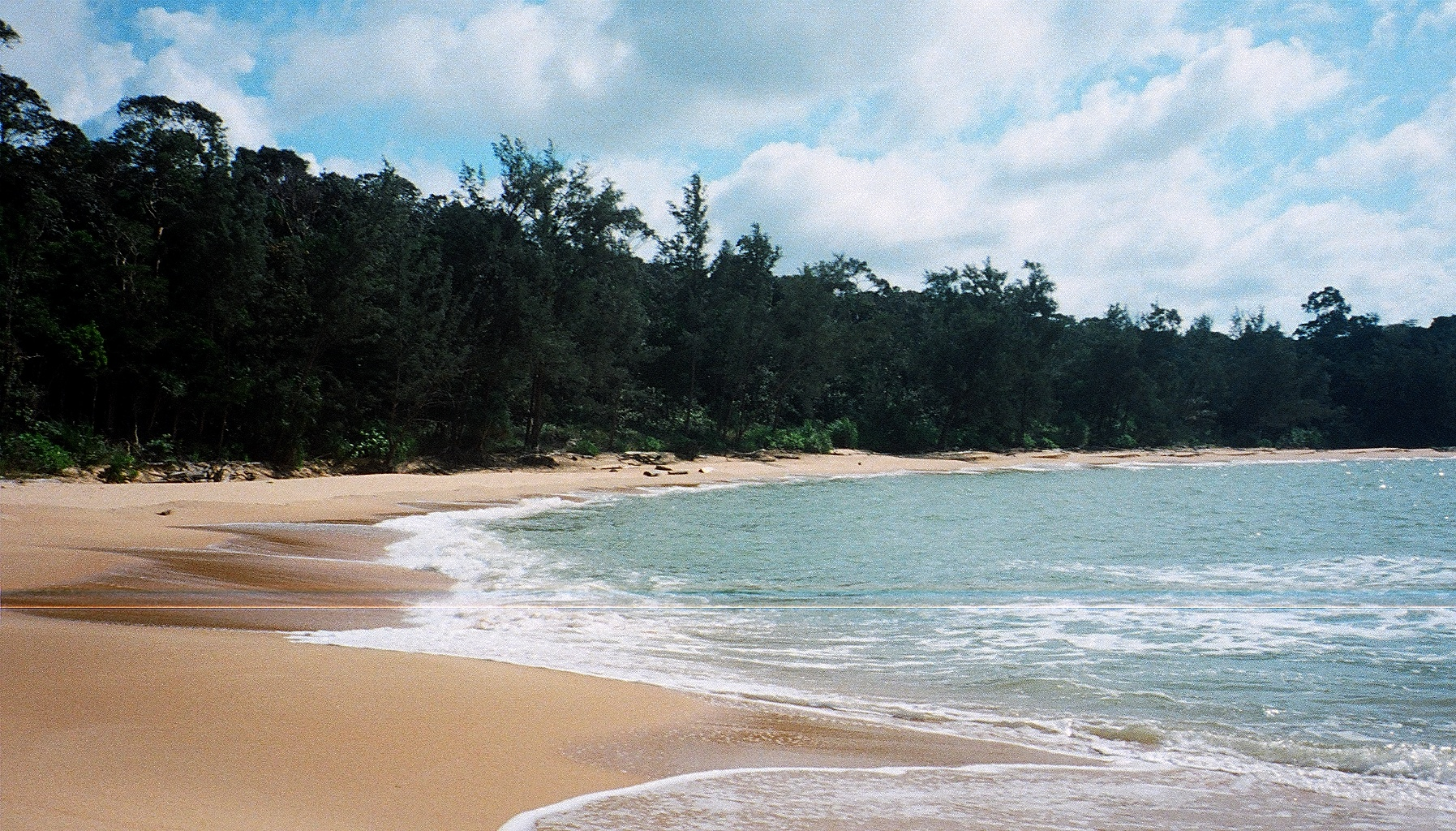
- Golden Beach at Similajau National Park

- Location within Malaysia
- Location: Bintulu Division, Sarawak, Malaysia
- Nearest city: Bintulu
- Coordinates: 3°25′26″N 113°13′59″E
- Area: 89.96 km^{2} (22,230 acres)
- Established: 1976
- Website: www.sarawakforestry.com/htm/snp-np-siminajau.html

Similajau National Park (or Samalaju National Park), is a national park in the Bintulu Division of Sarawak, Malaysia. It is located about 30 kilometres (19 mi) from Bintulu.

== Formation ==
The national park, facing the South China Sea, contains rainforests, beaches, and rocky shores. Initially, the park covered an area of 70.64 km^{2} (17,460 acres), extending from Sungai Likau in the south to Sungai Similajau in the north over a distance of 30 kilometres (19 mi). On February 17, 2000, an additional 19.32 km^{2} (4,770 acres)19.32 km² was incorporated into the park, expanding its total size to 89.96 km^{2} (22,230 acres) along a narrow coastal stretch.

== Flora ==
The flora consists of three main types: beach, kerangas, and mixed dipterocarpaceae forest. The tongkat ali (Eurycoma longifolia) is a small and slender tree that can grow as high as 15 metres (49 ft). It produces a cluster of finger-sized red fruits that have a bitter taste. On maturity, its fruits turn black. This tree is more common in Similajau than in any other national park in Sarawak. The bintangor (Barringtonia asiatica) can be found in both the hills and swamp forest of Sarawak.

== Fauna ==
The park has 24 recorded species of mammals, including primates such as gibbons, banded langurs, and long-tailed macaques. A total of 185 species have been identified in the park including hornbills and migratory water birds like the Storm's stork. There are 8 species of hornbill recorded in Sarawak including the rhinoceros hornbill and the black hornbill, which can be found in the park. Occasionally, green sea turtles come ashore to lay their eggs.

12 out of the 20 marine mammals recorded in Malaysia can be found in Sarawak. These include whales, dugongs, and dolphins. Five species of dolphin have been recorded in Bintulu waters: the Irrawaddy dolphin, bottlenose dolphin, Indo-Pacific humpback dolphin, finless porpoise, and pantropical spotted dolphin. Dolphins can be seen in the park from March to September every year. They are often spotted in groups of four or more during the early morning.

The crocodiles in the Likau River consist of two species of riverine crocodiles in the park: the false gharial and saltwater crocodile. The saltwater crocodile is very dangerous and has been responsible for many fatal attack in Sarawak. The false gharial is generally shy and passive, but on rare occasions fatal attacks have been confirmed in Central Kalimantan and Sumatra.

The horseshoe crab often appears during the dry season from early May to October. They usually appear in pairs. The males are smaller in size compared to the females, who come to the shore to lay eggs. During the breeding season, Sagor catfishesSagor Catfishes can be seen feeding on the eggs.

== Main attractions ==
=== Batu Mandi ===
About 4 km (2.5 mi) off the shore of Kuala Sungai Likau. It can be reached only by boat. Noticeable from the park only during low tide.

=== Batu Anchau ===
A black rock surface situated at the end reach of the Batu Anchau trail about 2 km (1.2 mi) from the park office.

=== Selunsur Rapids ===
Rapids that exists at the end reach of the Selunsur Rapid trail, about 6.8 km (4.2 mi) from the park office. They can be seen clearly after a heavy downpour.

=== Turtle Beach ===
There are two units of Turtle Beach, Turtle Beach I and II. They are located about 6 and 7 km (3.7 and 4.3 mi) away from the park office. They are where turtles go to lay eggs. This happens from March till September annually.

=== Sebubong Pool ===
A natural pool at the Sebubong River. It can only be reached by boat.

== Nature trails ==
=== Main trail (red mark) ===
This trail covers 9.8 kilometres (6.1 mi), reaching the Golden Beach, and can be reached by hiking or boat.

=== Education trail (green mark) ===
This trail consists of two parts: one is a 450 m (0.28 mi) plank along the mangrove forest and another is a 600 metres (0.37 mi) jungle trail. Park office staff teach about the various tree species.

=== Circular trail (red/white mark) ===
This trail starts from the end of the mangrove plank walk and meets the main trail at 0.5 kilometres (0.31 mi) with a total distance of 1.7 km (1.1 mi).

=== Batu Anchau trail (white mark) ===
This trail has a total distance of 2.1 km (1.3 mi) and ends up at the Batu Anchau rock surface.
