= Balembangan Forest Reserve =

Protected area in Sabah, Malaysia

- IUCN category Ia (strict nature reserve)
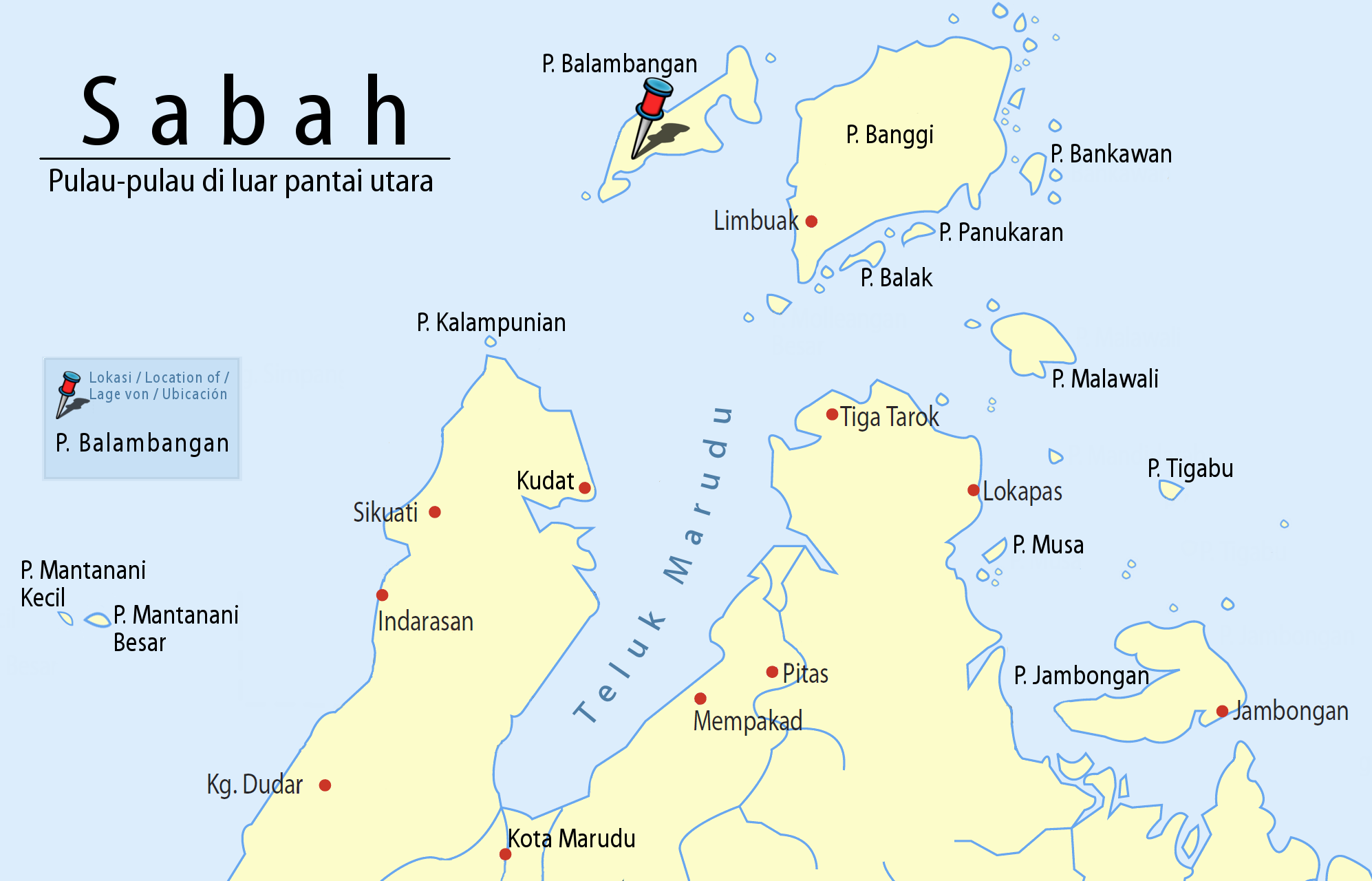
- Location in Borneo

- Location within Borneo
- Location: Sabah, Malaysia
- Nearest city: Kudat, Kudat District
- Coordinates: 7°12′29″N 116°52′01″E
- Area: 3.71 km^{2} (1.43 sq mi)
- Established: 1984
- Governing body: Sabah Forestry Department

Balembangan Forest Reserve is a protected forest reserve on Balambangan Island, off the northern tip of Borneo. The reserve is part of Kudat District in Kudat Division, Sabah, Malaysia. It was designated as a Class 1 Protection Forest by the Sabah Forestry Department in 1984. Its area is 371 hectares (3.71 km^{2}). Balembangan's terrain is rugged and steep inland, with flat coastal areas of mangroves.

== Flora ==
Balembangan Forest Reserve hosts dipterocarp tree species including Dipterocarpus grandiflorus, Shorea faguetiana and Vatica maritima. Mangrove species include Ceriops decandra, Rhizophora apiculata, Rhizophora stylosa and Sonneratia alba. Pandanus tectorius grows freely in watery areas behind the mangroves.

== Fauna ==
Balembangan Forest Reserve is home to mouse deer, sambar deer and wild boar. Saltwater crocodiles and long-tailed macaques have also been observed.
