= Tabin Wildlife Reserve =

Nature Reserve in Sabah, Malaysia

Tabin Wildlife Reserve Taman Hidupan Liar Tabin
- IUCN category IV (habitat/species management area)
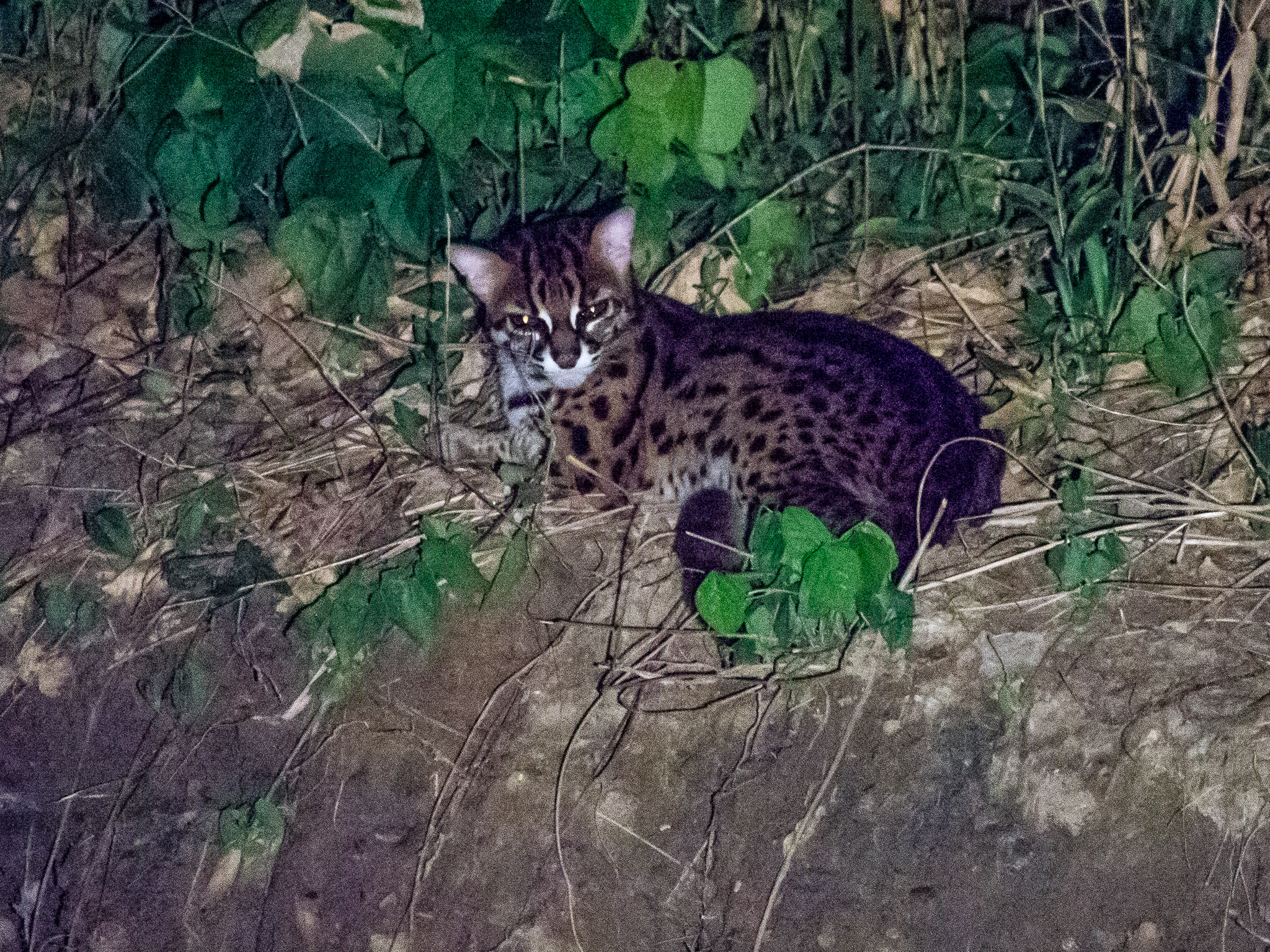
- A Leopard cat in the reserve

- Location within Borneo
- Location: Sabah, Malaysia
- Coordinates: 5°16′N 118°39′E
- Area: 1,225 km^{2} (473 sq mi)
- Established: 1984
- Governing body: Sabah Parks

The Tabin Wildlife Reserve (Malay: Taman Hidupan Liar Tabin) is a nature preserve in Sabah, Malaysia. It was created in 1984 to preserve Sabah's disappearing wild animals. Occupying a large part of the peninsula forming the northern headland of Darvel Bay, it is located 48 kilometres east of Lahad Datu.

Tabin Wildlife Reserve (TWR or Tabin) comprises a rectangular area of approximately 122,539 ha. in the centre of the Dent Peninsula, north-east of Lahad Datu town, south of the lower reaches of the Segama River and north of the Silabukan Protection Forest Reserve. It can be reached via sealed and gravel roads from Lahad Datu in about 40 minutes. The reserve is covered with lowland dipterocarp forest.

== Fauna ==
Tabin has been declared a wildlife reserve primarily on account of the large number of animals inhabiting its forests, some of which are highly endangered. The three largest mammals of Sabah – the Borneo elephant, Bornean rhinoceros (a subspecies of the Sumatran rhinoceros) and tembadau (Bos javanicus), are all found within the reserve. The elephant population has been estimated to 120-300 animals in 1993. Other ungulate species include sambar, muntjac and mouse deer. In addition seven of Sabah's eight primate species are present, among them orangutan and proboscis monkey. However, these two species occur in relatively low numbers in the reserve. The biggest predator in the reserve is the Sunda clouded leopard. There are also several other smaller carnivores in the reserve. Of bird species, 42 families representing 220 species have been recorded.

== Organisation ==
The land belongs to the people of Sabah. It is under government ownership and has Reserve status. The Sabah Wildlife Department is the custodian of the animals in the reserve. The Sabah Forestry Department is responsible for the trees in Tabin. In 1998, the Malaysian government privatised ecotourism programmes for Tabin and over the last few years increasing numbers of tourists have been coming to the reserve. Among activities permitted in the reserve are jungle trekking, wildlife viewing, photography and filming. Natural mud volcanoes are an important natural attraction for wildlife seeking salt, and these have become a bonus for visitors coming to see wild animals.

== See also ==
- 1984 in the environment
