= Kuching Wetlands National Park =

National park in Malaysia

- Taman Negara Tanah Lembap Kuching
- IUCN category II (national park)
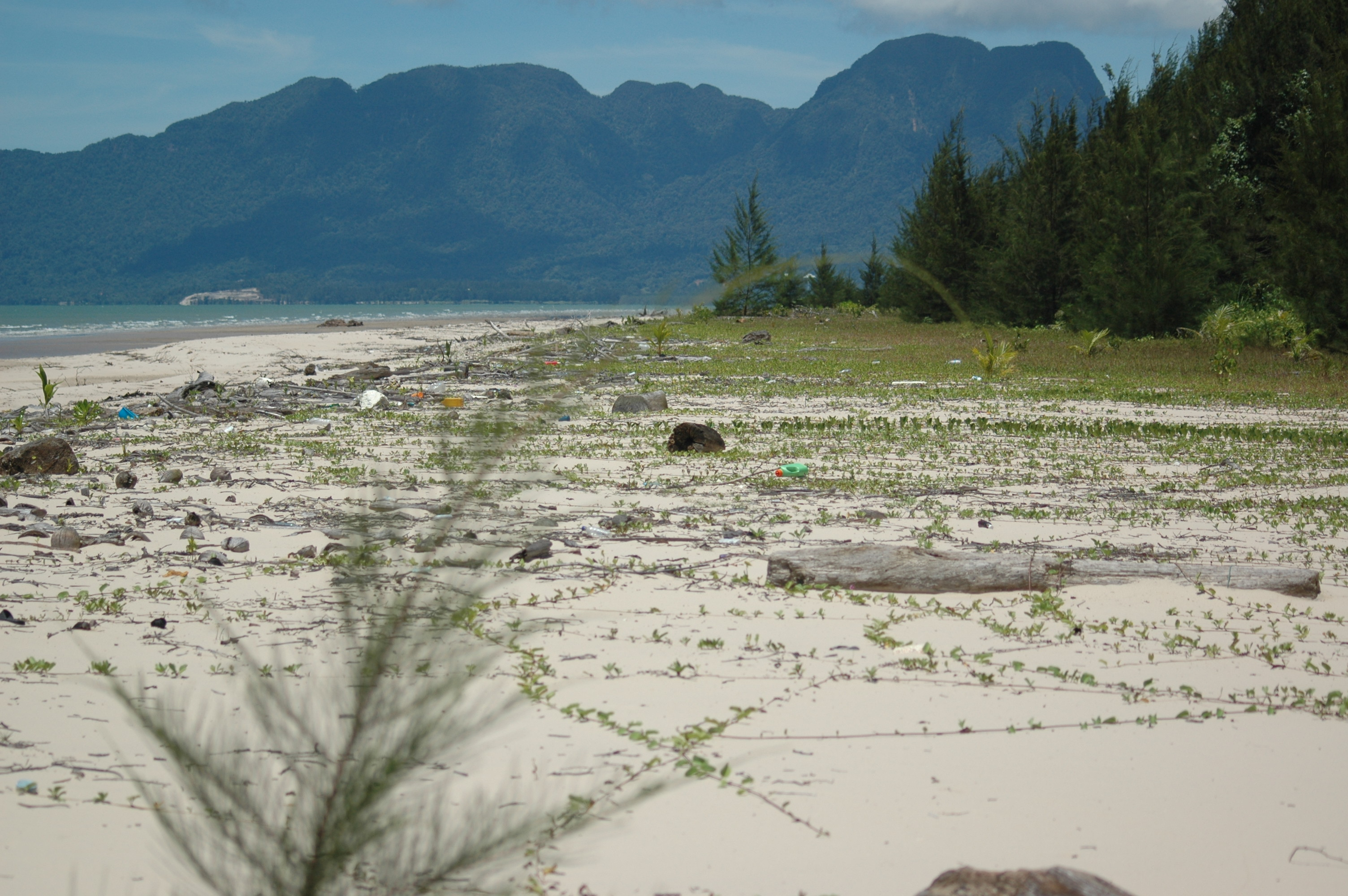
- View of the beach and pine habitat towards Mt. Santubong

- Location within Borneo
- Location: Sarawak, Malaysia
- Nearest city: Kuching
- Coordinates: 1°41′N 110°15′E
- Area: 84.95 km^{2} (32.80 sq mi)
- Established: 1992
- Governing body: Sarawak Forestry

Ramsar Wetland
- Designated: 8 November 2005
- Reference no.: 1568

The Kuching Wetlands National Park (KWNP; Malay: Taman Negara Tanah Lembap Kuching) is a national park in Petra Jaya, Kuching District, Kuching Division, Sarawak, Malaysia. It is the remains of the former Sarawak Mangrove Forest Reserve which covered 170 km^{2}.

Located 30 km from Kuching, the Wetlands National Park was gazetted in 1992 and covers an area of 66.1 km^{2} on the estuarine reaches of the Sibu Laut and Salak rivers. The park is composed of coastal, marine and freshwater ecosystems. The predominantly saline and deltaic mangrove system includes an extensive network of marine waterways and tidal creeks, formed by the interconnecting rivers of Sungei Sibu-Laut, Batang Salak and Sungei Santubong that form the boundary of the park. Some small patches of heath forest are found within the park.

== Biodiversity ==
The park is the home of at least three predominantly arboreal primates; the endangered proboscis monkey (Nasalis larvatus), the long-tailed macaques and the silvered langurs. White-bellied sea eagles, mudskippers and horseshoe crabs are also present. Hairy-nosed otters, Irrawaddy dolphins, and saltwater crocodiles can also be sighted. On nearby Mount Santubong, hornbills can be seen.

== Historical interest ==
In the 12th century, the area was an important trading post between the interior peoples for their jungle produce predominantly animal parts valuable in Chinese medicine traded with the Chinese for their pottery and earthenwares. Past and existing excavations have unearthed remains of the former Iron smelting industries active hundreds of years past. The Impressive Mt. Santubong acted as a clear navigational point for these traders no doubt.

== Future ==
Many jobs depend upon this habitat for the rich abundance of fish that are spawned and grow amongst the protection of the root systems. Timber is extracted for construction and several charcoal factories. The tourism industry is starting to grow offering wildlife cruises. The heavy decline in the proboscis monkey population caused by hunting, was largely arrested by the educational efforts of the Sarawak Forestry department protecting and banning the trade of these animals.

Mangroves serve as important coastal defences absorbing strong waves and reputably up to 95% of the waves energy in extreme cases, such as a tsunami or king tide limiting damage. This attribute alone should be cause to justify their existence.

Extensive development predominantly housing but including quarrying and retail premises is occurring outside the parks boundary. These habitats are used by the many animals found in the park, thus increasing the pressure on this small reserve. As future development increases surrounding the park the existing gene pool will have to suffice since breeding between animals outside the park will no longer be possible.

== Conservation ==
One suggestion is to: Protect a corridor/strip of land from development for the purpose of migration and breeding of animal species between other nearby habitats. Implementation would be possible with government intervention since existing routes are still currently feasible i.e. some undeveloped tracts still exist.

Kuching wetlands N. P. is only about 20 km from Bako National Park which is well catered for receiving visitors.

== See also ==
- List of national parks of Malaysia
