= Ulu Kalumpang Forest Reserve =

Protected forest reserve in Malaysia

- IUCN category Ia (strict nature reserve)
- Location within Borneo
- Location: Sabah, Malaysia
- Nearest city: Tawau
- Coordinates: 4°36′N 117°57′E
- Area: 513 km^{2} (198 sq mi)
- Established: 1992
- Governing body: Sabah Forestry Department

Ulu Kalumpang Forest Reserve is a region in Sabah, Malaysia. Located on the Tawau Peninsula, it was designated as a conservation area by the Sabah Forestry Department in 1992. The forest reserve is in an area called the Tawau Highlands, which also includes Tawau Hills National Park. The forest reserve is very mountainous, especially towards the south. A statewide orang-utan census carried out by HUTAN (an NGO based in Sukau, Kinabatangan) and the Sabah Wildlife Department estimated an Orang-utan population density of 0.42 individual/km^{2} within the forest reserve. This orang-utan population of ~ 183 individuals is totally isolated and its long-term survival is insecure.
