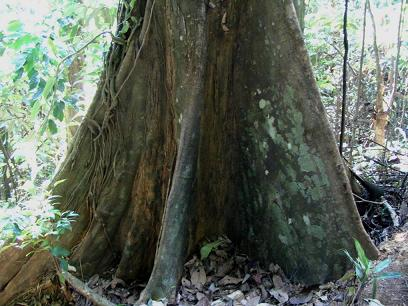
- Base of trunk

Conservation status
- Vulnerable (IUCN 3.1)

Scientific classification
- Kingdom: Plantae
- Clade: Tracheophytes
- Clade: Angiosperms
- Clade: Eudicots
- Clade: Rosids
- Order: Malvales
- Family: Dipterocarpaceae
- Genus: Hopea
- Species: H. beccariana

Binomial name
- Hopea beccariana Burck

Synonyms
- Balanocarpus ovalifolius Ridl.; Hancea beccariana (Burck) Pierre; Hancea beccarii (Burck) Pierre; Hopea intermedia King; Hopea nicholsonii F.Heim

= Hopea beccariana =

Species of tropical tree

Hopea beccariana is a species of tree in the family Dipterocarpaceae. It is named after the Italian botanist Odoardo Beccari, and is known in Singapore as merawan batu.

== Description ==
Hopea beccariana grows up to 45 metres (150 ft) tall, with a trunk diameter of up to 1.6 m (5 ft). It has buttress roots. The bark is fissured. The leathery leaves are ovate and measure up to 8 cm (3 in) long. The inflorescences measure up to 8 cm (3 in) long and bear up to five cream flowers.

== Distribution and habitat ==
Hopea beccariana is native to Thailand, Peninsular Malaysia, Sumatra and Borneo. Its habitat is in dipterocarp forests and on coastal hills, at elevations of 150–1,200 m (500–3,900 ft).

== Conservation ==
Hopea beccariana has been assessed as vulnerable on the IUCN Red List. It is threatened by conversion of land for agriculture and by logging for its timber. The species is found in some protected areas.
