= Tanjung Datu National Park =

National park in Kuching Division, Sarawak, Malaysia

- IUCN category II (national park)
- Location within Borneo
- Location: Sarawak, Malaysia
- Coordinates: 2°02′N 109°38.5′E
- Area: 7.3 km^{2} (2.8 sq mi)
- Established: 1994

The Tanjung Datu National Park (Malay: Taman Negara Tanjung Datu) is a national park located in Kuching Division, Sarawak, Malaysia. It is situated in the far west of the state and covers an area of 14 square kilometers.

== See also ==
- List of national parks of Malaysia
