= Bidu Bidu Forest Reserve =

Protected natural area in Malaysia

- Location within Borneo
- Location: Sabah, Malaysia
- Nearest city: Telupid, Beluran
- Coordinates: 5°48′N 117°16′E
- Area: 157 km^{2} (61 sq mi)
- Established: 1984
- Governing body: Sabah Forestry Department

Bidu Bidu Forest Reserve is in the Beluran district in Sandakan Division, Sabah, Malaysia. It was designated as a class I protection forest by the Sabah Forestry Department in 1984. The forest reserve is hilly with very steep slopes. Mt. Bangau Bangau (648 m) is the highest peak in the reserve. The Bakong Bakong Waterfall, situated near the northern boundary of the reserve, is a local attraction. The forest reserve is a very important area for the conservation of ultramafic forest in Sabah and harbours many interesting plants, including the Sabah endemic Borneodendron aenigmaticum.
