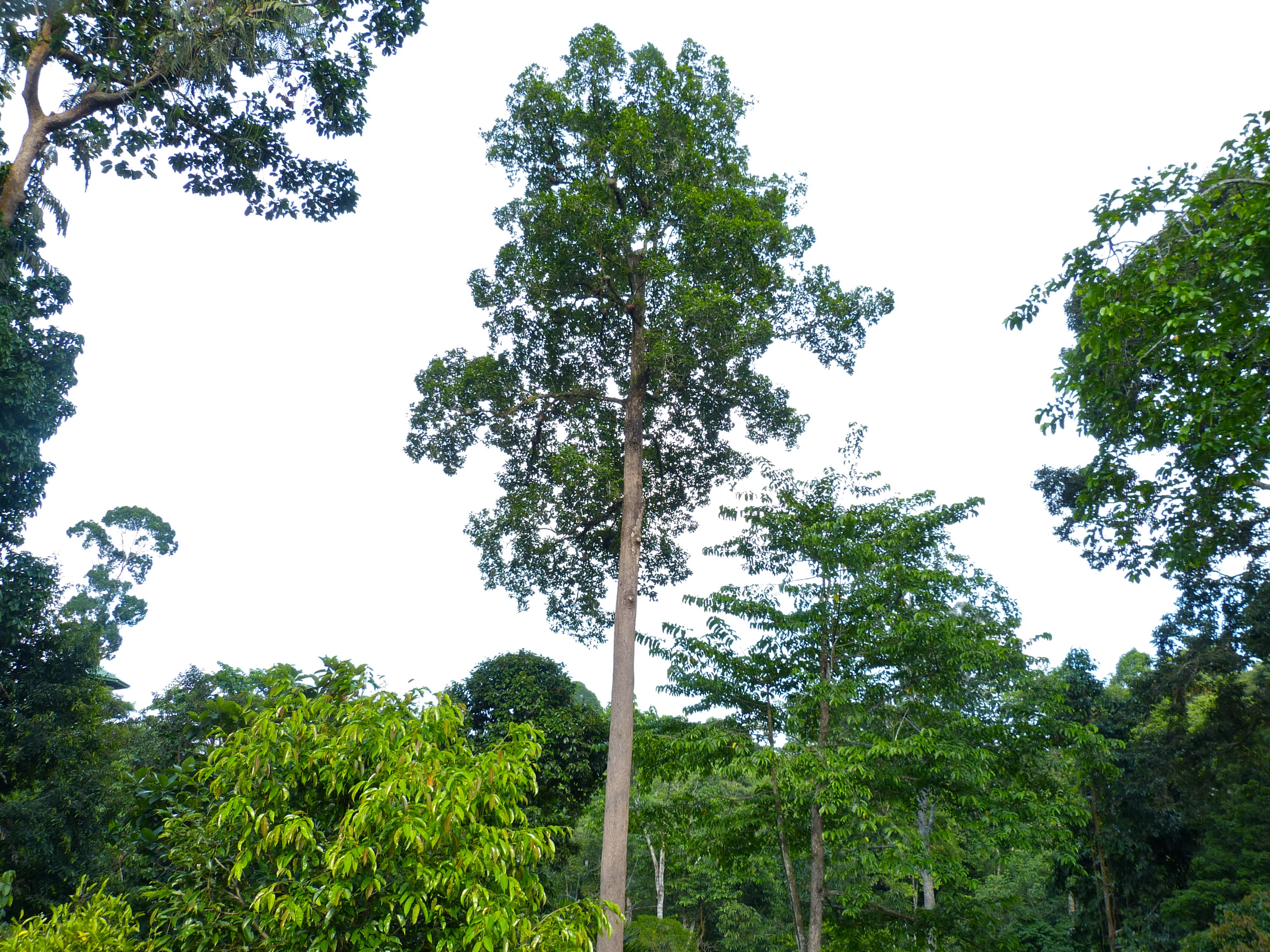

Conservation status
- Near Threatened (IUCN 3.1)

Scientific classification
- Kingdom: Plantae
- Clade: Tracheophytes
- Clade: Angiosperms
- Clade: Eudicots
- Clade: Rosids
- Order: Malvales
- Family: Dipterocarpaceae
- Genus: Dipterocarpus
- Species: D. caudiferus

Binomial name
- Dipterocarpus caudiferus Merr.

Synonyms
- Dipterocarpus kutaianus Slooten; Dipterocarpus macrorrhinus Slooten

= Dipterocarpus caudiferus =

Species of tree

Dipterocarpus caudiferus is a species of tree in the family Dipterocarpaceae, endemic to Borneo. It grows as a large tree, up to 65 metres (200 ft) in height. Its habitat is mixed dipterocarp forests up to 800 m (2,600 ft) elevation. Dipterocarpus caudiferus is threatened mainly by conversion of land for palm oil plantations.
