= Silabukan Protection Forest Reserve =

- IUCN category Ia (strict nature reserve)
- Location within Borneo
- Location: Sabah, Malaysia
- Coordinates: 5°00′04″N 118°45′18″E
- Area: 114 km^{2} (44 mi^{2})
- Established: 1992

The Silabukan Protection Forest Reserve is located in Sabah, Malaysia. It was established in 1992. This site covers an area of 114 km^{2} (44 mi^{2}). Although 8% of Sabah's land area is included in the system of national parks, most of Sabah's orangutans do not occur in official protected areas, they are instead found in production forest landscapes in the eastern Sabah Foundation concession, which includes Silabukan Forest Reserve (McConkey et al. 2005).

== Flora and fauna ==
In 2022, a blooming Rafflesia keithii was discovered in the reserve during a World Wildlife Fund inventory.
