= Valpuesta (disambiguation) =

Valpuesta is a commune in Spain.

Valpuesta may also refer to:

== People ==
- Macario Valpuesta (born 1959), Spanish jurist
- Rosario Valpuesta (1953–2013), Spanish academic

== Other uses ==
- Cartularies of Valpuesta, Spanish cartularies
