= Committee on Social Inclusion, Participative Democracy and Human Rights =

Committee of the United Cities and Local Governments

UCLG Committee on Social Inclusion, Participatory Democracy and Human Rights
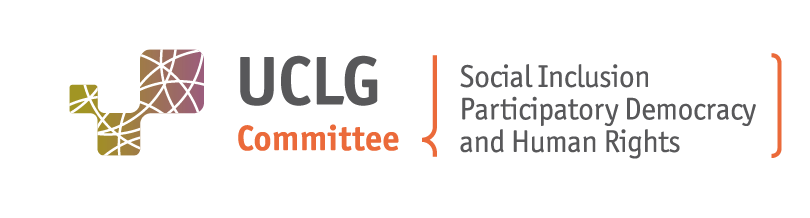
- Abbreviation: UCLG CSIPDHR
- Predecessor: Forum of Local Authorities for Social Inclusion and Participatory Democracy (FAL)
- Formation: 2005
- Type: International organization of local governments
- Legal status: Active
- Headquarters: Barcelona, Spain
- Members: 145 (2018)
- Official language: English, French and Spanish
- Co-chairs: Patrick Braouezec, Jang-hyun Yoon, Stéphane Troussel and José Ramón Amieva
- Parent organization: United Cities and Local Governments
- Website: www.uclg-cisdp.org

The UCLG Committee on Social Inclusion, Participatory Democracy and Human Rights is one of the four Committees of the United Cities and Local Governments. As an autonomous network in the framework of UCLG, its stated goal is to bring together local authorities from across the world to exchange points of view and local initiatives on social inclusion, participatory democracy and human rights. Inheritor of the forums of local authorities (FAL) held in parallel to the first editions of the World Social Forum, the committee has become a relevant stakeholder in global advocacy for human rights in the city and the Right to the City Throughout its history, the Committee been characterized by facilitating meetings and networking between progressive local authorities, with a special emphasis in the Latin American and European region. Headquartered in Barcelona, the committee is composed by more than 100 local governments and various partner organizations (among which, the Global Platform for the Right to the City).

== History ==
The origins of the committee lie in the first Local Authorities Forum for Social Inclusion and Participatory Democracy (FAL), a forum for reflection and political discussion made up by progressive local authorities from all over the world, an event which has been held at the same time as the World Social Forum since 2001. In 2005, a year after the creation of the new international organisation of local governments – United Cities and Local Governments (UCLG) – the towns of the FAL decided to establish a more institutionalised working structure within a new organisation. This led to the creation of the Committee on Social Inclusion and Participatory Democracy (CSIPD).

Since its beginnings, the CSIPD has been present at the various FAL events (Caracas, 2005; Nairobi, 2007 and Belém do Pará, 2009; Dakar, 2011) and has maintained an ongoing dialogue with international social movements and civil society in the international social forums held in those cities. It has thus become the communication channel between the political debates held in these events and UCLG, and has undertaken its own political initiatives based mainly on two areas: social inclusion and participatory democracy. A third area, human rights, was added to the committee's work soon afterwards, and was extensively developed with the production of two documents, the Global Charter-Agenda for Human Rights in the city (formally adopted by the Florence UCLG World Council in 2011) and the European Charter for the Safeguarding of Human Rights in the city (Saint-Denis, 2000). As a result, five years after it was established, the Committee on Social Inclusion and Participative Democracy has renamed itself as follows: Committee on Social Inclusion, Participatory Democracy and Human Rights.

== Organisation ==
The committee consists of:

- local governments (individual cities or associations of local governments);
- local government networks;
- partners (universities and civil society organisations).

Becoming a member of the committee is free and must be arranged through UCLG's World Secretariat and the committee's Executive Technical Secretariat. The committee aims to ensure balanced geographic representation, and those members not belonging to UCLG will be encouraged to adhere to the organisation.

== Government Structure and Tasks ==
The 102 committee members are the plenary body, which is responsible for defining the general political directives of the committee.

Specification and implementation of the political directives will be the responsibility of the committee's bureau, which consists of a President, First Vice-president and several Regional Vice-presidents. The committee will ensure balanced political representation in its bureau. We propose the following governing body for the period 2011 – 2013:

President: Barcelona (Spain) First Vice-president: Saint-Denis / Plaine Commune (France) Regional Vice-presidents: Africa: Passy (Senegal) Latin America: Guarulhos (Brazil) and Montevideo (Uruguay) Asia: Federation of Municipalities of Sri Lanka (Sri Lanka) Europe: Aubagne, Nantes (France) and FAMSI (Spain)

The president of the committee is its leading political representative. The First Vice-president will be in charge of the institutional relations of the committee in general, and will particularly participate at UCLG statutory meetings on behalf of the committee. The regional vice-presidents will contribute to expanding the work of the committee in their respective territorial areas and will represent it on a collegiate basis. The members of the bureau will ensure the financing of the committee.

Working groups can be created based around the committee's three areas of work (social inclusion, participatory democracy and human rights) in order to contribute to the development of each one of these areas, and they will support the bureau in the definition and execution of the working plan. Each working group will be chaired by a bureau member. Nowadays the committee has a working group on Local Economic Development, chaired and coordinated by the FAMSI (Andalucian Fund of Towns for International Solidarity). This group has its own Strategic Plan 2012–2013.

The Executive Technical Secretary will be responsible for co-ordinating the implementation of the working plan, fostering the 3 groups and organising and following up committee meetings.

=== Members ===
List of members.

== Operation ==
The committee meets once or twice a year in a plenary session to monitor the progress of its strategic objectives. Committee meetings will take place at the statutory meetings of UCLG (Executive Bureau, World Council or World Congress) or on the occasion of events organised by a city, international network or organisation with which the committee collaborates.

The political directives of the committee will be specified in these meetings, and will be produced using participatory methodologies with decisions reached on the basis of consensus. Members that are unable to attend these meetings will be able to send their contributions in writing to the Executive Technical Secretary, who will be responsible for presenting them at the meeting and duly informing of the decisions taken.

The committee's working groups can also convene sectorial meetings, the proposals of which will be notified to the bureau by the Executive Technical Secretary for assessment.

The working languages of the committee are Spanish, English and French.

== Right to the City ==
The 1990s was a milestone in terms of recognition of the role of local governments as pillars of states' democratic quality. Some years later, recognition of cities as key players in the guarantee of human rights in their role of providers of public services and agents responsible for education, health and housing policies would gain ground. This international debate would be translated in the claim for "the right to the city", according to which the city is a collective space which belongs to all its residents and which must offer the necessary conditions for a decent life from a social, political, cultural, economic and environmental point of view. As a result of this process, various local human rights charters were adopted from 2000 onwards:

- the European Charter for the Safeguarding of Human Rights in the city (Saint-Denis, 2000), signed by more than 350 European cities.
- the World Charter on the Right to the city, drafted by social movements gathered in the World Social Forum in Porto Alegre (2001).
- the Charter of Rights and Responsibilities of Montreal (2006).
- the Mexico City Charter for the Right to the city (2010).
- the Gwangju Human Rights Charter (South Korea, 2012).

The concept of the "right to a solidarity-based metropolis" would emerge afterwards intensively in the framework of the Forum of Peripheral Local Authorities (FALP) and is now being developed.

=== European Charter for the Safeguarding of Human Rights in the City ===
The European Charter for the Safeguarding of Human Rights in the city (Saint Denis, 2000) is the result of the preparatory work initiated in Barcelona in 1998 in the framework of the Conference "Cities for Human Rights", which was organised to commemorate the 50th Anniversary of the Universal Declaration of Human Rights. Hundreds of Mayors and political representatives participated in the event and united their voice to call for a stronger political acknowledgement as key actors in safeguarding human rights in a highly urbanised world.

Participating cities adopted the "Barcelona Engagement", consisting of a roadmap to draft a political document aimed at fostering the respect, protection and fulfilment of human rights at local level.

During the two proceeding years, the European Charter for the Safeguarding of Human Rights in the city was drafted as the result of a plural dialogue between European cities, civil society representatives and human rights experts. The draft was discussed and finally adopted in Saint-Denis in 2000. Since then, a European conference is held every two years to share the progress made by signatory cities, more than 400 today, to implement the Charter. The following conferences have been organized to date:

- 1998, Barcelona (Spain)
- 2000, Saint-Denis (France)
- 2002, Venice (Italy)
- 2004, Nuremberg (Germany)
- 2006, Lyon (France)
- 2008, Geneva (Switzerland)
- 2010, Tuzla (Bosnia-Herzegovina)

After the conference in Geneva (2008), the most active cities in the network (Barcelona, Saint-Denis/Plaine Commune, Lyon, Geneva and Nantes) decided to entrust the promotion of the European Charter for the Safeguarding of Human Rights in the city to the world organization of cities, United Cities and Local Governments (UCLG), through its Committee on Social Inclusion, Participatory Democracy and Human Rights.

The committee, initially under the political leadership of the Provincial Council of Barcelona (Spain) and subsequently the city of Nantes (France), was working since 2006 on the production of a municipal charter of human rights with a worldwide scope, the Global Charter-Agenda for Human Rights in the city. UCLG formally adopted this charter in 2011 at its World Council in Florence, which was attended by over 400 mayors from all over the world.

The main differences between the Charter-Agenda and the European Charter lie, on the one hand, in the different geographic scope of each document (one is global, while the other is European) and, on the other hand, in the agenda or local action plan that the Charter-Agenda contains. As a result, in the Global Charter-Agenda for Human Rights in the City each right is accompanied by an action plan that is a benchmark for use by local governments when taking concrete steps for human rights implementation.

=== Global Charter-Agenda for Human Rights in the City ===
In order to contribute to the international promotion of the right to the city, the UCLG Committee on Social Inclusion, Participatory Democracy and Human Rights drafted the Global Charter-Agenda for Human Rights in the city, an initiative that emerged from the Local Authorities Forum for Social Inclusion and Participatory Democracy (FAL) that took place in Caracas in 2006. Based on the discussions between local governments from around the world that took place in this Forum, a group of experts from various countries wrote a first draft (2007–2008), which was then discussed and amended by elected representatives, experts and representatives of civil society from all over the world (2009–2010).

Under the leadership initially of the Provincial Deputation of Barcelona and subsequently of the city of Nantes and the Pays de la Loire Region, the Global Charter-Agenda has been collectively discussed at several international events, including the last three FALs and World Social Forums (Nairobi, 2007; Belém do Pará, 2009; and Dakar, 2011), the I and II FALPs (Nanterre, 2006; Getafe, 2010), the 5th World Urban Forum of UN HABITAT (Rio de Janeiro, 2010), the 4th World Forum on Human Rights in Nantes (2010) and the 3rd UCLG World Congress (Mexico City, 2010). Research centers such as the Institute of Human Rights of Catalonia (IDHC) and the Social Studies Centre (CES) of Coimbra University have also been involved in this process from the very beginning.

The added value of the Global Charter-Agenda for Human Rights in the city is that each human right featured in the document is accompanied by an action plan that serves as reference for concrete steps to undertake by local governments. Signatory cities are invited to set up a local agenda with deadlines and indicators in order to assess their efficiency in implementing these rights. The Charter-Agenda will come into effect in each city after a consultation and participation process allowing residents to discuss it and adapt it both to local reality and to the national legal framework; and upon acceptance by a qualified majority of the municipal assembly. The result of this process will be the adoption of a Local Charter-Agenda in each signatory municipality.

The World Council of UCLG held in Florence in December 2011 formally adopted the Global Charter-Agenda for Human Rights in the city and invited all UCLG members to sign it. In the current situation of economic crisis and a possible reduction in rights, the Charter-Agenda is a tool for local governments to build more inclusive, democratic and solidarity-based societies in dialogue with urban dwellers.

== Inclusive Cities Observatory ==
The Observatory is a space for analysis and reflection on local social inclusion policies. It contains over sixty case studies on innovative policies for community development, access to basic services, gender equality, environmental protection and the eradication of poverty, among others.

The initiative has been developed with the scientific support of Prof. Yves Cabannes from the University College of London and a team of researchers from the Centre for Social Studies (CES) at the University of Coimbra, which has worked under the supervision of Prof. Boaventura de Sousa Santos.

Through this Observatory, the committee has identified and researched successful experiences that might inspire other cities to design and implement their own social inclusion policies.

=== Study on participatory democracy and social inclusion ===
The policies included in the Inclusive Cities Observatory have been the basis for the production of a study on the impact of citizen participation on social inclusion policies. This study has been produced by the IGOP (Institute of Government and Public Policy) of the Autonomous University of Barcelona (Spain).

=== For a World of Inclusive Cities ===
The publication presented contained the policy paper on local social inclusion promoted by the Committee on Social Inclusion, Participative Democracy and Human Rights of United Cities and Local Governments (UCLG). The paper presents the policy guidelines that cities are recommended to follow when designing and developing public policies for social inclusion. Along the same lines, its objective is to help the position of UCLG on this matter and direct its discourse toward other international agencies and organizations.

The document was approved by the UCLG World Council, which took place between 27 and 30 November 2008 in Istanbul. It draws on the findings of the "1st International Seminar on Innovative Local Policies for Social Inclusion", held in Barcelona on 27 and 28 September 2007, as well as the political discussions that took place within UCLG, through its regional sections and working committees.

The "1st International Seminar on Innovative Local Policies for Social Inclusion" was organized by Barcelona City Council and the Committee on Social Inclusion, with the support of the Catalan Government and the scientific advice of the DPU (Development Planning Unit), University College London. The seminar was attended by representatives of Eldoret (Kenya), Rosario (Argentina), Diyarbakir (Turkey), London (United Kingdom), Belo Horizonte and Porto Alegre (Brazil), Palmela (Portugal), Tacoma (United States), Cotacachi (Ecuador), Barcelona (Spain), Saint-Denis (France) and Bandung (Indonesia). Representatives of these 12 cities, all from very different realities, reported on their various policies of inclusion, while faced with the task of reflecting and deliberating together on three topics: (i) ensuring social justice and rights; (ii) citizen participation and generation of social networks; (iii) planning and sustainability policies.

The Committee on Social Inclusion, Participative Democracy and Human Rights of UCLG is grateful for the contributions made to the draft paper by the Centre for Social Studies at the University of Coimbra, the European Observatory Cities and Towns for All; the cities of Cordoba, Barcelona, Terrassa (Spain), Ecatepec de Morelos (México), Guarulhos (Brazil), Villa El Salvador (Peru), Nanterre, Saint-Denis, Plaine Commune (France), Junín (Argentina), Cotacachi (Ecuador) and Eldoret (Kenya); Malaga Provincial Council (Spain) and the province of Milan (Italy); the Andalusia cooperation fund FAMSI (Spain), the Forum of Local Authorities (FAL) and the Forum of Peripheral Local Authorities (FALP); the UCLG committees on Peripheral Cities, City Diplomacy, Urban Mobility and Urban Strategic Planning; and UCLG World Secretariat.
