= Todos (..) los nombres =

Spanish Civil War memory site

Todos (..) los nombres_
- Website type: Digital library
- Headquarters: Seville, Andalucia, Spain
- Owners: Promotoras Asociación Andaluza Memoria Histórica y Justicia (AMHyJA); Confederación General del Trabajo de Andalucía
- Website: www.todoslosnombres.org
- Launched: 5 October 2005; 20 years ago
- Current status: Active

Todos (..) los nombres is a publicly and privately funded historical memory site dedicated to documenting all those who disappeared, either through death, imprisonment or exile, from Andalusia, Extremadura and North Africa on the Republican side of the Spanish Civil War.

The 95,000 names listed are those of some suspected 140,000 to 150,000 victims. Most are men, with women compromising only around 5,000 of those listed on the site. This is a result of women, as victims, not being recognized by either the Franco regime or later researchers until very recently. A similar situation exists with homosexuals being under-represented by the project, with Todos (..) los nombres_ working to address the gap in both.

The information on the site comes from other sources, including government created rolls of people who were used as forced labors, and roles of people at concentration camps, prisons, and colonies.

== Funding ==
Asociación Andaluza Memoria Histórica y Justicia (AMHyJA) and Confederación General del Trabajo de Andalucía (CGT.A) signed a collaboration agreement, along with a sponsorship agreement with Patrocinio de la Consejería de Justicia y AA.PP. de la Junta de Andalucía and a collaboration agreement Fundación El Monte and the Universidad Pablo de Olavide on 3 October 2005.

The agreement ended on 3 October 2007, but was extended for six months. Sponsorship changed in the period between 1 August 2008 to 31 July 2009 to the Ministerio de la Presidencia del Gobierno de España. This agreement was renewed for the same periods in 2010-2011 and 2011–2012, finally terminating on 30 October 2012. A sponsorship agreement, initially through a grant, was signed with Administración Local y Relaciones Institucionales de la Junta de Andalucía on 9 September 2012. This arrangement ended on 19 September 2013.

Dirección General de Memoria Democrática gave a grant to the site that started on 16 December 2013 that ended in December 2014. For 2015, funding for the site came exclusively through Recuperando la Memoria de la Historia Social de Andalucía (RMHSA de CGT.A).

Consejería de Cultura de la Junta de Andalucía budgeted specific grant money for the site with the approval of the Consejería de Presidencia. A similar arrangement was done for 2017.

Cecilio Gordillo was the coordinator of the project in 2019, with the site listing the names of 96,762 people that year. The election of Vox in 2019 in Andalucia brought a lot of uncertainty to the project because Vox supports a positive narrative about the history of the Franco regime. Gordillo hoped that Fernando Martínez and the government of Pedro Sánchez would assist in making sure their project, and the memories of all the disappeared, would be protected as a result of the government change in Andalusia.

== Staff ==
Cecilio Gordillo was the coordinator of the project in 2019. José Luis Gutiérrez Molina served as the scientific director in 2019.

== Historical memory ==
Todos (..) los nombres_ plays an important role in maintaining historical memory in Andalusia. It allows relatives of those who were victims of the Franco government to read and contribute biographies about victims, and access historical documents related to disappearances of victims.

A round table about the site was held as part of a broader colloquium on historical memory in Andalusia in February 2019.

== Size ==
Names are searchable by first surname and second surname. The 95,000 names in it as of August 2018 includes victims from Andalusia, Extremadura and North Africa. Of the names listed, around 5,000 are women and 91,000 are men. The site grows as family and project collaborators add to them. People included were killed because of reprisals, while in prison, because they were given death sentences by war councils, and because of purges of specific professions. It also includes names of exiles, those who were stripped of their property by the regime and those who were used as forced labor. Beyond the 95,000 names, the site had around 790 microbiographies and 1,300 documents that are freely accessible. It also has 209 downloadable books. Cecilio Gordillo estimated in July 2018 that the listings could grow to 140,000 or 150,000 before it is complete.

The site listed the names of 96,762 disappeared people in 2019.

== Sources ==
Todos (..) los nombres_ relies on other sources to document who disappeared and write biographies of victims. One of the most important sources of data has been lists who people who were used as forced labors, and roles of people at concentration camps, prisons, and colonies. These were some of the first sources they sought to add to their database.

== Coverage ==
=== Women ===
There were 5,000 women included in August 2018. The reason so few women were included is that until recently, many women who disappeared were not considered victims. Only recently, with people doing more research into those who disappeared during the Civil War period, has there been recognition that there has been a double gender repression.

People researching female victims for the site have discovered that many women had their heads shaved as punishment, but their names were not listed on roles of those punished by Franco's forces.

=== Homosexuals ===
Another group under-represented by todos (..) los nombres is homosexuals. While the LGBT community is much more visible in modern Spain, much is unknown about this group that was specifically targeted by Franco's forces. Homosexual sexual victims lack names and relationships to others, making documenting and visualizing their plight harder.
