= Yves Cabannes =

French urban planner, scholar, and activist

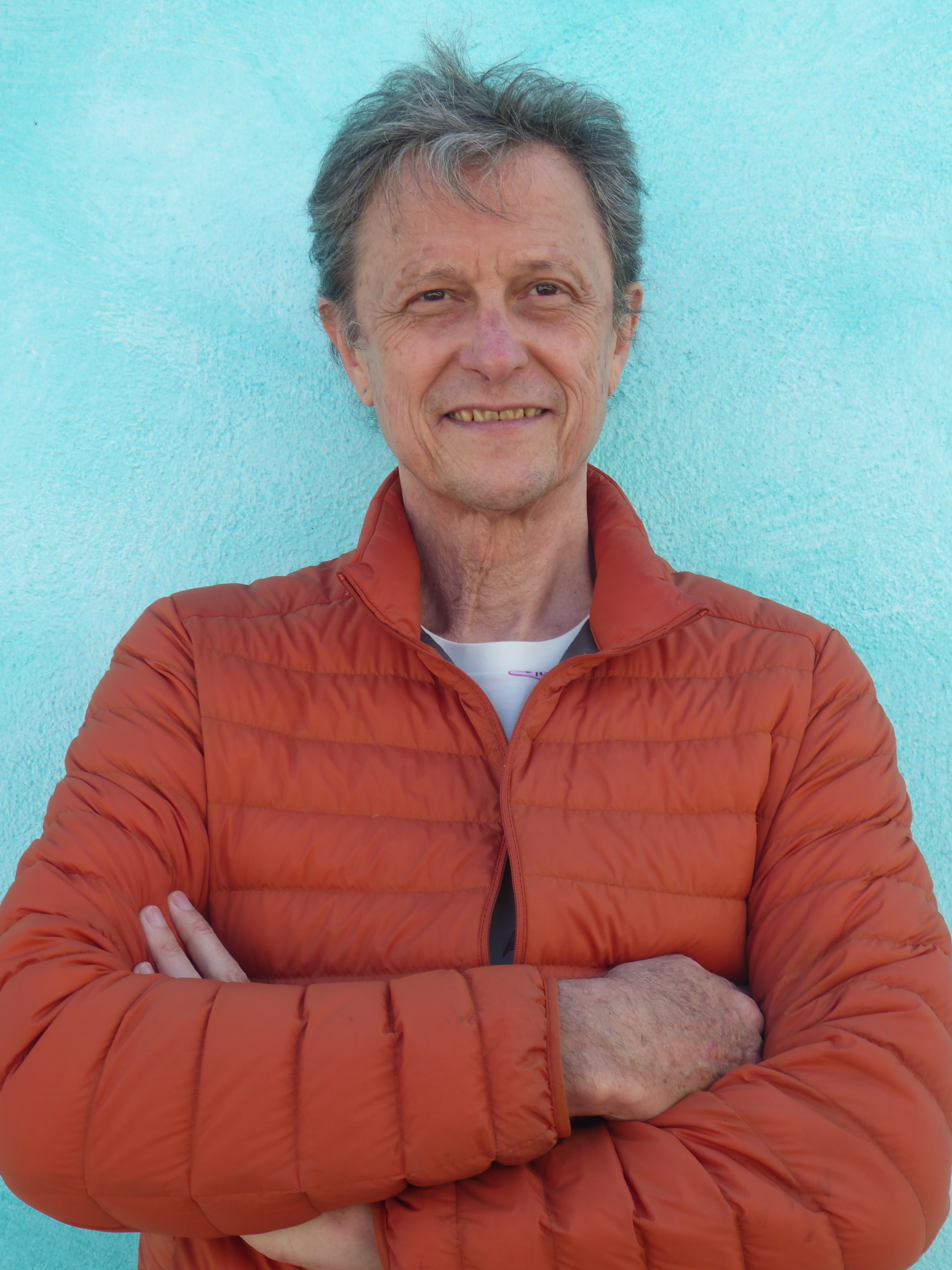
- Born: 25 February 1952; Arengosse, France
- Died: 12 January 2025 (aged 72); Lisbon, Portugal
- Education: IEDES

Yves Cabannes (25 February 1952 – 12 January 2025), was a French urban planner, scholar, and activist, who did extensive work in participatory democracy, urban agriculture, and housing rights.

== Biography ==
Yves Cabannes was born in Arengosse and grew up in Aire-sur-l'Adour.

He lived and worked in several countries, such as Mexico (1978–1980), Brazil (1990–1996), Ecuador (1997–2003), United States (2004–2006), United Kingdom (2006–2012) and Portugal (2013–2025). He died in Lisbon.

== Career ==
In 1977, Yves Cabannes obtained his PhD at IEDES, with a thesis on technological pluralism.

Yves Cabannes taught urbanism as a Lecturer in Urban Planning at the Harvard Graduate School of Design from 2004 to 2006. He was subsequently Chair of Development Planning at the Bartlett Development Planning Unit of University College London, where he led the Development Planning programme from 2006 to 2015. In recognition of his distinguished academic career and contributions to the field, he was later named Professor Emeritus. Over the course of his career, he also served as a visiting professor at numerous international institutions, such as the International University of Andalucía, the Pablo de Olavide University, the Université Catholique de Louvain, the Federal University of Rio de Janeiro, the Universidade Estadual do Ceará, the National Autonomous University of Mexico, and the National University of Singapore.

Yves Cabannes was an urban planner and activist specializing in urban and municipal governance. He was a member of the Groupe de Recherches et d'Echanges Technologiques from 1980 to 1995. He was also a member of the Advisor Group on Forced Evictions of the United Nations Human Settlements Programme from 2004 to 2010.

At the end of the 1980s, Yves Cabannes led a project with the Fortaleza City Council and poor residents on the outskirts of the city, who were organised within homeless movements. Mutirão 50 was the first mutual aid construction project for a micro-urbanisation comprising fifty homes, a building materials production unit, and subsequently a nursery, shops, and a square. The aim of this project, “Comunidades”, beyond the construction of more than a thousand homes, financed through a solidarity-based loan system and based on the creation of local jobs, was to establish a genuine public policy for the production and improvement of housing in collaboration with residents and social organisations. The project gained international recognition and won numerous awards, including the Tokyo Award for Excellence in Improving the Living Environment, presented at the United Nations Conference on Human Settlements (Habitat II).

== Selected Publications ==
- Cabannes, Yves (April 1997). "From community development to housing finance: from Mutiroesto Casa Melhorin Fortaleza, Brazil". Environment and Urbanization. 9 (1): 31–58. doi:10.1177/095624789700900106.
- Anzorena, Jorge; Bolnick, Joel; Boonyabancha, Somsook; Cabannes, Yves; Hardoy, Ana; Levy, Caren; Mitlin, Diana; Saborido, Marisol; Satterthwaite, David; Stein, Alfredo (April 1998). "Reducing urban poverty; some lessons from experience". Environment and Urbanization. 10 (1): 167–186. doi:10.1177/095624789801000106.
- Cabannes, Yves (April 2004). "Participatory budgeting: a significant contribution to participatory democracy". Environment and Urbanization. 16 (1): 27–46. doi:10.1177/095624780401600104.
- Cabannes, Yves (October 2012). "Financing urban agriculture". Environment and Urbanization. 24 (2): 665–683. doi:10.1177/0956247812456126.
- Cabannes, Yves (June 2013). "Urban movements and NGOs". City. 17 (4): 560–566. doi:10.1080/13604813.2013.795328.
