= Daniel Suero Alonso =

Spanish businessman

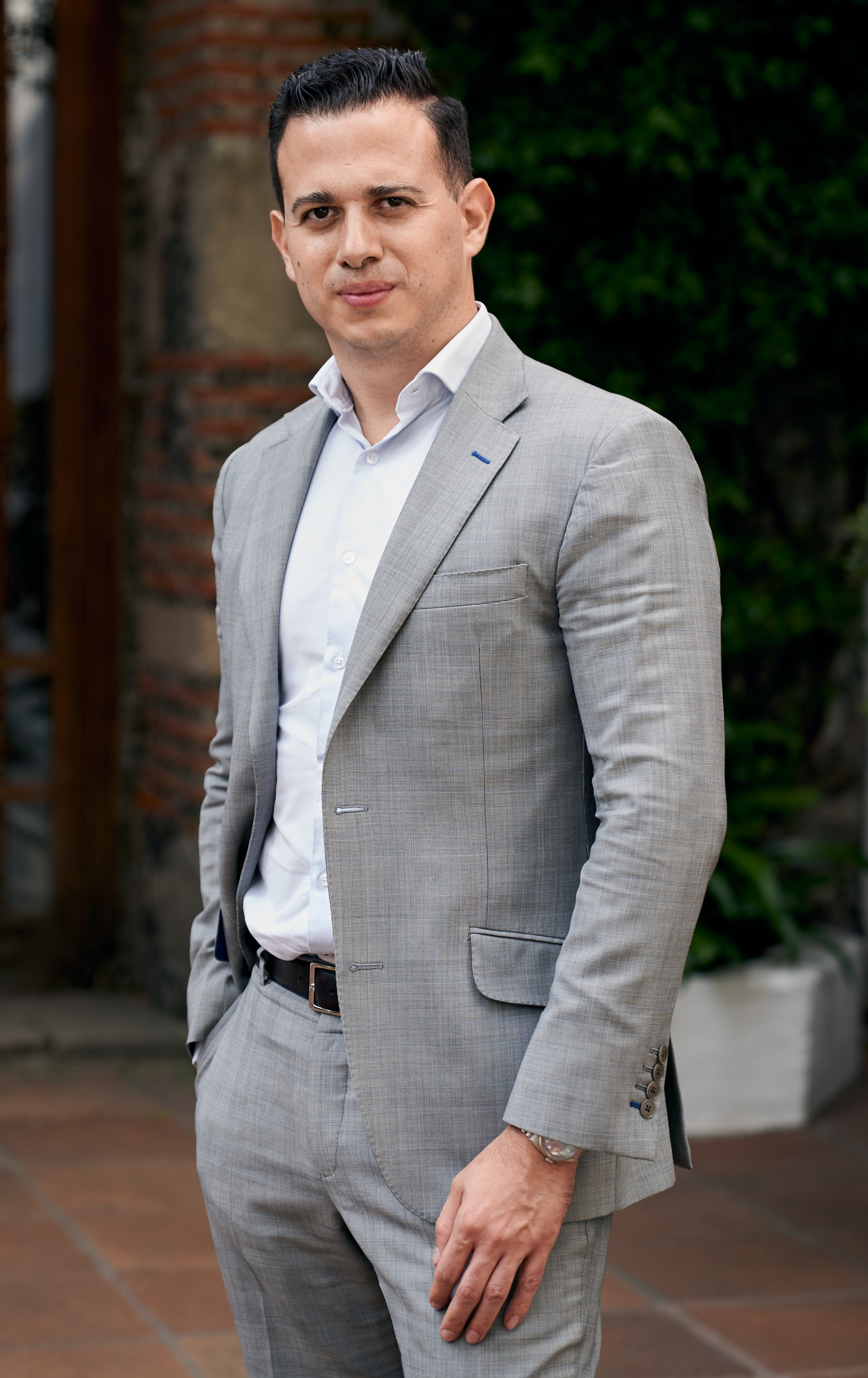
- Born: May 30, 1988 (age 38); Huelva, Andalusia, Spain
- Education: Pablo de Olavide University; Frankfurt School of Finance & Management
- Occupations: Angel investor, financial advisor, businessperson, president, and CEO at Sunday Marketplace, President and CEO at SafeBrok
- Years active: 2009 - Present

Daniel Suero Alonso (born May 30, 1988, in Huelva, Andalusia, Spain) is a Spanish businessman, financial advisor, angel investor, and writer. He founded Nuevo Sol, a company that offered advisory services for energy savings through thermal and photovoltaic solar panels and co-founded LEQ (Light Environment Quality), a company that was dedicated to the import of energy efficiency materials with operations in Spain, Germany, and China. As at January 2025, he is the president and CEO of Sunday Marketplace, a credit intermediation company. As of 2026, he is also the president and CEO of SafeBrok, a insurance and financial company and wealth management firm.

== Early life and education ==
He is the only son of Enrique Suero, a mathematics professor and Maria del Carmen Alonso Pizarro, a psychiatrist.

He studied at Pablo Olavide University in Seville. During his university education, he attended the Frankfurt School of Finance & Management in Germany.

Alonso received bachelor's degree in business administration from Pablo Olavide University. In 2009-2010 he received a Master in Business Administration with special mention in finance there. During the same period, he received a master in technical analysis, portfolio and day trading in Escuela de Negocios de Madrid with specific knowledge of financial markets and technical analysis.

In 2012–2013, Alonso graduated from the Frankfurt School of Finance and Management, becoming an expert in banking and finance.

In 2011–2015, he received a degree in finance and accounting in Pablo de Olavide University. After that, he studied fintech innovation in Harvard University in 2019.

== Career ==
After completing his studies, he worked as a private banker at Banco Mediolanum in Seville. In January 2013, Alonso co-founded Nuevo Sol, a company that integrated energy-saving with financial products such as savings or leasing. He was the CEO of Nuevo Sol until June 2015.

In January 2013, he also co-founded and became CFO of LEQ (Light Environment Quality) company with operations in Spain, Germany and China.

From December 2013 to January 2016 Alonso was a trader in London. In early 2018 he co-founded Sunday platform.

In 2014, he published his first book, ¿Cómo invertir tu dinero? ("How to invest your own money?")

In 2026, Suero Alonso published his second book, "El manual del asesor digital" (The Digital Advisor's Manual), which explores the impact of digitalization and artificial intelligence on the financial advisory sector. Around the same period, he assumed the role of president and CEO of SafeBrok, expanding the company's operations across Europe and Mexico.
