= Human Rights City =

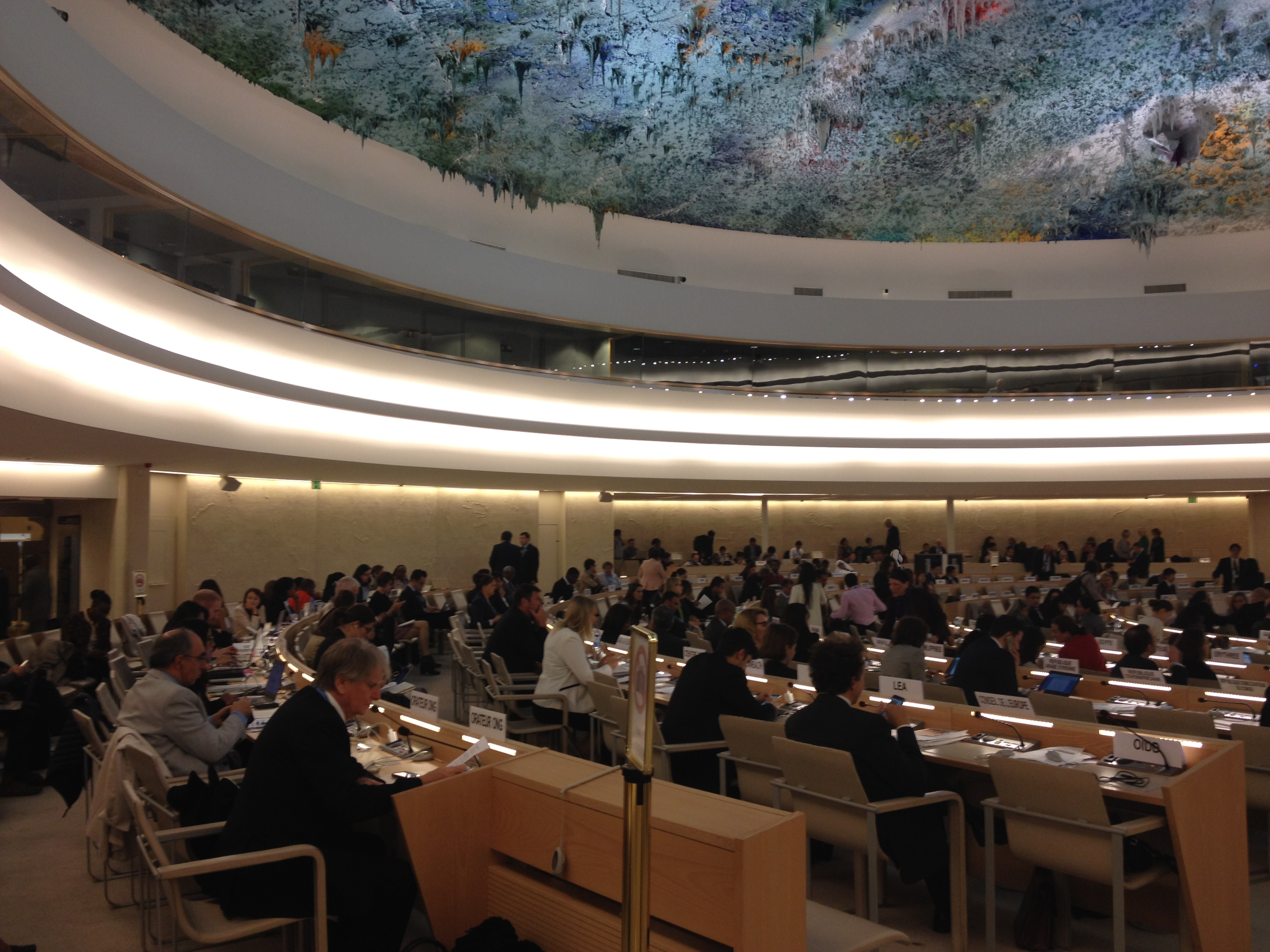
In 2015, the Human Rights Council adopted the A/HRC/30/49 Report "Role of local governments in the promotion and the protection of Human Rights". In the picture, Patrick Braouezec addresses the Council as co-chair of the UCLG Committee on Social Inclusion, Participatory Democracy and Human Rights

A Human Rights City is a municipality that engages with human rights. There are other definitions of human rights city available which are more specific and look at the human rights city from a particular angle. One says that a Human Rights City is a municipality that refers explicitly to the Universal Declaration of Human Rights and other international human rights standards and/or law in their policies, statements, and programs. Another definition states that a Human Rights City is 'a city which is organised around norms and principles of human rights'. This sociological definition emphasises the Human Rights City as a process to which to a varying degree a variety of agents contribute: from activists, experts and academics to international organisations, state governments, and local authorities and officials. Also, this definition does not qualify human rights as international, based on the fact that cities sometimes articulate human rights in their own charters in ways that have no formal or immediate recognition in international law, and may anticipate their appropriation by international bodies and incorporation into international law. The author claims that this definition captures better the different ways in which cities engage with human rights and participate in their co-production, not simply as receivers but also agents of human rights.

Analysts have observed growing numbers of such cities since 2000. Human Rights Cities do not always identify themselves as such but they are often called Human Rights Cities based on the fact that they engage with human rights. Broadly speaking, Human Rights Cities emerged in the late 1990s from the global human rights movement as well as the municipal movement. They reflect efforts of both activist groups and local government officials to improve respect for human rights principles at the local or community level. Because of their focus on local contexts, Human Rights Cities tend to emphasize economic, social, and cultural rights as they affect the lives of residents of cities and other communities and their ability to enjoy civil and political human rights. The human rights city concept is also intertwined with other innovations in human rights practice arisen at the local level, such as the Right to the City.

Human rights advocates describe a Human Rights City as “One whose residents and local authorities, through learning about the relevance of human rights to their daily lives (guided by a steering committee), join in ongoing learning, discussions, systematic analysis and critical thinking at the community level, to pursue a creative exchange of ideas and the joint planning of actions to realize their economic, social, political, civil and cultural human rights.” Human rights cities were defined at the 2011 World Human Rights Cities Forum of Gwangju (South Korea) as "both a local community and a socio-political process in a local context where human rights play a key role as fundamental values and guiding principles." The European Charter for the Safeguarding of Human Rights in the City and the Global Charter-Agenda for Human Rights in the City also provided a relevant framework for various practices led different cities across the world.

== History of the Human Rights Cities movement ==
The Human Rights City initiative is the result of long-standing efforts of popular groups to defend and promote human rights, and thus represents an aspect of global human rights struggles. It can also be seen as a consequence of increasing levels of decentralization and local autonomy across the world, which led to increasing levels of awareness and political initiative among local governments.

=== Origins: From the Right to the City to the People's Movement for Human Rights Learning ===
Contemporary human rights city initiatives grow directly from earlier organizing around rights claims in urban settings. The widespread nature of urban problems affecting people's everyday lives and survival have generated similar types of responses in places around the world, helping account for the simultaneous emergence and consolidation of popular claims to the "right to the city". According to David Harvey, “to invoke rights to the city means ‘to claim some kind of shaping power over the processes of urbanization, over the ways in which our cities are made and remade and to do so in a fundamental and radical way’."

Ideas inspiring this movement first emerged in the 1970s, with many influenced by Henri Lefebvre's 1968 book, Le Droit à la ville. The movement has expanded and gained momentum around the world since the mid-1990s. The proliferation of financial crises, urban austerity, and environmental damage has contributed to the rise of a growing number of cities around the world that are referring more explicitly to international human rights in their policies, statements, and programs.

The formally named “Human Rights Cities” initiative was launched by the People's Movement for Human Rights Learning (PDHRE), which was formerly known as People's Decade for Human Rights Education, in the wake of the 1993 World Conference on Human Rights in Vienna, Austria. The initiative aims to mobilize people in communities to “pursue a community-wide dialogue and to launch actions to improve the life and security of women, men and children based on human rights norms and standards.” This approach is different from the traditional way that human rights are enforced and applied because of its emphasis on popular education, engagement, and culture as a necessary complement to government enforcement.

Human Rights Cities have grown in part because of the enhanced efforts by international agencies like UN Habitat to connect international legal regimes with municipal programs. As a result of globalized economic development processes, cities around the world are facing a similar host of urban problems, including a lack of affordable housing, traffic congestion and insufficient public services. Cities have looked to international forums like the UN Conferences on Human Settlements and the World Associations of Cities and Local Authorities to help address these problems. Shulamith Koenig, founder of the People's Movement for Human Rights Learning (PDHRE), worked closely with human rights organizers in some of the first formally designated human rights cities, including Rosario Argentina, which became the first Human Rights City in the world in 1997 and the first U.S.-based Human Rights City of Washington, D.C.

=== Human Rights Cities International Consolidation ===
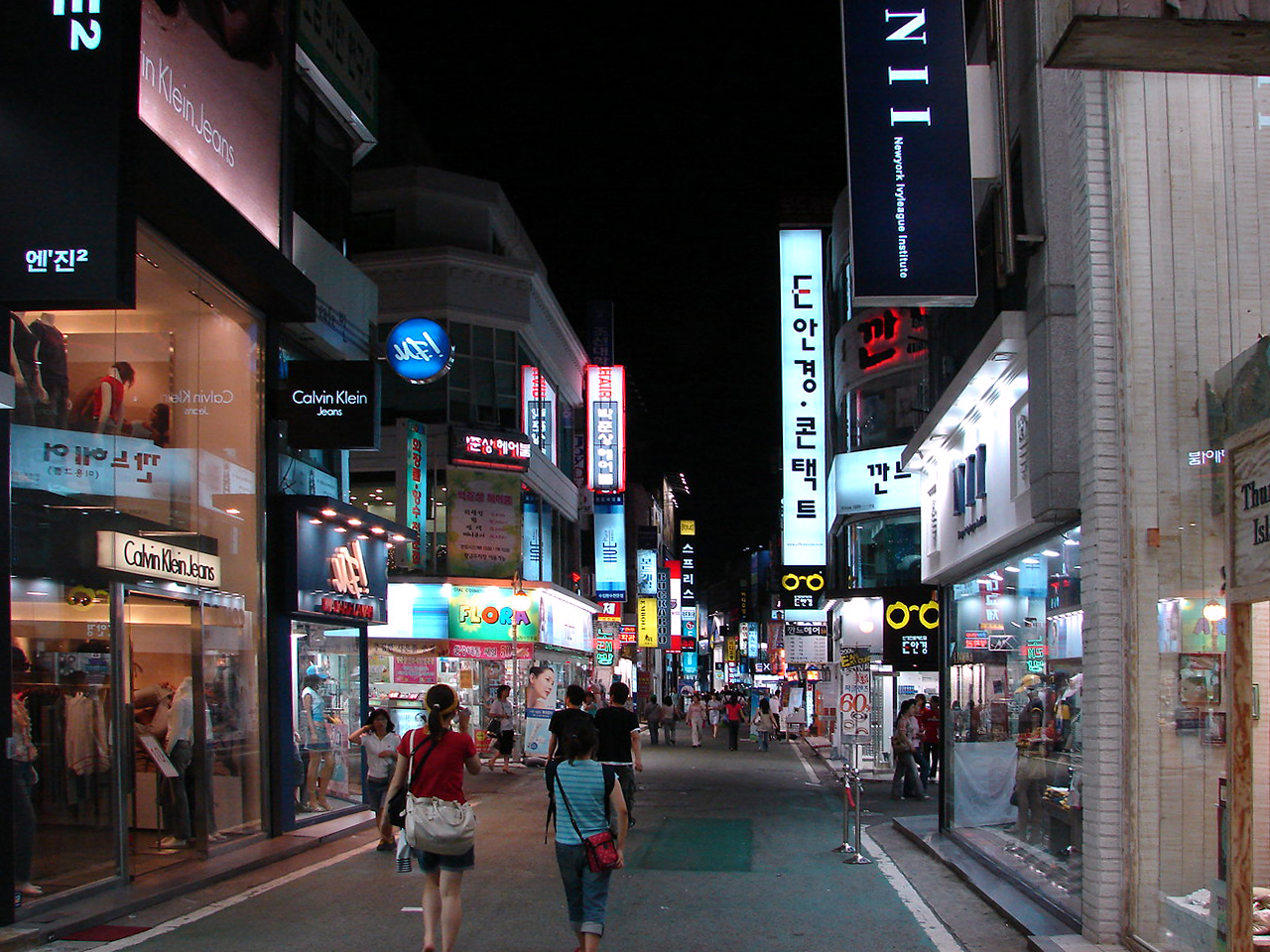
The city of Gwangju has been a pioneer in the implementation of the human rights cities framework in South Korean and Asia, and has co-organized since 2011 the World Human Rights Cities Forum.

1998 would suppose a breakthrough for the human rights movement both in terms of institutional consolidation as well as global outreach.

At the European level, the Barcelona Conference Cities for Human Rights gathered more than 400 local authorities uniting their voices and calling for stronger political acknowledgment as key actors in safeguarding human rights. This process would culminate 2 years later in the French city of Saint Denis by the adoption of the European Charter for the Safeguarding of Human Rights in the City (2000).

By the same time, the movement of human rights cities was also taking ground in Asia, as regional civil society organizations were about to launch the Asia Human Rights Charter (Gwangju, 1998). Both charters would highlight the increasing role of local actors in promoting human rights as a way to reinforce local democracy and the place of human rights in the city in an increasingly urbanized world.

After the establishment of Rosario as the first Human Rights City back in 1997, other local authorities in South America effectively embraced the human rights-based approach by placing a special emphasis on its link with the notion of right to the city. In 2001, the City Statue of Brazil offered a renewed framework for promoting human rights and the social function of the city at a national scale. Mexico City was also among the pioneers in the development of the human rights cities notion: in the last decade, it has promoted the Mexico City Charter for the Right to the City, created mechanisms to monitor human rights at the local level and adopted a new constitution specifically based on the human rights approach. The city of Bogotá was also at the forefront in the implementation of the human rights approach, with the implementation of the Bogotá Humana policy (2013-2016) which took a specific emphasis on the rights of homeless people, women and elderly population.

Throughout the last years, several examples around the world show a deepening on the concept and implications of human rights cities. In South Korea, Gwangju pioneered the establishment of a human rights municipal system (2009) that was quickly followed by cities such as Seoul (2012) and Busan. Gwangju has also been the main organizer of a World Human Rights Cities Forum that has gathered hundreds of human rights cities on a yearly basis. All around Europe, cities such as Barcelona, Madrid, Graz or Utrecht have established mechanisms to guarantee human rights and monitor their responsibilities under international human rights standards. Particular examples in this regard can be found in local government measures such as Barcelona's “City of Rights” programme (2016) or Madrid's “Strategic Plan for Human Rights Cities” (2017).

=== Human Rights Cities in North America ===
In North America, Montreal was a regional pioneer with the establishment of its local Montreal Charter of Rights and Responsibilities (2006). San Francisco has implemented policy translates and implements locally the rights of women as defined in the UN Convention on the Elimination of All Forms of Discrimination against Women since 1998. Human rights organizers in United States have nonetheless faced particular challenges due to the role of the U.S. in the world and to the U.S. failure to ratify most major international human rights treaties. However, in the 2000s, more U.S.-based activists have been working to raise international awareness of U.S. human rights violations, including racial discrimination in the criminal justice system, economic human rights violations, and the rights of children. In 2014 residents of Detroit who were losing access to clean water brought their case to the United Nations, which sent a Special Rapporteur to the city and issued a statement condemning practices that inhibited residents’ right to water. This issue and others have encouraged more U.S. cities, including Baltimore Maryland, Mountain View California, Columbia South Carolina, to consider the human rights city model.

Atlanta's Human Rights City Initiatives

In Atlanta, Georgia local activists and organizations have called for the city to officially designate itself as a "Human Rights City" as part of the international human rights cities movement. In April 2019, the National Human Rights Cities Alliance held a convening in Atlanta focused on economic justice, reproductive rights, voting rights, and issues around human migration and mobility. Over 50 attendees from Atlanta and other parts of the country discussed strategies for grassroots human rights organizing and how to become a human rights city in their various cities. The 2019 convening also launched the "Universal Periodic Review (UPR) Cities Project" which provides a toolkit to help cities engage residents in conversations about local human rights conditions. The initiative is under the guidance of the US National Human Rights Cities Alliance, an organization comprising a network of community leaders and advocates across the United States. This network offers assistance and resources to other municipalities aspiring to attain the status of Human Rights Cities and adhere to Rights City Principles. The project aims to contribute to a national "shadow report" for the United Nations Universal Periodic Review (UPR) process examining the United States' human rights record.

Local non-governmental organizations (NGOs) in Atlanta like the Southern Center for Human Rights have advocated for criminal justice reforms through legislative efforts as well as opposition to initiatives like the planned "Cop City” police training facility in Atlanta. Groups have also pushed for economic justice measures like the Home Defender Project to combat evictions during the pandemic. In December 2022, the Atlanta City Council passed a resolution declaring Atlanta a "Human Rights City" and urging policies to better protect human rights (22-R-4708). However, critics and activists argue the city still falls short in areas like economic inequality, discriminatory policing, and civil liberties protections for marginalized communities even after the official resolution. Moving forward, advocates and grassroots organizations like the Southern Center for Human Rights emphasize the importance of more community engagement, securing adequate funding for initiatives, pushing for greater police accountability and oversight, and prioritizing accessibility and resilience in urban planning and infrastructure.

Dayton Human Rights City Movement

Dayton, Ohio has grappled with the challenges of systematic social, economic, and criminal injustices. In the city of Dayton, the human rights movement called Uniting Dayton for Human Rights began in 2022. The Uniting Dayton for Human Rights movement founders are Mary Tyler the principal of Mary E. Tyler Consulting, LLC. and former executive director of the National Conference for Community & Justice Greater Dayton in collaboration with the Human Relations Council and the University of Dayton Human Rights Center. The goal of the movement was to become an official human rights city that supports human rights principles according to the Universal Declaration of Human Rights, by recognizing and safeguarding fundamental rights for all individuals living in Dayton.

== Cities and international law ==
All international human rights law is based in the Universal Declaration of Human Rights, which was adopted in 1948. This document outlines the inalienable and fundamental rights of humankind that are protected regardless of gender, race, class, sexual orientation, religion, or any other social, economic, or political factor. The articles in the UDHR are not legally binding, but they are recognized as part of customary international law, and they authorize the development of binding international treaties, which countries may choose to sign and ratify. International human rights treaties and monitoring processes, however, privileges national governments and limits the role of local officials, whose cooperation in the implementation of international law is critical. The day-to-day work of implementing human rights standards often rests on the shoulders of local and regional authorities. They too are bound by these agreements. Local and regional authorities are often directly responsible for services related to health care, education, housing, water supply, environment, policing and also, in many cases, taxation.

How cities implement human rights ideals varies from city to city. This allows for each city to develop a plan that is specific to its capacities, needs, problems, and concerns. Formally designated “Human Rights Cities” typically create a leadership body made up of community activists, residents, and public officials (or their appointees) working in partnership. Other cities may adopt human rights language and standards without officially adopting the name of Human Rights City. For instance, Barcelona is a leading human right city in Europe, and it created an Office of Non-Discrimination to implement the EU anti-racial discrimination policy within its borders as part of becoming a Human Rights City.

San Francisco is another such example, since its 1998 adoption of a city ordinance reflecting the principles of the Convention for the Elimination of all forms of Discrimination Against Women. The San Francisco example has helped shape work by activists organizing a “Cities for CEDAW” campaign to convince cities around the United States to implement the CEDAW convention despite the failure of the national government to ratify the treaty.

=== Human Rights Council on the "role of local governments in the promotion and the protection of human rights" ===
In the last years, the advance of the human rights cities movement has been assessed by several resolutions and statements of international organizations such as the Human Rights Council or the Council of Europe. A breakthrough in this regard was the adoption by the Human Rights Council of the Advisory Committee Report A/HRC/30/49 on the “Role of local governments in the promotion and the protection of human rights”. The report assessed local governments responsibilities in the light of international human rights law, but most importantly, emphasized the opportunities posed by the human rights cities movement in promoting and protecting human rights due to their close relation with the needs and aspirations of city inhabitants. The Report promoted local governments participation in the drafting of national human rights strategies, and called to secure the necessary powers and financial resources for local administration to be able to comply with their human rights responsibilities. It enshrined as best practices the initiatives of various local governments and promoted networking as a way to advance the human rights cities movement, including some examples and best practices such as the World Human Rights Cities Forum of Gwangju or the Global Charter-Agenda for Human Rights in the City.

Local authorities are close to citizens’ everyday needs and they deal with human right issues on an everyday basis. Therefore, there exists a clear and strong connection between human rights and local government. When performing their functions, local authorities take decisions relating in particular to education, housing, health, the environment, and law and order, which are directly connected with the implementation of human rights and which may enforce or weaken the possibilities of its inhabitants to enjoy their human rights. Furthermore, local government is always facing the risk of discriminatory practices against perceived outsiders, such as immigrants or ethnic minorities, to the local community.

— Final report of the Human Rights Council Advisory Committee, "Role of local government in the promotion and protection of human rights" (A/HRC/30/49), Human Rights Council (2015)

The 2015 Report has received an intense follow up by the Human Rights Council constituency and other international and local governments organizations working for the advance of the human rights cities movement. As the world representative of local and regional governments, the UCLG Committee on Social Inclusion, Participatory Democracy and Human Rights has for instance presented various statements to the Council and shared the Report's recommendations among its constituency. In 2016, the Human Rights Council adopted a resolution (A/HRC/RES/33/8) “Recognizing the role of local government in the promotion and protection of human rights” and that “given its proximity to people and being at the grass-roots level, one of the important functions of local government is to provide public services that address local needs and priorities related to the realization of human rights at the local level”. On 2017, the same Council organized an intersessional panel discussion on the Report and the most recent advances in its implementation.

== Local government international cooperation on human rights ==
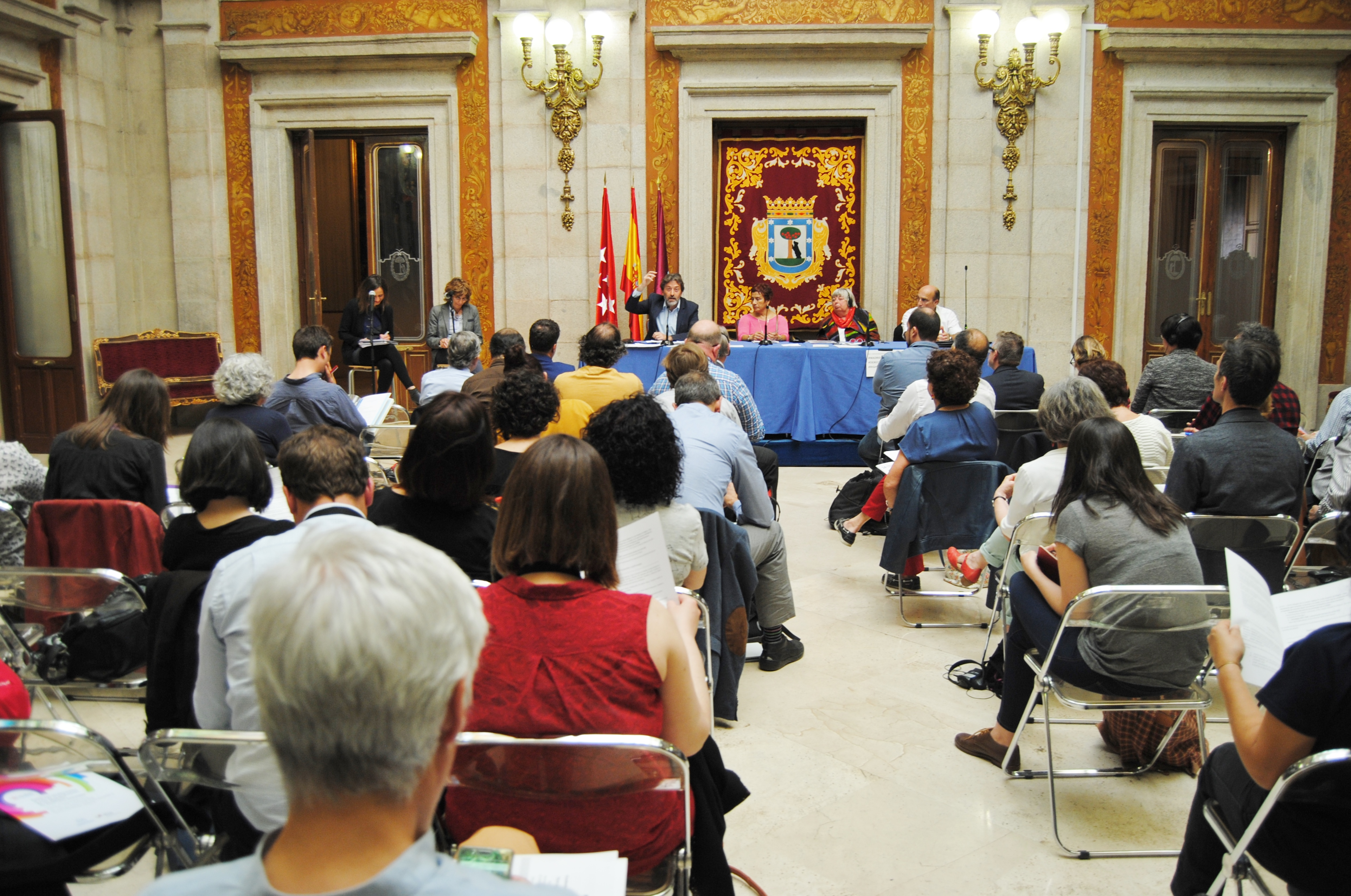
The city of Madrid held in 2017 an international meeting of cities for human rights and the right to the city

Work by international human rights activists and by policymakers in the United Nations has helped spread ideas about how city governments can improve human rights implementation. In 2004, UNESCO helped establish the International Coalition of Cities against Racism to help municipal leaders exchange ideas and improve policies to fight racism, discrimination, xenophobia and exclusion. The European Coalition of Cities against Racism (ECCAR) grew out of that effort, and it now has more than 104 municipalities in its membership and has adopted a ten-point action plan.

In 2005, the UCLG Committee on Social Inclusion, Participatory Democracy and Human Rights was created in the framework of the largest organization and world representative of local governments: United Cities and Local Governments. The Committee represents and facilitates the exchange between worldwide local authorities having a strong agenda on human rights (Mexico City and Gwangju were for instance two of its co-chairs in 2018). As relevant outcomes of more than 10 years of work for advancing the notion and recognition of human rights cities, the Committee has been in charge of the follow-up of the European Charter for the Safeguarding of Human Rights in the City and has created and promoted the Global Charter Agenda for Human Rights in the City. It has also carried out a strong political advocacy at a UN level for the recognition of local governments as key actors in the promotion and protection of human rights, and co-organized yearly a World Human Rights Cities Forum.

Another relevant example in regards to concrete partnerships for advancing the human rights cities agenda are the so-called “action-research centers”. In this case, a local research center is generally at the forefront of mobilizing local authorities for the implementation of human rights at the local level. Relevant examples in this regard can be found at a European and North American levels. One of the most advanced examples on how can a local research center scale up and become a global actor in the promotion of the human rights agenda is the Raoul Wallenberg Institute. Although being affiliated to Lund University since 1984, the Institute's outreach has nonetheless gone beyond its local or even national level, as it now carries out projects in different regions of the world.

== Current human rights cities ==
The following cities have been formally designated as Human Rights Cities:

=== Africa ===
- Walewale, Ghana
- Korogocho, Kenya
- Thies, Senegal
- Timbuktu, Mali
- Musha, Rwanda
- Mogale, South Africa

=== Asia ===
- Gwangju, South Korea (2003)
- Seoul, South Korea
- Bucuy Municipality, Philippines
- Nagpur, India
- Kaohsiung, Taiwan
- Wonosobo District, Indonesia
- Bojonegoro District, Indonesia
- Bandung, Indonesia (2015)

=== Europe ===
- Nuremberg, Germany (2001)
- Graz, Austria (2001)
- Barcelona, CA, Spain
- Madrid, Spain (2017)
- Terrassa, CA, Spain
- Bihac, Bosnia
- Vienna, Austria (2014)
- Utrecht, Netherlands (2015)
- York, UK (2017)
- Lund, Sweden (2018)

=== North America ===
- Atlanta, GA, United States (2022)
- Austin, TX, United States
- Boston, MA, United States (2011)
- Carrboro, NC, United States (2009)
- Chapel Hill, NC, United States (2009)
- Dallas County, TX, United States
- Dayton, Ohio, United States (2023)
- Edina, MN, United States (2016)
- Eugene, OR, United States (2011)
- Edmonton, AB, Canada (2003)
- Greenville, NC, United States
- Jackson, MS, United States (2014)
- Mountain View, CA, United States (2016)
- Pittsburgh, PA, United States (2011)
- Portage, MI, United States
- Port Townsend, WA, United States (2023)
- Richmond, CA, United States (2009)
- San Francisco, CA, United States
- Seattle, WA, United States (2012)
- Washington D.C., United States (2008)
- Winnipeg, MB, Canada (2003) The Canadian Museum for Human Rights opened in this city on September 19, 2014

=== South America ===
- Rosario, Argentina (1997)
- Montevideo, Uruguay
- Santa Cruz, Bolivia
- Porto Alegre, Brazil
- Temuco, Chile

== See also ==
- Municipal socialism
