= Marcelo Lopes =

Marcelo Lima may refer to:

- Marcelo Lopes (footballer, born 1975), Brazilian football defender
- Marcelo Lopes (footballer, born 1994), Portuguese football winger
- Marcelo Lopes de Souza, Brazilian professor of socio-spatial development and political ecology
