= Right to the City Alliance =

Social movement

The Right to the City Alliance (January 2007 – present) is a social movement that emerged as a response to the mass displacement of people because of gentrification.

== Right to the City ==
The right to the city is a concept coined by Henri Lefebvre in his 1968 book Le Droit à la ville. Lefebvre has an idea of space that encompasses perceived space, conceived space, and lived space. He believed that the everyday concrete environment we live hinges on our mental representations of the space as well as our social relations within that space. Thus, for him, city planning was not the singular placement of material space within a city, but the consequences of these material spaces in the urban life. Two central themes in Lefebvre's work is the idea of the city as an "oeuvre" (a collective artwork) and appropriation within a city. Lefebvre considered a city actively shaped by the people within it through participating in public life and appropriation of time and space in the city. By appropriation, Lefebvre meant that everyone should have the inalienable right to use any and all space within the city for his or her daily life. He believed that the appropriation of the space was more important than who owned the actual space, thus prioritizing use value over economic value. He believed there was a centrality to space, where inner cities should be the epicenter of all interaction and creativity.

Lefebvre's idea of the "right to the city" has been integrated into modern, urban movements as a plea for a new kind of urban politics and a critique on urban neoliberalism. The most common modern interpretation of his concept comes from David Harvey in his article "The right to the city," where he notes that the phrase 'right to the city' is an empty signifier that lacks meaning.

== Formation ==
RTTC arose when the Miami Workers Center, Strategic Actions for a Just Economy, and Tenants and Workers United convened a meeting in Los Angeles amongst 20 community organizations from 7 cities to start the alliance. Since then, RTTC has a national governance structure, a network of regional member organizations, and thematic working groups that engage with academic, professional, and community leaders. RTTC continues to follow their model of a more democratic form of democracy in their internal processes. They hold annual meetings with their steering committee, staff, and representatives to discuss the vision for RTTC where everyone has to reach a consensus through trust, reflection, and listening.

=== Homes for All ===
Homes for All (HFA) is a campaign focused on public housing, homelessness, and rentership in American cities. It has been criticized for failing to address the role of nonprofits in privatization of urban space.

== See also ==
- Urban politics in the United States
