= Reyes Romero =

Spanish politician (born 1967)

Reyes Romero MP
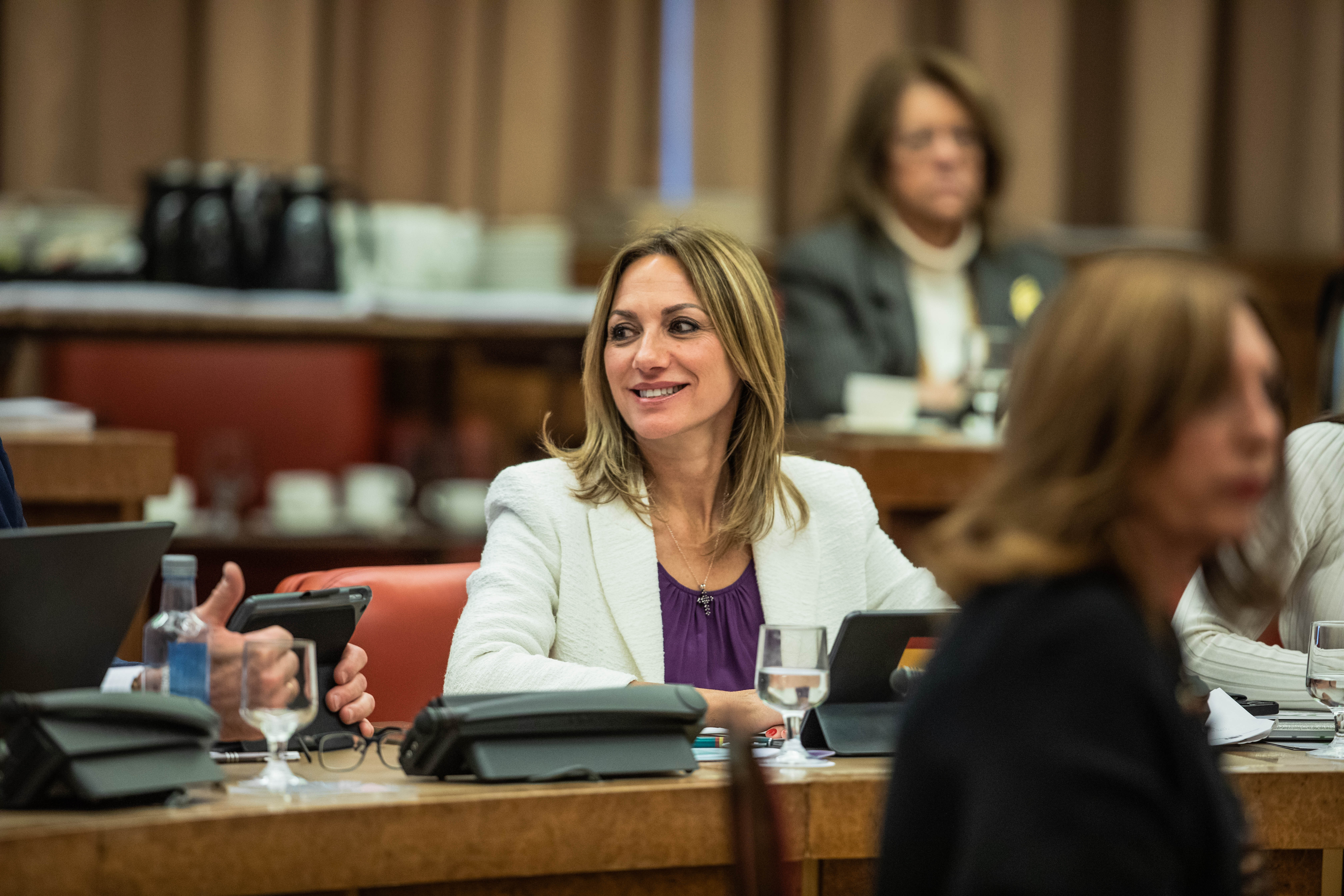

Member of the Congress of Deputies
- Incumbent
- Assumed office 21 May 2019
- Constituency: Sevilla

Personal details
- Born: María de los Reyes Romero Vilches; 30 December 1967 (age 58) Marchena, Kingdom of Spain
- Party: Vox
- Spouse: Macario Valpuesta
- Children: 4

María de los Reyes Romero Vilches (born December 30, 1967), known as just Reyes Romero, is a Spanish politician for the Vox party and a member of the Congress of Deputies since 2019.

Reyes Romero is a native of Marchena. She worked in the fashion and advertising industries before getting involved in politics. Reyes Romero has described herself as politically active since she was a teenager but was not involved in any political parties before Vox and was an original founding member of Vox alongside Santiago Abascal. She is currently the vice-president of Vox in the Seville region. She is married to fellow Vox politician Macario Valpuesta.

Reyes Romero was elected to the Congress of Deputies in the April 2019 Spanish general election for the Seville constituency, and again in the November election of that year.

Reyes Romero has also expressed opposition to modern feminist activism and described third-wave feminists as feminazis.
