= Macario Valpuesta =

Spanish jurist and politician

Macario Valpuesta Bermúdez (born 12 July 1959) is a Spanish jurist and politician of the Vox party. He served in the Parliament of Andalusia from 2020 to 2022, as the party's group leader.

== Biography ==
Born in Seville, Valpuesta has doctorates in Classics and Law, and is a professor of Roman Law at the Pablo de Olavide University in the city. He is married to Reyes Romero, a Vox member of the Congress of Deputies representing Seville.

Valpuesta described having left-wing sympathies in his youth during the Spanish transition to democracy, and wore the flag of Andalusia. He ran for Vox in the Senate of Spain in the Seville constituency in the April 2019 general election, finishing 11th in the four-seat constituency. In the following election in November, he came seventh.

In September 2020, Valpuesta replaced the resigned Francisco Serrano Castro in the Parliament of Andalusia, representing its Seville constituency. He became the leader of the party's parliamentary group. Despite this position, he was not selected as a candidate for the 2022 Andalusian regional election.

Valpuesta wrote in August 2019 that Blas Infante, the father of Andalusian nationalism, was a Freemason who created an "absurd" semi-Arab identity for the Andalusians, including their green and white flag; he nonetheless said that Infante was more moderate than his respective Basque and Catalan equivalents Sabino Arana and Enric Prat de la Riba and did not deserve to be assassinated. He also wrote that what he called the "homosexualist" movement deserves to be criticised according to the same freedom that allows for religion and ideology to be criticised.
