= Municipal socialism =

Type of socialism that uses local government to further socialist aims

Municipal socialism is a type of socialism that uses local government to further socialist aims. It is a form of municipalism in which its explicitly socialist aims are clearly stated. In some contexts the word "municipalism" was tainted with the concept of provincialism. However, when it was adopted by various socialist networks in the late nineteenth century, this approach to socialist transformation spread across Europe and North America. Following electoral success in a number of localities, by the early twentieth century discussion of municipal socialism took on a more practical character, as Edgard Milhaud, Professor of Political Economy at the University of Geneva. established Annales de la Régie Directe, an academic journal which set out to scientifically examine the initial steps towards transforming areas previously dominated by private enterprise into new forms of public service. This journal contributed to a growing network of municipal socialists in Europe and North America, in which three types of movements were united at a local level: trade unions particularly of municipally run public services such as gas, transport, sewage etc., consumer and industrial co-operatives, and other associations of consumers including tenants groups opposed to price and rent increases.

== History ==
There have been several historical and contemporary movements that aim to use local government to develop socialism.

=== In the United States ===
Municipal socialism has been used to describe public ownership of streetcar lines, waterworks, and other local utilities, as was favored by "Progressives" in the United States in the late 1890s/early 1900s. The term Sewer Socialism was also used to describe the pragmatic reformist policies of Emil Seidel, Daniel Hoan and Frank Zeidler, Milwaukee's three Socialist mayors in the 20th century.

During the early Twentieth Century, socialists in a number of municipalities across the United States were successful in bringing about progressive reforms in areas such as education, labor and housing conditions, public health, and child welfare.

A chapter on municipal socialism appears in Class in America: an Encyclopedia:

The heyday of municipal socialism is generally considered to have been from 1901 to 1917. [...] In 1911 there were seventy-three Cities with socialist mayors, and over 1,200 other socialist elected officials across the nation.

New York City mayor Zohran Mamdani, elected in 2025, has been described as a municipal socialist.

=== In the United Kingdom ===
The term municipal socialism has been used to describe the local government-led social reform developed in the United Kingdom. This includes the reforms initiated by Joseph Chamberlain as mayor of Birmingham between 1873 and 1875. These reforms included rendering gas and water supplies public services, controlled by the government, clearing slums and the introduction of a city park system. Chamberlain's approach was also described as "gas and water socialism". Chamberlain's reforms were influential on Beatrice Webb, one of the leaders of the Fabian movement.

Beatrice Webb's husband, Sidney Webb, wrote in Socialism in England, published in the 1890s:

It is not only in matters of sanitation that this 'Municipal Socialism' is progressing. Nearly half the consumers of the Kingdom already consume gas made by themselves as citizens collectively, in 168 different localities, as many as 14 local authorities obtained the power to borrow money to engage in the gas industry in a single year. Water supply is rapidly coming to be universally a matter of public provision, no fewer than 71 separate governing bodies obtaining loans for this purpose in the year 1885-86 alone. The prevailing tendency is for the municipalities to absorb also the tramway industry, 31 localities already owning their own lines, comprising a quarter of the mileage in the Kingdom.

The Fabians were influential in the London County Council and London School Board, as well as in some other local authorities, through the newly formed Labour Party. A more radical expression of the municipal socialist movement was Poplarism in Poplar, east London, led by George Lansbury.

It was during the late 19th Century that British socialism began to make headway in local government. In 1889 the Progressive Party composed of Fabians and British Liberals took control of London County Council at the first elections held there. This was the first council to have substantial socialist influence, and carried out a programme of municipalisation, while constructing some of the first social housing in England and increasing public spending on services such as the London Fire Brigade. In addition, fair wages contracts and minimum wage rates were introduced, the number of parks and public baths were increased, London's sewerage system was improved, roads were widened and paved, and the Blackwall Tunnel, linking the Isle of Dogs with Greenwich, was opened in 1897.

Throughout the decade or so following the end of the First World War, the Labour Party won control of many municipalities in local elections; enabling it to carry out important reforms on a local level in areas such as housing, social welfare, and working conditions.

During the Great Depression, councils that were led by the Labour Party made great efforts to protect unemployed people from the worst effects of the slump, and sought to ensure that the public assistance system for the needy was made as generous as possible. In Durham and Glamorgan, the Labour administrations paid more than the minimum while operating the means test in a more humane way. In Hackney, the London Labour Party secretary and London County Council leader Herbert Morrison carried out measures to deal with the effects of joblessness. In Nelson, the Labour council of the 1930s invested in services like education and child welfare. In Glasgow, Patrick Dollan's Glasgow corporation undertook a slum-clearance programme that resulted in the construction of some 200,000 homes between 1934 and 1939. In Barnsley, the school-leaving age was raised by six months in order to promote education and keep some 500 teenagers off the unemployment figure. In addition, priority was given to housing construction and slum clearances.

More recently, the term refers to attempts in the 1980s in British cities by left-wing figures in the British Labour Party to resist the curtailment of local government powers by Margaret Thatcher's right-wing Conservative central government during the rate-capping rebellion. This movement was also known as "local socialism" or the "new urban left". Examples of such local authorities included the Greater London Council under "Red" Ken Livingstone, Lambeth council under "Red" Ted Knight and Linda Bellos, Liverpool council under Derek Hatton and Sheffield council (sometimes referred to as "the People's Republic of South Yorkshire") under David Blunkett. These authorities were often derided as "loony left" by Conservative supporting tabloid newspapers.

Recently, some media outlets have identified a resurgence of municipal socialism in places like Preston. The New Statesman has also called the policies of the town "new municipalism" and "community wealth building" alongside that of municipal socialism. Both The Economist and New Statesman tie the projects to Jeremy Corbyn's leadership of the Labour Party.

=== In Germany ===
The Social Democratic Party of Germany, which was established in the late Nineteenth Century, gave particular attention to carrying out reforms at the local level, founding a tradition of community politics which intensified after 1945. The establishment of local labour exchanges and the introduction of unemployment benefits can be credited in part to the SPD. In 1913, the number of Social Democrats on municipal and district councils approached 13,000. As noted by Heinrich Potthoff and Susanne Miller:

Here, and in their work in the administration of industrial insurance, in community employment offices and courts of arbitration, lay one of the roots of the gradual penetration by the Social Democrats of the imperial German state.

As noted by another study

Especially in the larger cities the SPD was often able to win substantial representation on the city council and to play a major role in municipal politics, participating, for example, in the establishment of public works programmes, unemployment insurance schemes as well as housing and public health.

An example of the SPD’s municipal reformism was in Offenbach, where important measures were realized after they attained a legislative majority such as a nine-hour day standard for city employees, a requirement for contractors who performed city business to pay better wages, publicly managed markets for coal and fish, and educational reforms aimed at enhancing access for workers’ children to milk stations, school baths, and special speech therapy programs. In addition, the city-owned hospital was modernized, while capital improvements were made to the city’s municipal gas and electric utilities.

Social Democrats and liberals on a local level also worked together to effect social change, as one study has noted:

At a municipal level, liberal politicians, often working in uneasy alliance with SPD councilors, pursued projects, such as public housing, publicly regulated work exchanges, and various forms of municipal welfare and work relief, all aimed at improving the working and living conditions of the proletariat.

One study from 1908 commented on the indirect influence that German socialists had on municipal reform by that time:

Curiously enough, the most important results of the socialist movement are to be found in Germany. In France, Belgium, and Italy their electoral strength places them in possession of the municipal government, but the centralized powers prevent them from carrying out their policies. In Prussia the law does not permit them to control a municipality, but they can and do direct its policies. The electoral law provides that the non-propertied classes shall only elect one-third of the municipal council. In nearly every city the socialists elect the full third, and in many industrial cities their vote is larger than that of all other parties. The moral power which this electoral strength gives to the socialist minority enables it to exercise enormous pressure upon German municipal policy. The position of the socialists may be merely that of critics, but their activity in placing before the councils measures for the improvement of the conditions of the workers, the sanitary renovation of the poorer quarters, the building of model tenements, the municipalizing of public utilities, and countless other measures for municipal improvement, make them a source of perpetual irritation to the old parties. They drive the conservative majorities to more and more extreme measures, until Germany has now the most enlightened municipal policy in Europe. Twenty years ago her slums were notorious. There was hardly a great city which did not have conditions rivalling those still prevalent throughout Great Britain. To-day there is hardly a poor district in Germany that can justly be called a slum.

The SPD also played an active role in local politics during the Weimar era, with most large towns acquiring socialist administrations during this period. SPD municipal administrations were in the forefront of the development of social programmes. As remarked by Hedwig Wachenheim in 1926, under Social Democratic administration many of the country's larger cities began to become experimental "proletarian cooperatives." A system of youth and child welfare was set up by social democratic councils, while social housing was provided. The SPD insisted that the labor movement had the right to full participation in the administration of the new welfare agencies that were established, such as welfare committees and housing offices, and set up their own voluntary association to provide workers with a voice in the formulation and implementation of welfare policies on both local and national levels. Social Democrats on a local level also encouraged consumer and producer cooperatives while also striving to engage municipalities in economic activity by establishing companies owned and run by municipalities such as in electricity and power supply, water, and public transport. Altogether, a great deal was achieved in areas like training, education, health and welfare, although many of these accomplishments were undermined by the onset of the Great Depression. This led to socialist town councils laying off their own employees and an incident on May Day 1929 in Berlin when the social democratic police chief sent armed men against marchers “with catastrophic results,” as noted by one study.

Following the end of the Second World War, and during its long years in opposition, the SPD continued to introduce reforms on a local level, with SPD local governments active (for instance) in encouraging the post-war housing boom in West Germany, with some of the best results in housing construction during this period achieved by SPD-controlled Lander authorities such as West Berlin, Hamburg, and Bremen.

=== In Italy ===
From the late Nineteenth Century onwards, Italian socialists won control of several municipalities; a development helped by the passage of an electoral law in December 1888 which expanded the number of eligible voters. This provided socialists with the opportunity to implement progressive reforms on a local level throughout the country. Amongst the measures undertaken by socialist municipalities included the construction of bakeries to distribute pasta, flour and bread and the opening up of municipal pharmacies. The growth of socialist municipal government was such that by the end of 1920 26 out of 69 provinces and 2022 out of 8327 municipalities had socialist majorities.

The main accomplishments of Italian socialist municipalities were in the areas of municipal service provision, education, public works, social policy, and tax policy. Laws on public health, schooling and factory safety were also enforced by socialist municipalities; laws that had (according to one study) “been passed by the national government but were ignored by previous administrations.” In regards to tax reform, socialist municipalities engineered a shift from consumption to property taxation, while in terms of municipal services expansions were carried out in the provision of electricity, sewage and water. A number of socialist municipalities also experimented with direct democracy, such as in the case of Sesto Fiorentino, where the socialist-republican town council submitted a referendum on whether to build a municipal electricity facility, with most voters supporting the initiative. In addition, there were cases of Italian socialist municipalities providing shelter and food to strikers, while also seeing that their children were cared for.

According to one observer, Italian socialist municipalities took on the responsibility

of establishing employment protection services, public welfare, municipalization of transportation companies, public education, the fight against unproductive wealth, support for the disadvantaged, credit management (through control of local savings banks), food security for the population, and public housing policies.

=== In Australia ===
There have been several examples of municipal socialism in Australian history, a belief that was most popular in the state of Queensland. In the City of Townsville, the libertarian socialist Alderman Ned Lowry led a municipal socialist movement in the 1890s, which advocated for the "municipal ownership of gas, tram and other industries". Although Lowry died in 1897, the movement was picked up by the Townsville newspaper Democrat. In the neighbouring City of Maryborough, the municipal socialist movement advocated for the municipalisation of "water, lighting, transport, abbatoirs, markets, washhouses, and the conveyance of coffins to cemeteries [sic?]".

One of the most notable socialist municipalities in Australia in the early Twentieth Century was that of Broken Hill, which acquired a Labor dominated council following local elections in 1900, During its first six months in office, Labor implemented important reforms in areas like wage rates and working hours. The local Labor administration has been described by one study as “a beacon in Australasia” while standing out at the time as “the only institution of its kind…where representatives of Labour number two-thirds of its [council] members.” Broken Hill would remain a Labor stronghold for many years.

=== In France ===
During the late Nineteenth Century socialists came to power in over 100 municipalities in France, which gave them the chance to put their principles into practice. In the municipalities that one socialist party, the French Workers' Party, came to control, it devoted itself wholeheartedly (according to one study) “to providing libraries, soup kitchens, schools lunches, and old-age and sickness pensions-the whole range of policies and services associated with the welfare state.” In Paris, a minimum wage was fixed for those employed on public works while working hours for municipal employees were lowered, and in Roubaix children in communal schools were in part provided by free food and clothing. Measures were also taken by socialist municipalities to set up public hygiene offices with the responsibility of preventing epidemics, together with building public toilets and redeveloping neighbourhoods and council housing.

One journal from 1904 summarized the achievements of socialist municipalities in France as follows:

School lunches for workers’ children; shoes and clothes for poverty-stricken youth; seaside recuperation for sickly children; aid for working-class mothers and families in the form of nursery schools and day-care centres; free public baths; pensions for aged and indigent workers of both sexes; improvements in the condition of aged-homes; improved working regulations for municipal employees; subsidies for unions; legal aid; public kitchens distributing cheap and healthy meals in working-class quarters; refuges for the homeless; slum improvement; support for the families of active-duty reservists; elimination or reduction of consumption taxes; etc., etc. – such are the fruit of socialist entry into municipal government.

Socialists were also able to successfully pursue policies of social reform on a local level during the interwar period, with progressive initiatives carried out in areas such as public health, urban planning and social protection.

=== In the Netherlands ===
During the early Twentieth Century, Dutch socialists (including members of the SDAP) gradually increased their municipal representation, enabling them to influence important initiatives such as improvements and expansions in hospitals and maternity care, new schools and public housing, reduced rents, higher wages for teachers, the renovation of old neighborhoods, the establishment of sewage systems, playgrounds, swimming pools, laundromats, local medical and dental services, and vocational training and employment agencies for jobless persons, better facilities in areas like clothing, school meals, and childcare, improved provisions for workhouse inmates, the modernization of poor relief, and improved standards, appointment policies and employment conditions in education. During the Great Depression, socialist politicians undertook efforts to tackle its effects on a local level, such as through the provision of relatively generous welfare allowances, aid to farmers, and public works.

The socialism practiced on a local level in the Netherlands came to be known as “Alderman socialism (Wethouderssocialisme)” due to the fact that various socialist reformers served as local aldermen. One of the most famous of these was Floor Wibaut of Amsterdam, under whose direction various measures were carried out including the building of thousands of new homes. Another initiative of Wibaut’s was the establishment of a central market to replace an open-air market; the aim being to ensure that the food trade would be carried out in a more controlled and hygienic way. During the First World War, Wibaut ensured that working-class people were provided with free coal during the winter and established Central Kitchens in which poor residents received evening meals for twelve cents. Under Wibaut, Amsterdam became (according to one study) “a testing ground for the welfare state.”

=== In Denmark ===
From 1900 to 1920, the Social Democrats (Denmark) won a majority in several market towns, either together with the Radicals or by themselves, enabling them to carry out major reforms on a local level. These included the building of new housing, kindergartens, swimming pools, libraries, and schools, together with the provision of dental care for schoolchildren and care for seniors. According to one study, “municipal socialism, combined with social democratic political dominance, was one important part of the emergence of the Danish welfare state.”

=== In Austria ===
Between 1918 and 1934, the Social Democratic Party of Austria had near-total control over the Viennese local government during a period known as Red Vienna. During their rule, the SDAP expanded access to services such as public housing, sanitation, education, day nurseries, orphanages, healthcare, and social assistance. Apart from Vienna, the Social Democrats successfully implemented their program in several other cities.

== Critical reception by communists ==
Vladimir Lenin was sharply critical of municipal socialism when the idea was taken up by Russian Mensheviks in the early twentieth century:

The bourgeois intelligentsia of the West, like the English Fabians, elevate municipal socialism to a special “trend” precisely because it dreams of social peace, of class conciliation, and seeks to divert public attention away from the fundamental questions of the economic system as a whole, and of the state structure as a whole, to minor questions of local self-government. In the sphere of questions in the first category, the class antagonisms stand out most sharply; that is the sphere which, as we have shown, affects the very foundations of the class rule of the bourgeoisie. Hence it is in that sphere that the philistine, reactionary utopia of bringing about socialism piecemeal is particularly hopeless.

Subsequent Leninist groups pursued this critique of municipal socialism in its 1980s incarnation. The Revolutionary Communist Group wrote:

"Municipal socialism" became an avenue that Labour used to retain the allegiance of the new labour aristocracy from the public sector. Many jobs and ‘non-jobs’ were given to this already privileged layer as the left feathered its own nest. Spurious community groups, housing schemes, race relations and ethnic minority units for tiny privileged layers of black and Irish people were set up and paid for. They were all designed to foster the interests of those who found jobs and funding through them, with little benefit to those who were really suffering the onslaught of Thatcherism. Even when "municipal socialism" took on a popular and widely supported position, its limitations were quickly exposed. The Fare's Fair dispute of 1982 showed this at an early stage, after the Law Lords overruled an attempt to introduce cheap fares on London transport, and Ken Livingstone's Greater London Council did not make a serious fight of it. In reality, Thatcher destroyed "municipal socialism" by continually restricting local democracy and the rights of local authorities to raise and spend money.

== See also ==
- Ceinture rouge
- Civic Gospel
- Libertarian municipalism
- Herbert Morrison
- Human Rights City
- Militant tendency
