= Shulamith Koenig =

Israeli human rights activist (1930–2021)

- שולמית קניג
- Born: Shulamith Tzhori; 1930; Jerusalem, Mandatory Palestine
- Died: 2021 (aged 90–91); New York City, United States
- Citizenship: Israel
- Education: Herzliya Hebrew Gymnasium
- Alma mater: Columbia University
- Occupations: Human rights activist Educator
- Organization: Peace Now
- Political party: Ratz
- Spouse: Jerry Koenig
- Children: 2

Shulamith Koenig (née Tzhori, Hebrew: שולמית קניג; 1930–August 2021) was an Israeli human rights activist and educator. After rising to prominence as a proponent of Palestinian rights and the two-state solution, she founded and led the People's Movement for Human Rights Learning (PDHRE). In 2003, Koenig was awarded the United Nations Prize in the Field of Human Rights in recognition of her work in the field of human rights education.

== Biography ==
Koenig was born in Jerusalem, Mandatory Palestine, in 1930. She attended Herzliya Hebrew Gymnasium in Tel Aviv. After her studies and following the outbreak of the 1948 Palestine war, Koenig served in the Negev Brigade of the Palmach; after the establishment of the State of Israel, she worked for a time for the Women's Corps, based in Jerusalem District.

During the 1950s, Koenig went to study engineering and management at Columbia University in the United States, and initially worked on the development of water-saving products. In 1962, she married Jerry Koenig, with whom she had two children.

Upon returning to Israel, Koenig became an activist for the rights of Palestinians and an advocate for the two-state solution. In 1978, Koenig co-founded Peace Now, a peace advocacy group. She was credited with politicising the government of Jordan for the Palestinian cause following a conference in 1982 held after the killings of Palestinian refugees in Sabra and Shatila in Lebanon; June Jordan wrote a poem honouring her bravery.

In 1980, Koenig co-organised the New Outlook Conference, an international symposium to discuss the Israeli–Palestinian peace process, though it was marred by the United States and Israeli governments not giving many of the Palestinian participants travel documents, as well as pressure from the Palestine Liberation Organisation and Rakah for invitees not to attend. In 1988, she was the exhibition administrator for It's Possible, an art show exhibiting art from 24 Israeli and Palestinian artists; the show was displayed in Germany, Japan and the United States.

In Israel, Koenig also became involved in politics after the Prime Minister, Yitzhak Rabin, nominated her to serve on the National Committee on the Status of Women. Koenig was a member of the committee between 1973 and 1977, and ran for a seat in the Knesset in the 1977 election, named eighth on the Ratz list. Ratz won one seat and so Koenig was not elected.

In 1988, Koenig founded and served as the general director of the People's Movement for Human Rights Education (PDHRE), based in New York City, in which she advocated for worldwide human rights education, including the implementation of charters and treaties that enshrined human rights education in local laws and curricula. Koenig's campaigning led to the United Nations declaring the Decade of Human Rights between 1995 and 2004, as well as launching the UN World Programme for Human Rights Education in 2005. The PDHRE held consultations and workshops in 60 countries, and 24 cities signed up to become "human rights cities", including Rosario in Argentina, Nagpur in India, Thiès in Senegal and Graz in Austria.

In 2003, Koenig was awarded the United Nations Prize in the Field of Human Rights in recognition of her work in the field of human rights education.

Koenig died in August 2021. In an obituary, Nancy Flowers described her as "the mother of human rights education".
