= Right to the city =

Idea that a city as a co-created space should be reclaimed

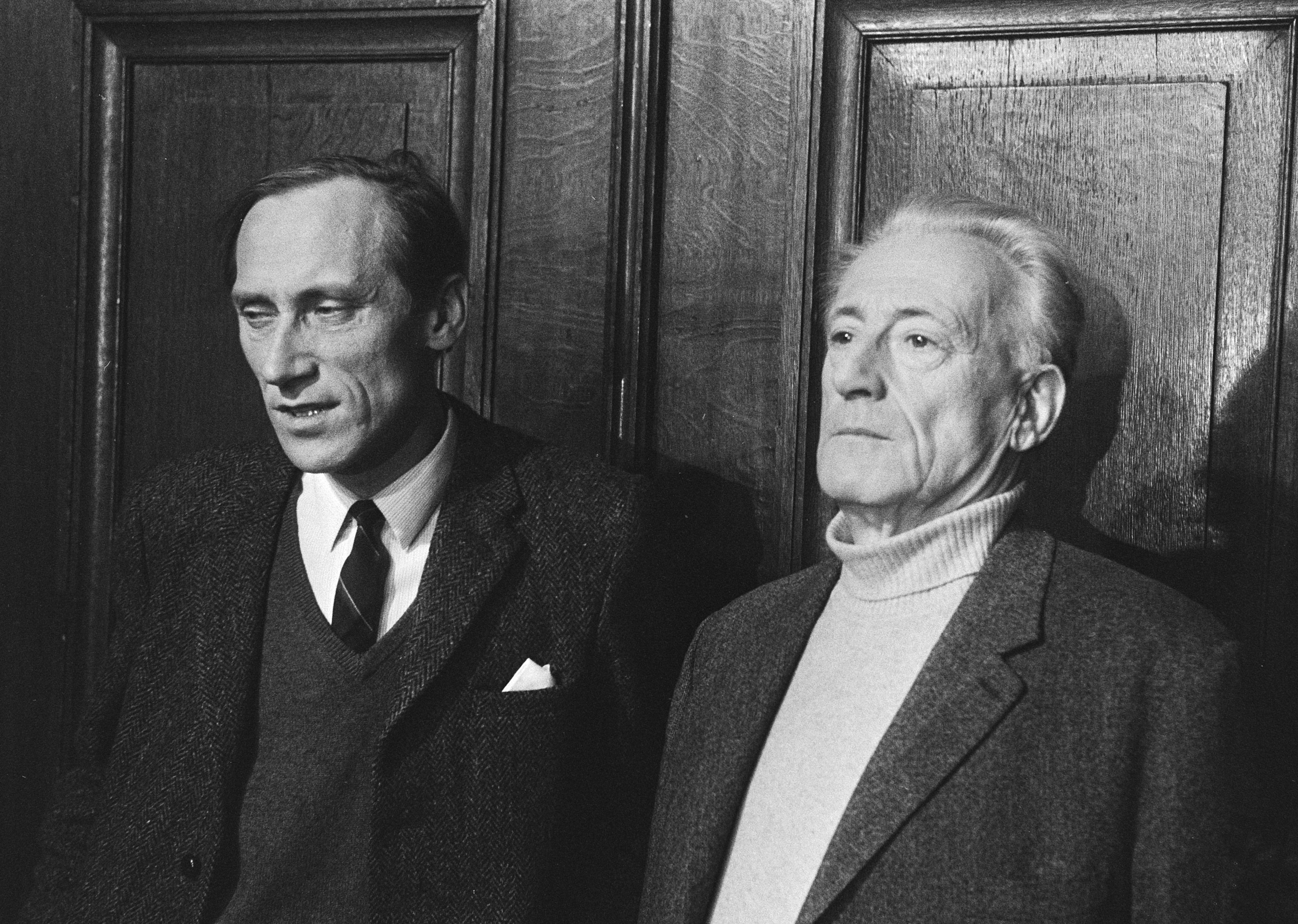
Leszek Kolakowski and Henri Lefebvre in 1971

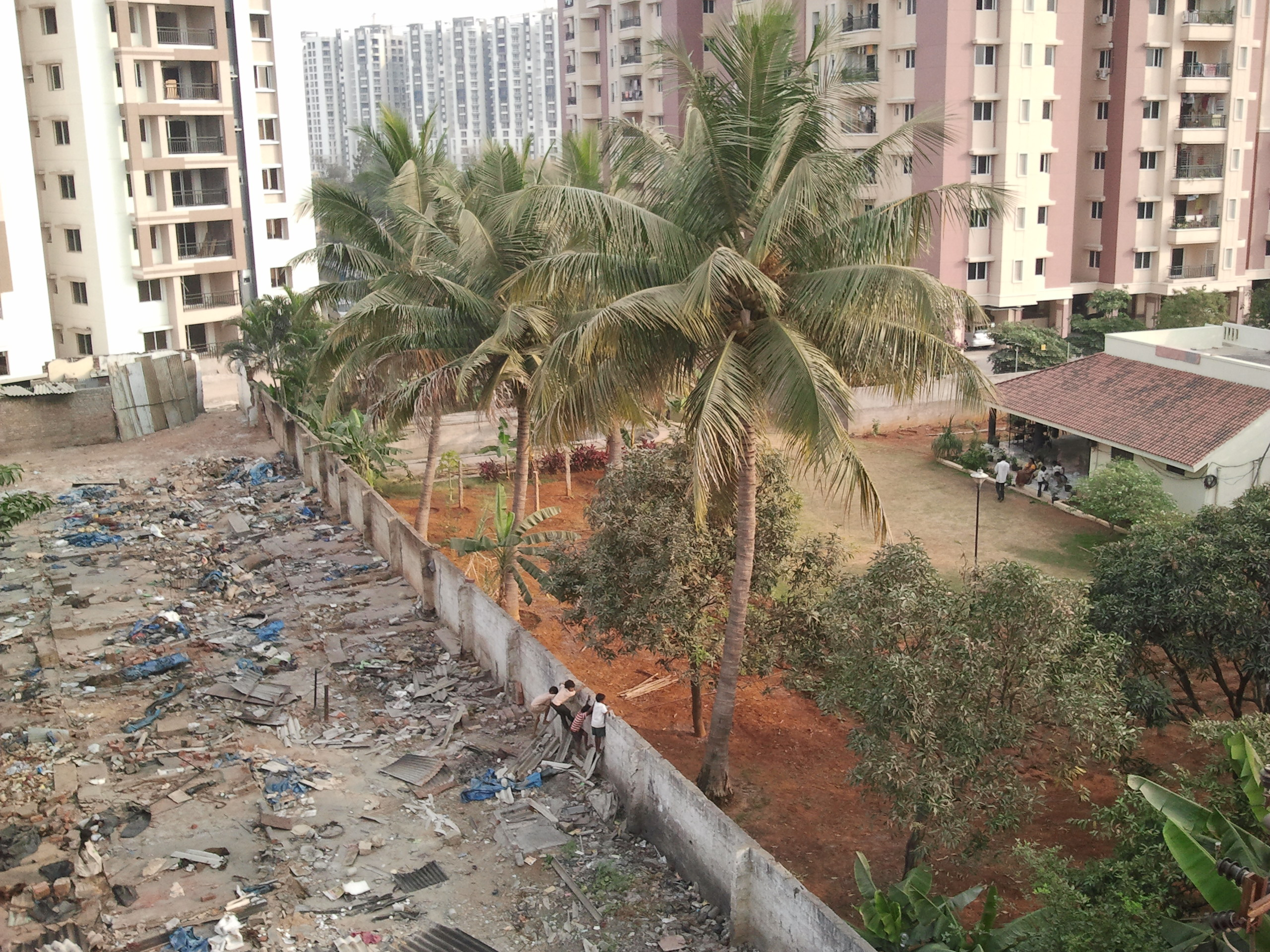
Poor children from a demolished construction workers' slum look at their well-to-do neighbours in Hyderabad

The Right to the City is a concept and slogan that emphasizes the need for inclusivity, accessibility, and democracy in urban spaces. The idea was first articulated by French philosopher Henri Lefebvre in his 1968 book Le Droit à la Ville, in which he argued that urban space should not be solely controlled by market forces, such as commodification and capitalism, but should be shaped and governed by the citizens who inhabit it.

The concept of the Right to the City has been taken up by a variety of social movements and urban activists around the world, who use it as a rallying cry for greater social justice and democracy in the urban environment. The Right to the City can encompass a variety of demands, including demands for government subsidized housing, access to public space, participation in urban governance, and laws against displacement and gentrification, all of which aim to address spatial inequalities in urban areas.

== Overview ==
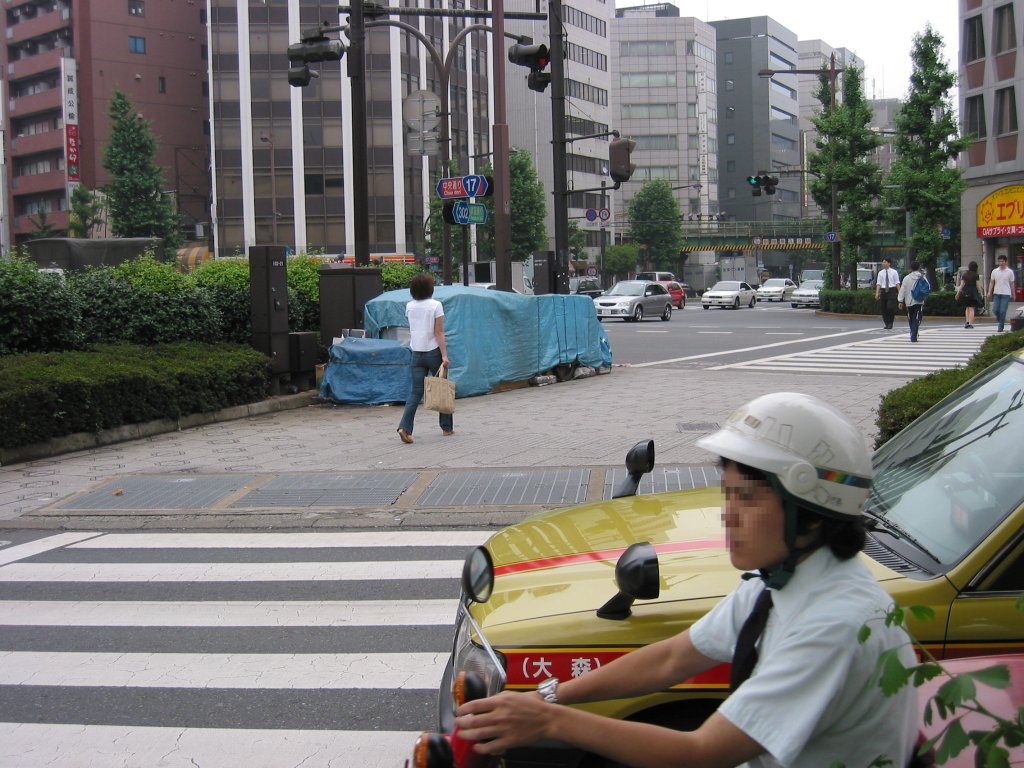
Makeshift house in Tokyo

In his first conception of the concept, Lefebvre placed specific emphasis on the effects that capitalism had over "the city", whereby urban life was downgraded into a commodity, social interaction became increasingly uprooted and urban space and governance were turned into exclusive goods. In opposition to this trend, Lefebvre raised a call to "rescue the citizen as main element and protagonist of the city that he himself had built" and to transform urban space into "a meeting point for building collective life".

Due to the inequalities produced by the rapid increase of the world urban population in most regions of the world, the concept of the right to the city has been recalled on several occasions since the publication of Lefebvre's book as a call to action by social movements and grassroots organizations. In their appeal for "their right to the city", local mobilizations around the world usually refer to their struggle for social justice and dignified access to urban life to face growing urban inequalities (especially in large metropolitan areas). The right to the city has had a particular influence in Latin America and Europe, where social movements have particularly appealed to the concept in their actions and promoted local instruments for advancing its concrete understanding in terms of policy-making at the local and even national level. An example of how the notion of right to the city gained international recognition in the 2010s could be seen in the United Nations' Habitat III process, and how the New Urban Agenda (2016) recognized the concept as the vision of "cities for all".

Lefebvre summarizes the idea as a "demand...[for] a transformed and renewed access to urban life". David Harvey described it as follows:

The right to the city is far more than the individual liberty to access urban resources: it is a right to change ourselves by changing the city. It is, moreover, a common rather than an individual right since this transformation inevitably depends upon the exercise of a collective power to reshape the processes of urbanization. The freedom to make and remake our cities and ourselves is, I want to argue, one of the most precious yet most neglected of our human rights.

== Popular movements of the 2000s and 2010s ==
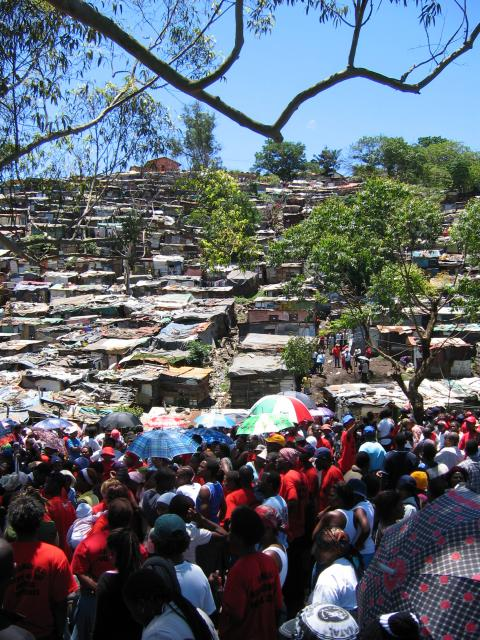
Abahlali baseMjondolo assembly in Durban

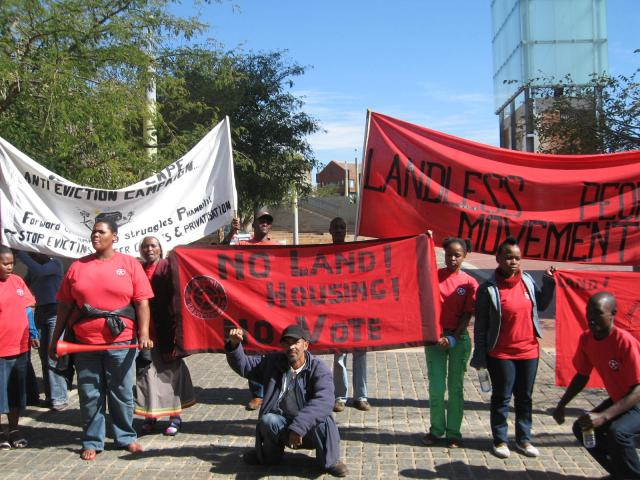
The Poor People's Alliance outside the Constitutional Court in Johannesburg in 2009

Several popular movements, such as the shack dwellers' movement Abahlali baseMjondolo in South Africa, the Right to the City Alliance in the United States, Recht auf Stadt, a network of squatters, tenants and artists in Hamburg, and various movements in Asia and Latin America, incorporated the idea of the right to the city into their struggles in the first few decades of the twenty-first century.

In Brazil 2001 City Statute wrote the Right to the City into federal law.

In the 2010s, scholars proposed a 'Digital Right to the City', which involves thinking about the city as not just bricks and mortar, but also digital code and information.

== Migrants' and refugees' right to the city ==
The concept of a "right to the city" was raised in relation to the Athens refugee squats. According to Tsavdaroglou and Kaika (2021): in the case of Athens, "the refugees' practices for collective production of alternative housing (e.g. clandestine squats) share many characteristics in common with what Lefebvre identified as claiming the right to the city". These squats developed as refugees rejected the official government camps, which were located in remote areas, and moved into city centers with the support of local solidarity groups.

== Criticism ==
Later versions of the concept were criticised with concerns on how the original vision of Henri Lefevbre was reduced to a "citizenship vision", focused only on the implementation of social and economic rights in the city, leaving aside the transformatory nature and the role of social conflict of the original concept. Marcelo Lopes de Souza has for instance argued that as the right to the city has become "fashionable these days", "the price of this has often been the trivialisation and corruption of Lefebvre's concept" and called for fidelity to the original radical meaning of the idea.

== See also ==
- Human Rights City
- Progressivism
- Decommodification
- Right to mobility
