= Rosario Valpuesta =

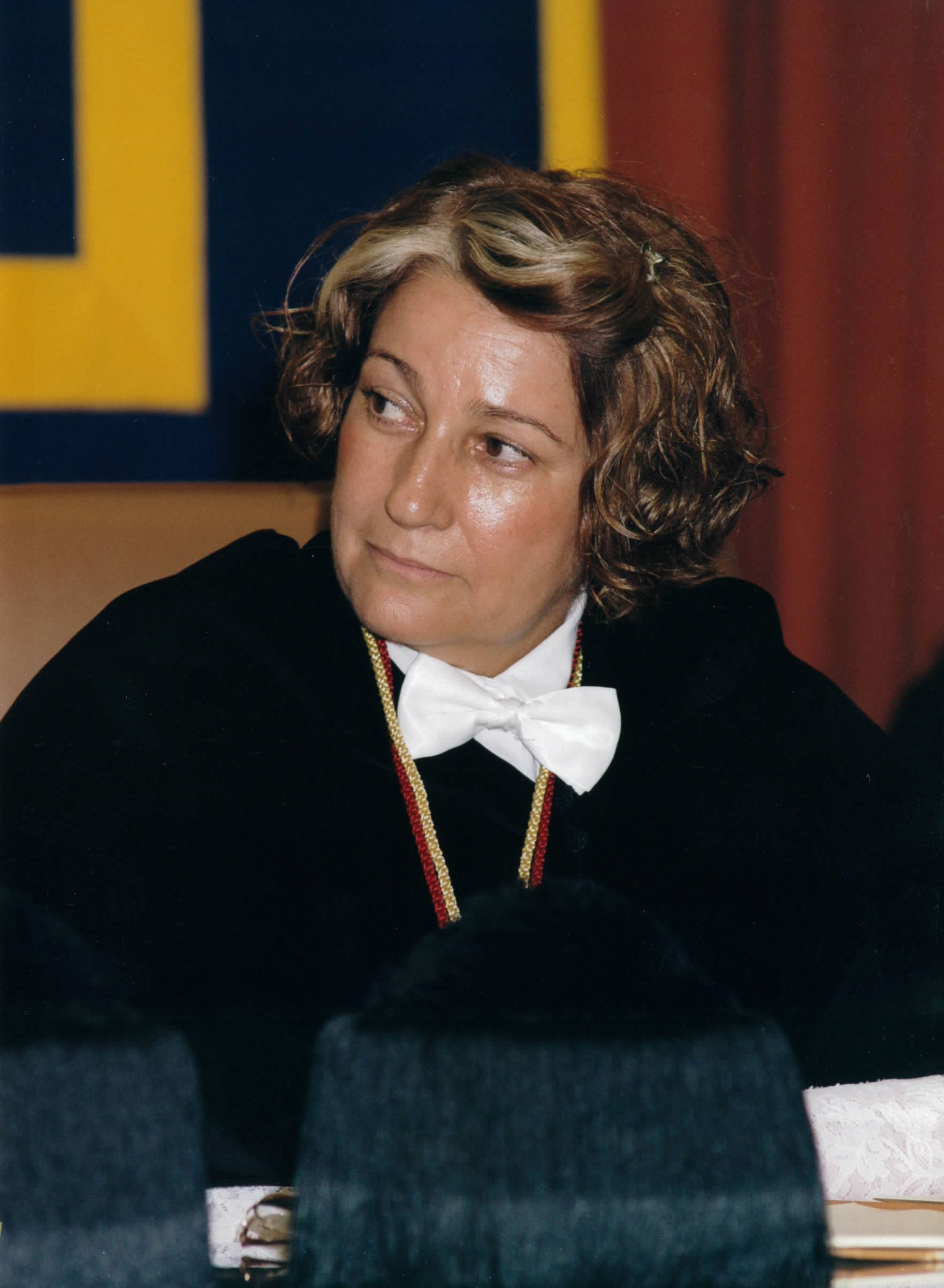
- Born: 1953; Seville, Spain
- Died: 2013 (aged 59–60); Seville, Spain
- Occupations: Professor, researcher
- Children: Fátima Giráldez Valpuesta; Alberto Giráldez Valpuesta

María Rosario Valpuesta Fernández (1953–2013) was a Spanish academic. She was the first Andalusian woman to be in charge of a Rectorate and only the fourth in Spain's history.

== Career ==
Valpuesta was born in Seville, and began her university career at the Faculty of Law of the University of Seville, where she graduated in Law with the qualification of Sobresaliente (Outstanding) 1976. Subsequently, she got her PhD from the same university in 1980 with the highest qualification ("Cum laude"). Her doctoral dissertation, supervised by Prof. Dr. Ángel M. López y López (a Professor of Civil Law at the same University), which was published, dealt with “Los pactos conyunturales de separación de hecho: historia y presente”. Two years later, she became a senior lecturer at the University, and in 1989 she became a Professor of Civil Law at the Faculty of Social and Legal Sciences of Huelva (Spain), which at that time was part of the University of Seville. She later served as a Professor at the University of Huelva, from 1993 until 1997, at the University of Seville from 1997 until 1999, and finally at the Pablo de Olavide University from 1999 until 2013.

Throughout all this time, Professor Valpuesta carried out an extensive research work, which resulted in the publication of several articles, text annotations, monographs, manuals and legal studies of all kinds. Her most important academic contributions were in the field of Family Law.

Manuel Chaves (the former President of the Regional Government of Andalusia) appointed her as the Vice Chancellor of the Pablo de Olavide University (UPO) by statutory order on July 29, 1997. She renewed the position in April 2001, through elections; she occupied the position until June 10, 2003, when Agustín Madrid replaced her.

She arrived at the Pablo de Olavide University with experience in university management, since she had been the Vice-Chancellor of Students at the University of Seville between 1984 and 1986 and the Head of the Department of Civil Law, Private International Law and History of Institutions at the University of Huelva from September 1993 until March 1997. Valpuesta, who held the Chair of Civil Law at UPO, also held other positions outside the academic field. She was Vice-President of the Andalusian Advisory Council (1990-1955), a Counsellor of the Andalusian Advisory Council (1994-1997) and a member of the Andalusian Council for Minor Affairs (2002) and of the Autonomous Commission of Ethics and Research (2003).

She was a member of different research groups, presented papers in national and international conferences and published in specialized journals, among which her collaboration in the collective work Enciclopedia Jurídica Básica stands out. She was also a co-author in several books and published legal annotations on relevant court decisions.

Valpuesta published works of reference such as “Iguales y diferentes ante el derecho privado”, “El levantamiento del Velo: Las Mujeres en el Derecho Privado” or her last work, “La disciplina constitucional de la familia en la experiencia europea”, in the publishing house Tirant lo Blanch.

=== Immigrants’ sit-in at UPO in 2002 ===
One of the incidents that she had to face during her term as a Vice-Chancellor was the sit-in of half a thousand illegal immigrants claiming their regularization in 2002. Finally, after several attempts to resolve the conflict, some altercations with workers and after they had threatened to occupy more buildings, she ordered the eviction of the immigrants from the University premises. Mariano Rajoy (who at the time was Spain's vice-president) linked the protest with the European Council meeting which was being held in Seville during those days, and with a call for a national strike. The People's Party (PP) asked the Andalusian Regional Government at the Regional Parliament to assume “political responsibilities” for “encouraging and protecting” the sit-in of the illegal immigrants at the University premises.

== Feminist activism ==
Rosario Valpuesta was an active participant in feminist movements and she repeatedly criticized women's double shift of work and domestic duties, the lower salaries they received for carrying out the same work as men, as well as the lower presence of women in top management positions. In this sense, she called for “the feminization of power” to facilitate women's access to those positions where decisions are made. She declared in a conference: “In Spain, a politician’s day extends until ten at night, with 13 openings and 13 acts. This is incompatible with a personal life project, except in the case of women who assume the male values”.

She also collaborated in different projects with many town halls in Andalucía in order to raise the awareness of rural women about their situation of subordination and work discrimination. She also worked in Latin America with women who fought for their rights in countries like Colombia, Ecuador, Peru or Bolivia and she participated in many programs to help them fight discrimination toward women. In recognition of her work on women's rights, she received several international awards throughout her career. She was named Honorary Professor of the National University of Saint Anthony the Abbot in Cuzco (Peru) in 1988 and of the University of Andina Simón Bolívar (Quito, Ecuador). In 2002, she received a Diploma of Honor from the Municipal Chamber of Curitiba (Brazil) and in June 2017 the National University of Catamarca in Argentina named her Doctor Honoris Causa.

In Spain, the Civil Guard honored her with the “White Cross of Civil Merit” in October 2001. A year later, she entered the “Real Academia de las Ciencias, Bellas Artes y las Buenas Letras Luis Vélez de Guevara”. In 2004, the University Pablo de Olavide awarded her with the medal of honor of the institution. In 2009, she received the Sociedad Award at the first edition of the Gabriela Sánchez Aranda Awards, and in 2012 she was awarded the Meridiana Award, for her defense of equal rights between men and women. As a posthumous homage to Ms Valpuesta, the city of Seville awarded her with the Medal of the city in 2013, which was accepted by her son, Alberto Giráldez Valpuesta.

== Prof. Valpuesta’s death ==
Aged 60, Rosario Valpuesta died of cancer, from which she had suffered for years, in her home city of Seville. A year before her death, the Regional Government of Andalusia, José Antonio Griñán being its President, awarded her with the Meridiana Award, coinciding with the International Women's Day. In 2009, President Rodríguez Zapatero awarded her with the Plaza de España Award for “her defense of democratic values”; another award was presented to the journalist Iñaki Gabilondo.

The Seville City Council (the Mayor being the socialist politician Alfredo Sánchez Monteseirín) named a street after her, for her activism in feminist and left-wing movements. This street, in the San Lorenzo neighborhood, in the city center, was renamed in accordance with the Spanish Historical Memory Law, which aims at renaming all streets in which any reference is made to Francoist Spain or to the Spanish Civil War. The University Pablo de Olavide paid homage to Rosario Valpuesta after her death.

== Publications ==
- Comentario a la S.T.S. de 22 de julio de 1993, C.C.J.C, septiembre-diciembre, 1994.
- La institucionalización jurídica de la pareja. Registro de parejas de hecho. Las uniones de hecho. II Seminario de Estudios Jurídicos y Criminológicos, Jerez de la Frontera, (Cádiz), 1995.
- Mujer y universidad, Tomás Fernández García y Manuel Marín Sánchez (dirs.) Estado de Bienestar y socialdemocracia, Madrid, 2001, ISBN 84- 206-4466-8, pgs. 303–318.
- Las familias monoparentales: Una perspectiva sobre el Derecho de familia”, Libro Homenaje al Prof. Luis Díez-Picazo, t. III, Madrid, 2003.
- Reflexiones sobre el Derecho de familia, Teoría y Derecho. Revista de Pensamiento Jurídico, 2/2007, pgs. 74–98.
- Comentario a la Ley Orgánica de Igualdad Efectiva de Mujeres y Hombres, Revista del Centro de Estudios Andaluces, 2007.
