= City Statute =

2001 federal law in Brazil

The City Statute (Portuguese: Estatuto da Cidade) is a federal law (Law 10.257) passed in Brazil in 2001 that builds on the Federal Constitution of Brazil to create a new legal-urban order to provide land access and equity in large urban cities. It is premised on the idea of the Right to the city and emerged as a result of many years of popular struggle.

It has two main functions. The first is to ensure that the 'social function' of urban land and buildings is put before their commercial value. This has been defined as "the prioritization of use value over exchange value". The second is to ensure 'democratic city management'. This has been defined as "a path to plan, produce, operate and govern cities subject to social control and participation."

== Critiques ==
It has been argued that, although the legislation is pro-poor, elite actors have been able to use their power to operate in a manner that still privileges elite interests.
