= Institute for the Study of Economic and Social Development =

French research institute

The Institute for the Study of Economic and Social Development (IEDES) is an autonomous part of the University of Paris 1 Panthéon Sorbonne, focusing on multidisciplinary research into societies in the South.

== History ==
=== Creation and Historical Context ===
On October 10, 1946, shortly following World War II, the first National Assembly of the French Fourth Republic was established. Three days later, on October 13, the new French constitution was adopted through a referendum. The new political system implemented by France had to face a difficult post-war reality.

On June 5, 1947, roughly two years after the surrender of Japan to Allied Forces on the 15th of August 1945, United States Secretary of State George Marshall proposed economic assistance to rebuild the economies of European countries affected by the war. In the same year, representatives from 16 countries gathered in Paris to respond to Marshall's proposal. This led to the creation of a common program and a new organization called the Organization for European Economic Cooperation (OEEC) on April 16, 1948. The OEEC, a precursor to the Organization for Economic Co-operation and Development (OECD), was primarily established to coordinate efforts under the European Recovery Program (Marshall Plan) for the reconstruction of a war-devastated continent. The total economic assistance provided by the ERP from April 3, 1947, until the program's conclusion in December 1951, amounted to roughly twelve billion dollars. By 1948, the ERP had brought Western Europe under the influence of the United States, while the Soviet Union had already installed openly communist governments in Eastern Europe. This marked the beginning of the Cold War, which ensued after the Second World War.

On April 4, 1949, during the Marshall Plan, France signed the North Atlantic Treaty with 11 other countries, establishing the North Atlantic Treaty Organization (NATO) as a unified military command to counterbalance the Soviet military presence in Central and Eastern Europe. Later that year, the Soviet Union successfully detonated its first atomic warhead, the RDS-1, ending the United States' previous monopoly on atomic weapons. In 1950, the communist government of North Korea, supported by the Soviets, invaded South Korea, igniting the Korean War, which lasted until 1953. A period of relative calm in the Cold War ensued between 1953 and 1957, largely due to the death of Joseph Stalin in 1953.

On March 2, 1956, France recognized through an agreement that the Treaty of Fes had expired, granting Morocco its independence. A few days later, on March 20, 1956, the Kingdom of Tunisia also achieved complete independence from France as well.

Finally, on October 4, 1957, the Soviet Union launched Sputnik 1, the first artificial Earth satellite, heralding the beginning of the Space Age within the context of the Cold War.

Against the backdrop of the Cold War and the onset of the Space Age, amidst the post-Second World War European reconstruction context and under the political framework of the Fourth Republic, the Institute for the Study of Economic and Social Development was formally established by a decree issued by the French government on October 15, 1957. This institution became an integral part of the University of Paris during a period when certain former French colonies had recently gained independence.

== Publications ==
The publications of IEDES include the Third World Collection and the Third World Review.

IEDES has signed international cooperation agreements with many African and Latin American universities and supports projects implemented by international organizations such as UNESCO. The institute is part of several scientific networks.
