= Cartularies of Valpuesta =

Set of medieval Spanish cartularies

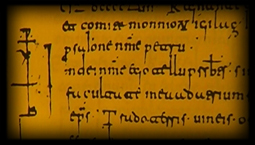
Fragment in Visigothic script

The cartularies of Valpuesta are two medieval Spanish cartularies which belonged to a monastery in the locality of Valpuesta in what is now the province of Burgos, Castile and León, Spain. The cartularies are called the Gótico and the Galicano from the type of script used in each. They are housed in the National Archives of Spain.

The Cartularies of Valpuesta are a series of 12th-century documents which, in turn, are copies of earlier documents, some of which date back to the 9th century. These cartularies contain an abundance of words of a developing Romance dialect and a copious list of place names in the Valley of Gaubea and the surrounding area. Probably no other codex of that period offers so many tokens of an incipient Romance language with similarities with modern Spanish. The scribes did not write in pure, erudite Latin, but rather in a more evolved, Romance-like Latin, to be better understood by the common people. The transcription took place during the formative period of the Kingdom of Castile, and it might reflect the early evolution of the Castilian dialect, although a written standard had yet to be established.

Although the authenticity of some of the texts is disputed, the cartularies are regarded as significant in the history of the Spanish language, and their status as manuscripts containing "the earliest words written in Spanish" has been promoted by the Spanish Royal Academy and other institutions, even though the documents are meant to be written in Latin. They are written in a very late form of Latin mixed with other elements of a Hispanic Romance dialect that corresponds in some traits with modern Spanish.

The preamble of the Statute of Autonomy of Castile and León mentions the cartularies, along with the Nodicia de Kesos, as documents that contain "the earliest traces of Spanish" (las huellas más primitivas del castellano). However, there have been other documents with a claim to being the earliest in Spanish, notably, the Glosas Emilianenses (marginalia of circa 1000 CE from La Rioja). In November 2010, the Spanish Royal Academy endorsed the cartularies—written in "a Latin language assaulted by a living language" ("una lengua latina asaltada por una lengua viva")—as the record of the earliest words written in Castilian, predating those of the Glosas Emilianenses.

== Publication ==
Selections from the oldest documents were published in 1900 in the French journal Revue Hispanique. The cartularies are available in a recent scholarly edition.
