= Valpuesta =

Roman Catholic titular see in Spain

Coordinates: 42.8658°N 3.1236°W

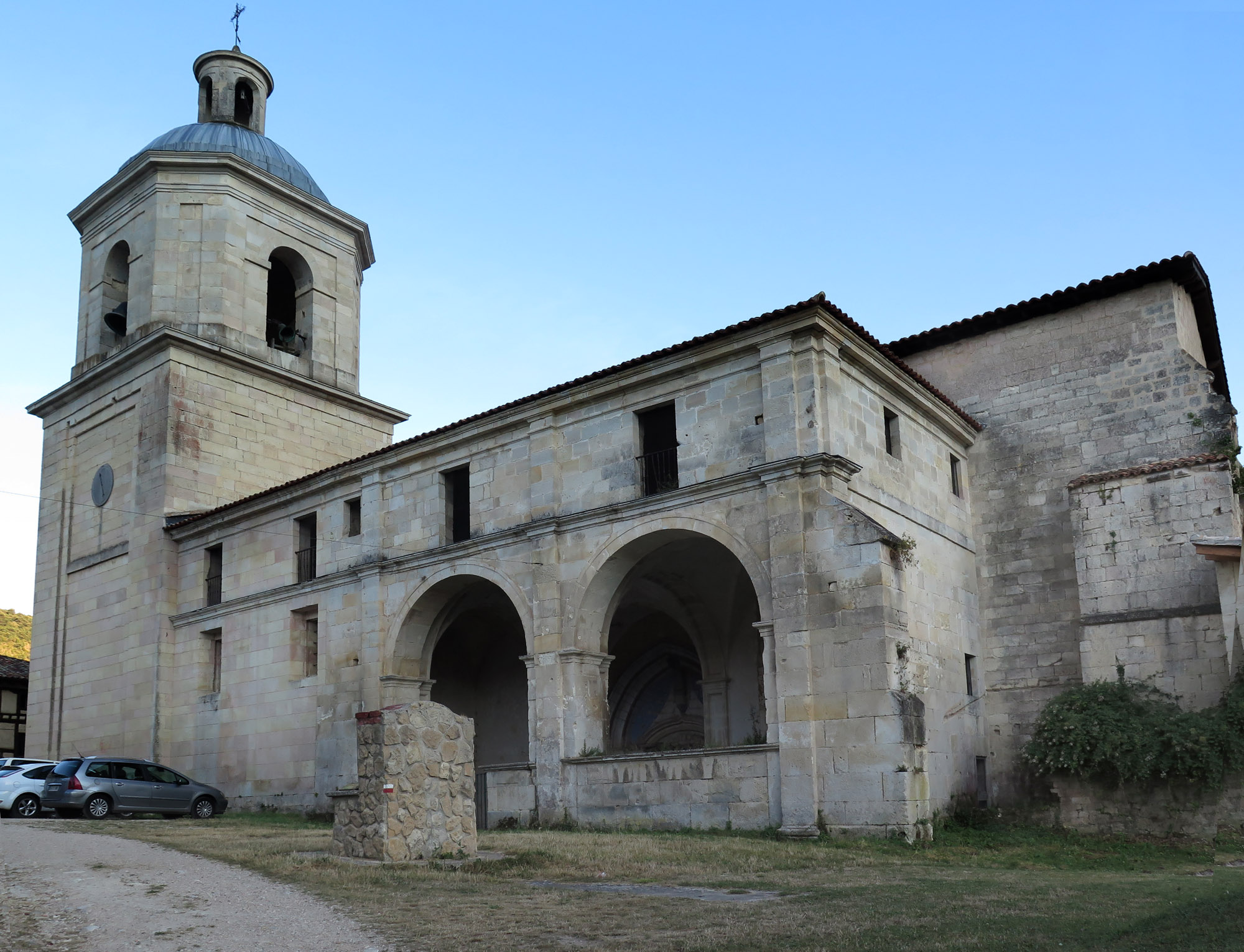
Collegiate church of Santa María

Valpuesta (Latin Valliposita or Valle Conposita) was a Catholic diocese in Castile in northern Spain. Today it is a titular see.

== History ==
According to unreliable documents in the cartularies of Valpuesta, the diocese was established in 804 as a suffragan of the Metropolitan Archdiocese of Tarragona. It was suppressed in 1087 and its territory merged into the then bishopric of Burgos (now a metropolitan Archdiocese).

=== List of bishops ===
- Juan (804)
- Felimir (876–881)
- Fredulf (884–890)
- Diego I (900)
- Diego II (929–957)
- Martin (963–992)
- Velasco (1008–1011)
- Sancho (1011–1022)
- Munio I (1024–1037)
- Ato (1037–1049)
- García (1049–1052)
- Gómez (1052–1065)
- Munio II (1065–1087)

== Titular see of Valliposita ==
The diocese was nominally revived in 1969 as a titular bishopric of the lowest (episcopal) rank.

It since has the following (near-)consecutive, so-far regular (not secular) incumbents, so far of the fitting Episcopal (lowest) rank:

- Louis La Ravoire Morrow, Salesians (S.D.B.) (born USA) (1969.10.31 – retired 1971.04.27) on emeritate as former Bishop of Krishnagar (India) (1939.05.25 – resigned 1969.10.31); died 1987
- Constantino José Lüers, Friars Minor (O.F.M.) (born Germany) (1973.04.13 – 1976.03.24) as Bishop-Prelate of Territorial Prelature of Óbidos (Brazil) (1973.04.13 – 1976.03.24), later Bishop of Penedo (Brazil) (1976.03.24 – retired 1994.01.26); died 1997
- Joseph Abel Francis, Divine Word Missionaries (S.V.D.) (1976.05.03 – death 1997.09.01) as Auxiliary Bishop of Newark (USA) (1976.05.03 – 1995.06.30) and on emeritate
- Angelito R. Lampon, Oblates of Mary Immaculate (O.M.I.) (1997.11.21 – 2018.11.06), as Apostolic Vicar of Jolo (Philippines), later Archbishop of Roman Catholic Archdiocese of Cotabato (Philippines) (2019.01.31 - ...).
- Sebastián Chico Martinez, (2019.02.20 - ...), as Auxiliary Bishop of Roman Catholic Diocese of Cartagena (Spain).

== Sources and external links ==
- GigaCatholic, with Google satellite photo
