= Marcelo Lopes de Souza =

Marcelo Lopes de Souza is a professor of socio-spatial development and political ecology at the Department of Geography of the Federal University of Rio de Janeiro, where he co-ordinates the Núcleo de Pesquisas sobre Desenvolvimento Sócio-Espacial/NuPeD (Research Centre on Socio-Spatial Development). He received the first prize of the German Society of Research on Latin America in 1994 for his PhD thesis (which was published in Germany) about the urban question in Brazil, and the Prêmio Jabuti (this prize is given every year to Brazil's best literary and scientific works by the Brazilian Book Chamber) for his book O desafio metropolitano (The Metropolitan Challenge) in 2001. His book Fobópole: O medo generalizado e a militarização da questão urbana (Phobopolis: Generalised Fear and the Militarisation of the Urban Question), published in 2008, was nominated for the Jabuti Award in 2009.

== Intellectual Contribution ==
He pioneered the study of spatiality and the social production of space from an ‘autonomist’ perspective (mainly inspired by Cornelius Castoriadis’s political-philosophical work) as early as in the 1980s. Marcelo Lopes de Souza regards himself as a 'libertário' (left-libertarian). From his viewpoint, the (left-)libertarian thought and praxis encompasses not only anarchism (or, as he prefers, ‘classical anarchism’) - second half of the 19th century and first half of the 20th century - and neo-anarchism - from the second half of the 20th century onwards (for instance, Murray Bookchin) -, but also ‘autonomist libertarian’ authors (such as Castoriadis) and movements (such as Mexican Zapatistas, a large part of Argentine ‘piqueteros,’ and so on).

His research projects have covered several themes related to the interdisciplinary field of urban studies and, more recently, to the interface of urban studies and political ecology. He has contributed to critical environmental geography and political ecology (especially urban political ecology) from a left-libertarian perspective, focusing above all on the problems of environmental injustice and the conservative (or conservatively instrumentalised) discourses about environmental risk and protection.

== Studies ==
He studied geography and urban sociology in Brazil in the 1980s, and received his PhD degree in geography (Nebenfach [minor]: political science) from the University of Tübingen (Germany) in 1993.

== Career ==
He acted as a visiting researcher at the Geography Department of the University of Tübingen (1996 and 2000/2001) and at the Geography Department of the Royal Holloway College, University of London (1999), as well as a visiting professor at the Habitat Unit of Technische Universität Berlin (2005), at the Graduate Programme on Latin American Studies of the Universidad Nacional Autónoma de México (2008), at the European University Viadrina Frankfurt (Oder) (2009–2010), at the Colegio de Geografía of the Universidad Nacional Autónoma de México (2012) and at the Department of Political Science and International Relations of the Universidad Autónoma de Madrid (2013–2014).

Since the mid-1990s, Marcelo Lopes de Souza has acted as a coordinator or co-coordinator of a number of research projects, which have covered themes such as: urban violence and the ‘militarisation of the urban question’ in different countries; potentialities, limits and problems of ‘participative urban planning and management’; the spatial practices of emancipative social movements in Brazil, Argentina, Mexico and South Africa; and environmental (in)justice and urban-environmental struggles in Brazil. He founded the Rede de Pesquisadores em Geografia (Socio)Ambiental (Network of Research on [Socio-]Environmental Geography) in 2017, whose focus is on critical environmental geography and political ecology.

== Writings and participation in editorial boards ==
Marcelo Lopes de Souza published eleven books and more than one hundred papers and book chapters in different languages (Portuguese, English, German, Spanish, French and Turkish) covering subjects such as spatial theory, participation in urban planning, movements theory (focusing especially on the spatial dimension of urban and environmental movements), urban ‘utopias’/alternative visions, urban problems, and urban political ecology. His books include, besides the ones previously mentioned, Mudar a cidade (Changing the City, 2002, 11th edition 2016) and A prisão e a ágora (The Prison and the Ágora, 2006), among others.

He is one of the editors of the prestigious Brazilian urban studies journal Cidades, and is associate editor of the international journalCity (published by Routledge) as well. He belongs to the advisory board of the journals sub\urban.zeitschrift für kritische stadtforschung (Germany; since 2012), ACME: An International Journal for Critical Geographies (UK; since 2016) and Territorios (Argentina; since 2017). He further belonged to the Advisory Board of Antipode: A Radical Journal of Geography (published by Wiley-Blackwell) between 2010 and 2104.

== Activism ==
Marcelo Lopes de Souza has collaborated with urban movements organisations since the 1980s, especially with different organisations of Brazil's movement (‘roofless’ workers’ movement, urban counterpart to the better-known landless workers’ movement) in different ways, from 'recherche-action' to activists in the framework of study groups and political seminars to the organisation of public events. More recently, his contributions as an activist have been mainly related to the struggle against environmental injustice in Brazilian cities.

== Books ==
- 1996 – Urbanização e desenvolvimento no Brasil atual. São Paulo: Ática.
- 2000 – O desafio metropolitano. A problemática sócio-espacial nas metrópoles brasileiras. Rio de Janeiro: Bertrand Brasil.
- 2002 – Mudar a cidade. Uma introdução crítica ao planejamento e à gestão urbanos. Rio de Janeiro: Bertrand Brasil.
- 2003 – ABC do desenvolvimento urbano. Rio de Janeiro: Bertrand Brasil.
- 2004 – Planejamento urbano e ativismos sociais (em co-autoria com Glauco B. Rodrigues). São Paulo: Editora UNESP.
- 2006 – A prisão e a ágora. Reflexões sobre a democratização do planejamento e da gestão das cidades. Rio de Janeiro: Bertrand Brasil.
- 2008 – Fobópole. O medo generalizado e a militarização da questão urbana. Rio de Janeiro: Bertrand Brasil.
- 2011– A produção do espaço urbano. Agentes e processos, escalas e desafios (co-editor along with Ana Fani Alessandri Carlos and Maria Encarnação Beltrão Sposito). São Paulo: Contexto.
- 2013 – Os conceitos fundamentais da pesquisa sócio-espacial". Rio de Janeiro: Bertrand Brasil.
- 2015 – Dos espaços de controle aos territórios dissidentes: Escritos de divulgação científica e análise política. Rio de Janeiro: Consequência.
- 2016 – The Radicalization of Pedagogy (= first volume of the trilogy Anarchism, Geography, and the Spirit of Revolt). (Co-editor along with Simon Springer and Richard J. White). Londres: Rowman& Littlefield.
- 2016 – Theories of Resistance (= second volume of the trilogy Anarchism, Geography, and the Spirit of Revolt). (Co-editor along with Simon Springer and Richard J. White). Londres: Rowman& Littlefield.
- 2016 – The Practice of Freedom (= third volume of the trilogy Anarchism, Geography, and the Spirit of Revolt). (Co-editor along with Simon Springer and Richard J. White). Londres: Rowman& Littlefield.
- 2017 – Por uma Geografia libertária. Rio de Janeiro: Consequência.
