= Pablo de Olavide University =

Public university in Seville, Spain

Universidad Pablo de Olavide
- Seal of Pablo de Olavide University
- Type: Public
- Established: 1997
- Rector: Francisco Oliva Blázquez
- Faculty: 1,032
- Students: 10,858
- Location: Seville, Andalusia, Spain; 37.355°N 5.938°W
- Campus: 346 acres (140 ha)
- Website: sede.upo.es

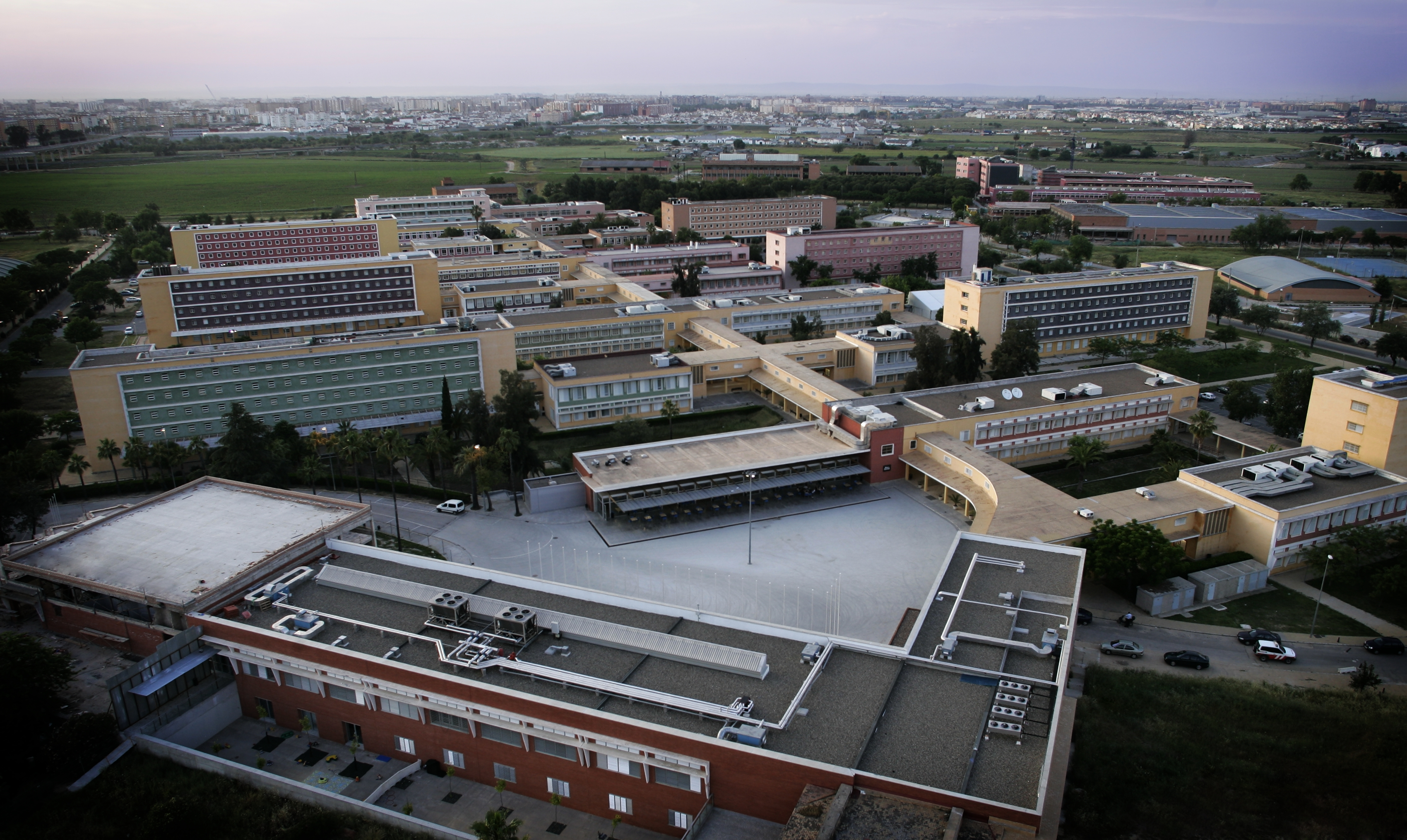
View of UPO campus

Pablo de Olavide University (Universidad Pablo de Olavide (UPO) in Spanish) is a public university in Seville, Spain. UPO offers both undergraduate and graduate programs in the traditional majors, as well as in biotechnology, environmental sciences, humanities, labor relations, second language acquisition, social work, sports sciences, and translation.

Pablo de Olavide University (UPO) was founded in 1997, making it one of the newest public universities in Spain. UPO has over 10,000 students and has been growing constantly since its inception.

The university is named after the Spanish-Peruvian politician Pablo de Olavide (1725–1803), who contributed notably to planning the city of Seville.

Being a relatively young university, UPO was planned as a North American-style campus with dedicated academic and residential space. Its 345 acres spread out southeast of Seville over the municipalities of Dos Hermanas, Alcalá de Guadaíra and Seville. Its facilities are modern, including campus-wide Wi-Fi and internet access, computer, television, video and audio centers, an open access library, sports facilities, and science laboratories.

It has numerous sports facilities, lawns, a gym and a large library where there are books on every subject. The university also boasts a student union building and offers transportation to the city center by bus or metro.

== Academics ==
The university is organized into seven faculties and schools:

- Faculty of Experimental Sciences
- Faculty of Business
- Faculty of Social Sciences
- Faculty of Sport
- Faculty of Law, Universidad Pablo de Olavide of Seville. Degrees in Law; Political Science and Public Administration; Criminology; and Human Resources
- Faculty of Humanities
- Polytechnic School
- Postgraduate Studies Centre

=== Bachelor’s degrees ===
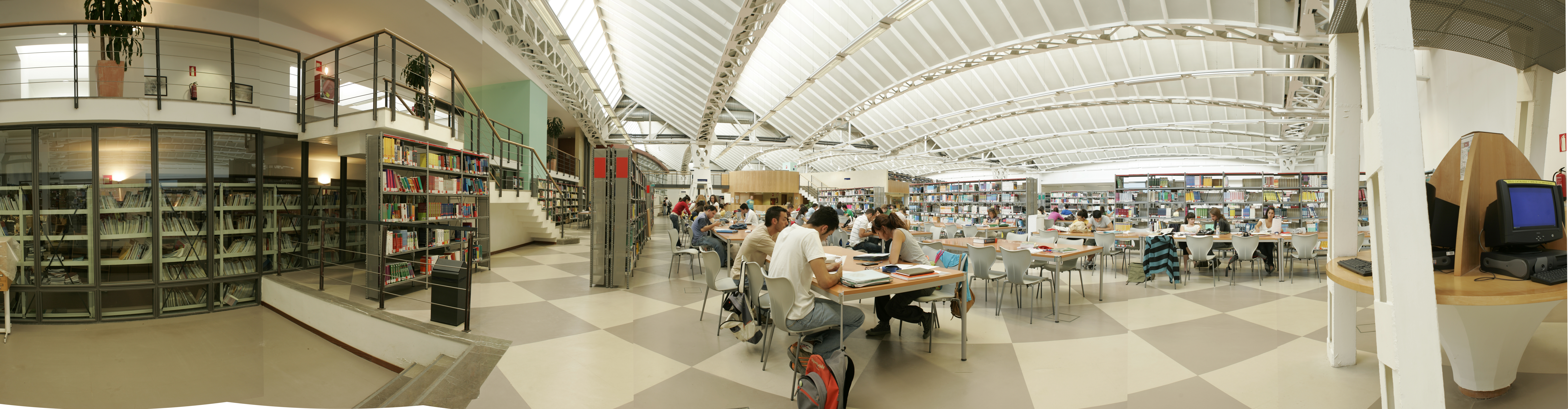
UPO Library

- Law
- Business Management and Administration
- Accounting & Finance
- Political and Administration Sciences
- Labour Relations and Human Resources
- Geography and History
- Sociology
- Translation and Interpreting (English, French or German)
- Social Work
- Social Education
- Humanities
- Biotechnology
- Environmental Science
- Human Nutrition and Dietetics
- Sport and Exercise Sciences
- Computer Engineering in Information Systems
- Criminology
- Economic Analysis

=== Double degrees ===
- Social Work and Social Education
- Sociology and Social Work
- Sociology and Political Science and Public Administration
- Law & Political And Administration Sciences
- Law & Business Management and Administration
- Law + Accounting & Finance
- Humanities & Translation and Interpreting
- Environmental Sciences + Geography and History
- Environmental Sciences + Agricultural Engineering (US)

=== Graduate studies ===
The broad range of official master's degrees and doctoral studies offered by Pablo de Olavide University will allow students to specialize within a professional field or to start a career as a researcher. CEDEP is the center responsible for the coordination of graduate studies. This centre is responsible for the inscription, enrolment and grant proceedings.

Since January 2011 Pablo de Olavide University, in conjunction with Brussels-based human rights NGO Protection International, has offered an online Postgraduate Diploma (PgDip) on the Integral Protection for Human Rights Defenders and Social Activists in both English and Spanish. The PgDip is aimed at staff of NGOs and human rights association activists; civil servants from the different local, community and national administrations; staff from international and inter-governmental organisations; and citizens willing to be involved in social transformation processes.

== The International Center ==
As of the 2010-2011 academic year, the UPO enrolled 600 international students. The UPO began admitting North American study abroad students in 2001, and founded the International Center in 2002. The center manages the three program tracks available to incoming students. The most popular is the semester-long Hispanic Studies Program with courses both in Spanish and in English. The Center also offers the University Integration Program (P.I.U.) for students with advanced Spanish language skills, as well as a Spanish-language track throughout the year. The Center is accredited by the Cervantes Institute.

Additionally, 268 universities and organizations from 42 countries have signed agreements with the UPO to set up exchanges, such as Academic Programs International (API), the Council on International Educational Exchange (CIEE) and International Studies Abroad.

== Sports ==
In the University's Sports Service (SDUPO), the practice of physical activities and sports are thought to be the key element for the integral preparation of the student. To encourage students, it makes the practice of sports possible to the entire university community. For this reason, the university has several sports facilities, located directly on the campus.

Furthermore, the Sports Office plans, manages and organizes sports activities at Pablo de Olavide University. It makes sure the University has the appropriate facilities, services, and competitions needed for the practice of sports. The UPO also offers the possibility to study sport in the Faculty of Sports. The Sports Office Director is Juan Carlos Fernández Truan.

== Statistics ==
Year 2010

- Since 1997
- 10,741 students (57.63% women, 42.37% men)
- 1,032 teaching staff
- 65 research groups
- 18 degrees & 6 double degrees (2010–2011)
- 40 official master's degree programs
- 18 doctorate degrees
- 136 ha campus
- 100,000 square meters of sports facilities
- 5 km - distance to city center
- 635 companies collaborate with UPO
- 268 universities from 42 countries have signed agreements with UPO
- 748,860 library resources
- €80,160,718.22 - 2010 budget
- It holds the No. 3 position in the ranking of research output of Spanish universities

== Programmes and scholarships ==
There are various programmes and international scholarships that offer the students of Pablo de Olavide University the possibility to travel abroad. Among the most prominent are:

- Erasmus Programme
- Programme Atlanticus (bilateral programmes with universities in the USA, Canada and Australia)
- PIMA (“Intercambio y Movilidad Académica”, programme of the Organization of Ibero-American States)
- Programme Mexicalia (bilateral programme with universities in Mexico)
- Programme UPO-PUCP (bilateral programme with universities in Peru)
- Programme "Becas Iberoamérica Santander"

== Summer courses in Carmona ==
The Summer Courses of UPO take place every summer in Carmona, Seville. Everyone can attend these courses.

== Notable faculty ==
- Alicia Troncoso Lora
- Rosario Valpuesta
