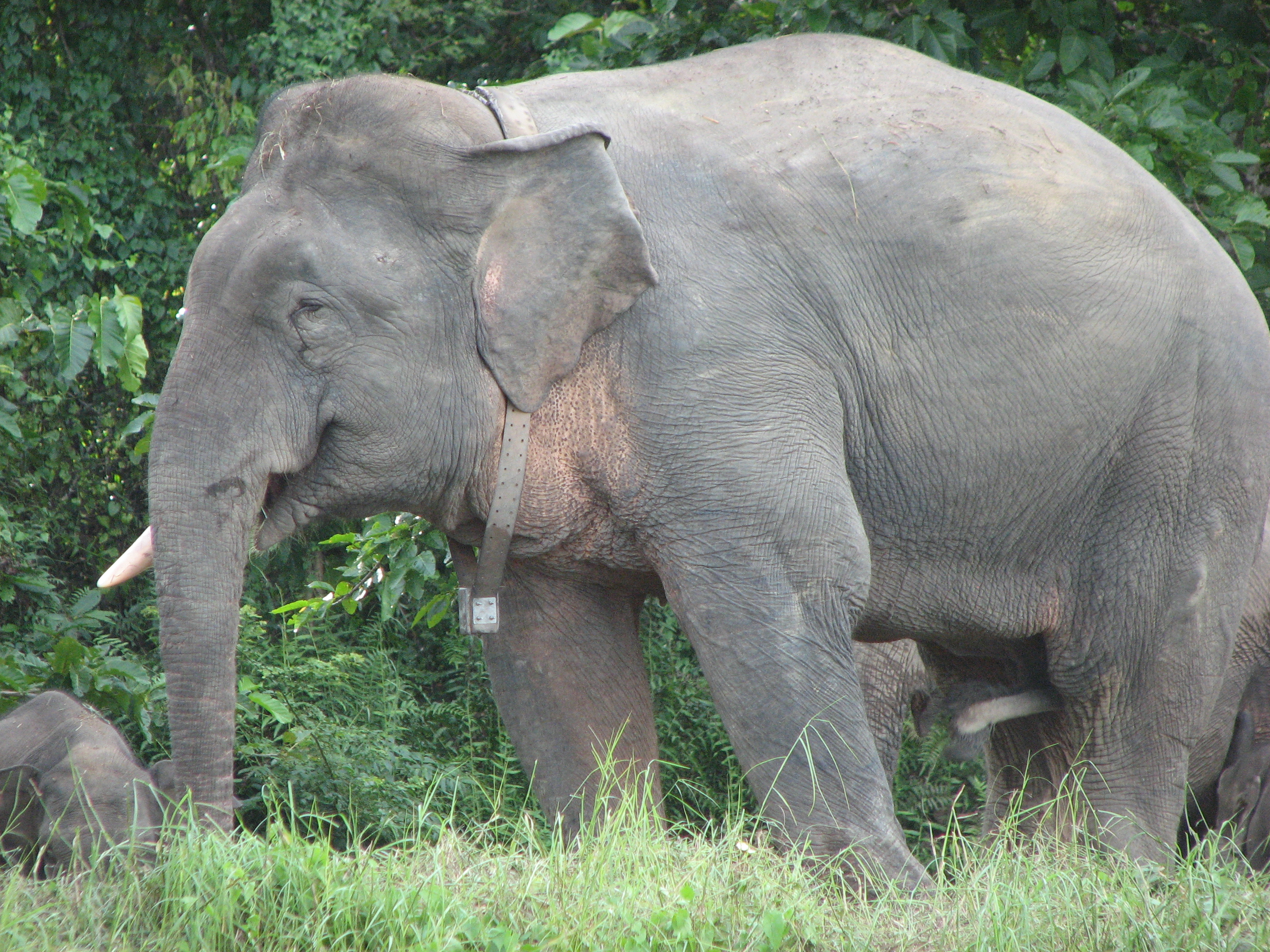

Conservation status
- Endangered (IUCN 3.1)

Scientific classification
- Kingdom: Animalia
- Phylum: Chordata
- Class: Mammalia
- Order: Proboscidea
- Family: Elephantidae
- Genus: Elephas
- Species: E. maximus
- Subspecies: E. m. borneensis

Trinomial name
- Elephas maximus borneensis Deraniyagala, 1950
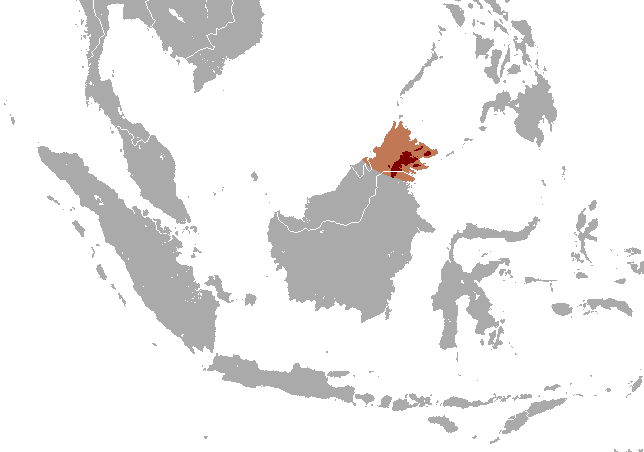
- The former and recent range map of the Bornean elephant

= Borneo elephant =

Subspecies of elephant

The Borneo elephant, also called the Bornean elephant or the Borneo pygmy elephant, is a subspecies of Asian elephant (Elephas maximus) that inhabits northeastern Borneo. Its origin remains the subject of debate. A definitive subspecific classification as Elephas maximus borneensis awaits a detailed range-wide morphometric and genetic study. In 2024, the Borneo elephant was listed as Endangered on the IUCN Red List as the population has declined by at least 50% over the last three generations, estimated to be 60–75 years. It is preeminently threatened by loss, degradation and fragmentation of habitat.

The Sultan of Sulu was thought to have introduced captive elephants to Borneo in the 18th century, which were released into the jungle. Comparison of the Borneo elephant population to putative source populations in DNA analysis indicates that the Borneo elephants are more likely to have derived from Sundaic stock and are indigenous to Borneo, rather than having been introduced by humans. The genetic divergence of Borneo elephants warrants their recognition as a separate evolutionarily significant unit.

== Characteristics ==
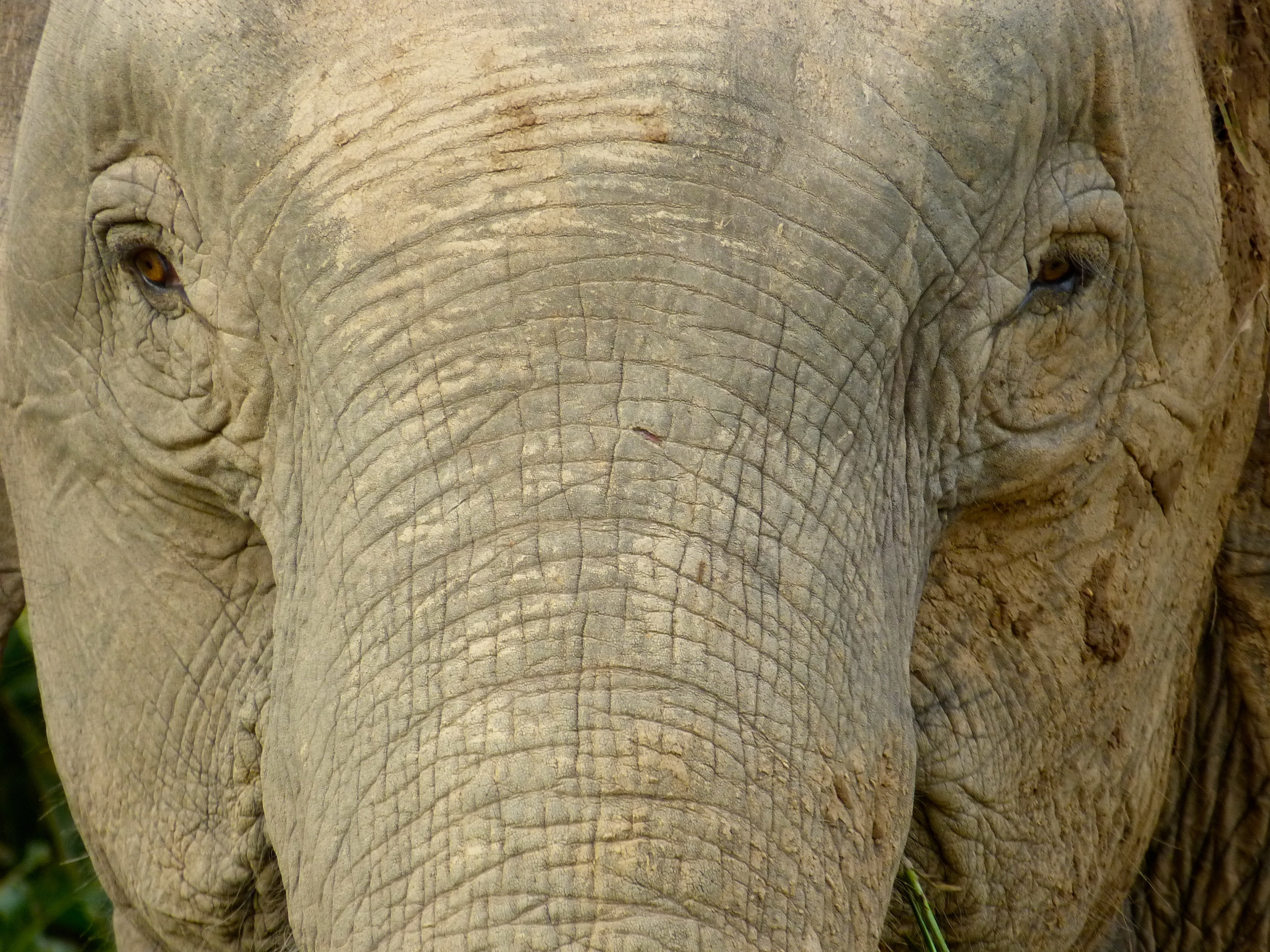
A close-up of the face of an elephant near Kinabatangan River, Sukau, Sabah, Malaysia

In general, Asian elephants are smaller than African elephants and have the highest body point on the head. The tip of their trunk has one finger-like process. Their back is convex or level.

It has become commonplace to refer to the Borneo elephant as a 'pygmy' subspecies, although adult elephants of Sabah of both genders are similar in height to their counterparts in Peninsular Malaysia. Five measurements of the skull of a fully adult female elephant from Gomantong Forest Reserve were slightly smaller (72–90%) than comparable dimensions averaged for two Sumatran skulls. Few available measurements show that they are of similar size to other populations of the Sunda subregion.

Morphological measurements of fifteen captive elephants from Peninsular Malaysia and of six elephants from Sabah were taken between April 2005 and January 2006, and repeated three times for each elephant and averaged. There was no significant difference in any of the characters between the two captive populations.

They are also remarkably tame and passive, another reason some scientists think they descended from a domestic collection.

== Distribution and habitat ==
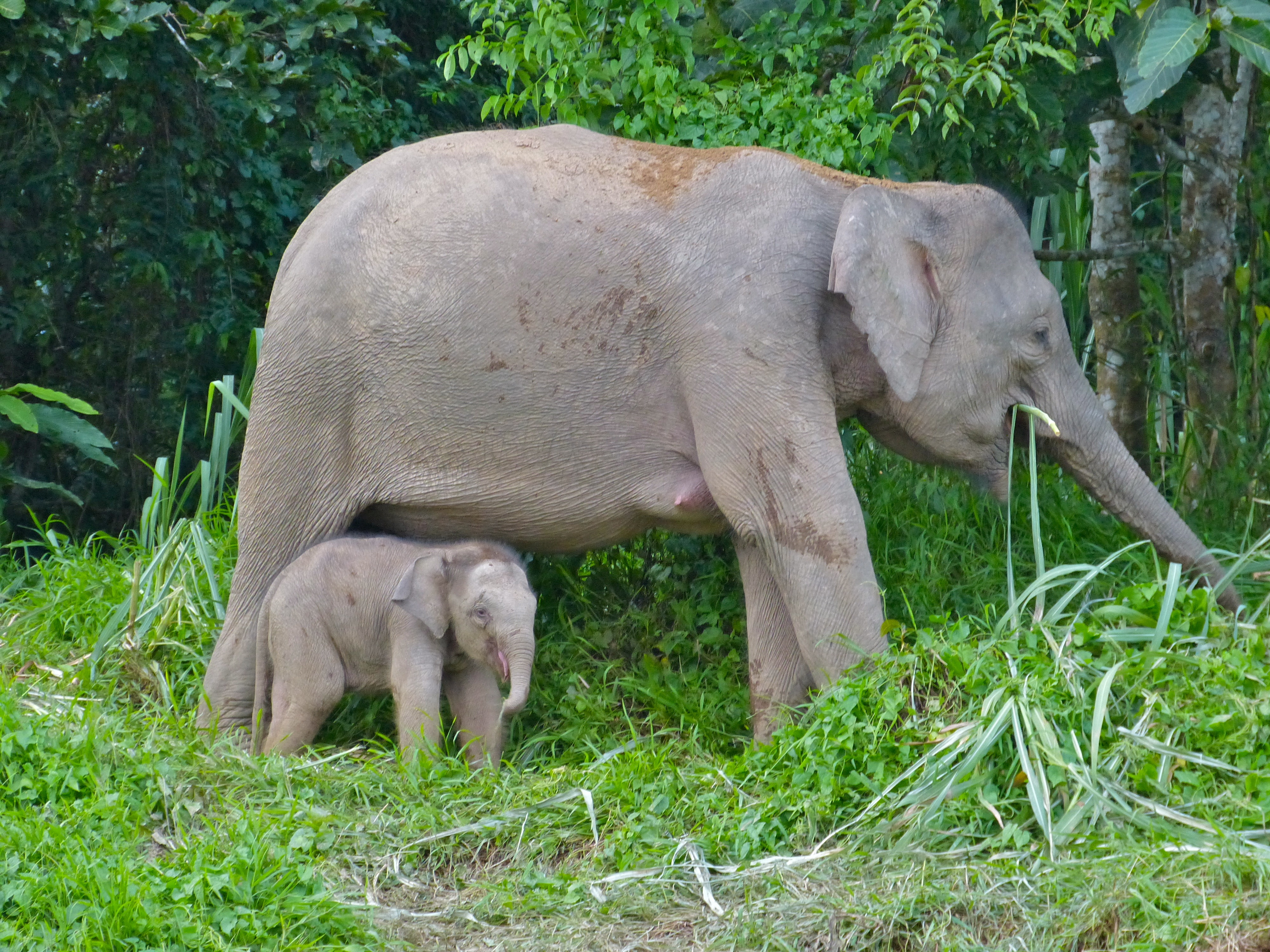
A female elephant with her calf near the Kinabatangan River

Elephants are confined to the northern and northeastern parts of Borneo. In the 1980s, there were two distinct populations: One lived in Sabah, ranging over the Tabin Wildlife Reserve and adjacent mostly logged dipterocarp forest on steep terrain; the other inhabited the hilly interior at about 300 to 1,500 m (980 to 4,920 ft) altitude in dipterocarp forest, which was largely undisturbed at the time and only logged at its periphery. In Kalimantan, their range is restricted to a small contiguous area of the upper Sembakung River in the east.

The range of wild elephants in Sabah and Kalimantan seems to have expanded very little in the past 100 years despite access to suitable habitat elsewhere on Borneo. Borneo's soil tends to be young, leached, and infertile, and there is speculation that the distribution of wild elephants on the island may be limited by the occurrence of natural mineral sources.

In 1992, the estimated elephant population size in Sabah ranged from 500 to 2,000 individuals, based on survey work conducted in the Tabin Wildlife Reserve, in Lower Kinabatangan District and in the Deramakot Forest Reserve. An elephant population census was conducted in Sabah between July 2007 and December 2008, counting dung piles along 216 line transects in five main elephant managed ranges, covering a total distance of 186.12 km (115.65 mi). Results of this survey suggest an elephant population of 1,184–3,652 individuals inhabiting the ranges of Tabin, Lower Kinabatangan, North Kinabatangan, Ulu Kalumpang Forest Reserve and the central forest of Sabah. The elephant density and population size varied throughout the five key ranges affected by (i) conversion of lowland forest, (ii) fragmentation of habitat, and (iii) existing land use activities such as logging. The upper catchment of Ulu Segama Forest Reserve had the highest density of elephants with 3.69 elephants per 1 km^{2} (0.39 sq mi). Only the unprotected central forest area supported an elephant population of more than 1,000 individuals.

In 2005, five female elephants were fitted with tracking devices to study their home range and movement patterns in Sabah. Results suggest that elephant herds occupied a minimum home range from 250 to 400 km^{2} (97 to 154 sq mi) in non-fragmented forest, while in fragmented forest habitat, the annual home range for elephants is estimated to be around 600 km^{2} (230 sq mi).

== Threats ==
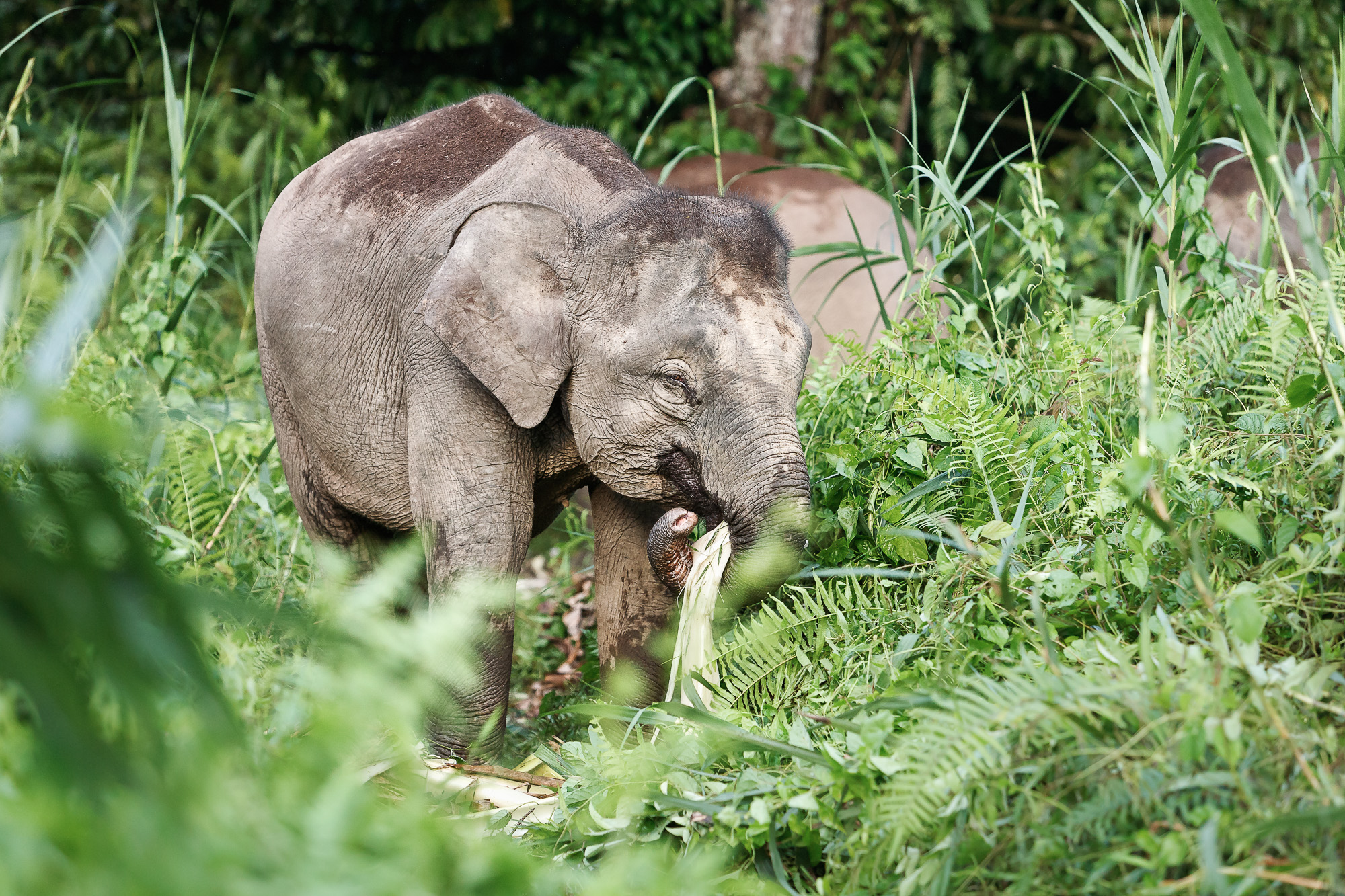
A Bornean pygmy elephant feeding near a farmer's field along the Kinabatangan River in Sabah, Malaysia

The pre-eminent threats to the Asian elephant today are habitat loss, degradation, and fragmentation, which are driven by an expanding human population, and lead in turn to increasing conflicts between humans and elephants when elephants eat or trample crops. Hundreds of people and elephants are killed annually as a result of such conflicts.

Expanding human development disrupts their migration routes, depletes their food sources, and destroys their habitat.

Another threat is insufficient forestation or a lack of trees due to logging. Borneo elephants need 100–225 L (22–49 imp gal; 26–59 US gal) of water a day and if it is harder to find because of climatic conditions or cutting their resource of water supply, their only option is to migrate to where they can find that resource to survive.

As of April 2012, an estimated 20–80 elephants range near 22 villages in the Sebuku subdistrict of Nunukan, North Kalimantan.

== Conservation ==
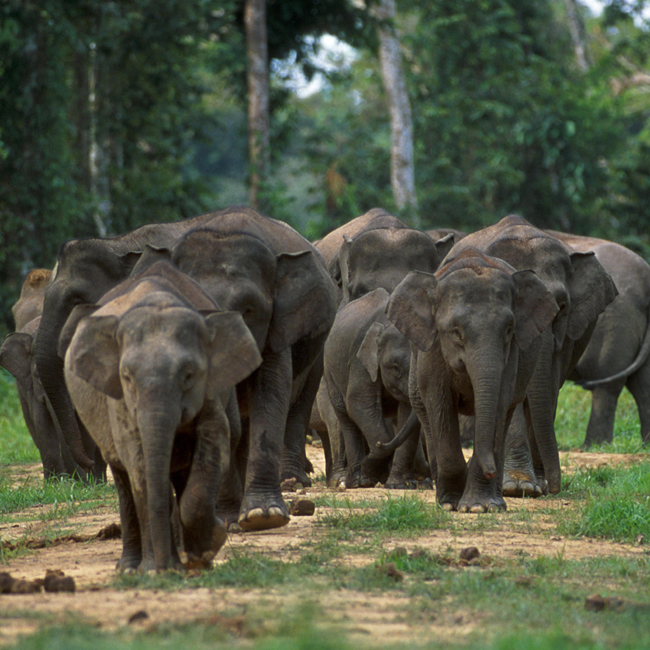
Herd

Elephas maximus is listed on CITES Appendix I. The genetic distinctiveness of Borneo elephants makes them one of the highest priority populations for Asian elephant conservation.

In Malaysia, the Borneo elephant is protected under Schedule II of the Wildlife Conservation Enactment. Any person found guilty of hunting elephants is liable on conviction to a fine of $RM 50,000 or five years imprisonment or both.

=== In captivity ===
The Oregon Zoo keeps a rescued female Borneo elephant named Chendra. She was found wandering alone near a palm oil plantation and had wounds on her front legs and her left eye from gunshots. She was ultimately left blind in that eye and was rehomed to the Oregon Zoo in November 1999.

In 2016, a Japanese zoo also kept a rescued Borneo elephant.

== Taxonomic history ==
It has not been resolved whether Borneo elephants are indigenous or have descended from captive elephants presented to the Sultan of Sulu in 1750 by the East India Company and later set free in northern Borneo.

In the 19th century, a zoological exploration established that wild elephants occurred naturally in a restricted region of northeastern Borneo. The status and taxonomic distinctiveness of the Borneo elephants has been controversial since then. In 1940, Frederick Nutter Chasen considered Bornean elephants as descendants of an introduced stock, and placed them in the subspecies Elephas maximus indicus. Reginald Innes Pocock having studied specimens in the British Museum of Natural History disagreed in 1943 and placed all Sundaic elephants in the subspecies Elephas maximus sumatrensis. In 1950, Paules Edward Pieris Deraniyagala described a subspecies Elephas maximus borneensis, taking as his type an illustration in the National Geographical Magazine.

In 2003, the debate was reopened by a suggestion that the introduced Sulu elephants and the northeastern Borneo population might have descended from the now-extinct Javan elephant, which was named Elephas maximus sondaicus by Deraniyagala. This hypothesis is based on missing archaeological evidence of long-term elephant habitation in Borneo, a corroboration in folklore and that elephants have not colonized the entire island of Borneo.

In 2003, mitochondrial DNA analysis and microsatellite data indicated that the extant population is derived from Sundaic stock, but has undergone independent local evolution for some 300,000 years since a postulated Pleistocene colonization, and possibly became isolated from other Asian elephant populations when land bridges that linked Borneo with the other Sunda Islands and the Asian mainland disappeared after the Last Glacial Maximum 18,000 years ago.

== History ==
Elephants were appropriate gifts from one ruler to another, or to a person of high standing, and it was customary to transport them by sea. In about 1395, the Raja of Java gave two elephants to the ruler Raja Baginda of Sulu. These animals were reputedly the founders of a feral population at the western end of Borneo. When in 1521 the remnants of Ferdinand Magellan's circumnavigation of the Earth reached Brunei, the chronicler of the voyage recounted that the delegation from the flagship Victoria was conveyed to and from the ruler's palace on elephants caparisoned in silk. This custom had been discontinued by the time later visitors arrived in Brunei in the 1770s, who reported wild-living elephant herds that were hunted by local people after harvest. Despite the early records of royal elephants in Brunei and Banjarmasin, there was no tradition of capturing and taming local wild elephants in Borneo.

The arrival of elephants in the northern Kalimantan region of Borneo coincides with the rule of the Sultans of Sulu over Sabah. The Sultanate of Sulu enjoyed peaceful ties with the Hindu Empire of Java. As a token of appreciation, the rulers of Java sent their elephants to Sulu, much as they had sent Javan elephants to the Sultanate of Maguindanao, which also partly gives the reason why skeletal remains of small elephants are found in Mindanao, south Philippines. The Sultan of Sulu and his family shipped some of their prized Javan elephants to northeast Borneo due to a lack of land and for the elephants to help in hauling logs out of the forest to create fast and long ships. When this lease was signed, most of these timid and largely domesticated small elephants under the employ of Sulu's shipbuilders and traders were released into the forests so they could live deep inside the jungle away from any feuding sultan who might use them for war. This single act of releasing the pachyderms to the wild made the Bolkiah family of Sulu and their allies the savior of what remaining elephants are left, old locals attest.

In a study, they compared DNA and diversity to Asian elephant populations, and later came to the conclusion that Borneo elephants split from other Elepha subspecies about 300,000 years ago. They confirmed that Borneo elephants have low genetic diversity but followed a Pleistocene colonization.

== See also ==
- Insular dwarfism
- Kallana
