= Chendra =

Asian elephant at the Oregon Zoo in Portland, Oregon, U.S.

- Species: Asian elephant
- Breed: Borneo elephant
- Sex: Female
- Born: 1993 (est); Borneo
- Residence: Oregon Zoo
- Mate: Samson or Samudra
- Appearance: Wounds on front left leg and eye (blinded)

Chendra is an Asian elephant at the Oregon Zoo in Portland, Oregon, United States. She is originally from Borneo and was acquired by the zoo in November 1999. She has been blind in her left eye since she was young.

Chendra is the only Borneo elephant (a subspecies of Asian elephant) in North America.

In 2019, the zoo announced she was pregnant. However, she had a miscarriage.

Chendra was 31 years old in 2025, or was possibly born in 1993.

== See also ==
- List of individual elephants
