= Packy mural =

Former outdoor mural in Portland, Oregon, U.S.

- The mural being demolished in 2008
- Artist: Eric Larsen
- Year: 1990
- Type: Mural
- Subject: Packy
- Location: Portland, Oregon, United States; 45.52283°N 122.67081°W

The Packy mural was a public artwork depicting the elephant Packy, painted on the Skidmore Fountain Building in Portland, Oregon's Old Town Chinatown neighborhood. The artwork was designed by Eric Larsen and painted in 1990 by North Pacific Sign and Design, but was destroyed during the building's 2008 renovation to become the new headquarters for Mercy Corps.

The mural received a generally positive reception, though in 1997 the president of the company that owned the building expressed his desire to replace the artwork, which he considered a free advertisement for the Oregon Zoo. He wanted to replace it with an illustration that promoted the Old Town Chinatown neighborhood. His search was met with resistance by building tenants, particularly employees of the advertising agency Young and Roehr, who began displaying "Save Packy" signs and campaigning for the art's preservation.

== Description and history ==
The mural was designed by commercial artist Eric Larsen, who created the piece after winning a competition. It was painted on the north wall of the Skidmore Fountain Building (also known as the Reed Building and Packer-Scott Building) in 1990 by North Pacific Sign and Design. The artwork depicted Packy (born at the Oregon Zoo on April 14, 1962), an Asian elephant who was the first elephant born in the Western Hemisphere in 44 years. Co-sponsors of the artwork included Gango Gallery, the Oregon Zoo, and Security Pacific Bank.

In 1997, Mike Hashem, who served as president of Skidmore Management Corporation—the owner of the Skidmore Fountain Building—expressed his desire to replace the mural. He said the artwork served as a free advertisement for the Oregon Zoo, and should be replaced with something that promoted the Old Town Chinatown neighborhood. The Historic Preservation League of Oregon (now Restore Oregon) and the State Historic Preservation Office of the Oregon Parks and Recreation Department raised no concerns about the mural's removal, since the artwork was not designated as an official city landmark or recognized as having historic significance. The league's development coordinator said, "We can't say that you can't do anything to a sign. Traditionally, people kept advertising new products. Who is to say the way it is today is the way it should be frozen?" A planner with the Portland Bureau of Planning, however, said that local sign regulations prevented the mural, which the agency considered a "painted wall decoration", from being replaced by a private advertisement of the same size, but that it could be replaced with another mural.

Building tenants, particularly those who worked for the advertising agency Young and Roehr, began displaying "Save Packy" signs and campaigning for the mural's preservation. Young and Roehr reportedly offered to fund the artwork's refurbishment. Hashem said he also received offers from other potential advertisers, and claimed the 3,000-square-foot (280 m^{2}) space was worth $2,000 per month. Hashem estimated that repainting the mural would cost $5,000–8,000. One owner of North Pacific Sign and Design, who had painted the mural with his father, brother, and two assistants, said the work could be cleaned and "touched up" for significantly less. Larsen was flattered by peoples' positive reaction to the artwork, but was indifferent about the mural's future. He told The Oregonian, "People usually look at my work for about five seconds. I'm not emotionally attached to any of it."

In April 2002, citywide celebrations for Packy's fortieth birthday raised money to restore the faded mural. In addition, the mural has been used as an example of a decorative outdoor wall painting in articles about the city's sign regulations.

=== Destruction ===
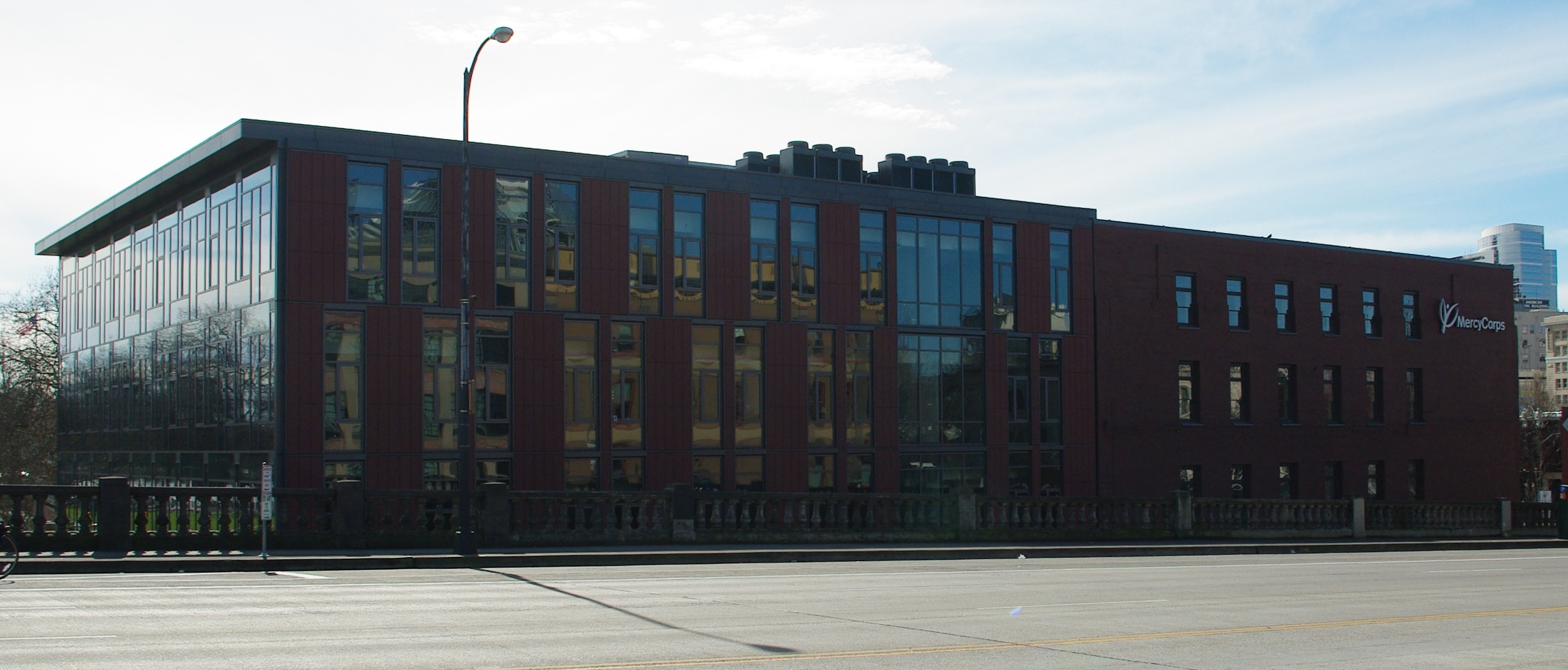
The renovated headquarters for Mercy Corps in 2011

In 2008, the mural was destroyed during the building's renovation to become the new headquarters for Mercy Corps. The top part of the artwork was painted on the building's uppermost floor, which had a stucco exterior and was removed to restore the building to its historic state. Windows were also installed along the wall on which the mural was painted. Mercy Corps planned to "pay tribute to the mural" in the updated building's ground floor. A spokesperson for the organization confirmed that they consulted with the mural's artist and the Oregon Zoo, the neighborhood association, and the Regional Arts & Culture Council. She said:

We understand that it is an important part of the neighborhood's history. ... We're renovating the Skidmore Fountain Building to its historic condition. That means that the mural begins to come down. And then additionally, we have to restore the condition of the brick, which is crumbling and disintegrating and eventually would become unstable. ... Historically, a lot of it had been warehouse space and didn't need windows, but we're going to utilize all the square footage for our offices. ... We have documents of the mural in its condition since we've taken ownership of the building and we've talked to the zoo, which has some of the original photographs.

== Reception ==
The Oregonian's Sura Rubinstein said of the mural's public reception: "Some see a charming tribute to an elephant who's captivated the heart of the city since 1962. ... Some see a painting that's become an integral part of the city's landscape. ... " In 1997, when the mural's fate was uncertain, the Oregon Zoo's marketing manager said, "It was hoped the mural itself would become something of a landmark. A lot of people love it."

== See also ==
- 1990 in art
- Art destruction
- Cultural depictions of elephants
- Da Tung and Xi'an Bao Bao (2002), bronze sculpture in Portland's North Park Blocks
- List of public art in Portland, Oregon
