= Rose-Tu =

Asian elephant at the Oregon Zoo in Portland, Oregon, U.S.

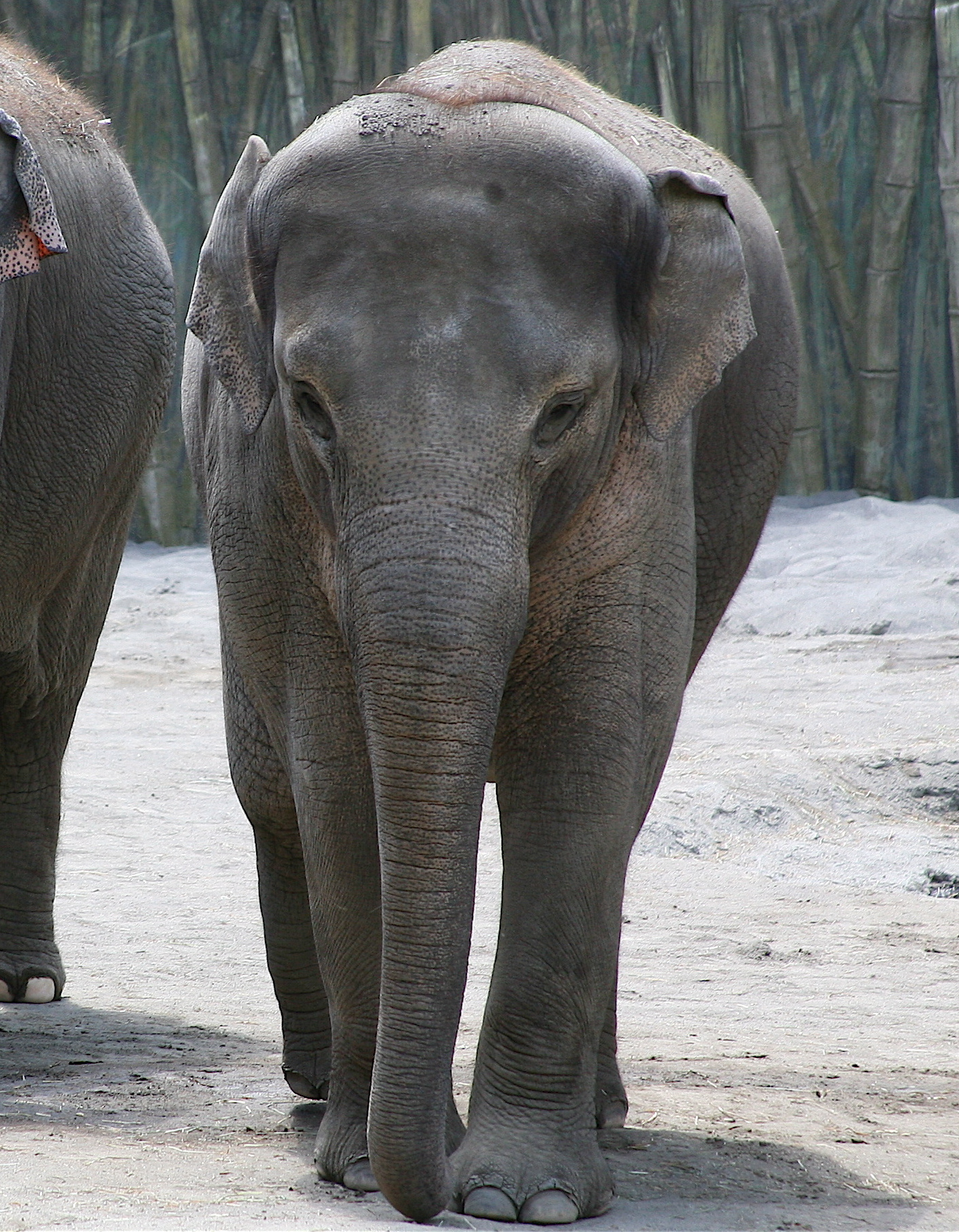
- Rose-Tu at the Oregon Zoo in 2007
- Species: Asian elephant
- Born: August 31, 1994
- Residence: Oregon Zoo (Portland, Oregon)
- Parents: Me-Tu; Hugo
- Offspring: Samudra (b. 2008) Lily (b. 2012 – d. 2018) Tula-Tu (b. 2025)

Rose-Tu (born August 31, 1994) is an Asian elephant at the Oregon Zoo in Portland, Oregon, United States. In April 2000, her keeper repeatedly struck her with his bullhook, and an exam shortly after the incident found 176 lacertions and puncture wounds on Rose-Tu. As a result, the keeper was dismissed from his position, convicted of second-degree animal abuse, and the Oregon Zoo was fined by the U.S. Department of Agriculture. Due to delays in prosecution, the Oregon Senate approved a bill that redefined animal cruelty laws in Oregon to allow evidence of physical wounds to be sufficient to prove animal abuse, a change from earlier laws that required that proof of "impairment of the physical condition or substantial pain".

Rose-Tu has had three offspring: a son, Samudra, in 2008, and two daughters, Lily and Tula-Tu in 2012 and 2025. Lily died in 2018 from elephant endotheliotropic herpesvirus.

== History ==
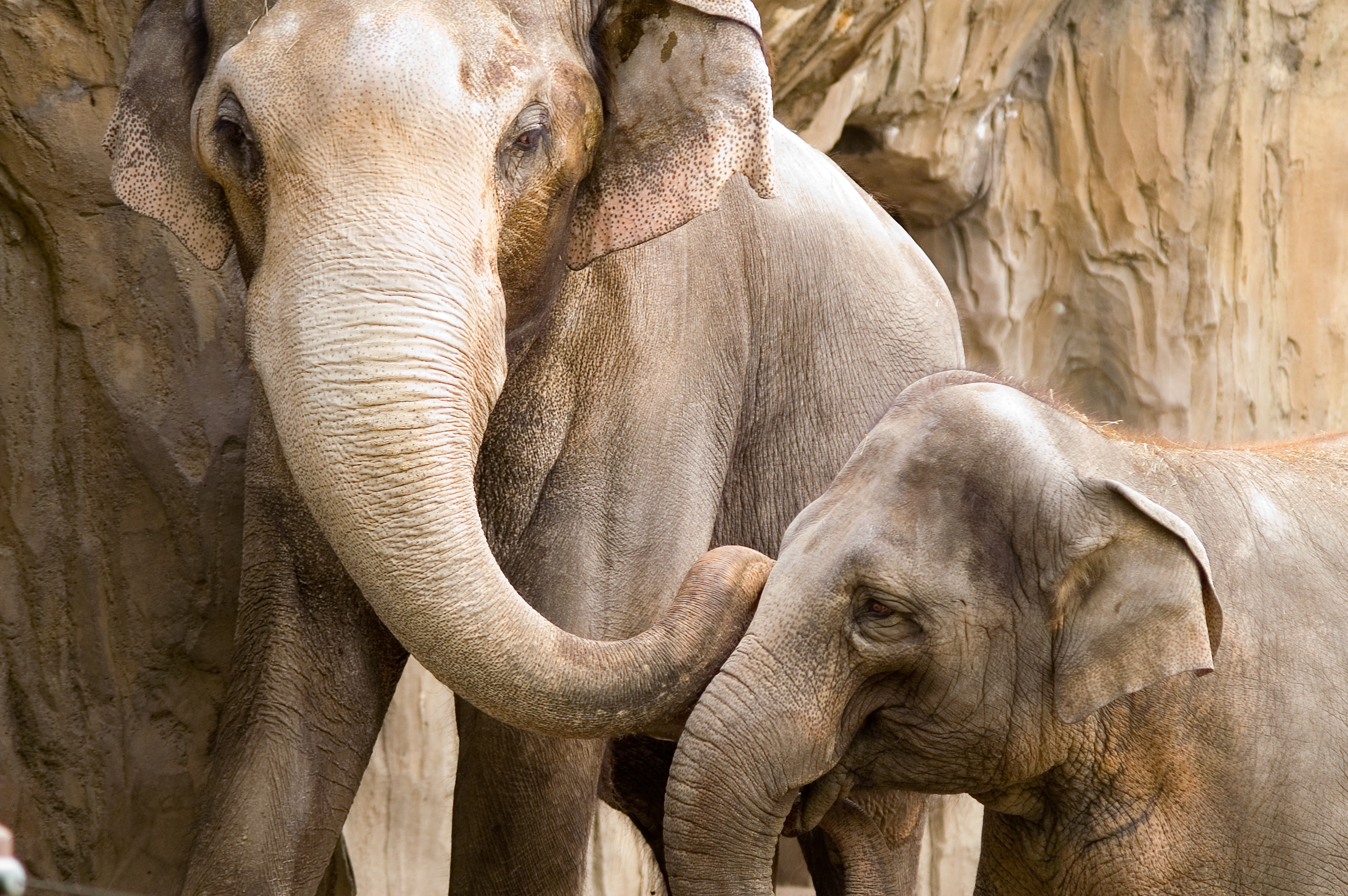
Packy (left) and Rose-Tu (right) at the Oregon Zoo

=== Early life ===
Rose-Tu was born on August 31, 1994, to mother Me-Tu, the half-sister of Packy. Her father Hugo was wild-born. Rose-Tu was one of twins, but her unnamed sibling died within an hour of its birth. Rose-Tu was approximately 3 feet (0.91 m) tall and weighed 180 pounds (82 kg) at birth, forty pounds lower than average. Her name was taken partially from her mother, partially in homage to Portland's nickname "City of Roses", and partially after her grandmother, a wild-born elephant whose name was Rosy (the first elephant ever to live in Oregon). Other shortlisted names included Asha, Jordan, Koofed, and Song.

Rose-Tu was raised with the other female elephants at Oregon Zoo, particularly her mother, Sung-Surin, and Belle, the mother of Packy, In 1996, Me-Tu was euthanized due to foot rot. Belle was euthanized for similar reasons the following year. Rose-Tu was allowed to visit her body shortly after the procedure.

In January 2000, the Oregon Zoo revised its policies on the use of bullhooks to mandate that the keepers use the hooks only with one hand. This decision came after a member of the public lodged a complaint with the Multnomah County Animal Control, alleging that they had seen a keeper hit Rose-Tu with a hook. The zoo and keeper were cleared of all charges, and the zoo's animal collection manager said that he supported the keeper's handling of the elephants.

=== April 2000 abuse incident ===
On April 17, 2000, when Rose-Tu was five years old, Rose-Tu's keeper ordered her to move to a different part of the enclosure. When she did not, the keeper struck Rose-Tu repeatedly with a bullhook, which was also inserted into Rose-Tu's anus. An examination by another keeper after the incident identified 176 lacerations and puncture wounds on Rose-Tu, but an exam by a veterinarian was not performed until April 19. The keeper was fired by the zoo, which he appealed. In a discipline hearing, he confirmed that he had used his own bullhook, not one provided by the zoo.

Initially, the district attorney declined to charge the keeper because Rose-Tu, being an elephant, could not testify as to whether she felt pain during the incident. The prosecutors eventually decided to use expert witnesses to testify that Rose-Tu had experienced pain, and the keeper pled no-contest to charges of second-degree animal abuse. In response to the initial decisions by the prosecutor, the Animal Legal Defense Fund wrote a bill, sponsored by state senator Ryan Deckert, which proposed lowering the standard of evidence needed to prove animal abuse in cases concerning domestic animals, but not with those related to "livestock, animal husbandry, or veterinary practices". The proposed law, Oregon Senate Bill 230, passed in 2001. It redefined the law in Oregon to classify evidence of physical trauma, not evidence of pain, as sufficient to prove animal abuse. Previously, the law had mandated prosecutors show either "impairment of the physical condition or substantial pain". The bill also made aggravated animal neglect in the first degree and prohibited the ownership of pets for five years after certain animal-abuse convictions.

As a result of the incident, the Oregon Zoo was fined $10,000 by the U.S Department of Agriculture, $5,000 of which was to be put aside to hire experts to review the zoo's elephant program. They also had to agree not to re-hire the former zookeeper. Additionally, the use of bullhooks and other physical hands-on forms of elephants management was revisited by the industry in light of the widespread negative attention the incident experienced.

== Family ==
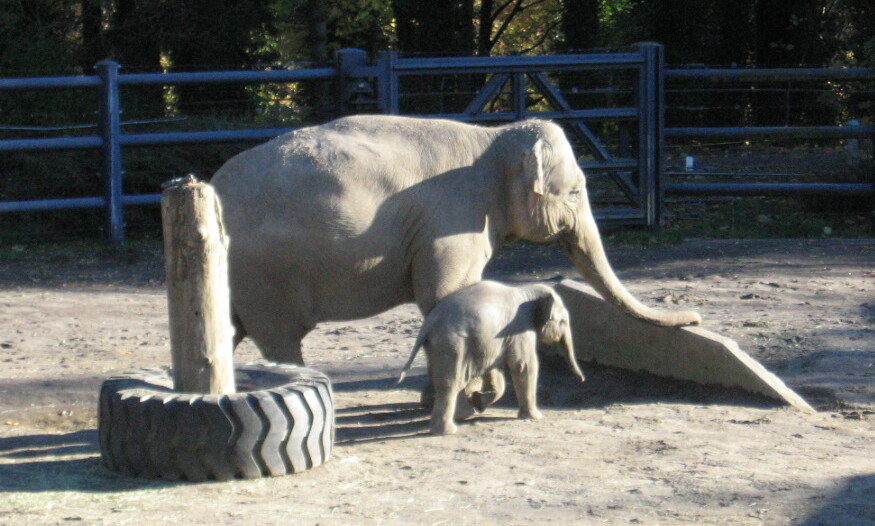
Rose-Tu with calf Samudra, 2008

Rose-Tu gave birth to a 286 lb (130 kg) male calf named Samudra on August 23, 2008. Samudra was the first third-generation elephant to be born in the U.S. His father was Tusko, a male elephant who had been loaned to Oregon Zoo in 2005. In the lead-up to Samudra's birth, zookeepers expressed concerns that none of the three cows at the zoo had previous experience as a mother. After his birth, Rose-Tu trampled on him and he was removed temporarily.

Rose-Tu was mated again with Tusko and, in 2012, gave birth to a 300 lb (140 kg) female calf named Lily. Her name was chosen in an online poll. Shortly after Lily's birth, The Seattle Times reported that Lily, like her father, was owned, not by the Oregon Zoo, but by private elephant ranch Have Trunk Will Travel and that she could be removed from the zoo when she turned three. This was as a result of the agreement the Oregon Zoo made when they were loaned Tusko, where it was stipulated that half of Tusko's offspring would go to the zoo, and the other half to the ranch. Animal Defenders International and Bob Barker called for the zoo to keep Lily. In 2013, the Oregon Zoo purchased both Lily and Tusko for $400,000 from Have Trunk Will Travel. Photographs of Rose-Tu and Lily were featured prominently in Elephant House, a 2015 photo book about the lives of elephants at the Oregon Zoo. On November 28, 2018, Lily was diagnosed with elephant endotheliotropic herpesvirus. She started showing symptoms the next day, and died on late on November 29, 2018, one day before turning six.

Rose-Tu's third pregnancy, this time with the then twenty-five year old Samson, was announced in November 2023. She gave birth to Tula-Tu on February 1, 2025. During a segment on Today, Jenna Bush Hager called Tula-Tu "the cutest animal of 2025". Tula-Tu made her public debut on February 21 and that summer was selected as the grand marshal of the Portland Rose Festival's Grand Floral Parade.

== See also ==
- List of individual elephants
- Gita, an elephant whose death was investigated by the United States Department of Agriculture
- Ziggy, an elephant kept confined for nearly thirty years
