= Da Tung and Xi'an Bao Bao =

Sculpture in Portland, Oregon, U.S.

- The sculpture in 2017
- Artist: Unknown
- Year: 2002
- Type: Sculpture
- Medium: Bronze
- Subject: Two elephants
- Dimensions: 3.4 m × 2.0 m × 4.3 m (135 in × 77 in × 168 in)
- Location: Portland, Oregon, United States; 45°31′24″N 122°40′44″W
- Owner: City of Portland and Multnomah County Public Art Collection courtesy of the Regional Arts & Culture Council

Da Tung and Xi'an Bao Bao ("Universal Peace and Baby Elephant" in English), is an outdoor 2002 bronze sculpture, located at the North Park Blocks in downtown Portland, Oregon, United States. The sculptor is unknown. It is part of the City of Portland and Multnomah County Public Art Collection courtesy of the Regional Arts & Culture Council.

== Description ==
The bronze sculpture, installed in 2002 at the intersection of Northwest Park Avenue and West Burnside Street in the North Park Blocks, was fabricated by the Five Rings Bronze Foundry in Xi'an, China. It measures 135 inches (3.4 m) x 77 inches (2.0 m) x 168 inches (4.3 m) and depicts a young, smaller elephant on top of an adult, larger elephant. The work's name has two parts: "Da Tung", which can be translated as "universal peace" or "large bronze", and "Xi'an Bao Bao", which means "baby elephant".

The replica, donated by Huo Baozhu, was inspired by a wine pitcher from the late Shang dynasty (circa 1200–1100 BC) and is approximately sixteen times larger than the original. The elephants are similar in appearance and have their trunks raised. Their surfaces are decorated with small cloud-shaped patterns and animals from ancient Chinese mythology.

The young elephant stands "peacefully on his father's back", symbolizing "safe and prosperous offspring". The Regional Arts & Culture Council, which administers the sculpture, described it as: "Playful. Blends into the environment with nods to the diversity in generations, activities and cultures." The piece is part of the City of Portland and Multnomah County Public Art Collection courtesy of the Regional Arts & Culture Council.

== See also ==
- 2002 in art
- Cultural depictions of elephants
- Elephants in ancient China
- History of Chinese Americans in Portland, Oregon
- Packy mural (1990–2008), a mural in Portland depicting Packy
