= Zawadi Mungu =

Lion at Oregon Zoo (2007 – 2026)

- Sex: Male
- Died: Oregon Zoo, Portland, Oregon, U.S.

Zawadi Mungu was a lion at the Oregon Zoo in Portland, Oregon, United States. He was born at the San Diego Zoo Safari Park in 2007 and relocated to Oregon in 2009. He died in 2026, at the age of 18. He was among the oldest male lions in North America at the time. Two of his cubs (Niara and Mashavu) remain at the Oregon Zoo. He has other offspring elsewhere.

He was named Father of the Year by the Oregon Zoo in 2014. In 2016, his tail was severed by a hydraulic door. He weighed approximately 500 lbs. in 2019. Prior to his death, the zoo added ramps to the lion habitat to help with his mobility.
