= The Continuity of Life Forms =

Mosaic at the Oregon Zoo, Portland, Oregon

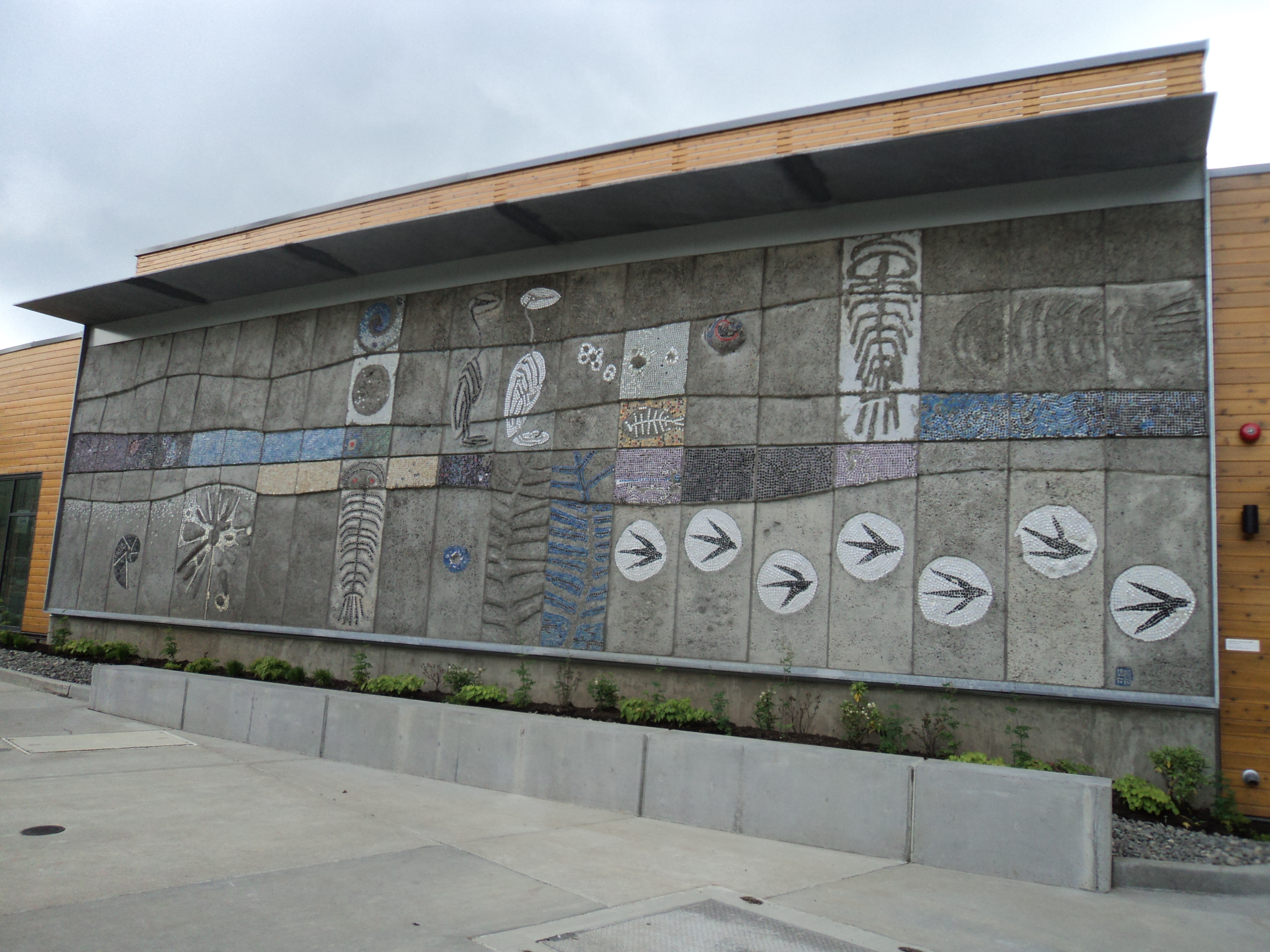
- The mosaic in 2017
- Artist: Willard Martin
- Year: 1959
- Type: Mosaic
- Dimensions: 4.6 m × 18 m (15 ft × 60 ft)
- Location: Oregon Zoo; Portland, Oregon, United States; 45°30′31.2″N 122°42′57.7″W

The Continuity of Life Forms is a mosaic by Willard Martin, installed at the Oregon Zoo in Portland, Oregon.

== Description and history ==
The Continuity of Life Forms is a large mid-century modern mosaic and one of the earliest remaining works by local architect and artist Willard "Will" Martin, who also designed Pioneer Courthouse Square. It is made of 20 panels and measures approximately 15 feet (4.6 m) tall and 60 feet (18 m) wide. The work has been installed in two locations at the Oregon Zoo. According to the organization, The Continuity of Life Forms "[captures] a panoramic sense of history and being — the forces of life — out of footprints, seeds, leaves, shells, fossils and primitive life forms that might be found in the Earth's strata".

The mosaic was originally installed at the zoo's entrance in 1959, when the zoo moved to its current location. In 1997, the zoo's entrance was relocated, and the mosaic became less visible, obstructed by a fence and out of the way for visitor access. In 2014, during construction of the zoo's conservation education center, the mosaic was removed and placed into storage. During its 2014–2015 fiscal year, the Oregon Cultural Trust granted $20,000 to the Oregon Zoo Foundation for the mosaic's conservation and restoration. The funds allowed the Oregon Zoo Foundation to hire an art conservator and restoration artist to "ensure the accurate restoration and conservation of this splendid artwork for future generations". Additional funding was provided by the Oregon Zoo Foundation's Education Campaign, which raised more than $1.5 million for the center and educational programming.

The Continuity of Life Forms was re-installed at the conservation education center's entrance, near the zoo's former main entrance, in July 2016. One of the zoo's project managers said of the mosaic's current location, "We want the zoo to serve as a gateway experience to what may become a deeper relationship with the natural world. So bringing 'The Continuity of Life Forms' back at this same location is ideal." The organization hopes the re-installation will introduce another generation to the artwork and Martin, who died in a plane crash in 1985.

== See also ==
- 1959 in art
