= Kallana =

Claimed to be a species of dwarf elephant in Kerala, India

Creature information
- Other name: Thumpiyana
- Sub grouping: Elephas

Origin
- Country: India
- Region: Southern part of Western Ghats
- Habitat: Mountainous Rain forest

Kallana is a suspected species of dwarf elephant allegedly found in South India. Kaani tribals dwelling in the rainforests of the Western Ghats (Kerala, India) claim that there are two distinct varieties of elephants in the Peppara forest range, one the common Indian elephants (Elephas maximus indicus), and the other a dwarf variety which they call kallana. The name kallana comes from the words "kallu", which means stones or boulders, and "aana", which means elephant. The tribals gave the creatures this name because they see the smaller elephant more often in the higher altitudes where the terrain is rocky. Some tribals also call the delicate creatures thumbiana (thumbi means dragonfly) for the speed with which the pachyderms run through trees and rocks when disturbed.

== Behaviour and diet ==
According to the Kani tribals, the pygmy elephants feed on grass, bamboo leaves, tubers and the barks of smaller trees. Like all elephants, they enjoy bathing in rivers and they too have dust baths. Unlike larger elephants, however, they seem able to negotiate steep, rocky inclines.

== Sightings and claims of existence as a distinct species ==
The existence of a pygmy variety of elephant in India is yet to be scientifically ascertained. If the claims of Kaani tribals are believed there are ample reasons to believe that the "kallana" they describe is a different (namely pygmy) variety of elephant since it is claimed to grow to a maximum height of 5 feet (1.5 metres), and they do not mix with the more common Indian elephants, even taking pains to avoid them. In all other respects, they look like Indian elephants. Sali Palode, a Kerala-based wildlife photographer, and Mallan Kani, a member of Kerala's Kaani tribe, who were in search of this elusive elephant were able to photograph one such dwarf elephant, and even claim to have seen a herd.

On 17 March 2010, the same Mallan Kani guided the photographer Benny Ajantha to a kallana and he took pictures. This was reported in the Malayalam daily Malayala Manorama with a picture, but one needs to be captured and tested to see whether it is a separate species. The Kerala Forest Department has recently deputed search teams to the forests of Agasthyavanam, Neyyar and the Peppara Wildlife Sanctuaries to search for the pygmy elephants.

Video footage by Sali Palode and Dr Kamaruddheen attained media attention as well as government officials in studying about this, to confirm whether this is a new species. Some of the criticisms from experts is that all the sightings have been of solitary animals. This could be a sign of genetic aberration rather than a separate species. In 2013, a dwarf individual belonging to Elephas maximus was observed in Udawalawe National Park in southern Sri Lanka and scientifically documented.
