= Packy (elephant) =

Asian elephant at the Oregon Zoo

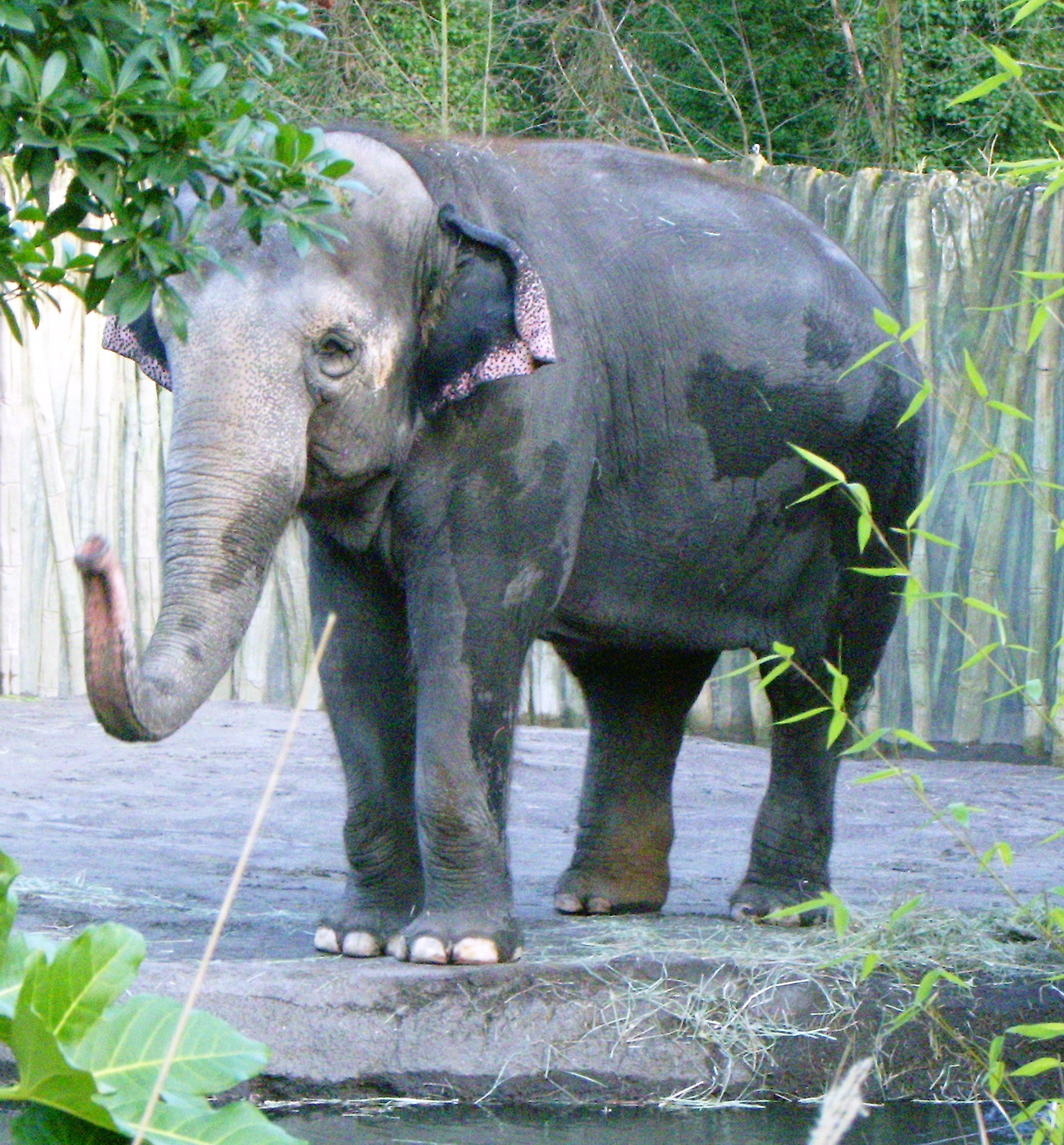
- One of the elephants at the Oregon Zoo in 2006
- Species: Elephas maximus
- Breed: Asiatic Elephant
- Sex: Male
- Born: April 14, 1962; Oregon Zoo, Portland, Oregon
- Died: February 9, 2017 (aged 54); Portland, Oregon
- Known for: First elephant born in the Western Hemisphere in 44 years.
- Owner: Oregon Zoo
- Weight: 14,530 lb (6,591 kg)
- Named after: Pachyderm

Packy (April 14, 1962 – February 9, 2017) was an Asian elephant at the Oregon Zoo (Portland Zoological Gardens at the time of his birth) in Portland, Oregon, United States. He was famous for having been the first elephant born in the Western Hemisphere in 44 years. At the time of his death, he was the oldest male Asian elephant in North America. With a shoulder height of 10 feet 6 inches (3.20 m) and overall height of more than 12 feet (3.7 m) when standing up straight, Packy was also one of the tallest elephants in the United States and perhaps one of the tallest worldwide.

== History ==
Packy's mother, Belle, was wild-born in Thailand, around 1952. His father, Thonglaw, was born in Cambodia around 1947. Both were captured and brought to Morgan Berry, an elephant trainer in Seattle, Washington, in 1959. Belle became pregnant with Packy on July 19, 1960, at the Woodland Park Zoo. This went undiscovered for a year. Meanwhile, both 8-year-old Belle and 13-year-old Thonglaw, along with Berry's other female, 5-year-old Pet, were being transferred between Seattle and Portland every year. In December 1961, the staff at what was then the Portland Zoo confirmed Belle's pregnancy, although they decided not to tell the public until she gave birth. In January 1962, Belle went into false labor, so zoo staff decided to release the news to the public. Portlanders learned of the pregnancy through an Oregonian article, and citizens eagerly anticipated the birth. Then, late at night on April 13, Belle entered labor. On April 14, 1962, at 5:58 a.m., after 21 months of pregnancy and five hours of labor, Belle gave birth to a male calf. Ten days later, following a naming contest sponsored by a local radio station, he was named "Packy". The then-very-rare elephant birth received international media attention, and Life magazine devoted 11 pages to Packy in its issue of May 11, 1962. Visitors from all over the world came to Portland to see the famous baby elephant. The Portland Zoo set an attendance record in 1962, of more than 1 million visitors, a figure that remained unmatched until 27 years later (1989).

Several circuses and zoos wanted to buy Belle and Packy, but their trainer, Morgan Berry, declined all offers, except for Portland's. After Portlanders raised enough money –$30,000 in donations – and made the purchase, Berry donated Thonglaw and Pet to keep the herd intact.

Meanwhile, Thonglaw had also impregnated Pet, as well as Portland's own two females, Rosy and Tuy Hoa. On October 3, 1962, Rosy gave birth to a female, named Me-Tu. On September 15 of the following year, Pet gave birth to a male called Dino, and on September 24, Tuy Hoa gave birth to a female called Hanako.

Of Packy's parents, Thonglaw died on November 25, 1974 (age 27), from a drug reaction to anesthesia. He sired 14 calves besides Packy. Belle died on April 22, 1997 (age 45), of a foot infection. She did not have any other offspring.

== Adulthood ==
At 54 years of age, Packy was the oldest male (or "bull") Asian elephant in North America. In 2012, he weighed about 12,600 pounds (5,715 kg), but also weighed at least 2,000 pounds more at times in the past. In 2008, he weighed 14,530 pounds (6,591 kg).

Packy sired seven calves (only one surviving):

1. Unnamed male calf, born to Packy and Me-Tu on May 10, 1975, at Los Angeles Zoo, died December 2 (6 months).
2. Unnamed female calf, born to Packy and Hanako on February 19, 1976, at Oregon Zoo, died March 5 (2 weeks).
3. Sumek, a female born to Packy and Hanako on March 15, 1978, at Oregon Zoo, died April 29 (6 weeks).
4. Khun-Chorn, a male born to Packy and Me-Tu on May 19, 1978, at Oregon Zoo, transferred to Dickerson Park Zoo in 1980 (age 2), died January 19, 2016 (age 37).
5. Thongtrii, a male born to Packy and Rosy on October 5, 1979, at Oregon Zoo, transferred to Fresno, California in 1981 (age 2), died February 1, 1993 (age 14).
6. Sung-Surin "Shine", a female born to Packy and Pet on December 26, 1982, at Oregon Zoo where she currently lives (age 43).
7. Rama, a male born to Packy and Rosy on April 1, 1983, at Oregon Zoo, where he lived until his death on March 30, 2015 (age 32).

All of Packy's calves' mothers have since passed on. The last being Hanako, Packy's half-sister, who died in 2020 (age 57). Rosy died in 1993, Me-Tu in 1996, and Pet in 2006. Packy's daughter Shine is currently the matriarch of the herd. None of Packy's offspring have had any progeny of their own.

== Packy and Me ==
Packy and Me is the written story of Packy's delivery at the Portland Zoo. The book was written by Dr. Matthew Maberry, the veterinarian who delivered Packy, and was published in 2011. Maberry died in January 2012.

== Health issues and controversy ==
In July 2013, Packy was diagnosed with tuberculosis, following Rama's infection diagnosed in May 2013. Treatment was administered to both the elephants, and while Rama's condition was reported to be improving in April 2014, Packy was not responding well to treatment. The next year, Tusko, a 44-year-old male Asian elephant, was also tested positive for tuberculosis and an 18-month treatment regimen was started, while Packy's condition was not reported to be improving. Rama and Tusko were both euthanized in 2015, leaving Packy to be the sole elephant with tuberculosis at the zoo. Treatment was stopped in 2016 after the regimen was found to be ineffective in treating his disease. Packy had long been the subject of the campaign of the animal welfare groups In Defense of Animals and Free the Oregon Zoo Elephants, who maintain claims that the living conditions in the Oregon Zoo for the elephant herd are insufficient, and demand their release to a sanctuary.

Packy was euthanized on February 9, 2017, following the veterinarians' decision that his tuberculosis was drug-resistant.

== See also ==
- Packy mural
- List of individual elephants
