= Tusko (Oregon Zoo) =

Asian elephant

- Species: Asian elephant
- Sex: Male
- Born: 1971; Thailand
- Died: December 22, 2015 (aged 43–44); Oregon Zoo, Portland, Oregon, U.S.

Tusko (c. 1971 - December 22, 2015) was an Asian elephant who resided at the Oregon Zoo in Portland, Oregon from 2005 until December 2015. It is believed he was born in the wilds of Thailand around 1971, and was about 44 years old by the time of his death.

Tusko arrived at the Oregon Zoo in June 2005 on a breeding loan. He had successfully sired three calves in the past; two while living in Canada and one in California. Tusko had also successfully mated with Rose-Tu, the youngest elephant in the herd at the time. On August 23, 2008, she delivered her first offspring, a male named Samudra and nicknamed Sam. Sam is also the first third-generation elephant born in the United States. Zoo officials have stated that they were very lucky to find a bull like Tusko. He was a good match for the herd, providing genetic diversity as well as great social skills, experience with calves, a gentle nature with the females and positive role model for Samudra.

Rose-Tu and Tusko again mated successfully in 2011 and her second calf, a female named Lily, was born on November 30, 2012. A controversy was sparked when the Seattle Times reported that the new baby would become the property of Perris-based Have Trunk Will Travel, a company which offers elephant rides at fairs, zoos and weddings. Zoo officials explained that although the breeding contract stipulated that the zoo owned the first, third and fifth of Tusko's offspring, while the California company owned the second, fourth and sixth, there were no plans to ship the elephant to California. The plan has always been for Rose-Tu and her baby to stay together their whole lives as they would in the wild; however, the legal details of the arrangement could not be negotiated before the elephant was one month old. Eventually, the Oregon Zoo foundation organized a fundraiser to purchase both Lily and Tusko for $400,000, giving the zoo legal ownership of both.

There were plans for Tusko to also mate with the zoo's other two females, Shine and Chendra, although they never materialized. Tusko underwent two surgeries to have his tusks removed due to risk of chronic infection. He was blind in his right eye.

In June 2014, the elephant tested positive for tuberculosis. An 18-month treatment began that year.

In late December 2015, a decades-old right-rear foot injury flared up, forcing Tusko to use his other three legs and his trunk to bear weight. His right-front foot then became infected and swollen, and Tusko had difficulty standing and walking. He was euthanized on December 22, 2015. Zoo officials said they did not know exactly how the injury occurred, however that it had happened while he was a circus elephant.

== See also ==
- List of individual elephants
- Tusko, circus elephant from Seattle
