= Samudra (elephant) =

Asian elephant at the Oregon Zoo in Portland, Oregon, U.S.

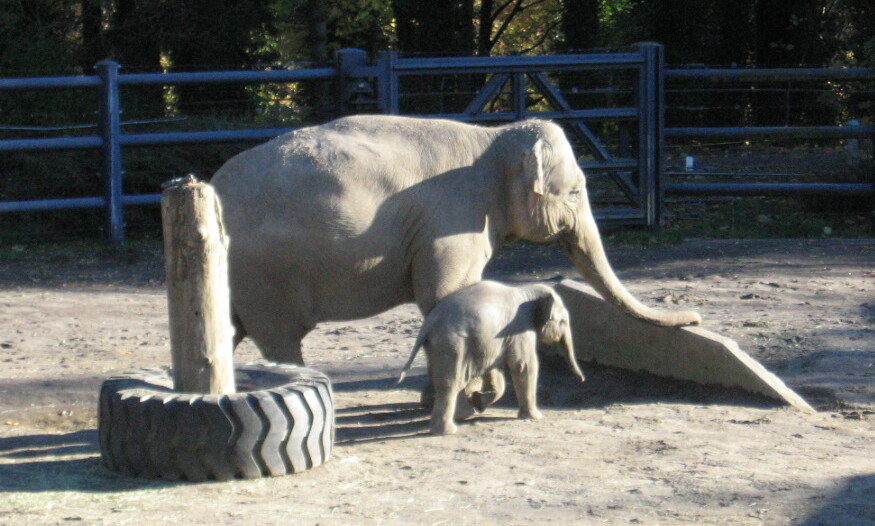
- Samudra and his mother Rose-Tu in 2008
- Species: Asian elephant
- Born: August 23, 2008; Oregon Zoo, Portland, Oregon, U.S.
- Residence: Oregon Zoo
- Parents: Rose-Tu; Tusko

Samudra (also known as "Sam") is an Asian elephant at the Oregon Zoo in Portland, Oregon, United States. He was born to Rose-Tu in 2008. Samudra is the first third-generation elephant born in the U.S. His father was Tusko.

== History ==
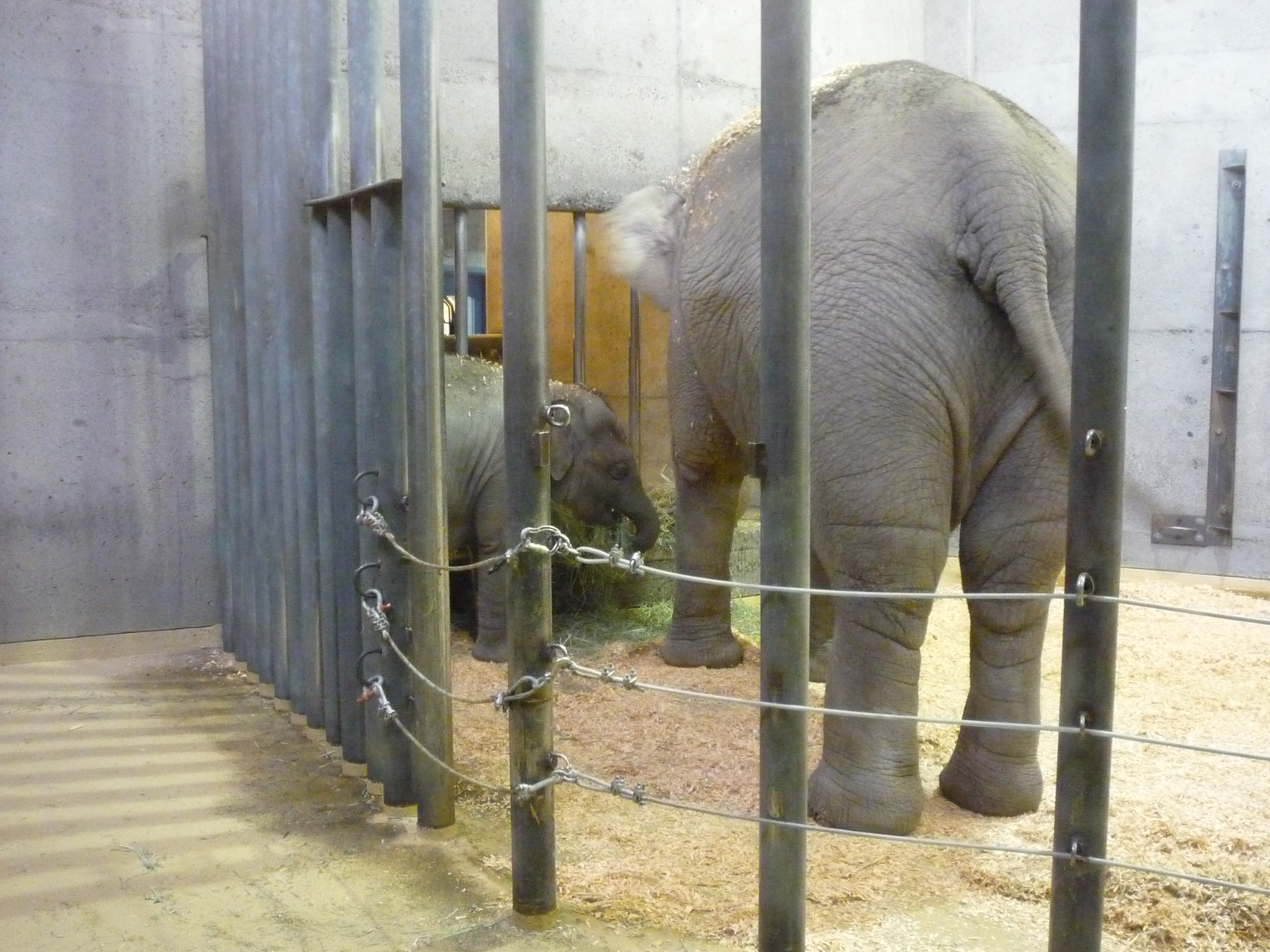
Samudra and Rose-Tu, 2009

Rose-Tu gave birth to Samudra on August 23, 2008. He weighed 286 pounds and his name is the Sanskrit word for "ocean". According to The Oregonian, his name is Hindi for "lord of the ocean". Rose-Tu kicked and stomped on Samudra upon his arrival, but he was uninjured and the pair bonded. Samudra's father was Tusko. Samudra was the first elephant born at the Oregon Zoo since Rose-Tu herself in 1994. He was also the first third-generation elephant born in the U.S. The zoo saw record attendance for the month after he went on exhibit.

Samudra weighed approximately 3,000 pounds in 2011. His sister Lily joined the zoo in 2012; she died in 2018. Tusko began teaching Samudra how to interact with female elephants in 2012. Samudra weighed approximately 10,000 pounds in 2024.

== See also ==
- List of individual elephants
