= Oregon Zoo =

Zoo in Portland, Oregon, United States

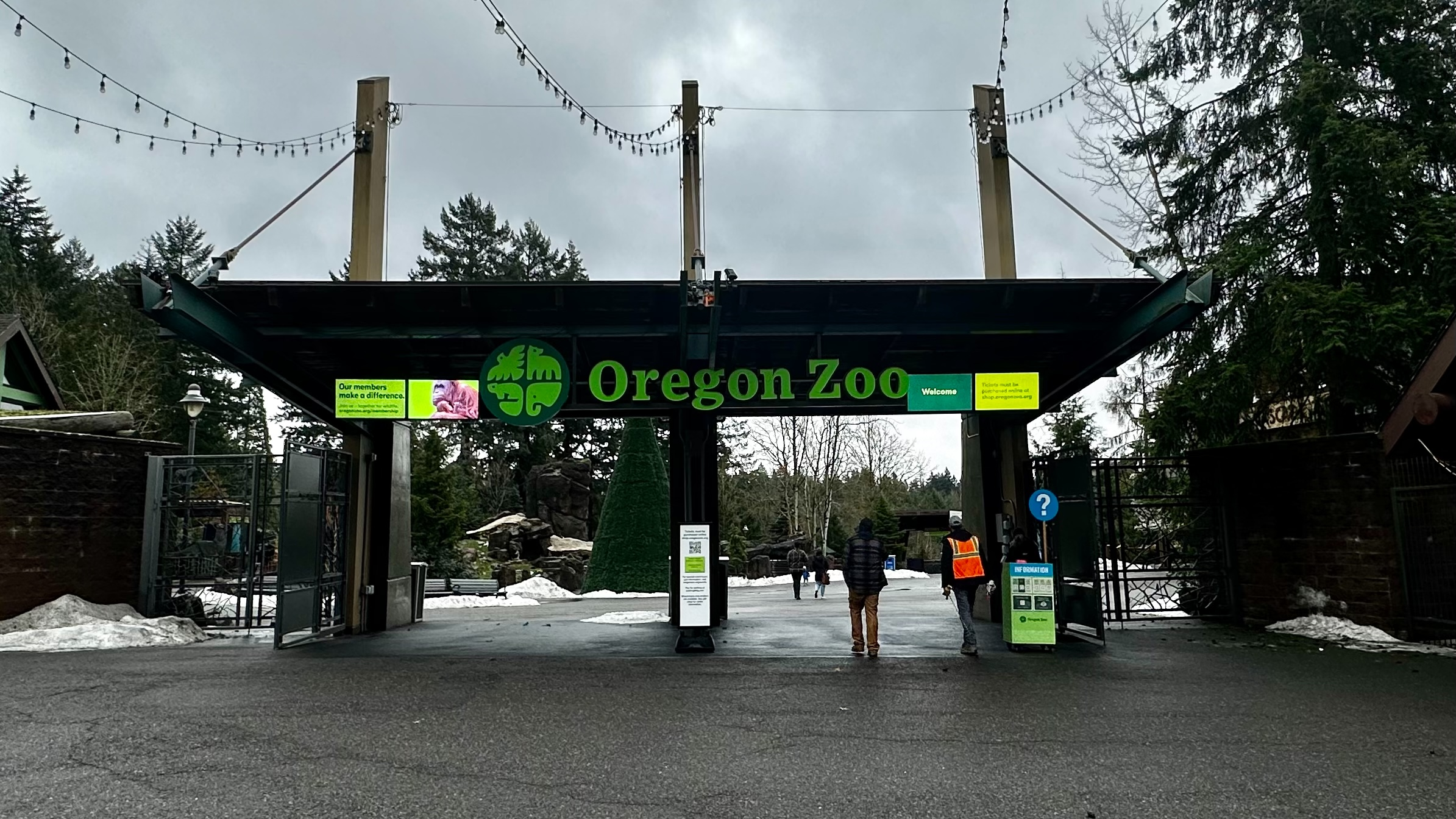
- Main entrance in January 2024
- Interactive map of Oregon Zoo
- 45°30′30″N 122°42′53″W
- Date opened: 1888; 138 years ago
- Location: Washington Park, Portland, Oregon, United States
- Land area: 64 acres (26 ha)
- No. of animals: 1,800
- No. of species: 232
- Annual visitors: 1.7 million
- Memberships: AZA WAZA
- Major exhibits: The Great Northwest, Africa Savanna, Africa Rainforest, Elephant Lands
- Public transit: MAX Light Rail at Washington Park; Bus Service; 63
- Website: www.oregonzoo.org

The Oregon Zoo, originally the Portland Zoo and later the Washington Park Zoo, is a zoo in Portland, Oregon, United States. It is located in Washington Park, approximately 2 miles (3.2 km) southwest of downtown Portland. Founded in 1888, it is the oldest zoo west of the Mississippi River.

The 64-acre (26 ha) zoo is owned by the regional Metro government. It currently holds more than 1,800 animals of more than 230 species, including 19 endangered species and 9 threatened species. The zoo also boasts an extensive plant collection throughout its animal exhibits and specialized gardens. The zoo also operates and maintains the 2 ft 6 in (762 mm) narrow-gauge Washington Park & Zoo Railway that previously connected to the International Rose Test Garden inside the park, but currently runs only within the zoo.

The Oregon Zoo is Oregon's largest paid and arguably most popular visitor attraction, with more than 1.7 million visitors in 2018. The zoo is a member of the Association of Zoos and Aquariums, and the World Association of Zoos and Aquariums.

== History ==
=== Founding ===
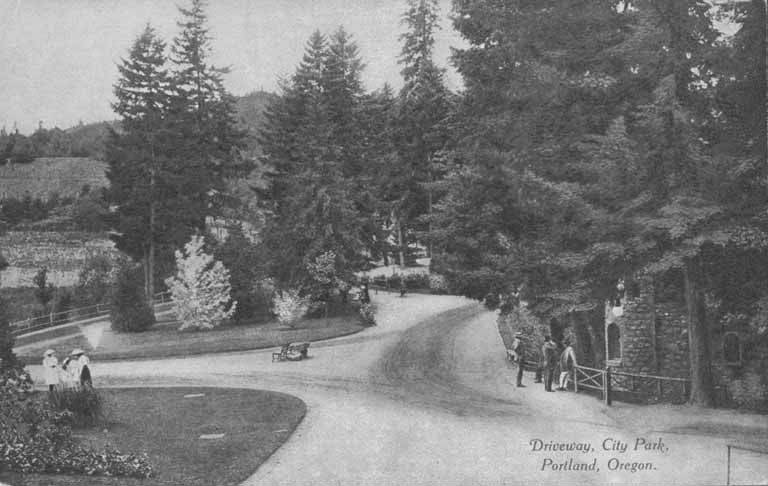
Washington Park was known as City Park until 1909. Charles M. Meyers was the first park keeper and he transformed the wilderness area into a park filled with drives, walkways, gardens, lawns and a zoo.

The Oregon Zoo was founded in 1888, making it the oldest North American zoo west of the Mississippi. It all began with two bears purchased by Richard Knight – one brown bear and one grizzly. A former seaman turned pharmacist, Knight began collecting animals from his seafaring friends. He kept his collection in the back of his drug store on Third & Morrison streets. When caring for the animals became too large a responsibility he sought to sell them to the city of Portland. Instead of buying the animals, the city offered to give Knight two circus cages and allowed him to place the caged bears on the grounds of City Park (now called Washington Park).

Care and feeding of the bears, however, still fell to the Knight family and friends. It was not long before Knight addressed the city council again regarding the bears. Just five months later, he offered to donate the bears, along with their cages, to the city. Portland City Council accepted his offer on November 7, 1888, and thus began the Portland Zoo. Located in Washington Park, it was sometimes referred to as the Washington Park Zoo.

By 1894, there were over 300 animals in the zoo’s collection. In 1925, the zoo moved to the site of the present Portland Japanese Garden, still within Washington Park.

=== Hoyt Park ===
The zoo moved again in 1958–59 to its current site, designed by Lawrence, Tucker & Wallmann. This was located in Hoyt Park, west of Washington Park, but some years later the two parks were combined as Washington Park. At this time, the Portland Zoo Railway was constructed to connect the zoo to its former site in Washington Park and other attractions there. The zoo's move to the new, much larger site was made in stages, over more than a year, with the first animals being moved in spring 1958 and limited public access being opened in June 1958, one day after the first section of the Zoo Railway opened. During the transition period the new zoo was only open on weekends, as most animals were still at the old site awaiting completion of their new enclosures. However, the new railway operated six days a week until mid-September. Meanwhile, the old zoo remained in operation, but in May 1959 was restricted to pedestrian access only, closed to automobile access, for its last months of operation.

=== Washington Park ===
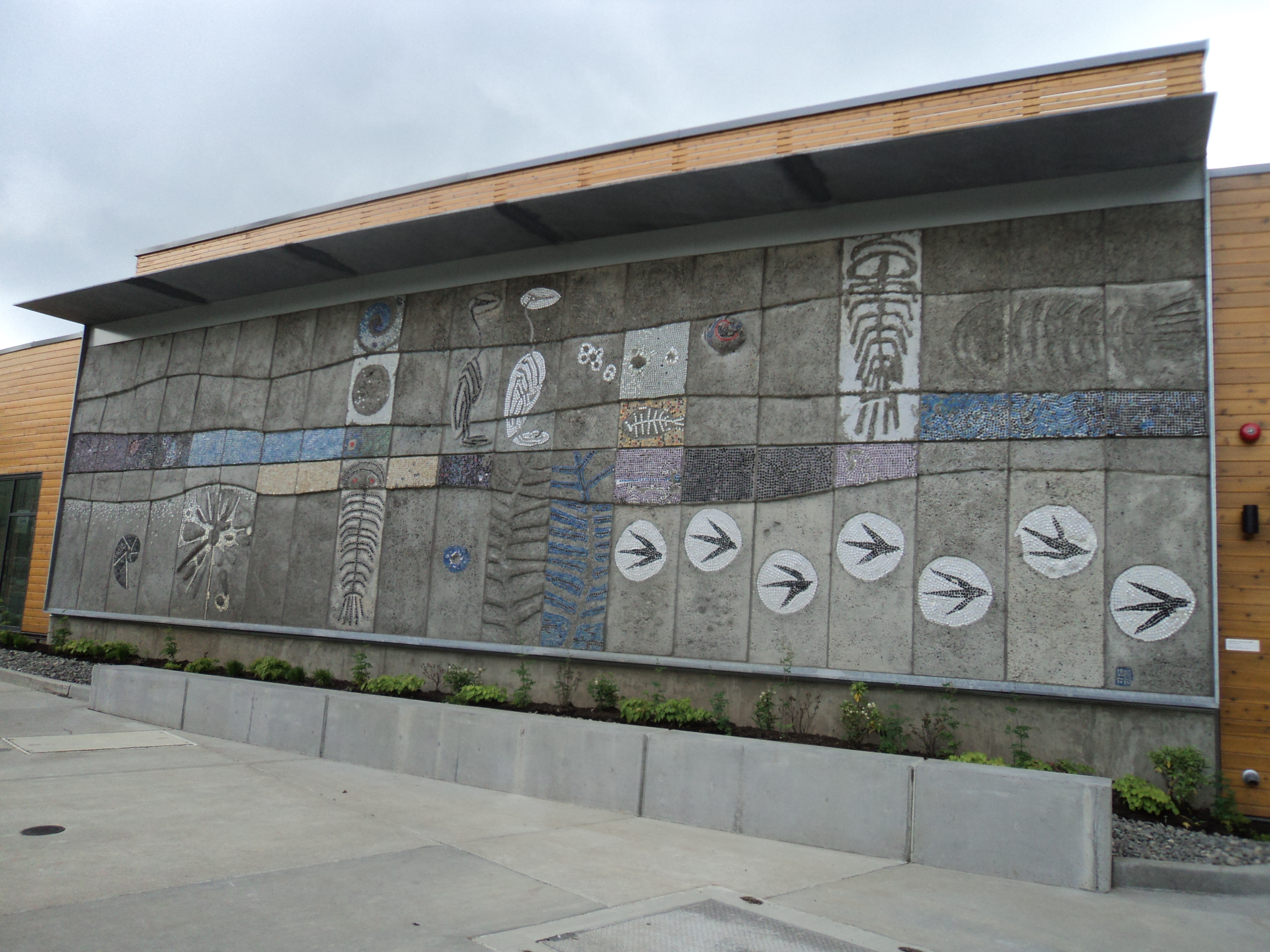
The Continuity of Life Forms, a 1959 mosaic by Willard Martin, is one of the many artworks at the zoo.

The zoo at its current site opened on July 3, 1959. It was renamed the Portland Zoological Gardens at that time, but remained commonly known as the Portland Zoo. The elephants and big cats were not moved to the new zoo until November. A new interchange was constructed on the adjacent freeway, the Sunset Highway, for better access to the new zoo.

=== Elephants ===
The zoo rose it popularity locally in 1953, when Rosy the Asian elephant was acquired. The zoo became world-famous in 1962 when the Asian elephant "Packy" was born. He was the first elephant born in the Western Hemisphere in 44 years and was (as of 2010) the tallest Asian elephant in the United States at 10.5 ft (3.2 m) tall. A total of 28 more calves have been born at the Oregon Zoo, including seven sired by Packy (two of which, Shine and Rama, remained at the zoo), making it the most successful zoo elephant breeding program in the world. On August 23, 2008, Rose-Tu, the granddaughter of the zoo's first elephant Rosy, gave birth to a son named Samudra. The birth made Samudra the first third-generation captive-born elephant in North America.

Attendance in 1962, the year Packy was born, was 1.2 million people. Over the next several years, the number of animals declined, from 450 (representing 150 species) in 1962 to 386 (representing 123 species) in 1976, and annual attendance also declining over the same period, reaching its lowest point in 1975, with 448,198 visitors.

On February 9, 2017, Oregon Zoo staff decided to euthanize Packy after a long struggle with drug-resistant tuberculosis. He was laid to rest at an unidentified city-owned "wooded, grassy area" that is not open to the public.

=== Metropolitan Service District ===
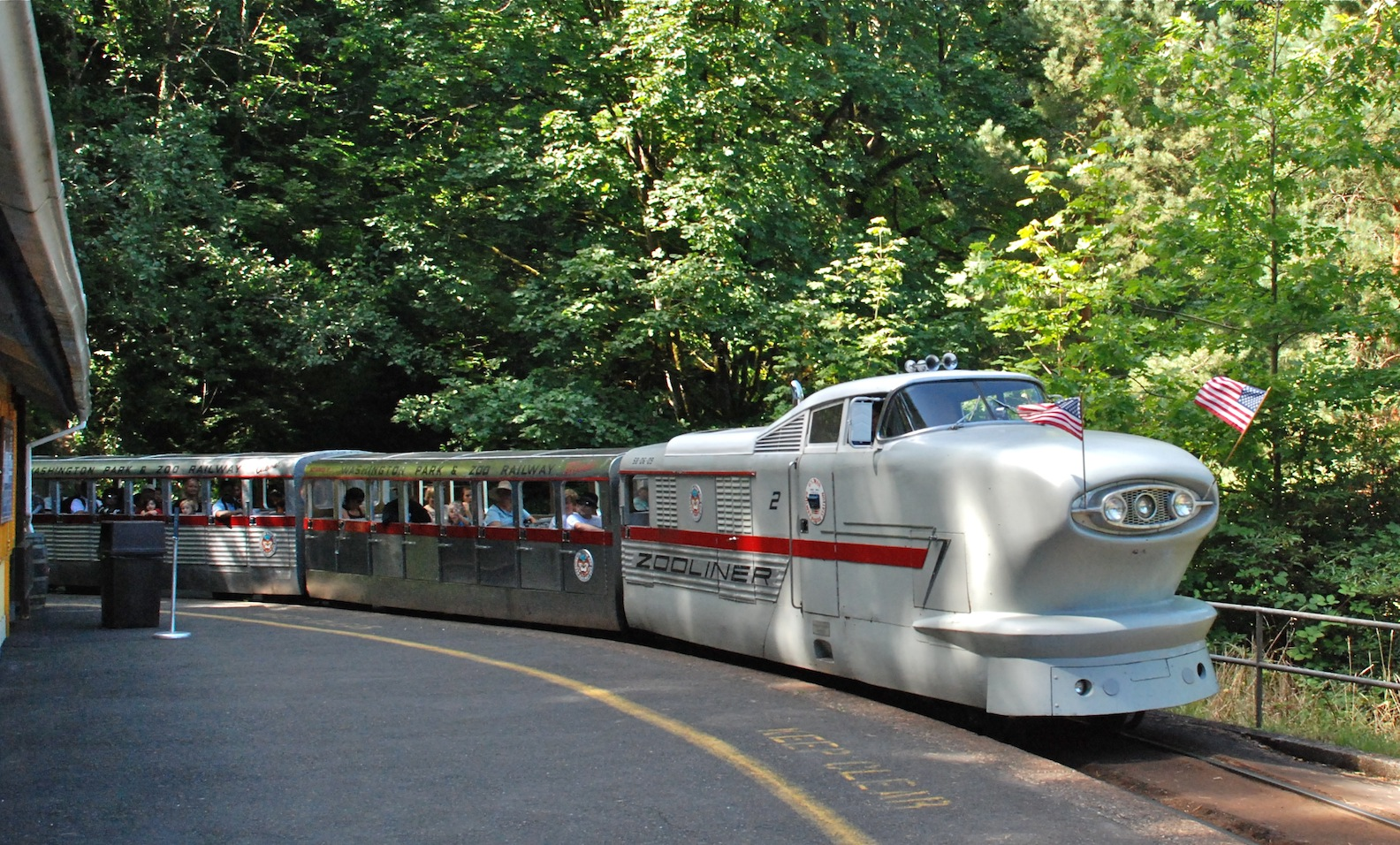
The Washington Park and Zoo Railway's Zooliner train.

Until 1971, the zoo was operated by the City, and then by the Portland Zoological Society under contract to the City. In 1976, area voters approved a tax levy plan under which the zoo was taken over by the Metropolitan Service District (or MSD, now known as Metro). Ownership of the zoo passed to Metro on July 1, 1976. Metro has continued expansion projects, aided by donors, sponsors and volunteers.

Later in 1976, MSD renamed the zoo the Washington Park Zoo after a naming contest. The railway was renamed the Washington Park and Zoo Railway two years later. The decline in attendance seen in the 1960s and 1970s eventually began to reverse, and the zoo recorded 752,632 visitors in 1984 and 897,189 in 1986.

=== Oregon Zoo ===
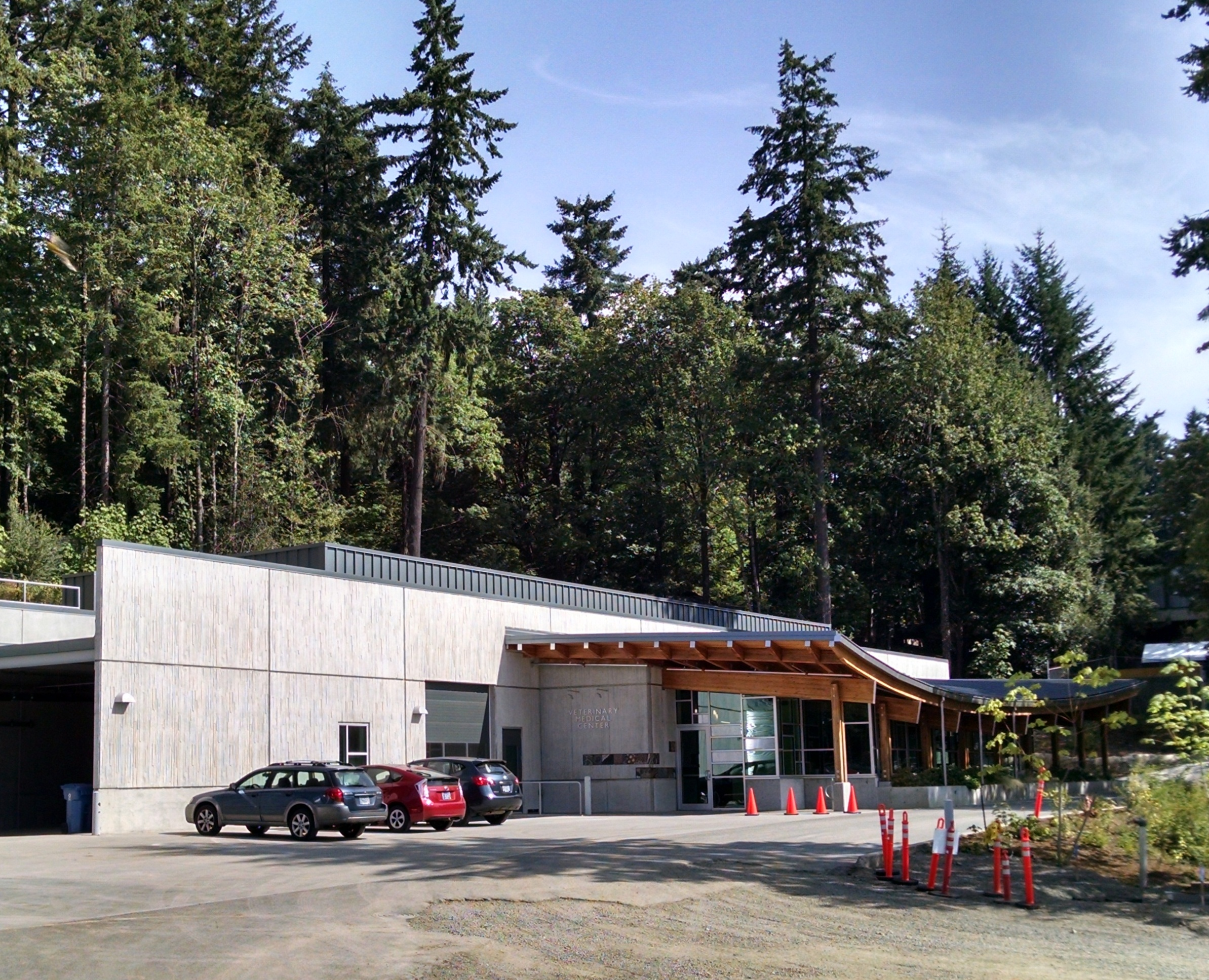
Veterinary Medical Center completed in 2014.

The Metro Council changed the zoo's name from the Washington Park Zoo to the Oregon Zoo in April 1998. In September of that year, the zoo became accessible by the region's MAX light rail system, with the opening of a Westside MAX line featuring an underground Washington Park station. In 2003, the zoo began participation in a California condor recovery program started by San Diego Wild Animal Park and Los Angeles Zoo. The program is designed to breed California condors to be released into the wild and save them from extinction.

In November 2008, regional voters approved a $125 million bond measure to improve infrastructure, enhance older exhibits and increase access to conservation education and the degree of sustainability. Attendance at the zoo reached a record 1.6 million visitors for their 2008 to 2009 year. The record was due in part to the birth of another baby elephant. A new record was set the following year with 1,612,359 people visiting the zoo. The zoo again brought in more than 1.7 million visitors in 2018.

== Exhibits ==
=== Africa Savanna ===
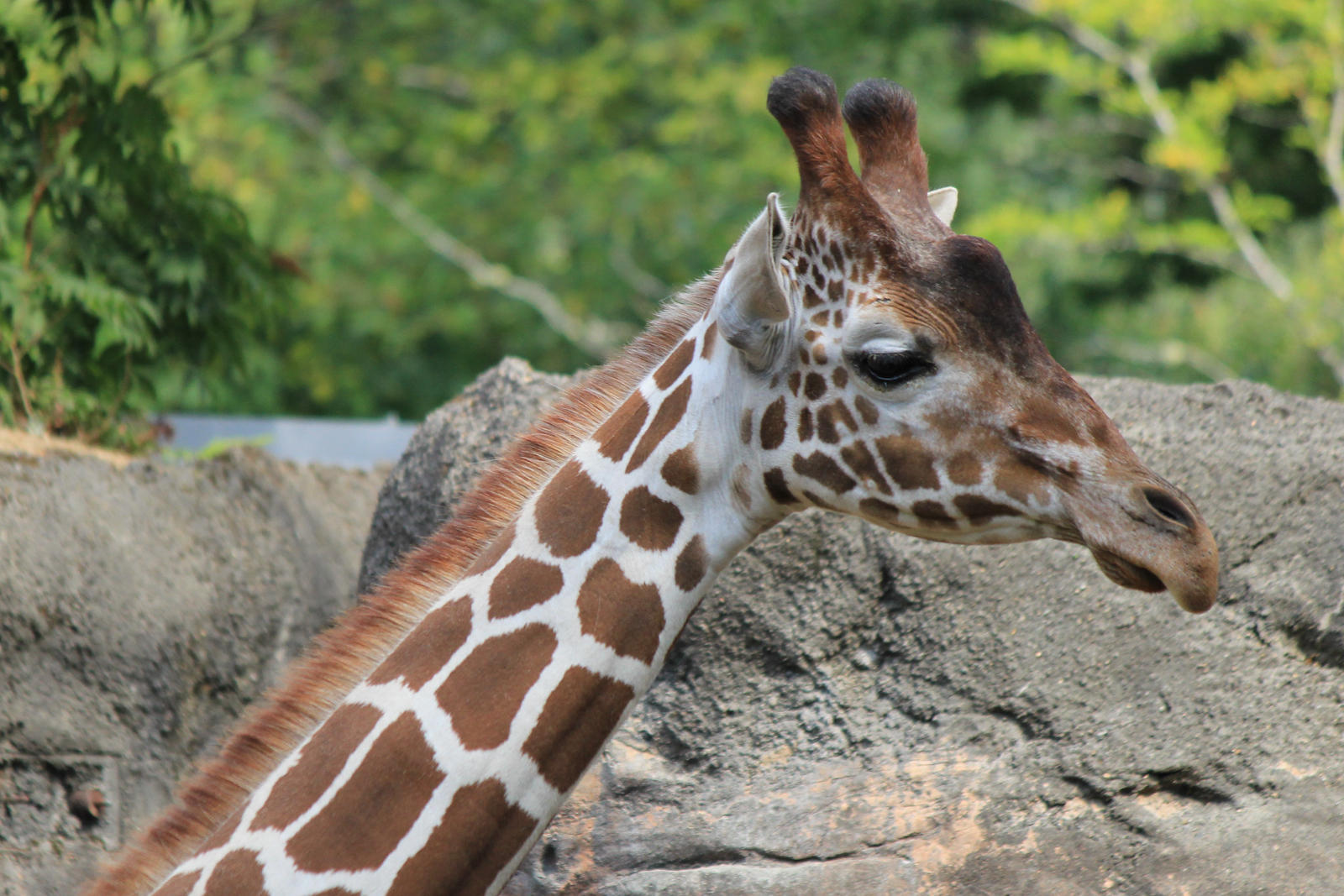
Giraffe at the Africa Savanna exhibit

Predators of the Serengeti, a $6.8 million exhibit which opened in September 2009, expanded the Africa Savanna 2.5 acres (10,000 m^{2}) into the site of the former Alaska Tundra exhibit which used to house: Muskoxen and Grizzly Bears. The zoo previously had lions, but closed the exhibit in 1998 to build Steller Cove. The three new lions come from zoos in California, Virginia and Wisconsin.

=== Discovery Plaza ===
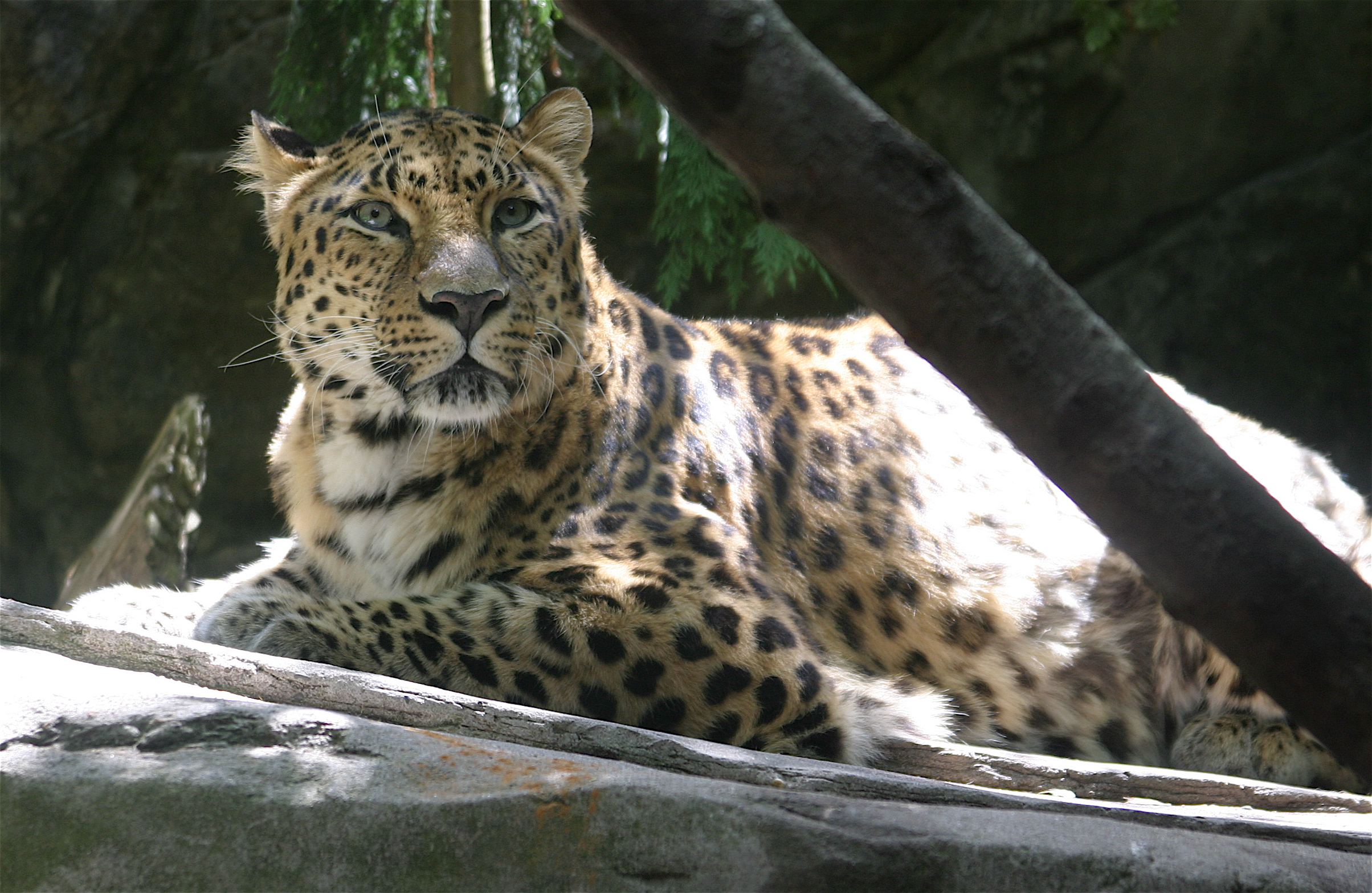
Amur leopard

The exhibit formerly contained a pair of Amur leopards with a 19 year old male named Boris being one of the oldest Amur leopards in captivity. Boris was euthanized on October 10, 2018

=== Great Northwest ===
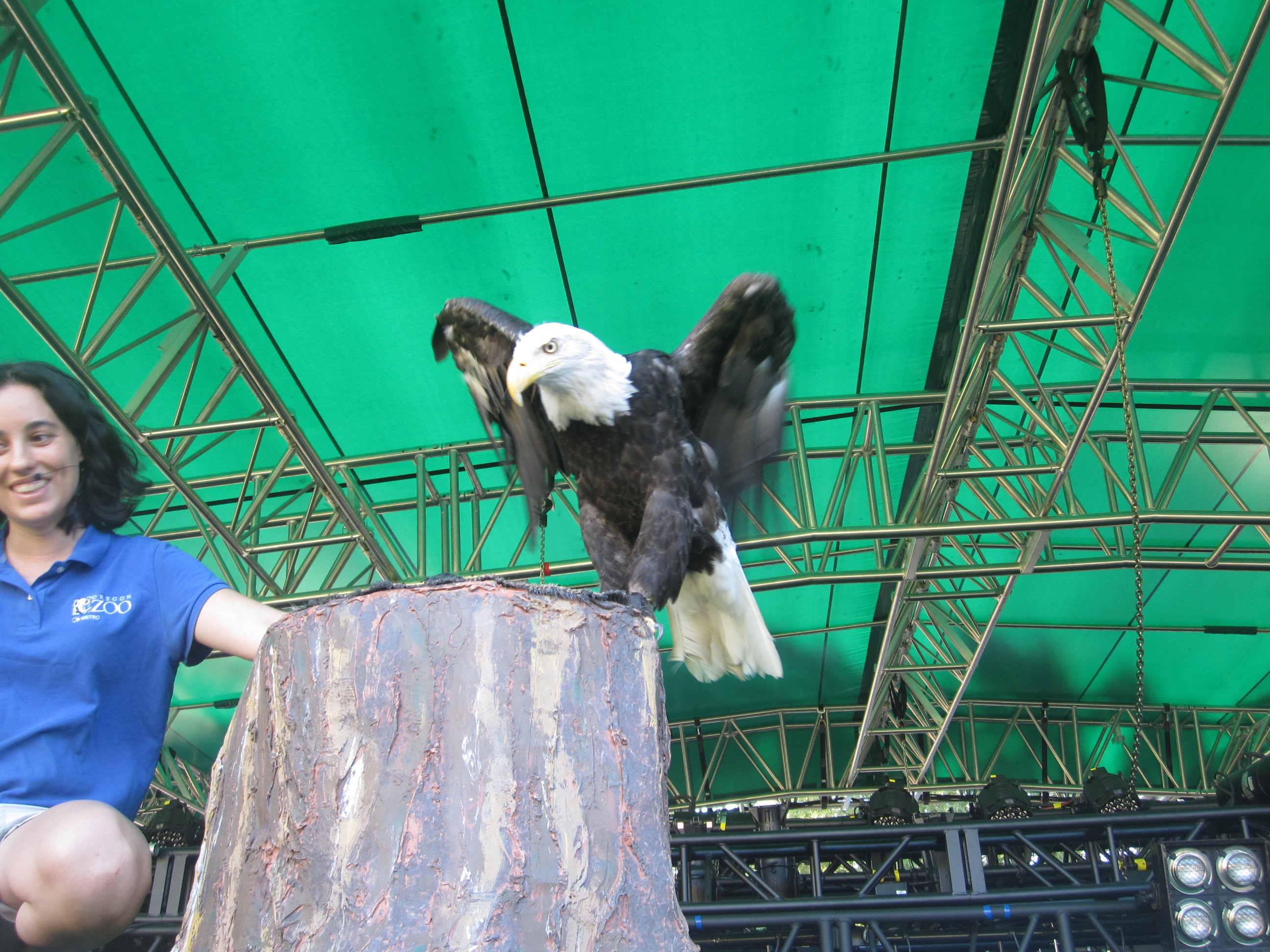
Bald eagle (Haliaeetus leucocephalus) with a zookeeper at a live show.

Black Bear Ridge has three black bears (two males and one female) added in April 2010 after the previous three had been euthanized for health reasons. Their names are Tuff, Dale, and Cubby. A fourth, Takota, died in 2023 during a routine medical procedure.

=== Primate Forest ===
The zoo housed the world's oldest Sumatran orangutan, Inji, who was humanely euthanized January 9, 2021 after keepers noticed her failing health.

== Public access ==
The Washington Park light rail station provides regional public transit access to the Oregon Zoo. TriMet bus route 63-Washington Park no longer serves the zoo via Washington Park as of summer 2022.

== Memorial fountain ==
The zoo features the Charles Frederic Swigert Jr. Memorial Fountain, an outdoor bronze and stone fountain and sculpture by American artist Richard Beyer, installed in 1983. It was donated by Christine Swigert in memory of her husband Charles F. Swigert Jr. The figure group depicts a man talking to a standing female child and several animals, including an ape, a lion or cougar, a monkey, and a family of wolves (including a cub). The man is shown with a monkey behind him and a lion and wolf cub at his feet. The installation measures approximately 5 feet (1.5 m) x 20 feet (6.1 m) x 7 feet (2.1 m). The Oregonian has described the appearance of one of the wolves as "friendly". An accompanying plaque reads:

THE / CHARLES FREDERIC SWIGERT JR. / MEMORIAL FOUNTAIN / GIVEN BY CHRISTINE SWIGERT / IN MEMORY OF HER HUSBAND. / BESIDE THE WATER / LIFE AND THE WORLD CAN BE FOUND / I THINK OF A FRIEND / SCULPTURE BY RICH BEYER / DEDICATED ON AUGUST 1, 1983

== Conservation ==
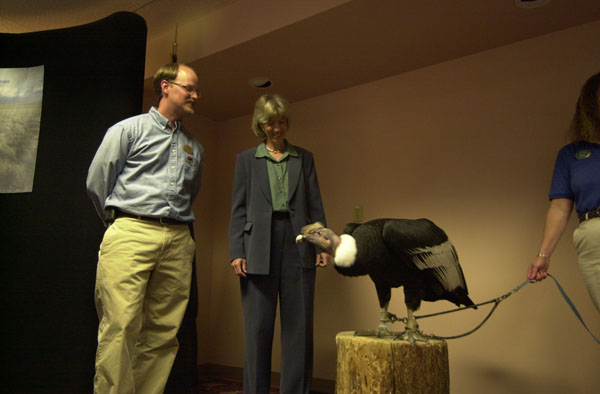
United States Secretary of the Interior Gale Norton at a zoo event highlighting the conservation work of different condor species, with the Andean condor in view.

The Oregon Zoo collaborates with wildlife agencies and conservation organizations on recovery projects for imperiled species including California condors, Mazama newts, Pacific lamprey, western pond turtles, northern leopard frogs, Oregon silverspot butterflies and Taylor’s checkerspot butterflies. The zoo manages a community science project to monitor the American pika and was the first zoo in the world to successfully breed critically endangered Columbia Basin pygmy rabbits and Oregon silverspot butterflies.

In 2012 the Oregon Zoo became the first zoo to draw blood samples from polar bears without the use of anesthesia, leading to the development of a groundbreaking polar bear conservation science program. The zoo has since partnered with the U.S. Geological Survey on polar bear diet, energetics, and movement studies. In Borneo, the zoo supports elephant conservation by funding two ranger positions, and partners with Malaysian and Indonesian organizations to mitigate human-wildlife conflict and improve animal welfare for elephants and orangutans.

=== California Condors ===
In 2001 the zoo joined the U.S. Fish and Wildlife Service’s California Condor Recovery Program. California Condors are slow to reproduce, laying only one egg every one to two years. In 2003 the first six condor breeding pairs were brought to the zoo's 52-acre Johnsson Center for Wildlife Conservation. More than 140 chicks have hatched at the Jonsson Center since 2003, and more than 100 Oregon Zoo-reared birds have gone out to field pens for release.

Some Oregon Zoo hatched condors were among the first released by Yurok Tribe in Redwoods National Park in their historic effort to return species to their ancestral homeland in 2022. https://www.hcn.org/issues/54-6/indigenous-affairs-birds-the-yurok-tribe-is-bringing-condors-home-to-northern-california-skies/

The zoo also manages community-based conservation education efforts, including the Lead-Free Hunting Education Program, to protect condors and other wildlife from lead poisoning, the greatest cause of wild condor mortality. Ingesting carcasses riddled with toxic lead fragments results in approximately 50 percent of known causes of condor deaths since 1992.

Mazama Newts

The Crater Lake newt or Mazama newt, Taricha granulosa mazamae, is a subspecies of the rough-skinned newt. Found only in Crater Lake, Oregon. Crater Lake newts are genetically and morphologically distinct from neighboring rough-skinned newts, with the most notable differences being a comparative lack of tetrodotoxin in their skin, and a darker ventral surface. While other members of their species have orange lower surfaces, in an example of aposematic coloration to warn predators of their toxicity, Crater Lake newts were the apex predators in their environment for thousands of years, and lost the highly toxic skin of their ancestors.

The Crater Lake newt population is under threat due to predation from invasive crayfish and rainbow trout that have been introduced into the lake. Beginning in 2025, the Oregon Zoo partnered with the National Park Service and the High Desert Museum in an effort to remove a population of newts and bring them to the Oregon Zoo where they are attempting to breed newts in captivity with the ambition to return them to the lake once the invasive species problems can be mitigated.

=== Pacific Northwest Frogs and Turtles ===
From 1998 to 2012 the zoo partnered on a recovery effort for endangered Oregon spotted frogs, a candidate for listing under the federal Endangered Species Act, and currently collaborates on a head-start and release program for northern leopard frogs. Frog eggs are collected and hatched at the Oregon Zoo or the Cedar Creek Correction Center, which has partnered with the zoo since 2009. Juvenile frogs are then released into the wild, with a goal of creating a self-sustaining population. The captive rearing project works in collaboration with regional zoos and aquariums to save Pacific Northwest frog species imperiled by loss of habitat, invasive predators and the deadly chytrid fungus, which has quickly spread from Africa to threaten amphibian populations worldwide.

The Oregon Zoo's Western Pond Turtle Recovery Project has helped establish two new western pond turtle populations in the Columbia River Gorge, where invasive bullfrogs have driven the tiny species to the brink of extinction. Infant pond turtles are collected and raised in the project lab at the zoo until they large enough to be safely released back into the wild. More than 1,500 turtles have been released in the Columbia Gorge since 1990, with a 95 percent annual survival rate.

=== Butterflies ===
In 1999, at the request of the US Fish and Wildlife Service, the Oregon Zoo joined with Seattle's Woodland Park Zoo in an Oregon silverspot butterfly captive rearing program to save a species once found from California to British Columbia and now reduced to five isolated populations. Around 2,000 butterflies have been raised from larvae and released each year at the Oregon coast. For this work the two zoos were jointly awarded the 2012 AZA North American Conservation Award. In 2019, the Oregon Zoo successfully bred a captive silverspot butterfly for the first time in the world, producing in 269 viable offspring.

Additionally, the zoo has partnered with the Coffee Creek Correctional Facility to train inmates who volunteer to help raise and care for the critically endangered Taylor's butterfly. Habitat degradation due to invasive species, urban development and agriculture have reduced the Taylor's checkerspots' native habitat by 99 percent. The Taylor's checkerspot captive rearing project has raised and released over 28,000 butterflies.

=== Borneo Elephants ===
Oregon Zoo’s Care and Conservation of Borneo Elephants program supports projects in Sabah, Malaysia, to reduce human-wildlife conflict, create safe travel corridors for elephants and other wildlife in degraded landscapes and provide care for injured or orphaned elephants. The Zoo partners with Seratu Aatai to promote co-existence between people and elephants through research and educational outreach to local communities, government agencies, the palm oil industry and academics.

In 2015 the Woodland Park Zoo, Houston Zoo, Oregon Zoo and HUTAN-KOCP founded the “Borneo Elephant Zoo Alliance” with the goal of ensuring long-term survival of the Bornean elephant in the wild. The alliance focuses on enhancing scientific knowledge of elephant ecology and conservation status and reducing human-animal conflict in the Kinabatangan River area through community outreach, public policy, and use of technology. In recent years, Oregon Zoo’s work with HUTAN-KOCP has focused primarily on forest preservation and reforestation for the benefit of both elephants and orangutans.

=== Pygmy Rabbits ===
The Pygmy rabbit is the smallest native rabbit in North America, principally found in the Great Basin. There is a small isolated population in the Columbia basin in eastern Washington state, which was formally listed as severely endangered in 2003. At the request of US Fish and Wildlife Service and Washington Department of Fish and Wildlife, the Oregon Zoo partnered with Washington State University, Northwest Trek Wildlife Park and others to develop a breeding and rescue plan from 2002 -2012. Sixteen remaining rabbits were brought into captivity. To increase genetic diversity and the chances of survival, this small population was crossbred with pygmy rabbits from the larger populations in Idaho and Nevada. When the captive breeding program was closed in 2012, approximately 90 rabbits had been raised and released, into semi-wild and protected areas.

Ongoing monitoring by WDFW has shown encouraging signs that a self sustaining population may eventually survive, but the pygmy rabbit remains threatened by the conversion of its native sagebrush habitat to agriculture. About 50% of the breeding populations were lost in the Sutherland Canyon fire of 2018 and the Pearl Hill fires in 2020. A vaccination program has been started to protect them from a viral rabbit hemorrhagic disease which has emerged in neighboring states.

=== Pacific Lamprey ===
Pacific lamprey are dark eel-like fish measuring up to 80cm long, found in the ocean and rivers of the Pacific Rim, from the Bering Sea down to Mexico. After spawning in fresh water they grow to a juvenile stage that attaches parasitically to larger fish that carry them into the ocean. Two to five years later, the adults return upriver to spawn and then die. Lamprey are thought to have appeared 450 million years ago. Once prolific in the region, their numbers have declined dramatically within living memory, principally due to construction of dams. They are considered a species of concern by the US, Oregon and Washington Fish and Wildlife Services.

Lamprey contain a high fat content and are an important food source for birds, mammals and other fish. In the past they were an important food staple for Native American tribes with strong cultural and spiritual significance A few fish are occasionally harvested at Willamette Falls but are only sufficient for traditional rituals. The Columbia River Tribes (CRITFC) have been working actively since 2011 to try and preserve the species.

Lamprey have been shown at the Oregon Zoo since 2019, in the “Great Northwest” area, to represent the cultural and ecological significance of the species. Since 2025 the Zoo has partnered with CRITFC in an experimental conservation strategy to reintroduce lamprey above the Detroit Dam on the North Santiam River, where currently none exist. Twenty-three fish collected at Willamette Falls in June 2025 were cared for at the Zoo over the winter, before releasing them in April 2026. These fish have been “DNA fingerprinted” so that their breeding success and viability can be compared with other fish that were translocated directly without staying at the Zoo. It is hoped that a similar cohort will follow annually.

== Notable incidents ==
On July 4, 1970, three intoxicated men broke into the zoo at night. One of them was killed by the zoo's two lions while he was showing off by lowering himself into their enclosure. The next night, one of the men broke into the zoo again and shot both of the lions to death. The incident stirred a public outcry against the men, including the victim of the mauling and sparked a wave of donations to replace the lions.

In April 2000, Rose-Tu, a female elephant born at the zoo, was severely abused by her handler, resulting in 176 lacerations including puncture wounds allegedly due to the handler attempting to shove a bullhook into her anus. It was speculated that the trauma suffered by her as a result of this experience may have compromised her ability to raise calves. The handler was dismissed by the zoo and sentenced to two years probation and 120 hours of community service, the most severe punishment allowed by state laws at the time. As fallout from this incident, Animal Legal Defense Fund authored the Rose-Tu law, signed by Governor John Kitzhaber in 2001. The law made Oregon the first U.S. state to legally recognize the link between animal abuse and violence toward people, and increased the penalties for animal abuse.

In December 2012, the Seattle Times brought to light that the new-born elephant Lily, sired by Tusko, a bull elephant on loan from the elephant rental company Have Trunk Will Travel, was contracted to be owned by the private company. After widespread public outcry, the zoo raised funds to acquire both Tusko and Lily from Have Trunk Will Travel for $400,000 in February 2013.

In May 2014, then-director Kim Smith and lead veterinarian Dr. Mitch Finnegan were dismissed by Metro, the agency governing the Zoo, over alleged lapses in protocols following the death of Kutai, a 20-year-old orangutan, during surgery. After the Zoo protested the veterinarian's termination at Metro Council, he was rehired in July.

In June 2014, six tamarin monkeys died two days after arriving at the zoo from Harvard's New England Primate Research Center. The incident, along with previous primate deaths in Massachusetts, prompted a USDA investigation of the Harvard center that had transported the monkeys.

== See also ==
- Culture of Portland, Oregon
- The Continuity of Life Forms, a mosaic by Portland architect and artist Willard Martin that was originally installed at the former entrance to the zoo in 1959, and was re-installed outside of the zoo's new education center in July 2016.
