= API (disambiguation) =

API, or application programming interface, is a connection between computers or programs.

API, api, or Api may also refer to:

== Companies and organizations ==
- Academic Programs International, an American study-abroad provider
- Aliansi Perempuan Indonesia, or Indonesian Women's Alliance, a political grouping in Indonesia
- American Petroleum Institute, an American trade-lobbying and international-standardization organization
- Animal Protection Institute, an American non-profit organization
- Anonima Petroli Italiana, an Italian petrol (gasoline) company
- Associated Producers Incorporated a B-movie subsidiary of 20th Century Fox
- Athletes' Performance Institute, an American training facility for competitive athletes
- Australian Pharmaceutical Industries, a health and beauty company owned by Wesfarmers
- Australian Property Institute, an Australian professional organization in valuation
- Automated Processes, Inc., an American audio electronics company
- Automobile Products of India, an Indian automotive company
- Aviation Partners Inc., an American aviation components company

== Education ==
- Academic Performance Index, a measure of scholastic performance used in California, United States
- Auburn University, formerly known as Alabama Polytechnic Institute

== Places ==
- Api (mountain), Nepal
- Api Chamber, a large cave chamber in Malaysia
- Mount Api, Malaysia

== Politics ==
- Alliance for Italy, a centrist political party in Italy
- Arab Peace Initiative, a peace initiative proposed in 2002 at the Beirut Summit of the Arab League

== Science and technology ==
- Active pharmaceutical ingredient, a basic component of any medicine or pharmaceutical drug
- Advanced primer ignition, a type of blowback operation for firearms that ignites the primer when the bolt is still moving with the goal of increasing rate of fire and decreasing felt recoil
- Aminopropylindole, a chemical compound
- Petroleum industry nomenclature deriving from American Petroleum Institute:
  - API gravity, a measure of the density of petroleum
  - API number, a unique identifier applied to each petroleum exploration or production well drilled in the United States
- Analytical Profile Index, a miniaturized panel of biochemical tests compiled for identification of groups of closely related bacteria
- API oil-water separator
- Air Pollution Index, a measure of air quality used in Hong Kong and Malaysia
- Armor-piercing incendiary, a type of armor-piercing shot and shell
- Atmospheric pressure ionization, a type of ionization in mass spectrometry

== Other uses ==
- Advance Passenger Information, a passenger name record collected by commercial transportation operations
- Asian-Pacific Islander
- Aviation Preflight Indoctrination, the first major phase of training for a United States Naval Aviator
- Announcement in the public interest, an alternate name for a public-service announcement
- International Phonetic Alphabet, a system of phonetic notation (known in French as the alphabet phonétique international)
- Api (apple), an apple cultivar
- Apiaká language (ISO 639-3 language code: api)

== See also ==
- AP1 (disambiguation)
- API Network, an Australian organisation of public intellectuals, and book publisher
