= List of caves in Malaysia =

The following article shows a list of caves in Malaysia:

== Sabah ==
- Agop Batu Tulug Caves
- Batu Punggul Cave
- Batu Timbang Cave
- Baturong Cave
- Gomantong Caves
- Keningau Cave
- Madai Cave
- Punan Batu Cave
- Sinobang Cave
- Sipit Cave
- Tapadong Cave

== Sarawak ==
- Biocyclone Cave
- Black Rock Cave
- Clearwater Cave
- Cobra Cave
- Cobweb Cave
- Daud's Cave
- Deception Cave
- Deer Cave
- Deliverance Cave
- Disappointment Cave
- Drunken Forest Cave
- Fairy Cave
- Green Cathedral Cave
- Green Cave
- Hornbill's Secret Cave
- Lagang's Cave
- Lascaux Cave in Malaysia
- Laing's Cave
- Leopard Cave
- Lori's Cave
- Metric Cave
- Niah Caves
- Pepper Leaf Cave
- Perseverance Cave
- Racer Cave
- Sakai's Cave
- Sarawak Chamber
- Snail Shell Cave
- Snake Track Cave
- Solo Pot
- Stone Horse Cave
- Tardis Cave
- Thunder Cave
- Tiger Cave
- Turtle Cave
- Ulat Cincin Cave
- Viper's Pit
- White Rock Cave
- Wind Cave
- and more than 200 others not listed

== Peninsular Malaysia ==
There are at least 445 limestone hills in Peninsular Malaysia.

Kedah

- Gua Gunung Keriang
- Gua Kerbau
- Caves of Baling
  - Gua Air
  - Gua Sireh
  - Gua Jepun
  - Gua Kelambu
  - Gua Tembus
- Caves of Langkawi
  - Gua Langsir
  - Gua Kelawar
  - Gua Landak
  - Gua Buaya
  - Gua Dangli
  - Gua Cerita
  - Gua Pasir Dagang
  - Gua Pinang
  - Gua Tok Sabung

Kelantan

- Caves of Dabong
  - Gua Ikan
  - Gua Keris
- Caves of Gua Musang
  - Gua Musang (namesake)
  - Gua Chiku 2
  - Gua Madu
  - Gua Cha
- Gunung Reng

Pahang

- Gua Charas
- Gunung Senyum
- Kenong Rimba Park
- Kota Gelanggi
- Caves of Merapoh
  - Gua Hari Malaysia (also known as Gua Padang Kawad)
  - Gua Air Mata Dayang
  - Gua Seribu Cerita
  - Gua Jinjang Pelamin
  - Gua Tahi Bintang

Perak

- Caves of Kinta Valley (see also Kinta Valley National Geopark)
  - Gua Kandu
  - Gua Air
  - Gua Angin
  - Gua Kanthan
  - Gua Tempurung
  - Gua Tambun
  - Gua Datok
  - Ipoh cave temples
- Caves of Lenggong
  - Gua Gunung Runtuh
  - Gua Tok Giring
  - Gua Teluk Kelawar
  - Gua Ngaum
  - Gua Badak
  - Gua Asar
  - Gua Kajang

Perlis

- Gua Kelam
- Gua Wang Burma
- Gua Bintong

Selangor

- Batu Caves
  - Art Gallery Cave
  - Dark Cave
  - Temple Cave

Terengganu

- Caves at Kenyir Lake
  - Gua Bewah
  - Gua Taat

Negeri Sembilan

So far, Negeri Sembilan is the only known state to host two types of caves.

- Gua Batu Maloi (talus)
- Pasoh Caves (karstic)

== See also ==
- Benarat 2005 Expedition
- List of caves
- Speleology
