= Ilex megaphylla =

Conservation status
- Least Concern (IUCN 3.1)

Scientific classification
- Kingdom: Plantae
- Clade: Tracheophytes
- Clade: Angiosperms
- Clade: Eudicots
- Clade: Asterids
- Order: Aquifoliales
- Family: Aquifoliaceae
- Genus: Ilex
- Species: I. megaphylla

Binomial name
- Ilex megaphylla S.Andrews

Species of tree in the holly family

Ilex megaphylla is a tree in the holly family Aquifoliaceae, native to Borneo. The specific epithet megaphylla means 'large leaves'.

== Description ==
Ilex megaphylla grows up to 8 metres (26 ft) tall. The smooth bark is grey. The leathery leaves are lanceolate to oblong and measure up to 35 cm (14 in) long. The inflorescences, in cymes, feature white flowers.

== Distribution and habitat ==
Ilex megaphylla is endemic to Borneo, where it is confined to Sarawak. It is only found in Gunung Buda National Park and Gunung Mulu National Park, where species populations are adequately conserved. Its habitat is on hills and cliffs of limestone, at elevations of around 1,000 m (3,300 ft).
