= Gunung Buda National Park =

National park in Sarawak, Malaysia

- IUCN category II (national park)
- Location within Borneo
- Location: Sarawak, Malaysia
- Coordinates: 4°14′N 114°57′E
- Area: 66.2 km^{2} (25.6 sq mi)
- Established: 2001

Gunung Buda National Park is a national park located in Limbang Division, Sarawak, Malaysia. It is located to the north of Gunung Mulu National Park. Gunung Buda National Park was gazetted in 2001. As in September 2017, the national park was in the planning stage for tourism activities. Roads were also planned to connect Gunung Buda with Gunung Mulu National Park. Gunung Buda meaning White Hill in Lun Bawang language.

== History ==
An expedition by British cavers in 1978 found the entrances and initial passages to several large caves such as Deer Cave and Clearwater Cave at Gunung Mulu National Park. These discoveries led to further explorations of Mulu caves in the subsequent years.

Americans first visited Gunung Buda when John Lane and George Prest visited the mountain to assess its potential for an American expedition in 1993. In late 1994 and early 1995 the first American expedition took place. Others followed in 1996, 1997, and 2000. Collectively the expeditions have surveyed more than 60 kilometres of cave passages beneath Gunung Buda. The 1997 expeditions were made by the members of National Speleological Society.

== Geography ==
The highest mountain in the national park is Mount Buda, stood at 963 m (3,159 ft) high. It is separated from Mount Benarat by Medalem Gorge.

== Climate ==
The climate is wet year around and temperatures climb into the low 30s Celsius every day.

== Biodiversity ==
The rain forests of Buda and nearby Mulu host a tremendous diversity of life including at least 300 bird species, numerous primates, more than 2,500 tree species, more than 60 snakes and many other beautiful varied forms of life.

Changes in substrate, slope, elevation and drainage make the forests of the area particularly varied. At Gunung Buda, limestone forest, lowland dipterocarp forests, kerangas swamp forests and upland dipterocarp forests all grow.
