= Rimba =

Rimba may refer to:

== Places ==
=== Brunei ===
- Kampong Rimba, village outside Bandar Seri Begawan

=== Indonesia ===
- Rimba Raya Biodiversity Reserve, a forest reserve in Kalimantan

=== Malaysia ===
- Kenong Rimba Park, a protected rainforest park
- Rimba Ilmu Botanical Gardens, Kuala Lumpur
- Taman Rimba Komanwel, a park in Selayang, Selangor

== People ==
- Miguel Rimba, a former Bolivian football player
- Orang Rimba, a group of nomadic people in Sumatra, Indonesia

== In arts and entertainment ==
- Poetri Rimba, a 1941 Indonesian film
- Rimba (animation), Indonesian animated TV series
- Rimba Racer, a 2014 Malaysian animated TV series
  - Rimba Grand Prix, fictional company and the series' primary setting
  - Rimba News Network, fictional sports channel
