= Good Luck Cave =

Cave in the state of Sarawak in Malaysia

- Gua Nasib Bagus
- Location: Gunung Mulu National Park, Sarawak
- Length: 2,900 m (9,500 ft)
- Height variation: 412 m (1,352 ft)
- Discovery: 1980
- Difficulty: Advanced
- Access: Restricted
- Features: Sarawak chamber (largest underground chamber in the world)
- Website: Official website

Gua Nasib Bagus (Good Luck Cave) or Lubang Nasib Bagus is a cave located in the state of Sarawak in Malaysia. It is one of many caves found within Gunung Mulu National Park, a World Heritage Site on the island of Borneo.

The cave houses the second largest known underground chamber in the world, Sarawak Chamber. It is about 600 m long, about 415 m wide, and around about 80 m high.
