= Api Chamber =

Cave chamber in Sarawak, Malaysia

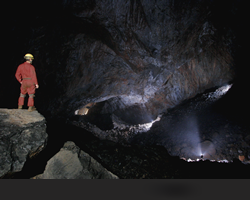
Api Chamber in Whiterock Cave, taken during the Benarat 2005 Expedition

Api Chamber is a chamber in Whiterock Cave in Mount Api, Gunung Mulu National Park, Sarawak, Malaysia. Measuring 300 m by 200 m and with a surveyed circumference of 900 m it is the ninth largest cave chamber by area in the world. Its height is over 100 m and its plan area is 58,000 square metres. It is the second largest chamber in Malaysia after Sarawak Chamber.

It was discovered during the Benarat 2005 Caving Expedition by Dave Nixon and Mark Brown.
