= Saeaga Airlines =

Regional airline of Malaysia (1995-1998)

Saeaga Airlines Sdn Bhd

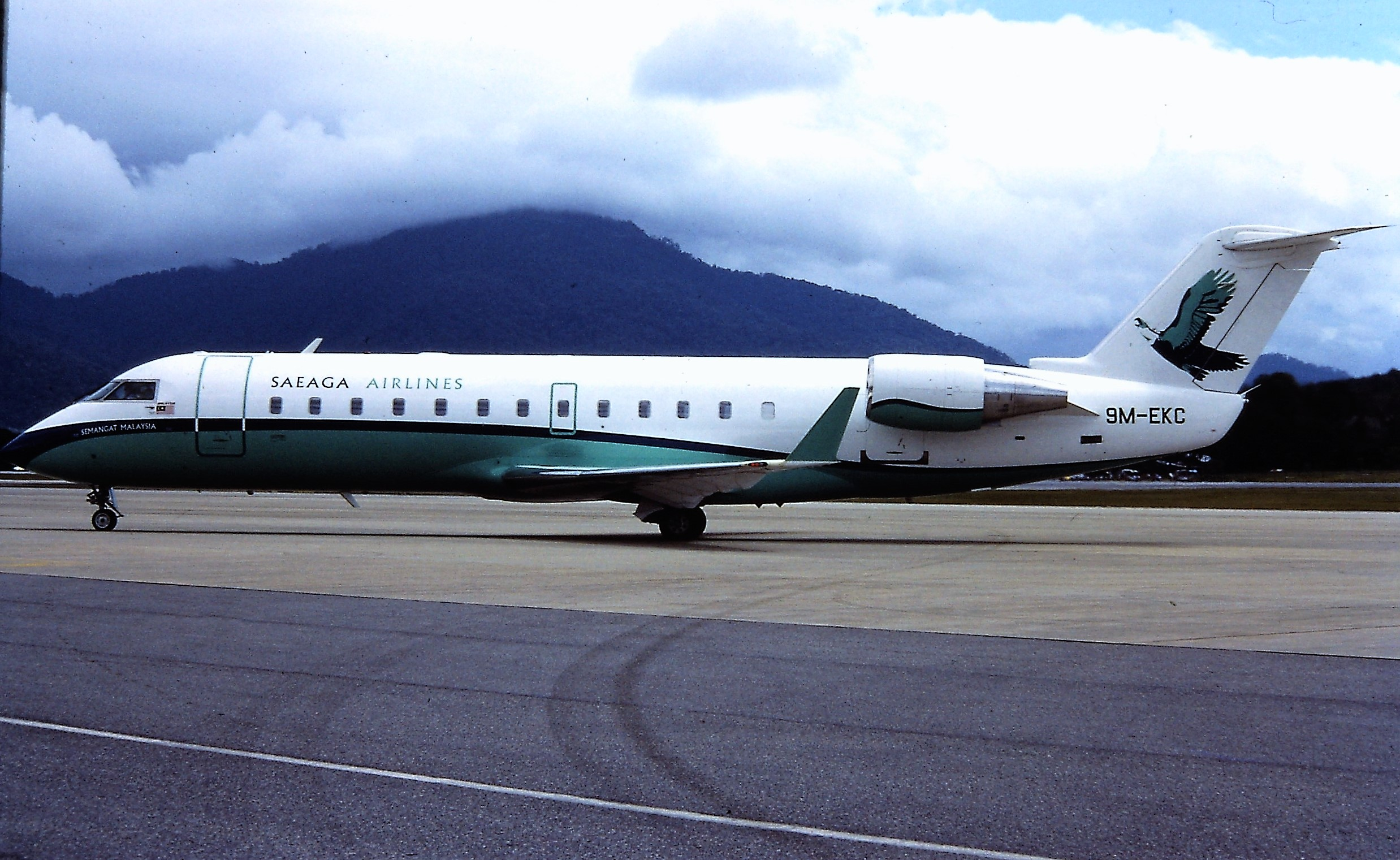
- Saeaga Airlines CRJ 100 performs at Langkawi International Airport
IATA	ICAO	Call sign
S5	SGG	SAEAGA
- Founded: October 17, 1995; 30 years ago
- Commenced operations: November 29, 1995; 30 years ago
- Ceased operations: March 1, 1998; 28 years ago
- Hubs: Kota Kinabalu International Airport
- Fleet size: 3
- Destinations: 4
- Parent company: Ekran Berhad
- Headquarters: Jalan Parlimen, Kuala Lumpur, Malaysia
- Key people: Ting Pek Khiing (CEO)

Saeaga Airlines (sometimes referred as Saeaga Air) was a domestic regional airline based in Sabah, Malaysia.

== History ==
The airline was established in 1995 when Ekran Air, Hornbill Skyways and Sabah Air had a merger agreement to formed Saeaga Airlines (Acronym: Sarawak-Sabah East ASEAN Growth Area), within 80% owned by Sarawak and Sabah while 20% belongs to Ekran Air itself. The airline started operation by the fourth prime minister of malaysia Mahathir Mohamad to operated services for EAGA (East ASEAN Growth Area).

The airlines had acquired one CRJ 100 and two De Havilland Canada Dash 8, it also planned to ordered 5 Airbus A320 to expand its destination outside EAGA by September 1998.

However, following the financial crisis from 1997 to 1998, Ekran suspended all its flight in 1 March 1998 and declined its order for Airbus A320.

== Destinations ==
Saeaga Airlines served the following destinations as of 1997:

Sabah

- Swallow Reef (Layang-Layang Airport)

Sarawak

- Kuching (Kuching International Airport)
- Mulu (Mulu Airport)
- Sibu (Sibu Airport)

=== Planned destinations ===
Australia

- Darwin (Darwin International Airport)
- Perth (Perth Airport)

China

- Hong Kong (Kai Tak Airport)
- Macau (Macau International Airport)

Malaysia

- Kota Kinabalu (Kota Kinabalu International Airport)
- Langkawi (Langkawi International Airport)
- Subang (Kuala Lumpur International Airport)

Singapore

- Seletar (Seletar Airport)

Taiwan

- Taipei (Chiang Kai-shek International Airport)

== Fleet ==
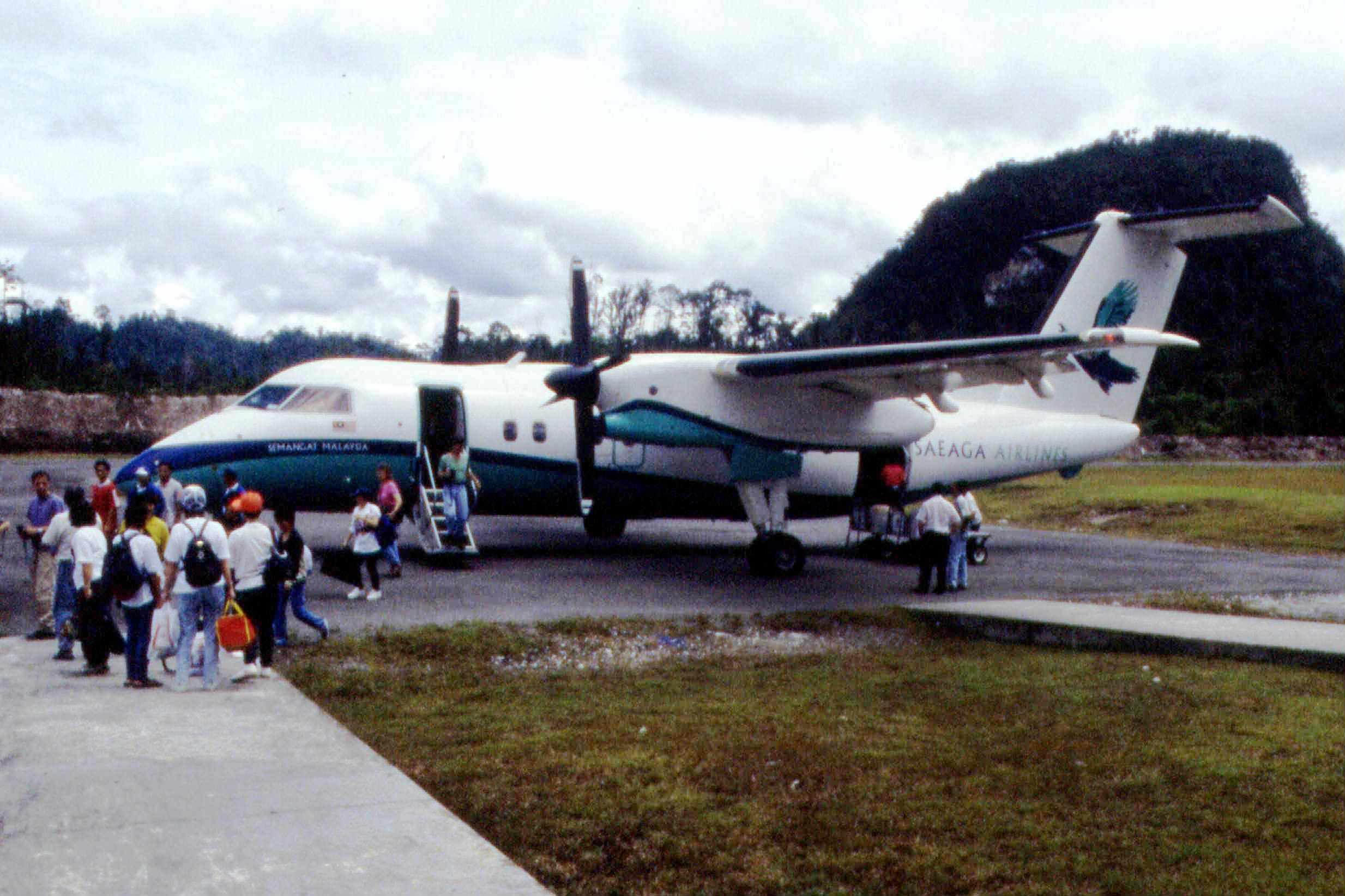
Saeaga Airlines De Havilland Canada Dash 8-200 at Mulu Airport in 1996

Before Saeaga Airlines ceased its operations in 1998, the airline fleet consisted of:

Saeaga Airlines fleet
Aircraft	Total	Introduced	Retired	Ref
Airbus A320	5	1997	1998	
Canadair Regional Jet CRJ100	1	1996	1998	
De Havilland Canada Dash 8-200	1	1995	1998	
De Havilland Canada Dash 8-300	1	1995	1998	
