= Benarat Cavern System =

Cave system in Mount Benarat, Malaysia

Coordinates: 4°09′11.4″N 114°54′27.8″E

- Interactive map of Benarat Cavern System
- Location: Gunung Mulu National Park, Sarawak
- Length: 50.5 km (31.4 mi)
- Height variation: 450.3 m (1,477 ft)
- Discovery: See list: Benarat Caverns (1978); Hurricane Hole (connected in 2000); Moon Cave (connected in 2005); Cobweb Cave (connected in 2007)
- Website: Official website

Benarat Cavern (Malay: Lubang Benarat) is a cave system in Mount Benarat at the northern end of Mulu National Park, Malaysia. As of 2011, it is the third-longest known cave in Asia at 50 km.
