= AP1 =

AP1 or AP-1 may refer to:

== Biology ==
- Activator protein 1, dimeric transcription factor
- Adaptor protein 1, tetrameric clathrin-associated complex

== Transportation ==
- Autopista AP-1, a Spanish motorway
- Caproni A.P.1, a 1934 Italian attack aircraft monoplane
- USS Henderson (AP-1)
- Honda S2000 (AP1), a sports car

== Other uses ==
- Protocol I, or AP 1, a 1977 amendment to the Geneva Conventions

== See also ==
- API (disambiguation)
