= Animal Protection Institute =

American non-profit organization

Animal Protection Institute logo

The Animal Protection Institute (API) was a national, nonprofit animal advocacy organization based in Sacramento, California that in 2007, as part of its affiliation with the Born Free Foundation, was renamed Born Free USA. Founded in 1968, API's mission was to advocate for the protection of animals from cruelty and exploitation. API's slogan was "Saving Animals Is Our Reason for Being".

API was founded by Belton P. Mouras and Kenneth E. Guerrero, both former employees of the Humane Society of the United States.

API's primary campaign areas included animals used in entertainment, captive exotic animals, companion animals, compassionate consumerism, farmed animals, and wildlife protection.

API achieved significant results in working with state and local legislatures to pass laws restricting the private possession of exotic animals such as lions, tigers, bears, and other dangerous animals. The organization attempted to get bills passed in North and South Carolina banning venomous snakes and other exotic animals.

API also provided "hands-on" care for animals at its API Primate Sanctuary, located in Dilley, Texas, where more than 500 primates, many of whom were rescued from abusive situations in laboratories, roadside zoos, and private possession, live in as natural an environment as possible with minimal human interference.
