= Mount Api =

Mountain in Malaysia

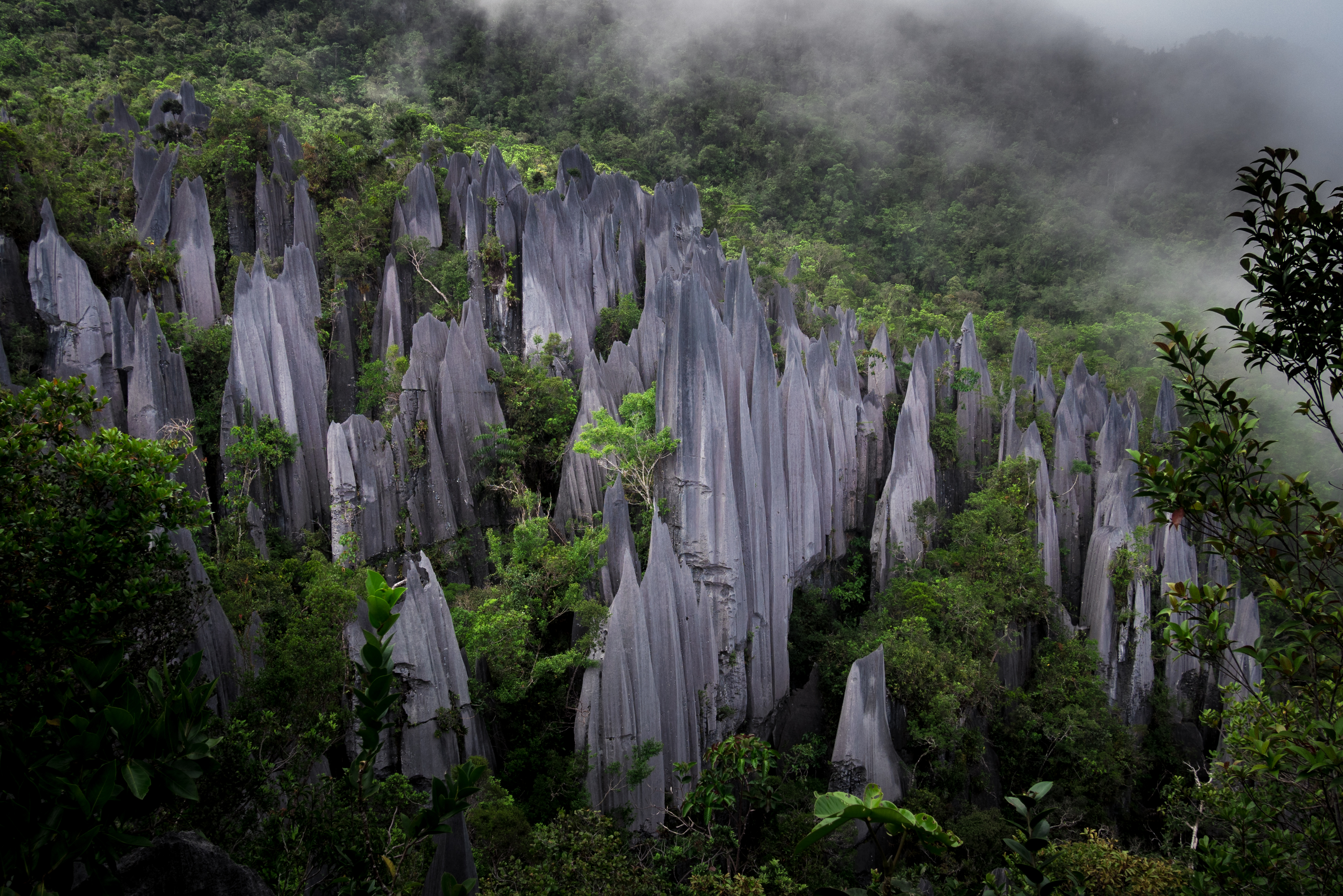
- The limestone pinnacles of Mount Api

Highest point
- Elevation: 1,750 m (5,740 ft)
- Coordinates: 04°06′07″N 114°53′35″E

Geography
- Location: Sarawak, Borneo

Mount Api (Malay: Gunung Api) is a limestone mountain located in Gunung Mulu National Park in Sarawak, Malaysia. Neighbouring Mount Benarat and Mount Buda are part of the same formation. Mount Api is famous for its striking limestone karst formations, commonly called "the pinnacles".

The mountain is host to many caves, with passages linking to the massive Clearwater Cave system. Api Chamber, the second-largest chamber in Malaysia, was discovered on Mount Api during the Benarat 2005 Caving Expedition.

Mount Api is notable for its pitcher plant diversity, which includes: Nepenthes faizaliana, N. fractiflexa, N. lowii, N. muluensis, N. tentaculata, N. veitchii, and N. vogelii.

== See also ==
- Penitente (snow formation)
- Stone Forest
- Tsingy
