= Academic Programs International =

Academic Programs International (API) is an independent study abroad provider based in the United States. Its locations include Argentina, Bhutan, Chile, China, Costa Rica, Croatia, Cuba, England, France, Germany, Hungary, Ireland, Italy, Mexico, Poland, Portugal, Qatar, Scotland, Spain, and the United Arab Emirates.

API offers international internships in Argentina, Chile, England, Ireland, and Spain on which participants have the opportunity to earn college credit.
