= Mount Benarat =

Mountain in Malaysia

Highest point
- Elevation: 1,858 m (6,096 ft)
- Coordinates: 04°08′46″N 114°55′06″E

Geography
- Location: Sarawak, Borneo

Mount Benarat (Malay: Gunung Benarat) is a mountain located in Gunung Mulu National Park in Sarawak, Malaysia, consisting of limestone on the western side which is overlain by gritstone on the eastern side. It contains many caves which have been discovered and explored by British and American cavers. The Benarat 2005 Caving Expedition discovered Moon Cave after climbing 60 m up the cliffs on the southern end of the mountain. On the eastern side, the Headhunter's Trail leads from the Melinau River to the mouth of the Terikan River at the Medalam River. Neighbouring Mount Buda and Mount Api are part of the same formation, separated from Mount Benarat by the Medalam and Melinau Rivers, respectively. It is also home to Benarat Cavern.
