= Indonesian Women's Alliance =

Political group in Indonesia

The Indonesian Women's Alliance (IWA), known in Indonesia as the Aliansi Perempuan Indonesia (API), is a political group comprising 90 Indonesian women's organisations and movements, along with a number of civil society groups such as trade unions, human rights organisations, and indigenous peoples in Indonesia. It includes Perempuan Mahardhika,

On 25 March 2025, the IWA/API joined the joined the 2025 Indonesian protests in the capital city, Jakarta, demanding that the Dewan Perwakilan Rakyat (House of Representatives) withdraw the 2025 revision of the armed forces law. The group has denounced violence perpetrated by the police and military, and defended the right to protest peacefully.

On 3 September 2025, around 300 women dressed in bright pink and bearing broomsticks marched to the Indonesian parliament building. The colour represents courage, while the IWA/API adopted the broomstick as a symbol to "sweep away the dirt of the state, militarism, and police repression". As of September 2025 the group is still taking an active part in the protests.
