= UCSI University, Sarawak Campus =

Malaysian University

- Motto: Future - Proof Yourself
- Type: Private
- Established: 2008
- Chancellor: Tan Sri Datuk Seri Panglima Dr. Abdul Rahman Arshad
- Vice-Chancellor: Senior Professor Dato' Dr Khalid Yusoff
- Location: Isthmus, Kuching, Sarawak, Malaysia
- Website: www.ucsiuniversity.edu.my

UCSI University, Sarawak Campus is a branch of the UCSI University private university located in Sarawak, Malaysia that houses the Faculty of Hospitality & Management, Faculty of Business & Information Science and Centre for Pre-U Studies. The campus hosts a student population of over 500.

== History ==
UCSI University was established in 1986. Originally the Canadian Institute of Computer Studies, the school has evolved with accreditation. In 1990, it became Sedaya College, later Sedaya International College. In 2003 it became University College Sedaya International (UCSI), and in 2008 when it became a full university was renamed UCSI University. UCSI University has three (4) campuses, namely KL Campus, Sarawak Campus, Terengganu Campus, and Bangladesh Campus.

UCSI University Sarawak Campus, situated in Kuching, Sarawak, this Campus provides a dynamic and stimulating environment in which to study hospitality, tourism, events management, retailing, industrial relations and international business. The Sarawak Campus is strongly linked with the industry's best such as Marina Bay Sands Singapore, Hard Rock Hotel, Bolton Hotel in New Zealand, Hokkaido Tracks Resort Properties in Japan, and Resort Worldwide, the Borneo Convention Centre Kuching, the Sarawak Tourism Board and many more. This ensures that courses run remain highly relevant to today's demands in the hospitality industry to allow for the development of skills that guarantee these graduates worldwide employment.

UCSI University Sarawak Campus housed 3 major faculties. There are Faculty of Hospitality and Tourism, Faculty of Business and Information Science and Centre for Pre-U Studies.

In support of the state's rapidly developing hospitality and tourism industry, UCSI University Kuching's own expansion plans are already underway to build a campus and hotel at the mega Kuching Isthmus development site. The UCSI Education Precinct and the UCSI City Island Hotel will be built on 25.5 acres of land, all within the vicinity of the famed Borneo Convention Centre.

== Co-Operative Education Training Programme ==
UCSI's Co-Operative Education Training Programme, established in 2004, collaborates with over 700 employer organisations to provide work experience to students during their years of education. For each year at UCSI, students work for at least two months. The university also hooks up the students with many organisations in the hospitality and tourism industry for part-time stints.

== See also ==
- List of universities in Malaysia
