= Clearwater Cave system =

Cave system in Malaysia

Clearwater Cave System
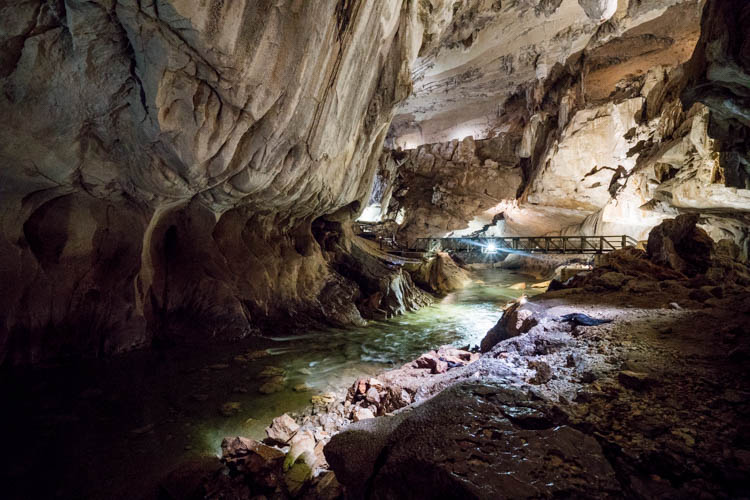
- Interior of the Clearwater Cave

- Location within Malaysia
- Location: Gunung Mulu National Park, Sarawak
- Coordinates: 04°03′54″N 114°49′53″E
- Length: 265.882 km (165.211 mi)
- Height variation: 553.41 m (1,815.6 ft)
- Discovery: See list: Clearwater Cave (1978); Lady's Cave (connected in 1978); Cleartop Cave (connected in 1978); Wind Cave (connected in 1988); Drunken Forest (connected in 1990); Blackrock Cave (connected in 1991); Leopard Cave (connected in 1991); Whiterock Cave (connected in 2005)
- Difficulty: Advanced - connection to Wind Cave; Intermediate - access to underground river
- Access: Public (Clearwater cave), Restricted (underground rivers and connections)
- Show cave opened: 1985
- Features: Top 10 longest cave passage in the world
- Website: Official website Mulu Caves Project website

The Clearwater Cave System (Malay: Gua Air Jernih) in Gunung Mulu National Park, Sarawak, Malaysia is believed to be one of the world's largest interconnected cave systems by volume and it is the 7th longest at 265.882 km (165.211 mi) (Nov 2025). The system lies mainly under the western margins of Gunung Api between the Melinau Gorge and Cave of the Winds.

The first exploration by speleologists was during the 1977/78 Royal Geographical Society Mulu Sarawak Expedition when 24 km (15 mi) of the cave passage were surveyed. Many expeditions have increased the explored length and will continue to do so for the foreseeable future.

The cave's water is clear, completely see-through. It originates from mountain springs and can be drunk without filters. Swimming in the water is authorized when fluvial discharges are low. The cave's water flows in to the Melinau River.

There has been expeditions to find a connection between this cave and the Racer Cave (Racer-Easter system) because such a connection would make the whole subterranean complex one of the largest in the planet.

== See also ==
- List of longest caves
