= Kenong Rimba Park =

Protected rainforest park

Kenong Rimba Park is a protected rainforest area in Kuala Lipis, Pahang, Malaysia, which borders on Taman Negara. The park covers 128 km^{2}. Available activities include caving, jungle trekking, night walking, hill climbing, bird and animal observation.

THE PARK AT A GLANCE:

- Size: 128 km^{2}.
- Flora Fauna: The park is a natural habitat for a host of flora which include orchids, "pokok Ara," and parasitic plants which thrive among the branches of the gigantic trees. It is also the home of numerous varieties of birds like the merbah, pigeons and merbuk to name a few. Nearby, water-lilies of multi-hued profusion grace the serene water of the padi-fields. Mammalian life includes the mouse-deer, porcupine and possibly elephants, too.
- Activities: Caving, jungle walks, mountain climbing, swimming, picnicking, fishing.
