= Sarawak Chamber =

Large cave chamber in Malaysia

Coordinates: 4.071895°N 114.876823°E

Sarawak Chamber is the largest known cave chamber in the world by area and the second largest by volume after the Miao Room in China. It is in Gua Nasib Bagus (Good Luck Cave), which is located in Gunung Mulu National Park in the Malaysian territory of Sarawak on the island of Borneo.

== Discovery ==
The chamber was discovered by three British cavers, Andy Eavis, Dave Checkley and Tony White, in January 1981 during the Mulu'80 Expedition. The story of how it was discovered is told in the books Underground Worlds and Giant Caves of Borneo.

Later named Sarawak Chamber, it measures 600 metres (2,000 ft) long, 435 metres (1,427 ft) wide and a maximum of 115 metres (377 ft) high, and was estimated as three times the size of the Big Room in Carlsbad Caverns National Park, New Mexico, then thought to be the largest underground chamber. Its volume and area were checked by laser scanning in 2011 and were found to be 9,579,205 cubic metres (338,286,400 cu ft) and 164,459 square metres (1,770,220 sq ft) respectively.

To reach Sarawak Chamber, one must follow a river upstream from the cave entrance. This long passage has a roof up to 60 metres (200 ft) high, and may require some swimming and a traversal along a ledge. Accompanied visits can be arranged by the national Park.

== Geology and formation ==
Sarawak Chamber is formed in Melinau Limestone, a reef complex of Upper Eocene to Early Miocene age. It was formed by karstic solutional processes in addition to the erosion of its sandstone basement. Its exceptional area is thought to be the result of the stability provided by the structure of the rocks in which it lies, dipping strata forming an anticline flank close to a syncline axis.

== Fiction ==
The feeling of agoraphobia experienced by one of the discoverers is referenced in the novel House of Leaves by Mark Z. Danielewski.
