= Coleophora ballotella =

Scientific classification
- Kingdom: Animalia
- Phylum: Arthropoda
- Class: Insecta
- Order: Lepidoptera
- Family: Coleophoridae
- Genus: Coleophora
- Species: C. ballotella

Binomial name
- Coleophora ballotella (Fischer v. Röslerstamm, 1839)

Synonyms
- Ornix ballotella Fischer v. Röslerstamm, 1839; Multicoloria alexinschiella Nemes, 2004

Species of moth

Coleophora ballotella is a moth of the family Coleophoridae. It is found from Germany, Poland and the Baltic States to the Iberian Peninsula, Italy and Greece. It has also been recorded from northern and southern Russia.

The larvae feed on Ballota nigra, Lamium amplexicaule, Leonurus, Marrubium peregrinum, Marrubium vulgare, Stachys officinalis and Teucrium chamaedrys. Full-grown larvae can be found in June and July.
