= Wheeleria obsoletus =

Scientific classification
- Kingdom: Animalia
- Phylum: Arthropoda
- Class: Insecta
- Order: Lepidoptera
- Family: Pterophoridae
- Genus: Wheeleria
- Species: W. obsoletus

Binomial name
- Wheeleria obsoletus (Zeller, 1841)

Synonyms
- List: Pterophorus obsoletus Zeller, 1841; Wheeleria obsoleta; Merrifieldia obsoletus; Pterophorus desertorum Zeller 1867; Pterophorus desertorium; Pterophorus subalternans Lederer, 1870; Alucita gonoscia Meyrick, 1922; Alucita phlomidactylus Wasserthal, 1970; Alucita marrubii Wasserthal, 1970; Aciptilus confusus Herrich-Schäffer, 1855

Species of plume moth

Wheeleria obsoletus is a moth of the family Pterophoridae. It is found in France, Italy, Austria, Sardinia, Sicily, the Czech Republic, Slovakia, Hungary, Croatia, Bosnia and Herzegovina, North Macedonia, Greece, Bulgaria, Romania, Ukraine, Belarus, Russia, Cyprus, Turkmenistan, Asia Minor and western Asia.

Adults are on wing from April (the Palestinian Territories) or the end of May (Europe) to August in one generation per year.

The larvae feed on black horehound (Ballota nigra), common horehound (Marrubium vulgare) and horehound (Marrubium peregrinum).
