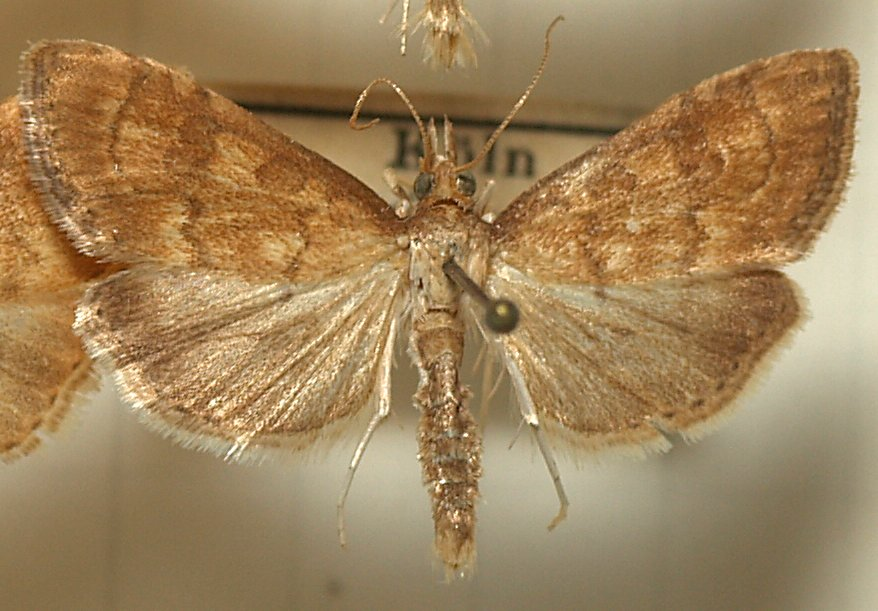
- Mounted specimen

Scientific classification
- Kingdom: Animalia
- Phylum: Arthropoda
- Clade: Pancrustacea
- Class: Insecta
- Order: Lepidoptera
- Family: Crambidae
- Genus: Udea
- Species: U. fulvalis

Binomial name
- Udea fulvalis (Hübner, 1809)

Synonyms
- Pyralis fulvalis Hübner, 1809; Botys fulvalis var. prunoidalis Staudinger, 1879; Pionea fulvalis orientalis Filipjev, 1927

= Udea fulvalis =

Species of moth

Udea fulvalis is a species of moth of the family Crambidae. It was first described by Jacob Hübner in 1809.

== Etymology ==
The species name fulvalis derives from the Latin fulvus, meaning fulvous.

== Distribution ==
This species can be found in most of Europe.

== Description ==
Udea fulvalis has a wingspan measuring between 24 and 29 mm. The uppersides of the forewings of these moths show a fulvous brown or yellowish-brown colouration, with darker markings. Larvae are pale green, with a black head.

Adults of this species are rather similar to Ebulea crocealis and Udea prunalis.

== Biology ==
Adults are on wing in one generation a year (univoltine species) from June to late August, depending on location. They preferably fly at night, when they come to light.

The larvae mainly feed on a variety of plants of the family Lamiaceae (Ballota, Nepeta and Salvia pratensis, etc.), but also on Cornus and Lychnis. They pupate in a cocoon amongst leaves of the host plants.
