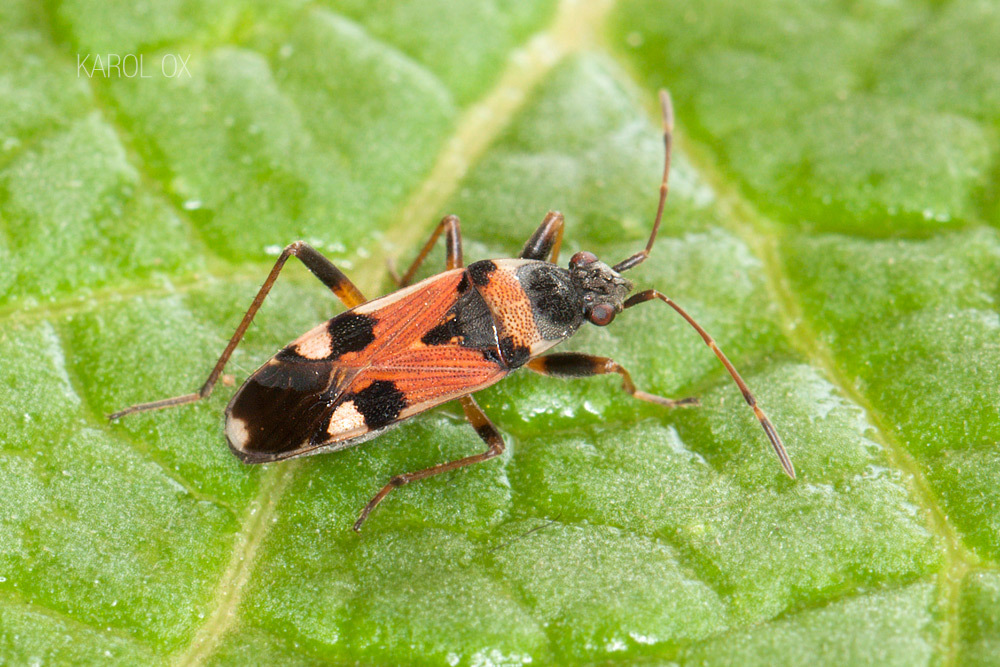
- Beosus quadripunctatus, Slovakia

Scientific classification
- Kingdom: Animalia
- Phylum: Arthropoda
- Clade: Pancrustacea
- Class: Insecta
- Order: Hemiptera
- Suborder: Heteroptera
- Family: Rhyparochromidae
- Subfamily: Rhyparochrominae
- Tribe: Rhyparochromini
- Genus: Beosus
- Species: B. quadripunctatus

Binomial name
- Beosus quadripunctatus (Müller, 1766)

= Beosus quadripunctatus =

Species of dirt-colored seed bug

Beosus quadripunctatus is a species of dirt-colored seed bug in the family Rhyparochromidae, found in Europe and west Asia.

== Subspecies ==
These two subspecies belong to the species Beosus quadripunctatus:

- Beosus quadripunctatus nigripes Tamanini, 1946
- Beosus quadripunctatus quadripunctatus (Müller, 1766)

== Biology ==
This species is detritivorous and is known to be associated with the plants Cytisus scoparius, Silene sp., Erica arborea, Calluna vulgaris, Ballota sp., Veronica sp., Prunus avium and Tamarix sp.
