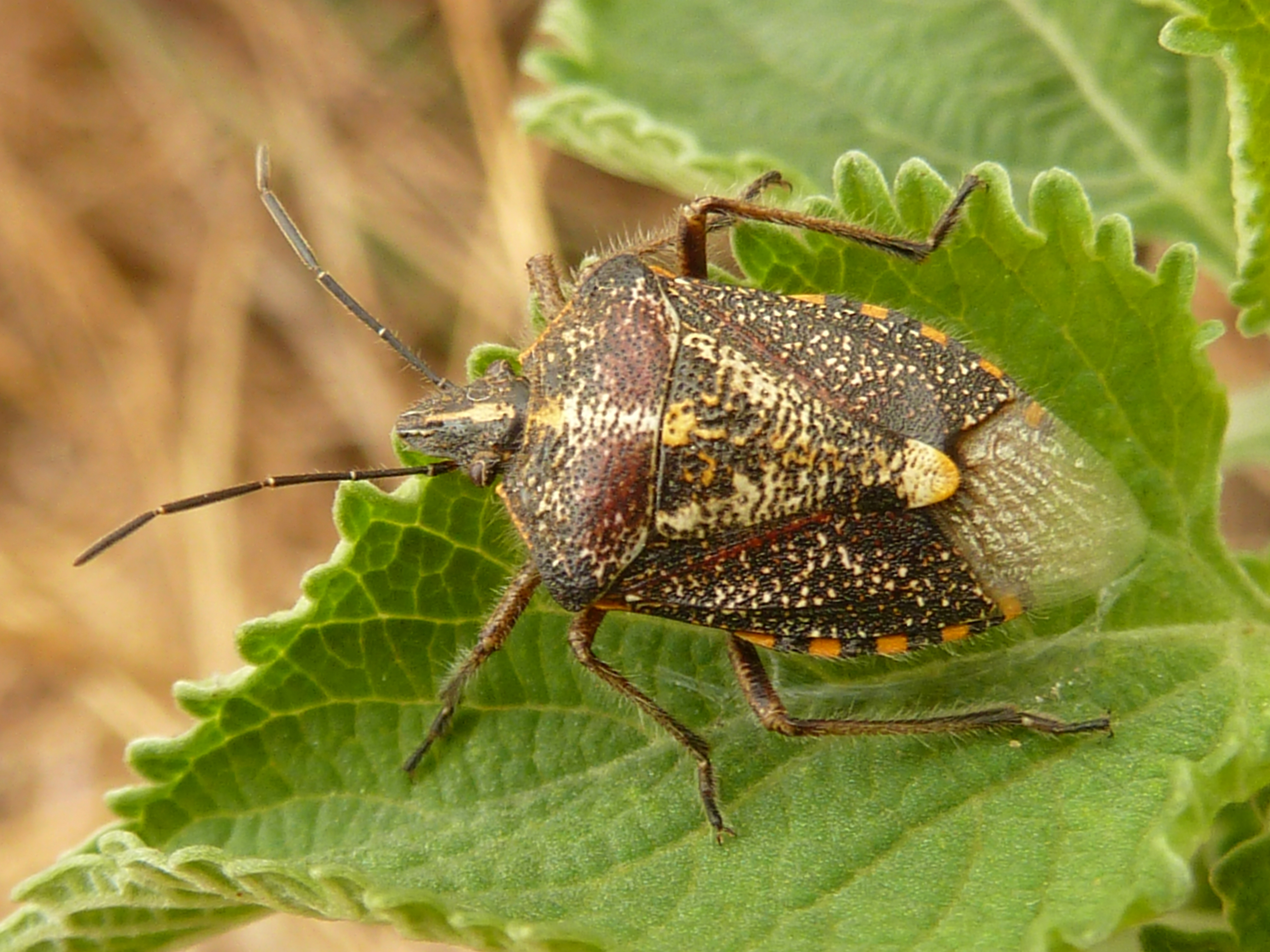
- A. erosa in South Africa

Scientific classification
- Domain: Eukaryota
- Kingdom: Animalia
- Phylum: Arthropoda
- Class: Insecta
- Order: Hemiptera
- Suborder: Heteroptera
- Family: Pentatomidae
- Subfamily: Pentatominae
- Tribe: Agonoscelidini
- Genus: Agonoscelis; Spinola, 1837

= Agonoscelis =

Genus of true bugs

Agonoscelis is a genus of shield bugs, in the monotypic tribe Agonoscelidini, that are native to the Afrotropics and Australia, but one species is established in the New World. Some species are minor or considerable pests.

They have five nymphal stages, and are 8 to 12 mm long as adults. They attack (or control) weeds and herbs including horehound, thyme, flax and cotton, or the developing seeds of sunflowers or cereals like millet or sorghum. They may swarm on a variety of other shrubs and trees, including coffee and cacao. The scent gland is located at the end of the abdomen.

== Species ==
There are some 19 to 22 species, which include:

- Agonoscelis erosa (Westwood, 1837)
  - A. e. atropurpurea Schumacher, 1913
- Agonoscelis femoralis Walker, 1868
- Agonoscelis nubila F. – Flower head bug
- Agonoscelis puberula Stål, 1853 – African cluster bug (established in New World)
- Agonoscelis pubescens (Thunb.) – Andat bug, Sudan dura bug, Pentatomid sorghum bug, African cluster bug, syn. A. versicolor (Fabricius, 1794)
- Agonoscelis rutila (Fabricius, 1775) – Horehound bug
- Agonoscelis versicoloratus (Turton) – Sunflower seed bug
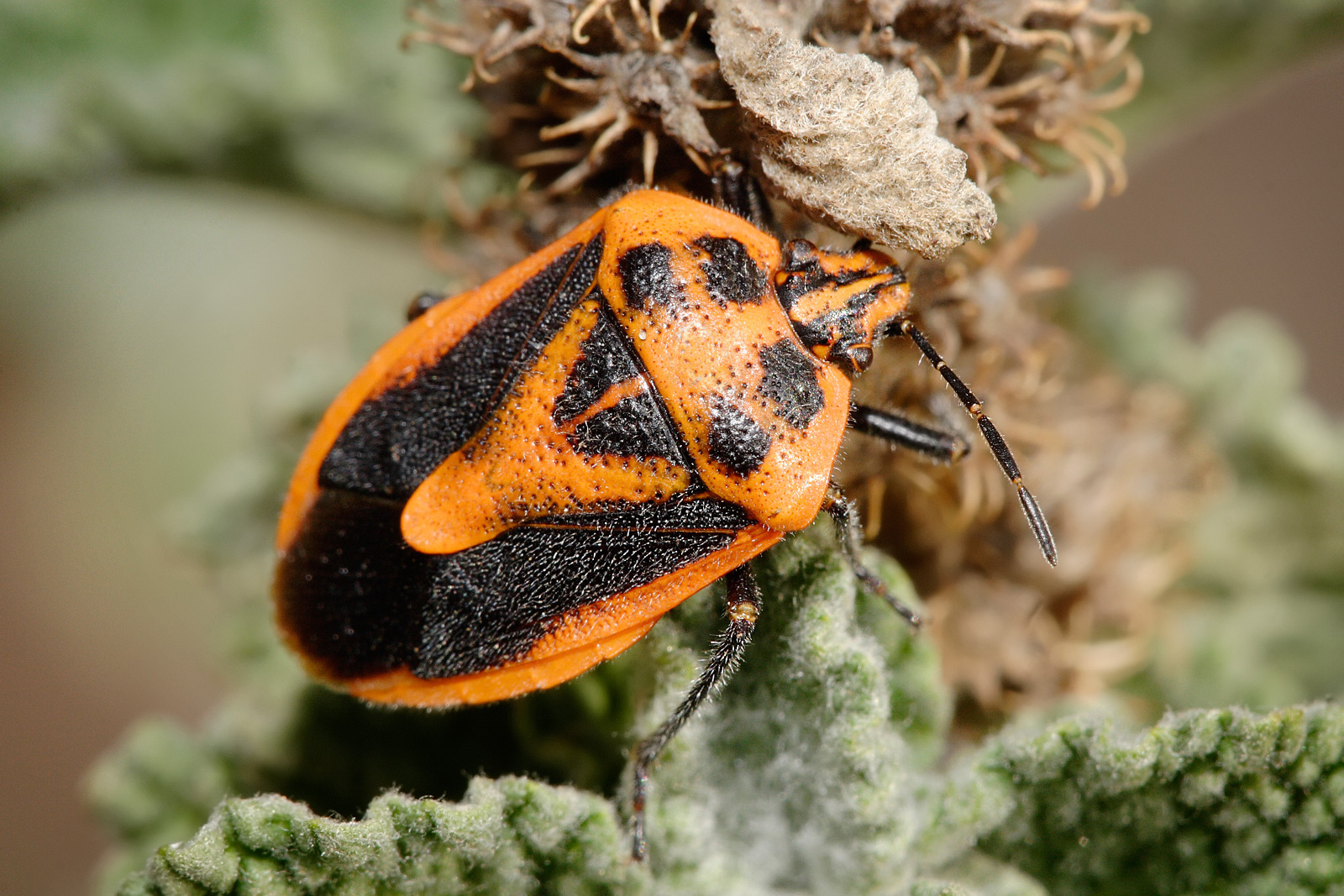
A. rutila

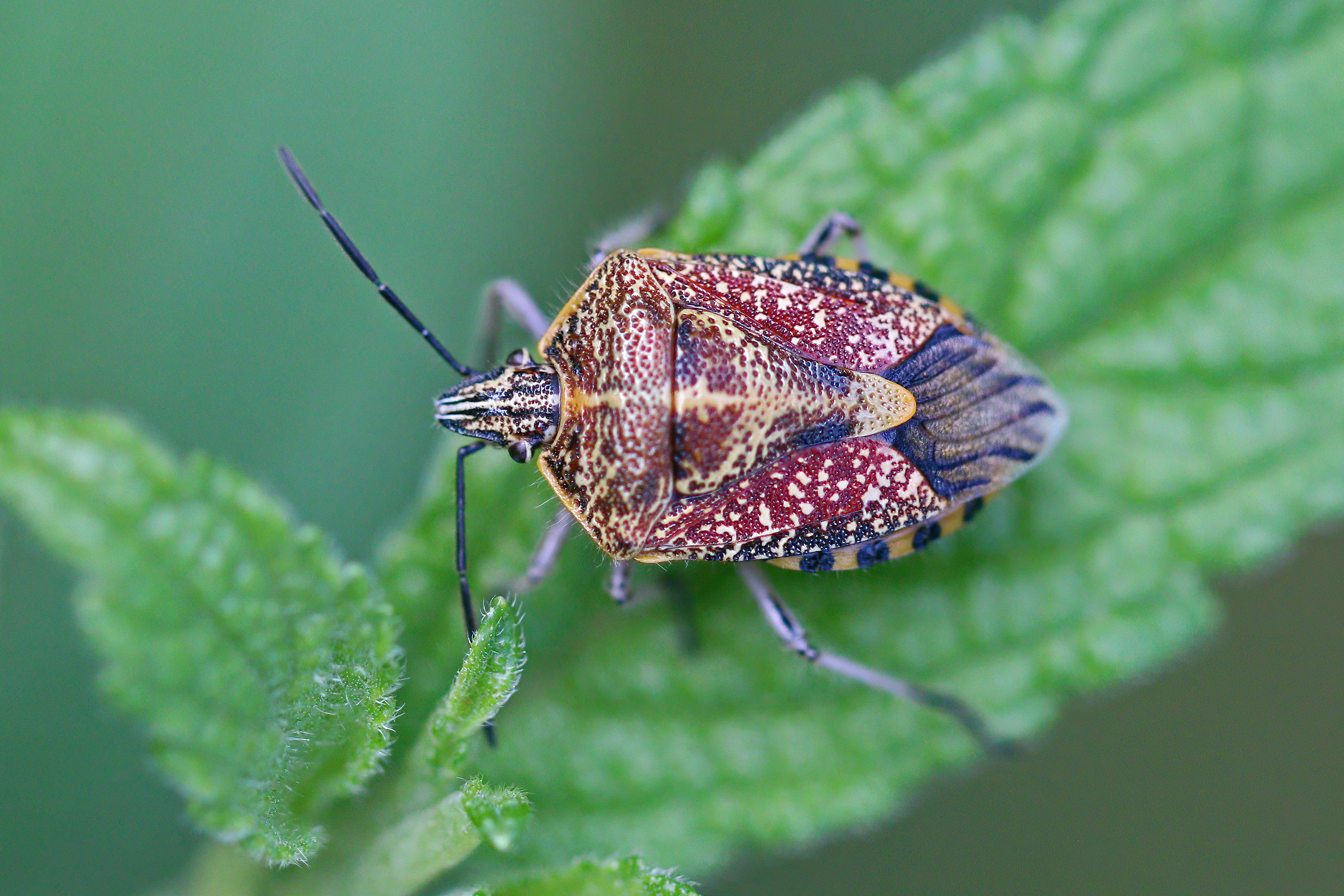
A. versicoloratus
