= Nanton Summer Root Beer =

Root beer brand

Nanton Summer Root Beer is a root beer brand produced in Canada by Nanton Water & Soda Ltd.
