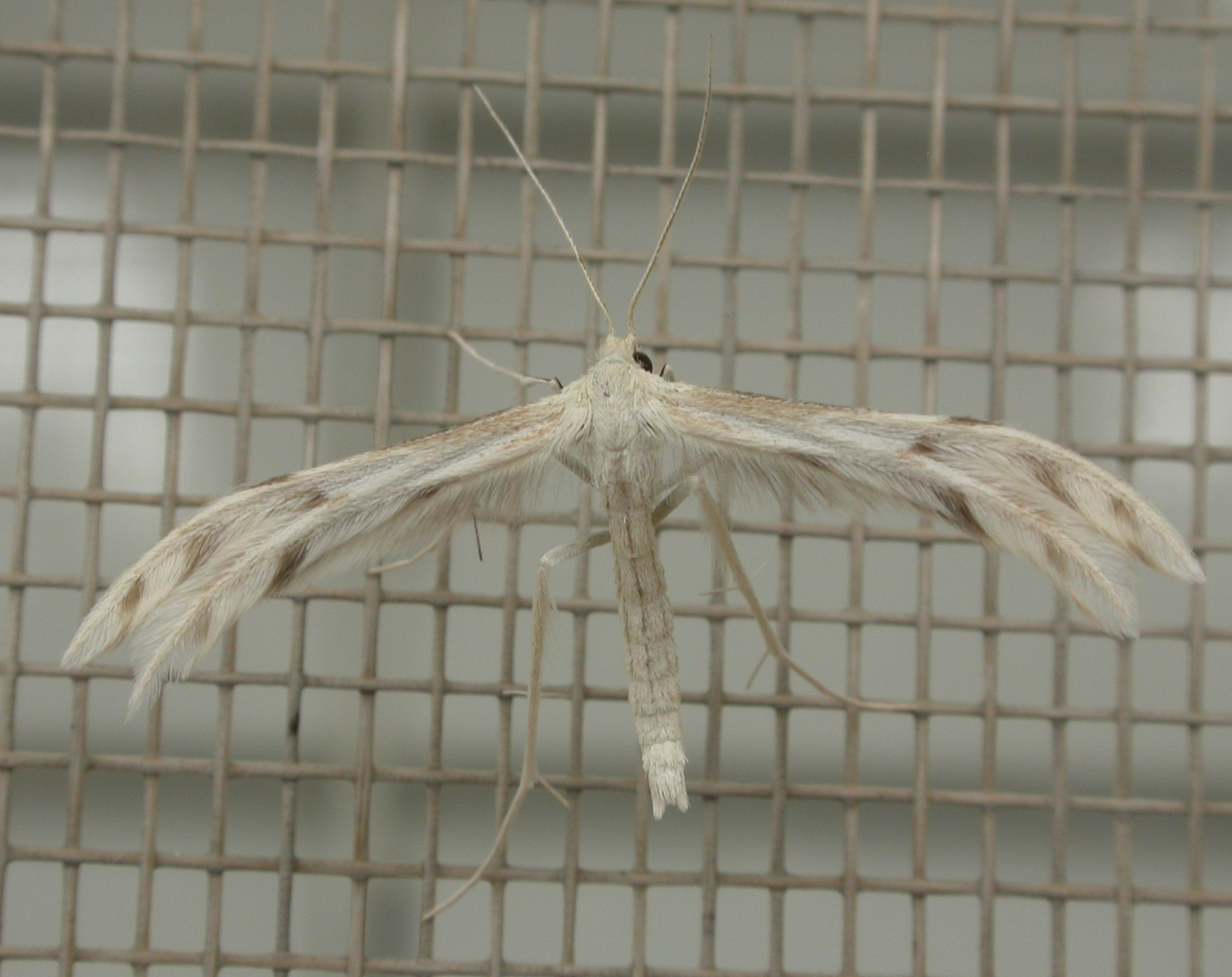

Scientific classification
- Kingdom: Animalia
- Phylum: Arthropoda
- Class: Insecta
- Order: Lepidoptera
- Family: Pterophoridae
- Genus: Wheeleria
- Species: W. spilodactylus

Binomial name
- Wheeleria spilodactylus Curtis, 1827

Synonyms
- Pterophorus spilodactylus; Aciptilus confusus

= Wheeleria spilodactylus =

Species of plume moth

Wheeleria spilodactylus, the horehound plume moth, is a moth of the family Pterophoridae, first described by John Curtis in 1827. It is found in South-Western and Central Europe and the Mediterranean, Asia Minor and North Africa. It has been introduced to Australia and New Zealand (in 2018 by Manaaki Whenua - Landcare Research) as a biocontrol agent for white horehound (Marrubium vulgare).

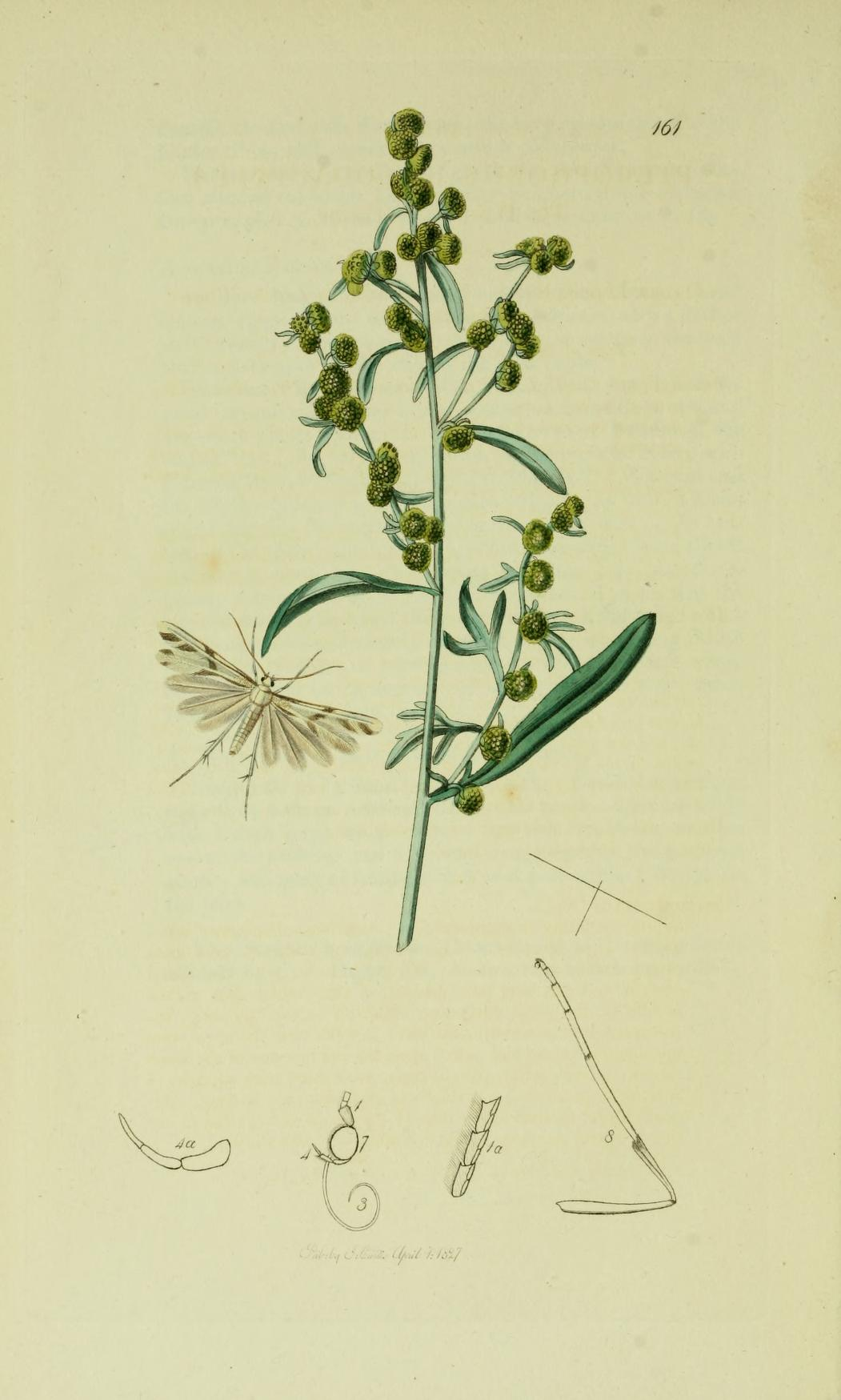
Illustration from John Curtis's British Entomology Volume 6

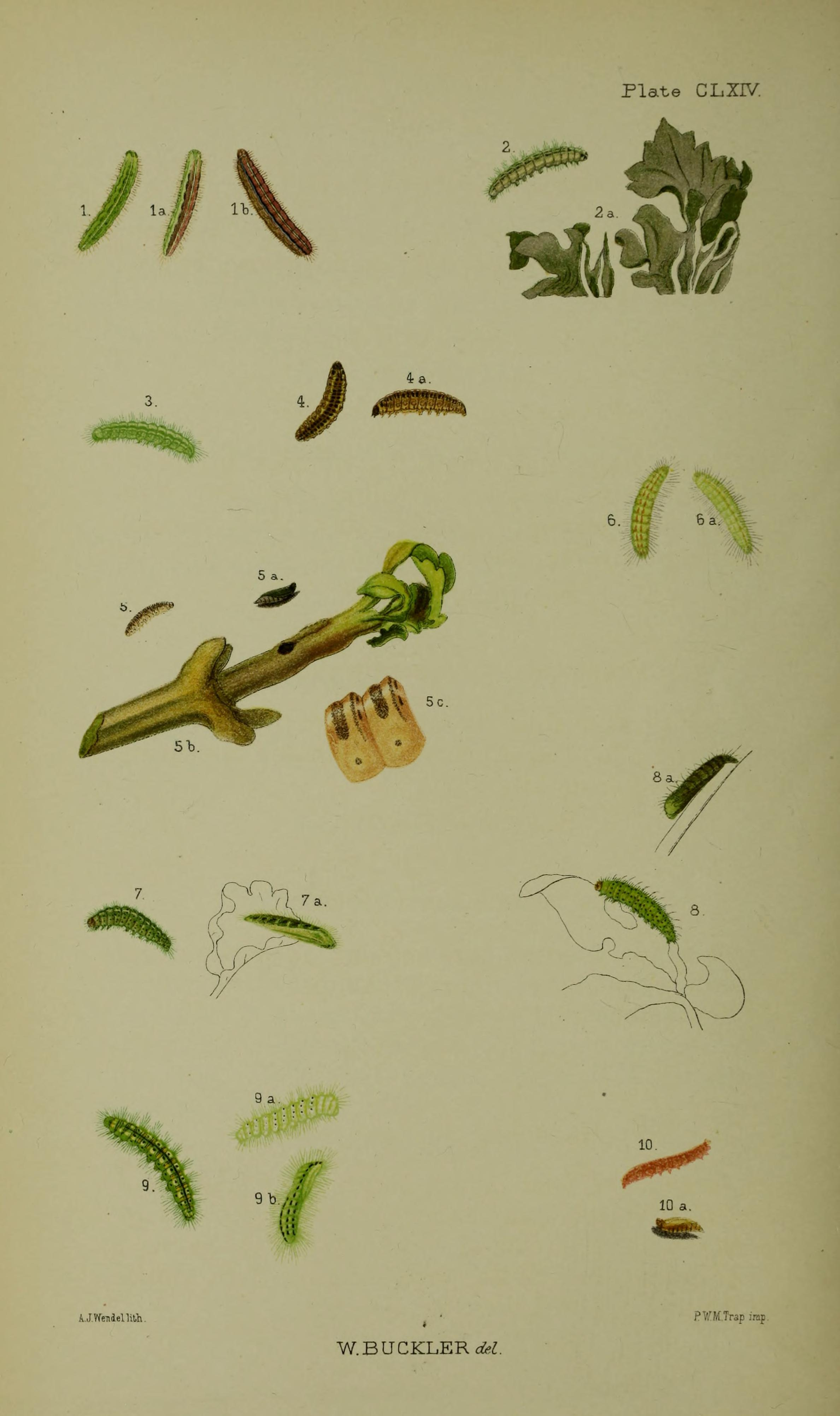
Depicted in William Buckler The larvæ of the British butterflies and moths 1901 Fig. 7 larva after final moult 7a pupa

The wingspan is 20–25 millimetres (0.79–0.98 in). Adults are on wing from July to September depending on the location.

The difficult to see larvae feed on black horehound (Ballota nigra) and white horehound.
