= Wheeleria leptopsamma =

Scientific classification
- Kingdom: Animalia
- Phylum: Arthropoda
- Class: Insecta
- Order: Lepidoptera
- Family: Pterophoridae
- Genus: Wheeleria
- Species: W. leptopsamma

Binomial name
- Wheeleria leptopsamma (Meyrick, 1925)

Synonyms
- Alucita leptopsamma Meyrick, 1925; Pterophorus leptopsamma Meyrick, 1925

Species of plume moth

Wheeleria leptopsamma is a moth of the family Pterophoridae that is endemic to Egypt. It was described by Edward Meyrick in 1925.
