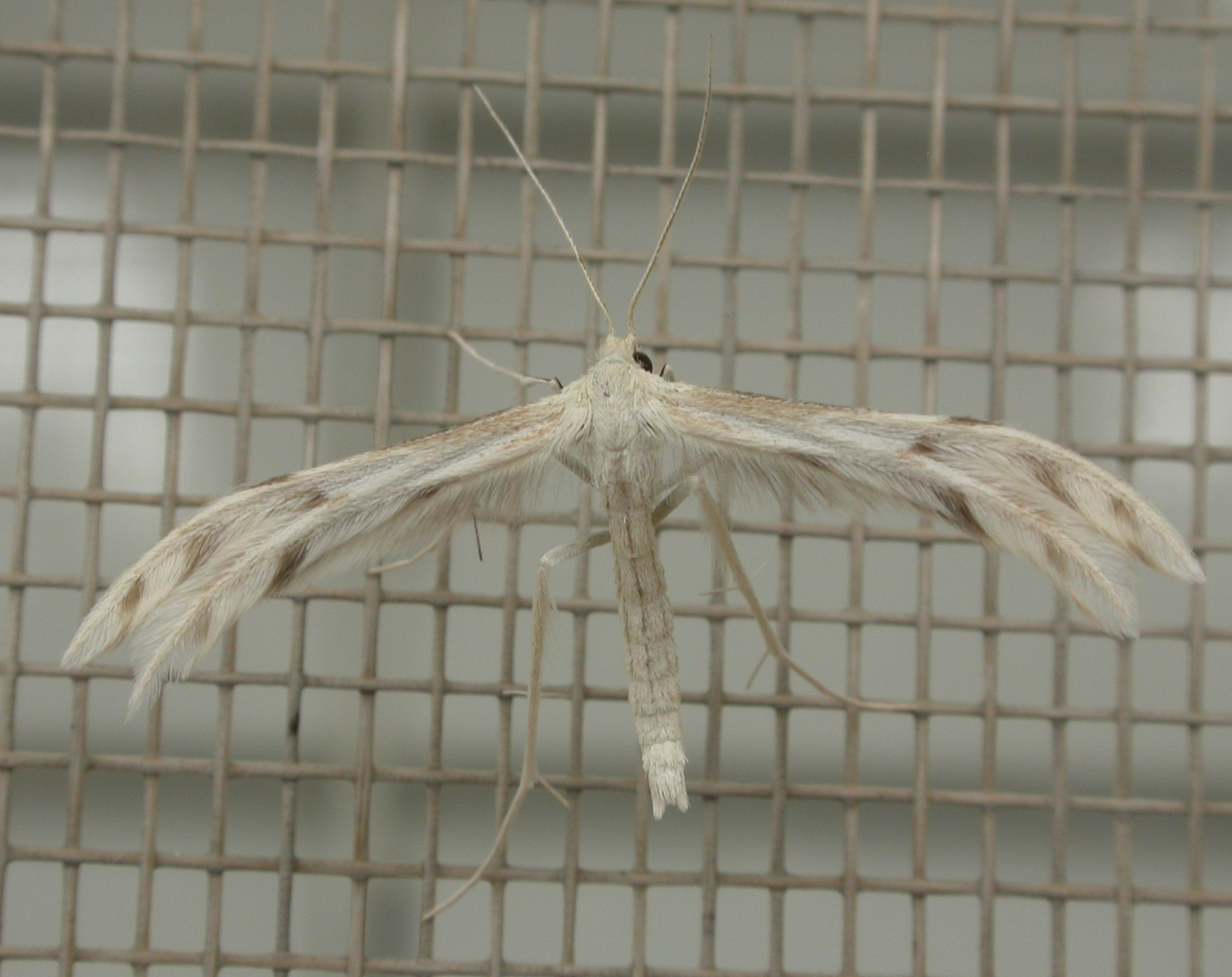
- Wheeleria spilodactylus

Scientific classification
- Kingdom: Animalia
- Phylum: Arthropoda
- Class: Insecta
- Order: Lepidoptera
- Family: Pterophoridae
- Subfamily: Pterophorinae
- Tribe: Pterophorini
- Genus: Wheeleria; Tutt, 1905

= Wheeleria =

Genus of moths

Wheeleria is a genus of moths in the family Pterophoridae.

== Species ==
- Wheeleria elbursi Arenberger, 1981
- Wheeleria ivae (Kasy, 1960)
- Wheeleria kabuli (Arenberger, 1981)
- Wheeleria kasachstanica Arenberger, 1995
- Wheeleria leptopsamma (Meyrick, 1925)
- Wheeleria lyrae (Arenberger, 1983)
- Wheeleria obsoletus (Zeller, 1841)
- Wheeleria parviflorellus (Arenberger, 1981)
- Wheeleria phlomidis (Staudinger, 1870)
- Wheeleria raphiodactyla (Rebel, 1900)
- Wheeleria sobeidae (Arenberger, 1981)
- Wheeleria spilodactylus (Curtis, 1827)
