= Wheeleria kasachstanica =

Scientific classification
- Kingdom: Animalia
- Phylum: Arthropoda
- Clade: Pancrustacea
- Class: Insecta
- Order: Lepidoptera
- Family: Pterophoridae
- Genus: Wheeleria
- Species: W. kasachstanica

Binomial name
- Wheeleria kasachstanica Arenberger, 1995

Synonyms
- Wheeleria orophila Gibeaux, 1997

Species of plume moth

Wheeleria kasachstanica is a moth of the family Pterophoridae that is endemic to Kazakhstan.
