= Wheeleria sobeidae =

Scientific classification
- Kingdom: Animalia
- Phylum: Arthropoda
- Class: Insecta
- Order: Lepidoptera
- Family: Pterophoridae
- Genus: Wheeleria
- Species: W. sobeidae

Binomial name
- Wheeleria sobeidae (Arenberger, 1981)

Synonyms
- Pterophorus sobeidae Arenberger, 1981

Species of plume moth

Wheeleria sobeidae is a moth of the family Pterophoridae. It is found in Iran, Afghanistan and Turkey.

The wingspan is 16–25 millimetres (0.63–0.98 in). The wings, head, thorax and abdomen are dirty white.
