= Wheeleria ivae =

Scientific classification
- Kingdom: Animalia
- Phylum: Arthropoda
- Class: Insecta
- Order: Lepidoptera
- Family: Pterophoridae
- Genus: Wheeleria
- Species: W. ivae

Binomial name
- Wheeleria ivae (Kasy, 1960)

Synonyms
- Aciptilia ivae Kasy, 1960

Species of plume moth

Wheeleria ivae is a species of moth in the family Pterophoridae, known from former Yugoslavia, Asia Minor, Syria and Lebanon.

The larvae feed on Stachys iva.
