= Wheeleria raphiodactyla =

Scientific classification
- Kingdom: Animalia
- Phylum: Arthropoda
- Class: Insecta
- Order: Lepidoptera
- Family: Pterophoridae
- Genus: Wheeleria
- Species: W. raphiodactyla

Binomial name
- Wheeleria raphiodactyla (Rebel, 1901)

Synonyms
- Aciptilia raphiodactyla Rebel, 1901

Species of plume moth

Wheeleria raphiodactyla is a moth of the family Pterophoridae. It is found in Portugal, Spain and France.

The wingspan is 22–24 millimetres (0.87–0.94 in).
