= Wheeleria kabuli =

Scientific classification
- Kingdom: Animalia
- Phylum: Arthropoda
- Class: Insecta
- Order: Lepidoptera
- Family: Pterophoridae
- Genus: Wheeleria
- Species: W. kabuli

Binomial name
- Wheeleria kabuli (Arenberger, 1981)

Synonyms
- Pterophorus kabuli Arenberger, 1981

Species of plume moth

Wheeleria kabuli is a moth of the family Pterophoridae that is found in Afghanistan. It was described by Ernst Arenberger in 1981.
