= Wheeleria elbursi =

Scientific classification
- Kingdom: Animalia
- Phylum: Arthropoda
- Class: Insecta
- Order: Lepidoptera
- Family: Pterophoridae
- Genus: Wheeleria
- Species: W. elbursi

Binomial name
- Wheeleria elbursi (Arenberger, 1981)

Synonyms
- Pterophorus elbursi Arenberger, 1981

Species of plume moth

Wheeleria elbursi is a moth of the family Pterophoridae. It is found in Iran (including the Elburs Mountains) and Tukey.

The wingspan is 19–25 millimetres (0.75–0.98 in). The wings, head, thorax and abdomen are dirty white.
