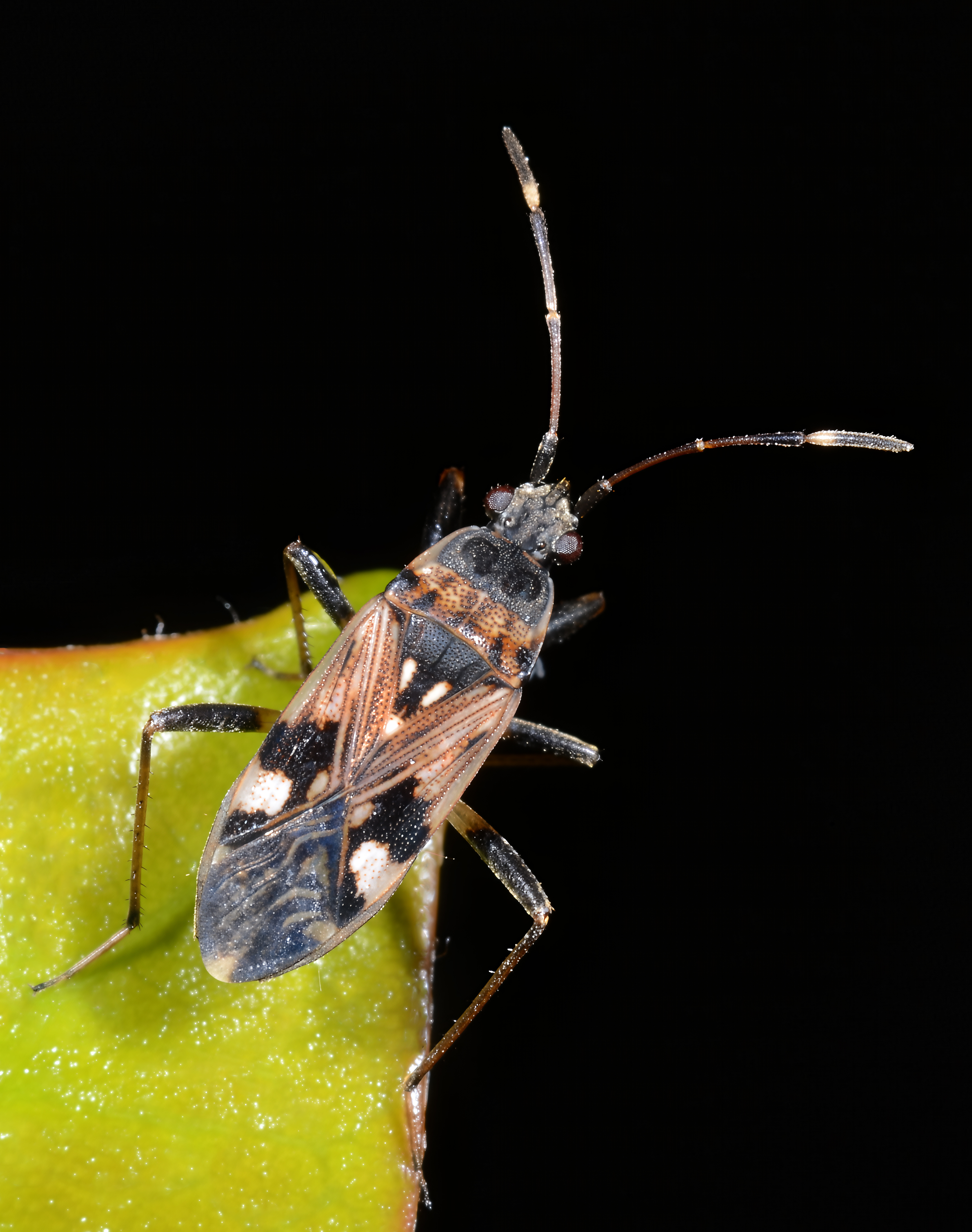
- Beosus maritimus

Scientific classification
- Kingdom: Animalia
- Phylum: Arthropoda
- Class: Insecta
- Order: Hemiptera
- Suborder: Heteroptera
- Family: Rhyparochromidae
- Subfamily: Rhyparochrominae
- Tribe: Rhyparochromini
- Genus: Beosus; Amyot & Serville, 1843

= Beosus =

Genus of insects

Beosus is a genus of dirt-colored seed bugs in the family Rhyparochromidae. There are at least four described species in Beosus.

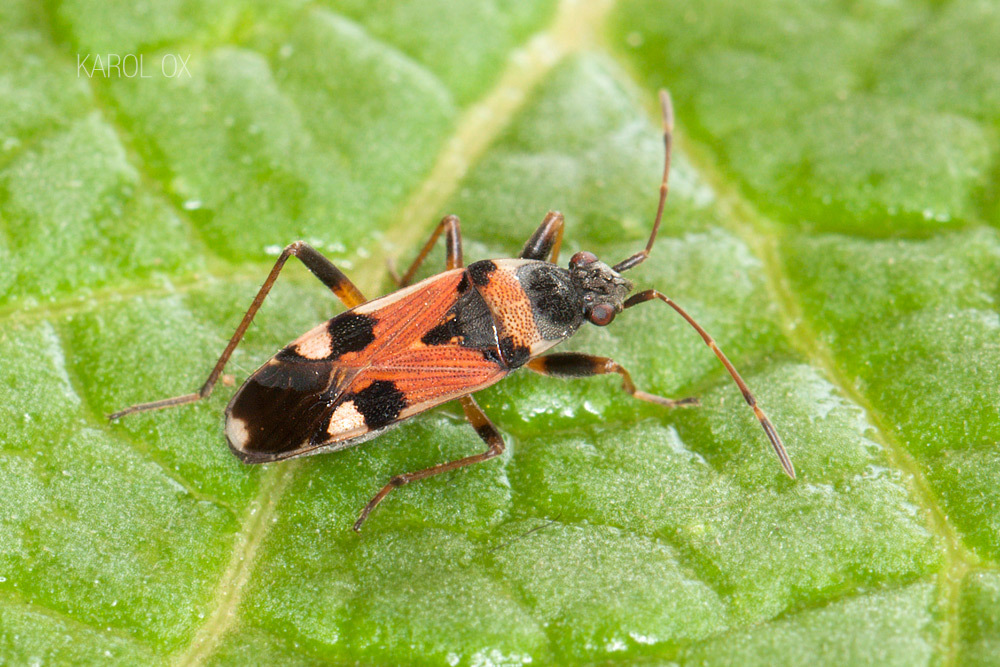
Beosus quadripunctatus, Slovensko

== Species ==
These four species belong to the genus Beosus:

- Beosus flexuosus Montrouzier, 1865
- Beosus laevicollis Montrouzier, 1865
- Beosus maritimus (Scopoli, 1763)
- Beosus quadripunctatus (Muller, 1766)
