= Wheeleria parviflorellus =

Scientific classification
- Kingdom: Animalia
- Phylum: Arthropoda
- Class: Insecta
- Order: Lepidoptera
- Family: Pterophoridae
- Genus: Wheeleria
- Species: W. parviflorellus

Binomial name
- Wheeleria parviflorellus (Arenberger, 1981)

Synonyms
- Pterophorus parviflorellus Arenberger, 1981

Species of plume moth

Wheeleria parviflorellus is a moth of the family Pterophoridae that is found in Afghanistan. It was described by Ernst Arenberger in 1981.

The wingspan is 16–22 millimetres (0.63–0.87 in). The ground colour is white. Adults are on wing from May to July.

The larvae feed on Stachys parviflora.
