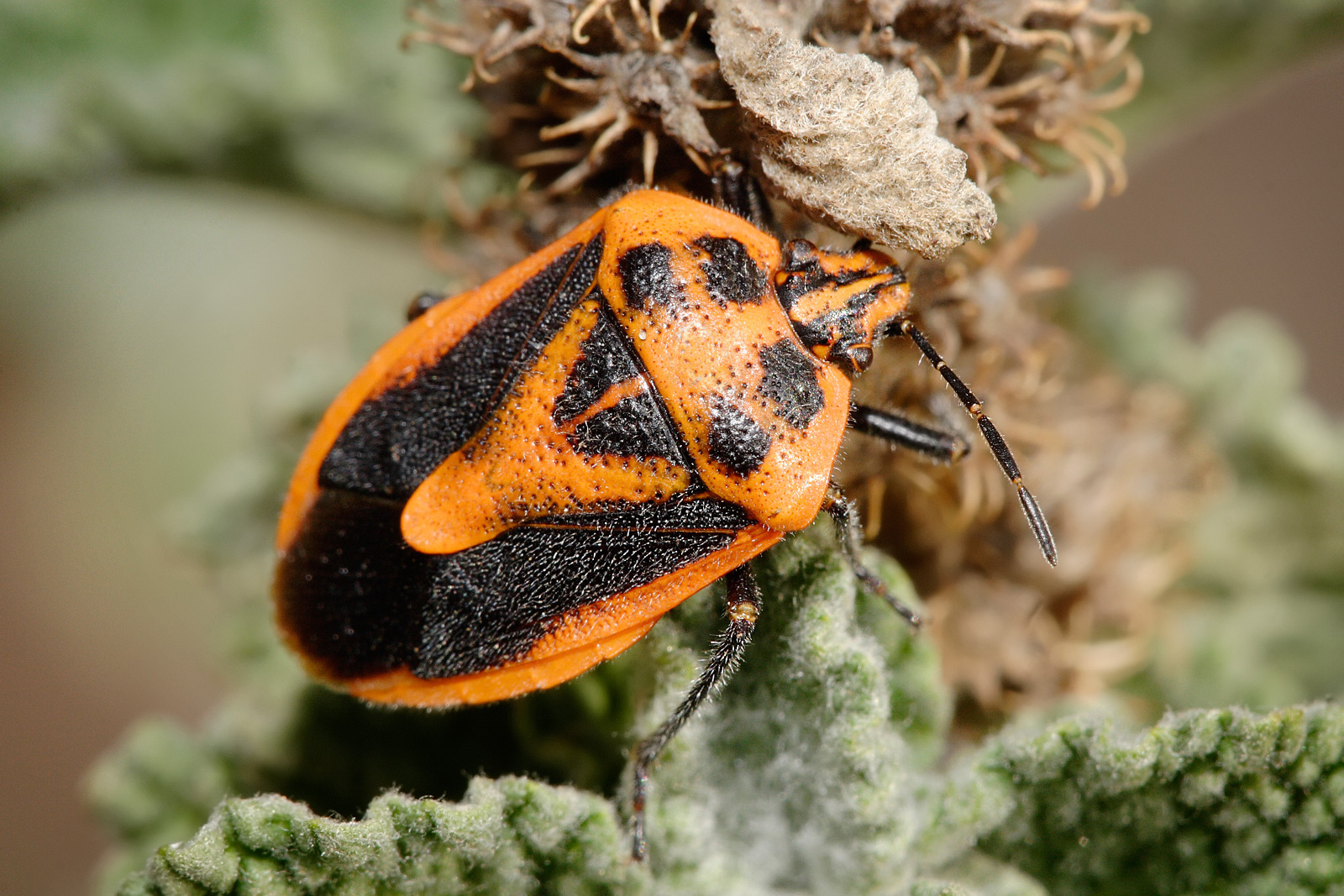
- Horehound bug on horehound plant

Scientific classification
- Domain: Eukaryota
- Kingdom: Animalia
- Phylum: Arthropoda
- Class: Insecta
- Order: Hemiptera
- Suborder: Heteroptera
- Family: Pentatomidae
- Genus: Agonoscelis
- Species: A. rutila

Binomial name
- Agonoscelis rutila Fabricius, 1776

= Horehound bug =

Species of true bug

The horehound bug (Agonoscelis rutila) is a stink bug which sucks the sap of the horehound plant, causing wilting of new shoots. They have five nymphal stages in their development. Although they usually attack horehound, they may also swarm on a variety of other trees and shrubs.

== Additional photos ==
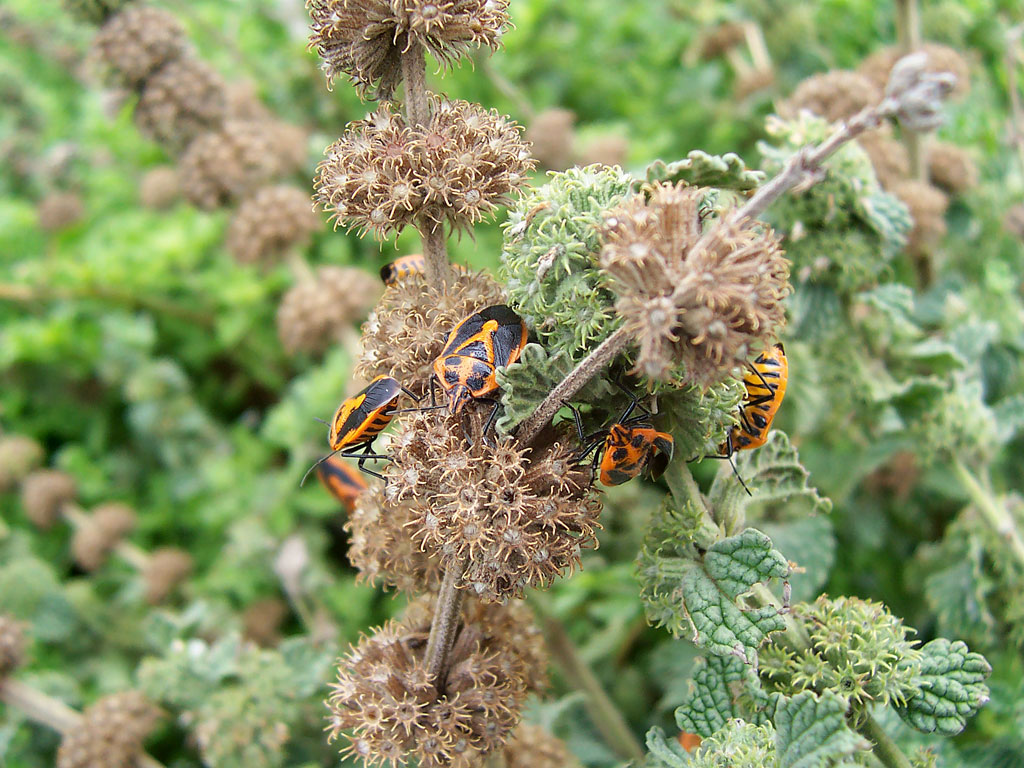
Horehound bugs

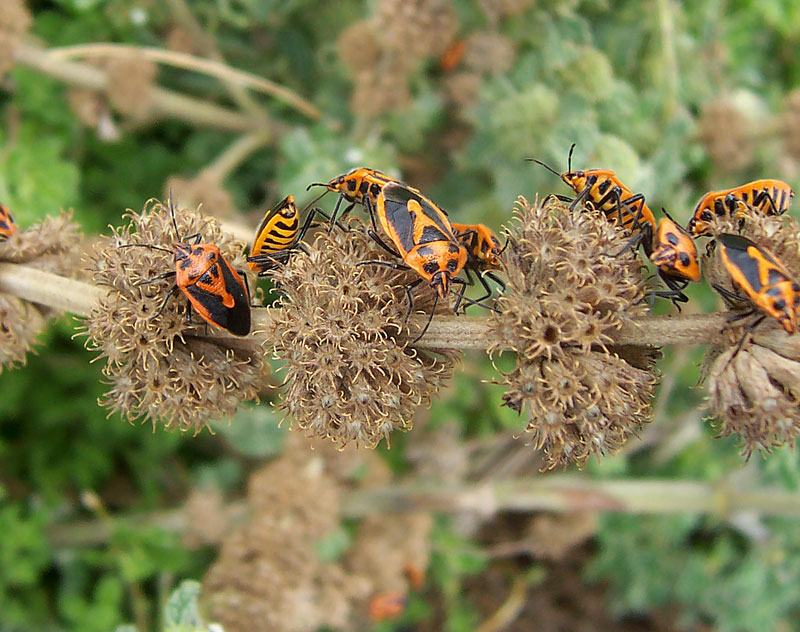
Horehound bugs
