= Wheeleria lyrae =

Scientific classification
- Kingdom: Animalia
- Phylum: Arthropoda
- Class: Insecta
- Order: Lepidoptera
- Family: Pterophoridae
- Genus: Wheeleria
- Species: W. lyrae

Binomial name
- Wheeleria lyrae (Arenberger, 1983)

Synonyms
- Pterophorus lyrae Arenberger, 1983; Merrifieldia lyrae

Species of plume moth

Wheeleria lyrae is a moth of the family Pterophoridae that is endemic to Greece.
