= Museum of Root Beer =

Museum in Wisconsin Dells, Wisconsin

Coordinates: 43°37′40″N 89°46′12″W

The Museum of Root Beer is a museum in Wisconsin Dells, Wisconsin that is dedicated to history and memorabilia related to root beer. The museum features root beer taste tests, sorted by taste and brand, as well as supporting independent root beer breweries. It also features root beer merchandise.

== History ==
The Museum of Root Beer opened on May 28, 2021. It is housed at a soda shop called Root Beer Revelry. It was funded with a two-week Kickstarter campaign launched in February of that year.

Owned by Iowa resident Vince Payne, the museum's collection includes memorabilia from over 2,000 root beer brands, and includes signage, packaging materials, tap handles, and bottles. It includes the collection of the now-defunct Root Beer Revelry Museum, which operated from 2011 to 2013 but closed over financial issues.

According to Payne, the collection was built over the course of many years, starting when he was 11 years old, and was housed previously in the basement of his house.
