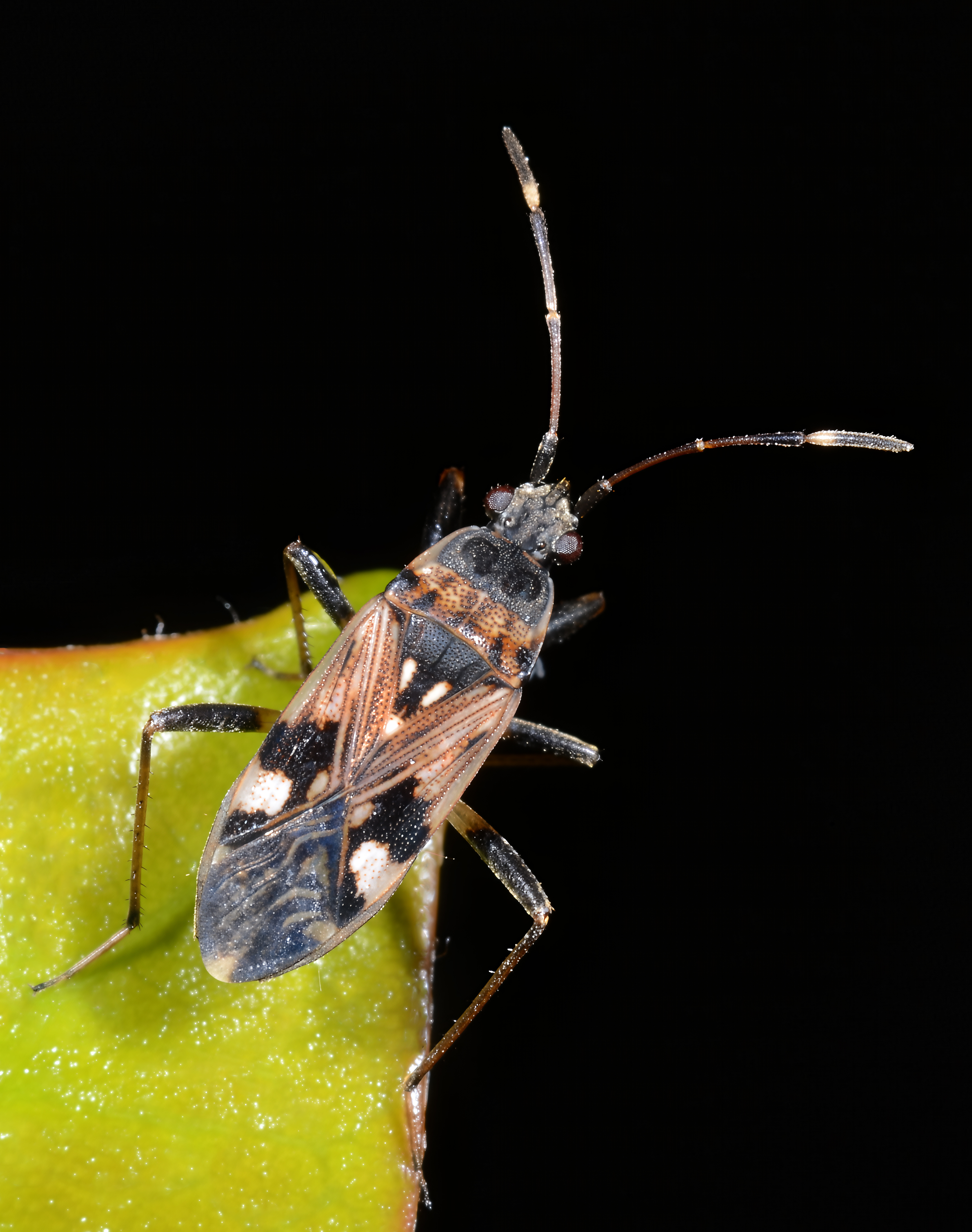

Scientific classification
- Kingdom: Animalia
- Phylum: Arthropoda
- Clade: Pancrustacea
- Class: Insecta
- Order: Hemiptera
- Suborder: Heteroptera
- Family: Rhyparochromidae
- Subfamily: Rhyparochrominae
- Tribe: Rhyparochromini
- Genus: Beosus
- Species: B. maritimus

Binomial name
- Beosus maritimus (Scopoli, 1763)

= Beosus maritimus =

Species of dirt-colored seed bug

Beosus maritimus is a species of dirt-colored seed bug in the family Rhyparochromidae, found mainly in Europe and western Asia.

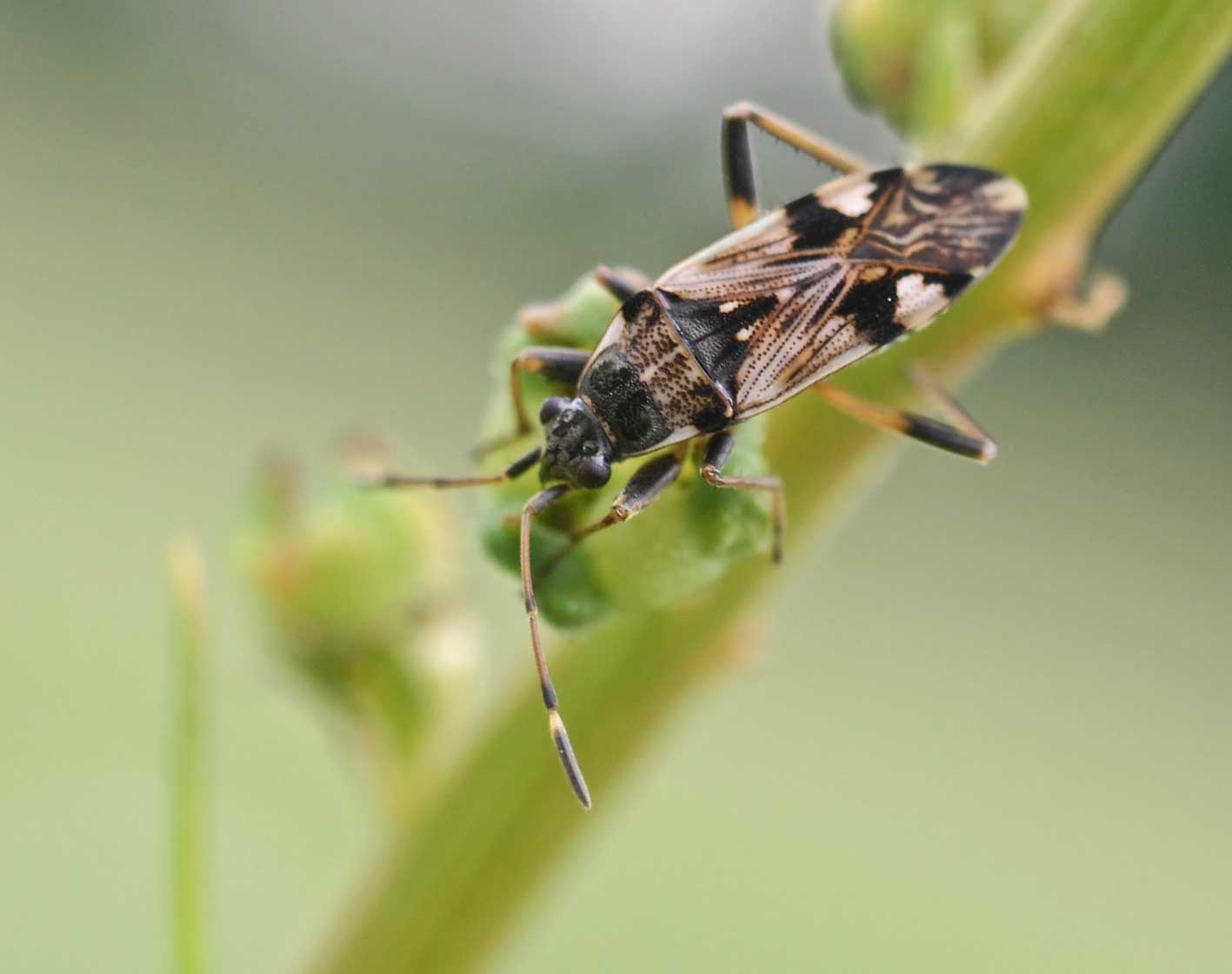
Beosus maritimus

== Subspecies ==
These four subspecies belong to the species Beosus maritimus:

- Beosus maritimus buyssoni Montandon, 1889
- Beosus maritimus maritimus Scopoli, 1763
- Beosus maritimus ochraceus Wagner, 1949
- Beosus maritimus sphragadimium (Fieber, 1861)
