= Horehound beer =

Soft drink

Horehound beer or horehound ale is a soft drink (alcohol-free) carbonated beverage, flavoured primarily with herbs (principally horehound), double hops and cane sugar. It is drunk in the southern United States, Australia and England.

== See also ==
- Beer
- Birch beer
- Bitter melon tea, prepared from Momordica charantia
- Malt beverage
- Root beer
- Sassafras
