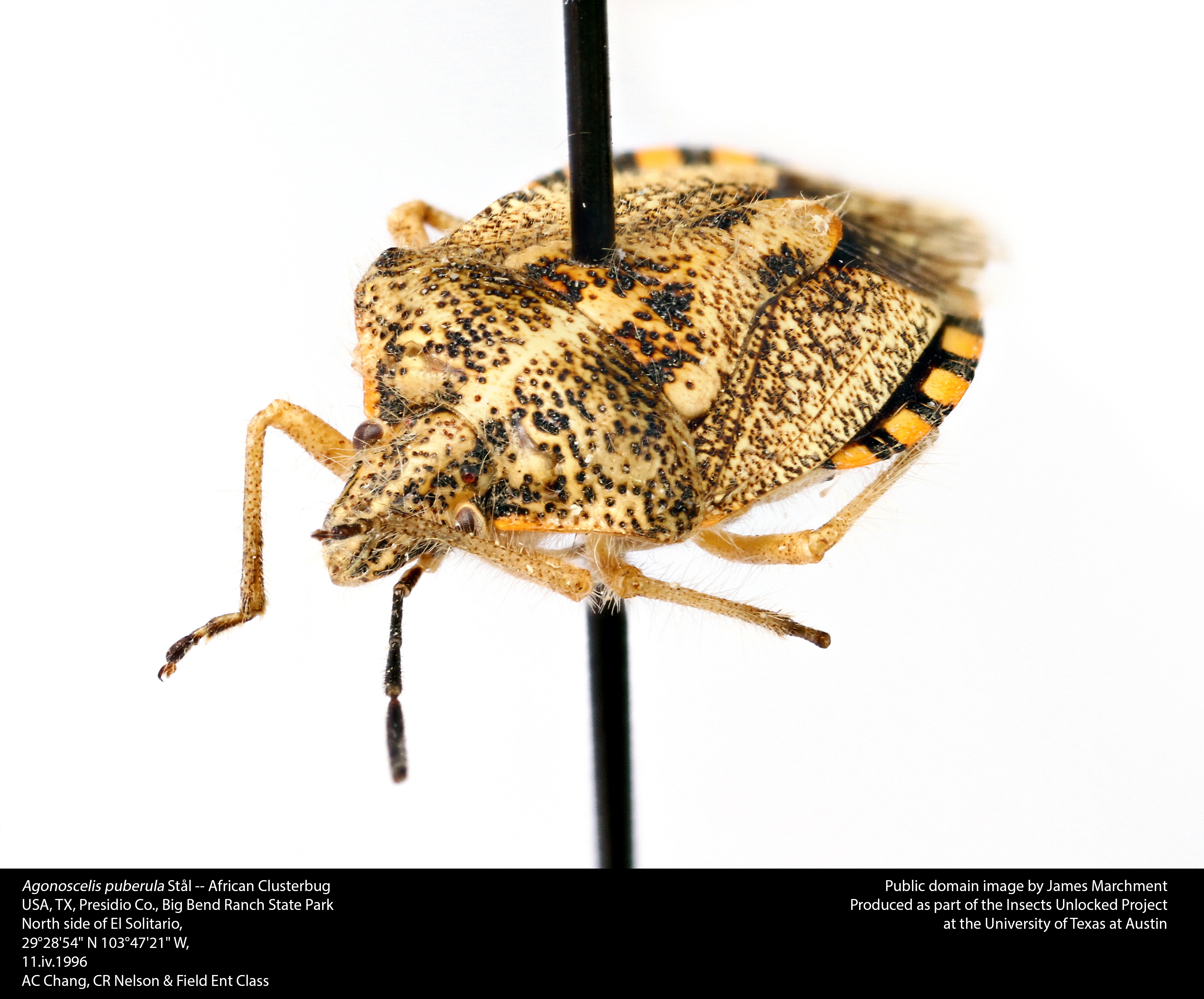

Scientific classification
- Kingdom: Animalia
- Phylum: Arthropoda
- Clade: Pancrustacea
- Class: Insecta
- Order: Hemiptera
- Suborder: Heteroptera
- Family: Pentatomidae
- Tribe: Agonoscelidini
- Genus: Agonoscelis
- Species: A. puberula

Binomial name
- Agonoscelis puberula Stål, 1853

= Agonoscelis puberula =

Species of true bug

Agonoscelis puberula, the African cluster bug, is a species of stink bug in the family Pentatomidae. It is native to Africa, but can now found in the Caribbean, Central America, and North America. The earliest record of this species in the Western Hemisphere was from 1985.
