= Wheeleria phlomidis =

Scientific classification
- Kingdom: Animalia
- Phylum: Arthropoda
- Class: Insecta
- Order: Lepidoptera
- Family: Pterophoridae
- Genus: Wheeleria
- Species: W. phlomidis

Binomial name
- Wheeleria phlomidis (Staudinger, 1870)

Synonyms
- Aciptilus phlomidis Staudinger, 1870; Pterophorus phlomidis; Merrifieldia phlomidis

Species of plume moth

Wheeleria phlomidis is a moth of the family Pterophoridae. It is found in southern and central Russia, Asia Minor, Iran, Syria, Jordan, the Palestinian Territories and Greece.

The larvae feed on Phlomis species (including Phlomis orientalis).
