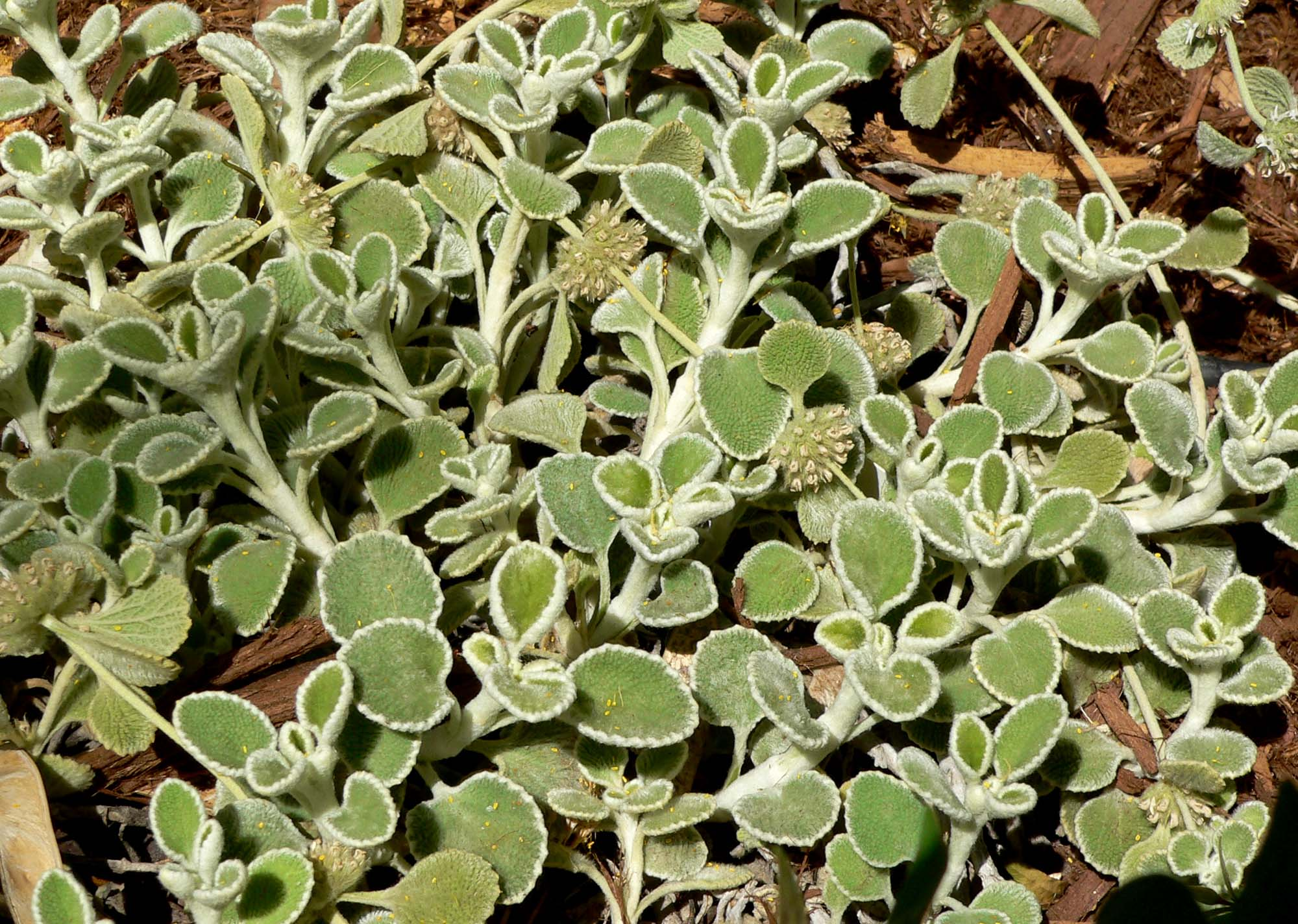
- Foliage of Marrubium rotundifolia

Scientific classification
- Kingdom: Plantae
- Clade: Tracheophytes
- Clade: Angiosperms
- Clade: Eudicots
- Clade: Asterids
- Order: Lamiales
- Family: Lamiaceae
- Subfamily: Lamioideae
- Genus: Marrubium; L.

Synonyms
- Padota Adans.; Atirbesia Raf.; Maropsis Pomel

= Marrubium =

Horehound

Genus of flowering plants

Marrubium (horehound or hoarhound) is a genus of flowering plants in the family Lamiaceae, native to temperate regions of Europe, North Africa, and Asia as far east as the Xinjiang region of western China. A few species are also naturalized in North and South America.

Species

- Marrubium alyssoides Pomel – Algeria, Morocco
- Marrubium alysson L. – Mediterranean from Spain + Morocco to Palestine
- Marrubium anisodon K.Koch – Greece, Albania, Crimea, southwest Asia from Turkey to Kashmir
- Marrubium aschersonii Magnus – Tunisia
- Marrubium astracanicum Jacq. – Caucasus, Iran, Iraq, Turkey
- Marrubium atlanticum Batt. – Morocco
- Marrubium ayardii Maire – Morocco
- Marrubium × bastetanum Coincy – Spain (M. supinum × M. vulgare)
- Marrubium bourgaei Boiss. – Turkey
- Marrubium catariifolium Desr. – Caucasus, Turkey
- Marrubium cephalanthum Boiss. & Noë – Turkey
- Marrubium cordatum Nábelek – Iran, Iraq, Turkey
- Marrubium crassidens Boiss. – Iran, Iraq
- Marrubium cuneatum Banks & Sol. – Iran, Iraq, Turkey, Syria, Lebanon, Palestine
- Marrubium cylleneum Boiss. & Heldr. – Greece
- Marrubium depauperatum Boiss. & Balansa – Turkey
- Marrubium duabense Murata – Iran, Afghanistan
- Marrubium echinatum Ball – Morocco
- Marrubium eriocephalum Seybold – Iraq
- Marrubium fontianum Maire – Rif in northern Morocco
- Marrubium friwaldskyanum Boiss. – Bulgaria
- Marrubium glechomifolium Freyn & Conrath – Caucasus
- Marrubium globosum Montbret & Aucher ex Benth. – Turkey, Syria, Lebanon
- Marrubium heterocladum Emb. & Maire – Rif in northern Morocco
- Marrubium heterodon (Benth.) Boiss. & Balansa – Turkey
- Marrubium hierapolitanum Mouterde – Syria
- Marrubium × humbertii Emb. & Maire – Morocco (M. ayardii × M. multibracteatum)
- Marrubium incanum Desr. – Italy (including Sicily + Sardinia), Greece, Albania, Yugoslavia, Bulgaria
- Marrubium leonuroides Desr. – Caucasus, Crimea
- Marrubium litardierei Marmey – Morocco
- Marrubium lutescens Boiss. & Heldr. – Turkey
- Marrubium multibracteatum Humbert & Maire – Morocco
- Marrubium × paniculatum Desr. – Austria, Czech Republic, Yugoslavia (M. peregrinum × M. vulgare)
- Marrubium parviflorum Fisch. & C.A.Mey. – Turkey, Iran, Caucasus
- Marrubium peregrinum L. – central + Eastern Europe, Turkey, Caucasus
- Marrubium persicum C.A.Mey – Turkey, Iran, Caucasus
- Marrubium pestalozzae Boiss. – Greece, Bulgaria, Romania, Moldova, Ukraine, Crimea
- Marrubium plumosum C.A.Mey. – Caucasus
- Marrubium procerum Bunge – Iran
- Marrubium propinquum Fisch. & C.A.Mey. – Iran, Caucasus
- Marrubium rotundifolia Boiss. – Turkey
- Marrubium sivasense Aytaç, Akgül & Ekici – Turkey
- Marrubium supinum L. – Spain, Morocco, Algeria, Tunisia
- Marrubium thessalum Boiss. & Heldr. – Albania, Greece
- Marrubium trachyticum Boiss. – Turkey
- Marrubium vanense Hub.-Mor. – Turkey
- Marrubium velutinum Sm. – Greece
- Marrubium vulcanicum Hub.-Mor. – Turkey
- Marrubium vulgare L. – White horehound or common horehound – widespread from Denmark + Azores + Canary Islands east to Xingiang; naturalized in New Zealand, New Caledonia, Hawaii, Easter Island, North + South America

The genus name Marrubium derives from the Latin word marrubii, meaning horehound. The French Talmudic exegete, Rashi, thinks that this herb may have been used as one of the bitter herbs on the night of Passover. The common English name horehound is of unknown origin, but with the first part 'hore' derived from "hoary", "hairy".

The species formerly classified as Marrubium nigrum (Black Horehound) is now placed in the genus Ballota.

Marrubium species are used as food plants by the larvae of some Lepidoptera species including Coleophora lineolea.
