= Agonoscelis pubescens =

Scientific classification
- Kingdom: Animalia
- Phylum: Arthropoda
- Class: Insecta
- Order: Hemiptera
- Suborder: Heteroptera
- Family: Pentatomidae
- Tribe: Agonoscelidini
- Genus: Agonoscelis
- Species: A. pubescens

Binomial name
- Agonoscelis pubescens (Thunberg)

Species of true bug

Agonoscelis pubescens, the African cluster bug or sorghum bug, is a species of stink bug in the family Pentatomidae. In Africa, it is a pest of crops such as sorghum and sesame.

== Synonyms ==
- Agonoscelis versicolor Fabricius, 1794
