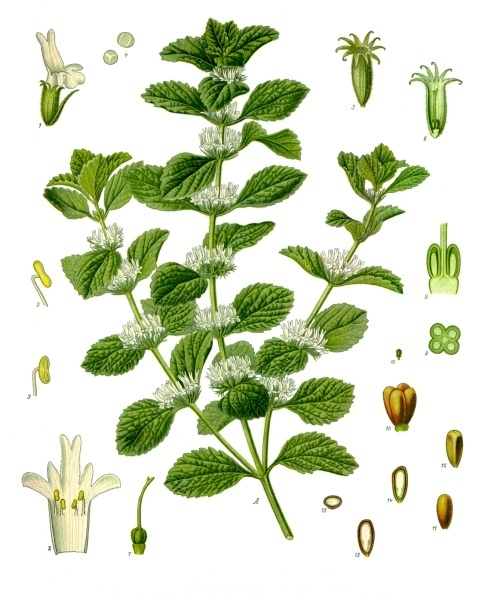
- Marrubium vulgare

Conservation status
- Near Threatened (IUCN 3.1)

Scientific classification
- Kingdom: Plantae
- Clade: Tracheophytes
- Clade: Angiosperms
- Clade: Eudicots
- Clade: Asterids
- Order: Lamiales
- Family: Lamiaceae
- Genus: Marrubium
- Species: M. vulgare

Binomial name
- Marrubium vulgare L.

Synonyms
- List: Marrubium album Garsault; Marrubium apulum Ten.; Marrubium ballotoides Boiss. & Balansa; Marrubium germanicum Schrank ex Steud.; Marrubium hamatum Kunth; Marrubium hyperleucum Candargy; Marrubium uncinatum Stokes; Marrubium vaillantii Coss. & Germ.; Prasium marrubium E.H.L.Krause

= Marrubium vulgare =

Plant species in the mint family

Marrubium vulgare (white horehound or common horehound) is a flowering plant in the mint family (Lamiaceae), native to Europe, northern Africa, and southwestern and central Asia. Specifically, it emerged in the region between the Mediterranean Sea and Central Asia and now inhabits all continents save Antarctica. It is also widely naturalized in many places, including most of North and South America.

It is a grey-leaved herbaceous perennial plant, and grows to 25–45 centimetres (10–18 in) tall. The leaves are 2–5 cm (0.8–2.0 in) long with a densely crinkled surface, and are covered in downy hairs. The flowers are white, borne in clusters on the upper part of the main stem.

== Etymology ==
The Oxford English Dictionary derives the word horehound from Old English hoar (furry, as in "hoarfrost") and hune (a word of unknown origin designating a class of herbs or plants). The second element was altered by folk etymology. The word "white" is generally used in botanical contexts, to distinguish it from black horehound (Ballota nigra), a similar-looking herb.

== Uses ==
=== Folk medicine ===
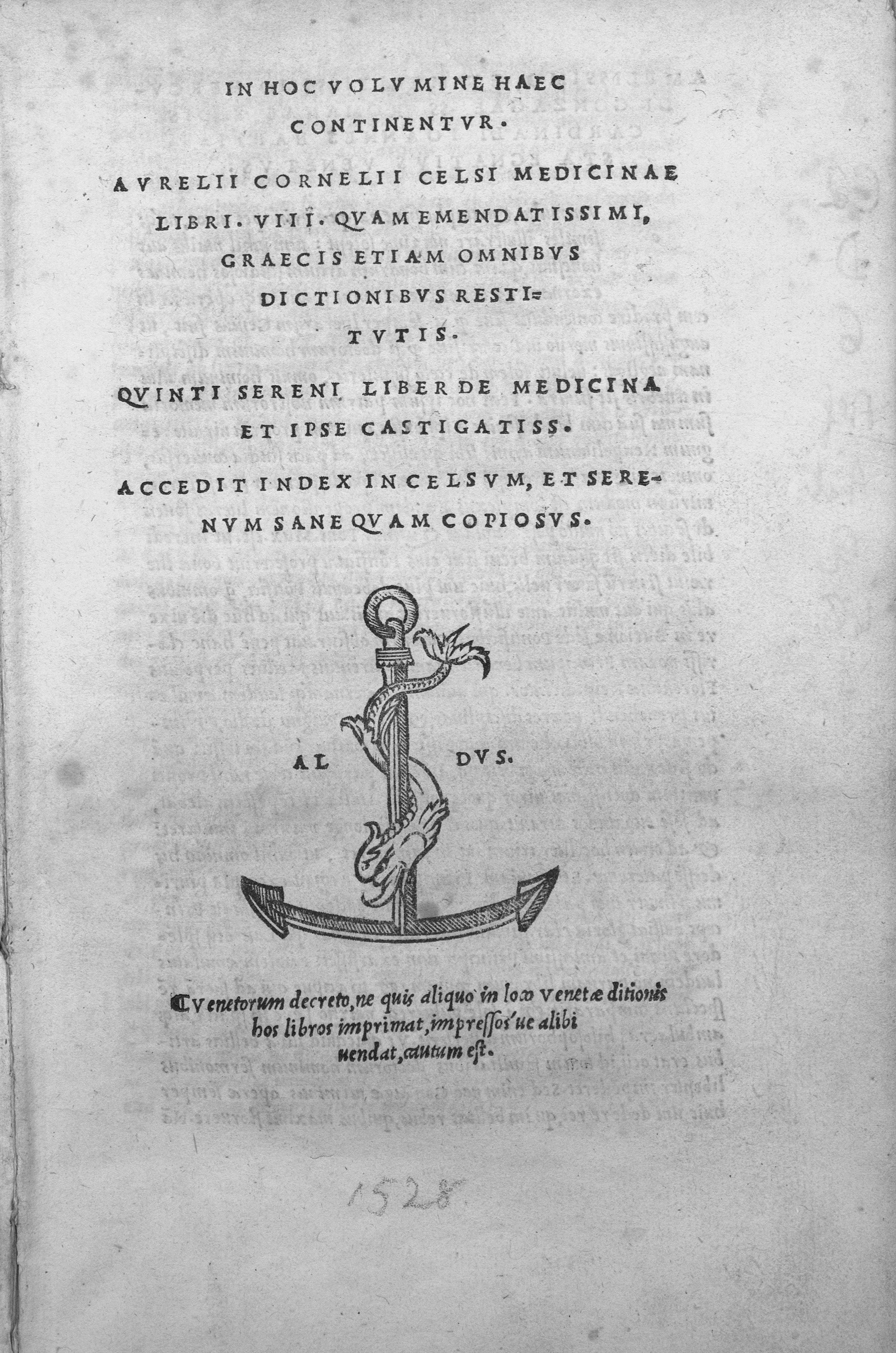
Celsus' De medicina in the Aldine edition of 1528

White horehound has been mentioned in conjunction with use as a folk medicine dating at least back to the 1st century BC, where it appeared as a remedy for respiratory ailments in the treatise De Medicina by Roman encyclopaedist Aulus Cornelius Celsus. The Roman agricultural writer Columella lists it as a remedy for expelling worms in farm animals in his important first-century work On Agriculture. Since then, white horehound has appeared for similar purposes in numerous herbals over the centuries, such as The Herball, or, Generall historie of plantes by John Gerard, and Every Man His Own Doctor: or, The Poor Planter's Physician.

M. vulgare has been described in monographs of the German Commission E as a treatment for colds, as a digestive, and as a choleretic. It is one of the ingredients of the Ricola throat lozenge. The U.S. Food and Drug Administration does not endorse the plant for use as a drug, but includes it as a safe food additive.

=== Culinary ===
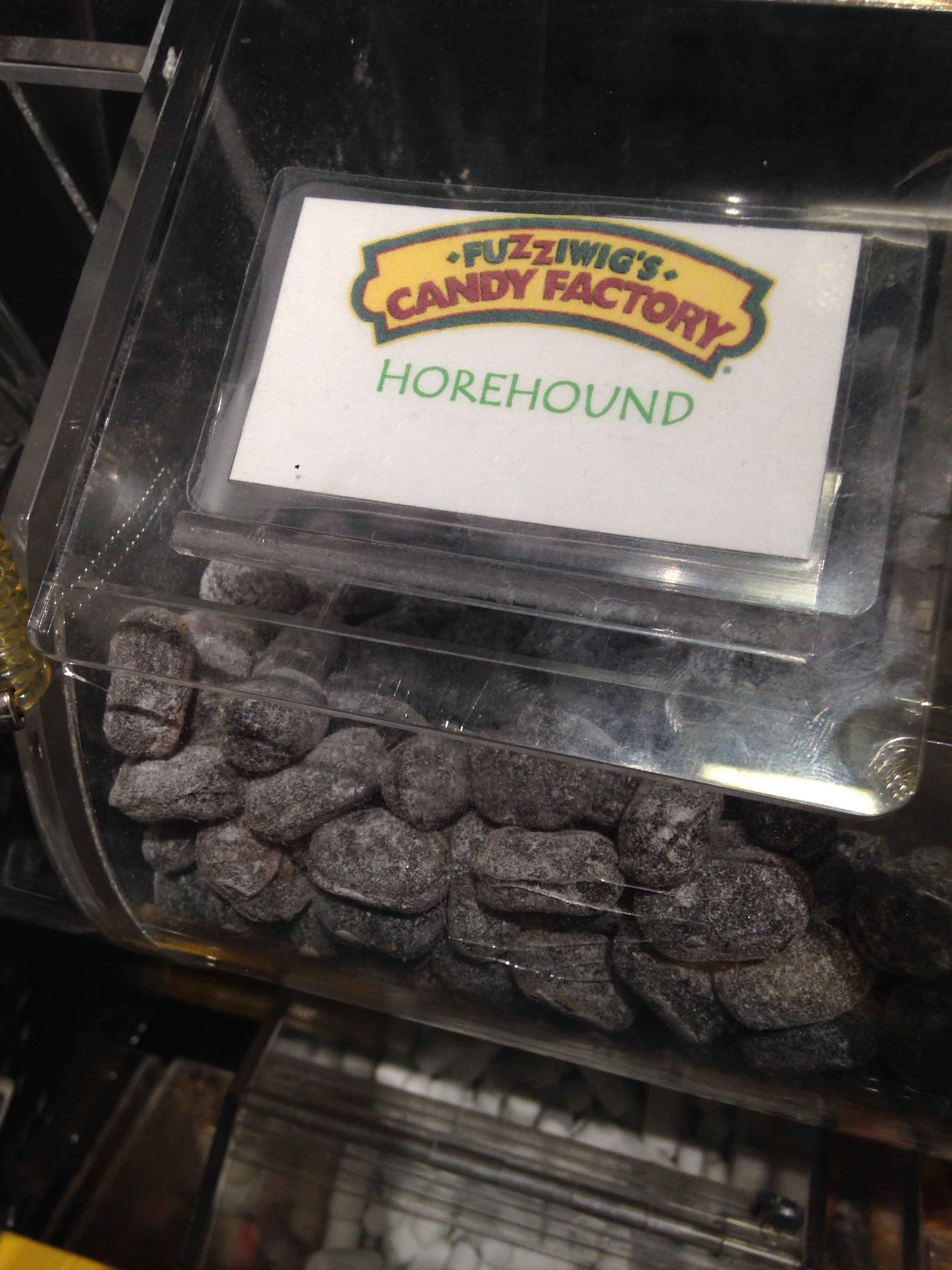
A container of horehound candies from Fuzziwig's Candy Factory

Horehound candy drops are bittersweet hard candies like cough drops made with sugar and an extract of M. vulgare. They are dark-colored, dissolve in the mouth, and have a flavor that has been compared to menthol and root beer. Like other products derived from M. vulgare, they are sometimes used as an unproven folk treatment for coughs and other ailments.

M. vulgare is used to make beverages such as horehound beer (similar to root beer), horehound herbal tea (similar to the Maghrebi mint tea), and the rock and rye cocktail.

== As an invasive weed ==
Horehound was introduced to southern Australia in the 19th century as a medicinal herb. It became a weed of native grasslands and pastures where it was introduced with settlers' livestock and was first declared under noxious weeds legislation. It now appears to have reached its full potential distribution.

In New Zealand, efforts are being made to control its spread with biocontrol measures using the horehound clearwing moth (Chamaesphecia mysiniformis) and the horehound plume moth (Wheeleria spilodactylus), which can eat their way through many plants.

Horehound is usually found in disturbed and overgrazed areas. It is highly unpalatable to livestock, so livestock eat other plants around it, a process that favors the persistence and spread of the weed. It may persist in native vegetation that has been grazed.

== As biocontrol ==
Marrubium vulgare is also used as a natural grasshopper repellent in agriculture.

== In astrology ==
According to 14th century English poet John Gower, in Book 7 of his Confessio Amantis, this plant was the herb of the fourth star of Nectanebus' astrology, Capella. Gower uses the older name, Alhaiot (VII:1338).

== Gallery ==
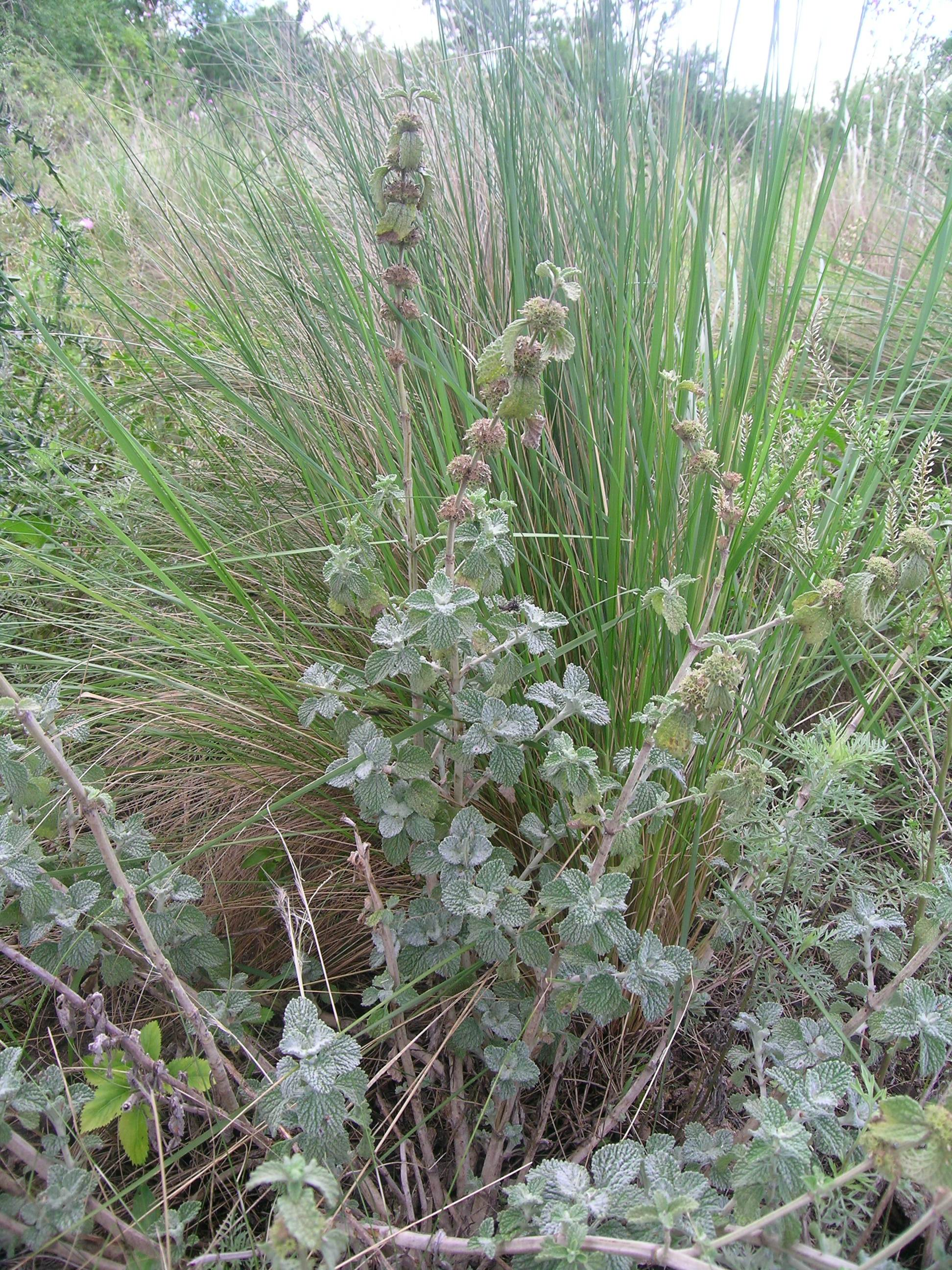
Wild horehound

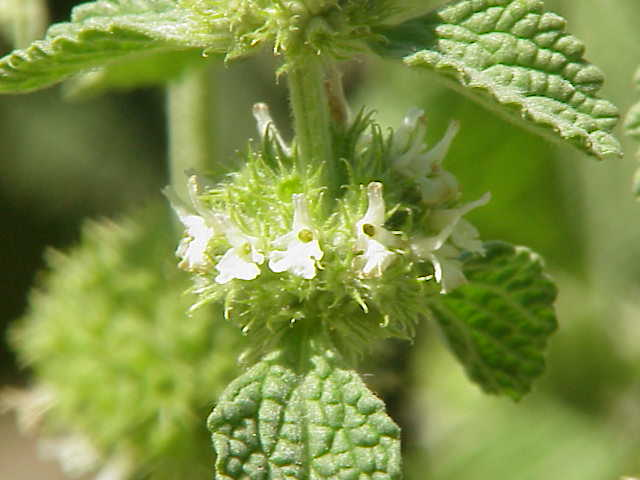
Flowers

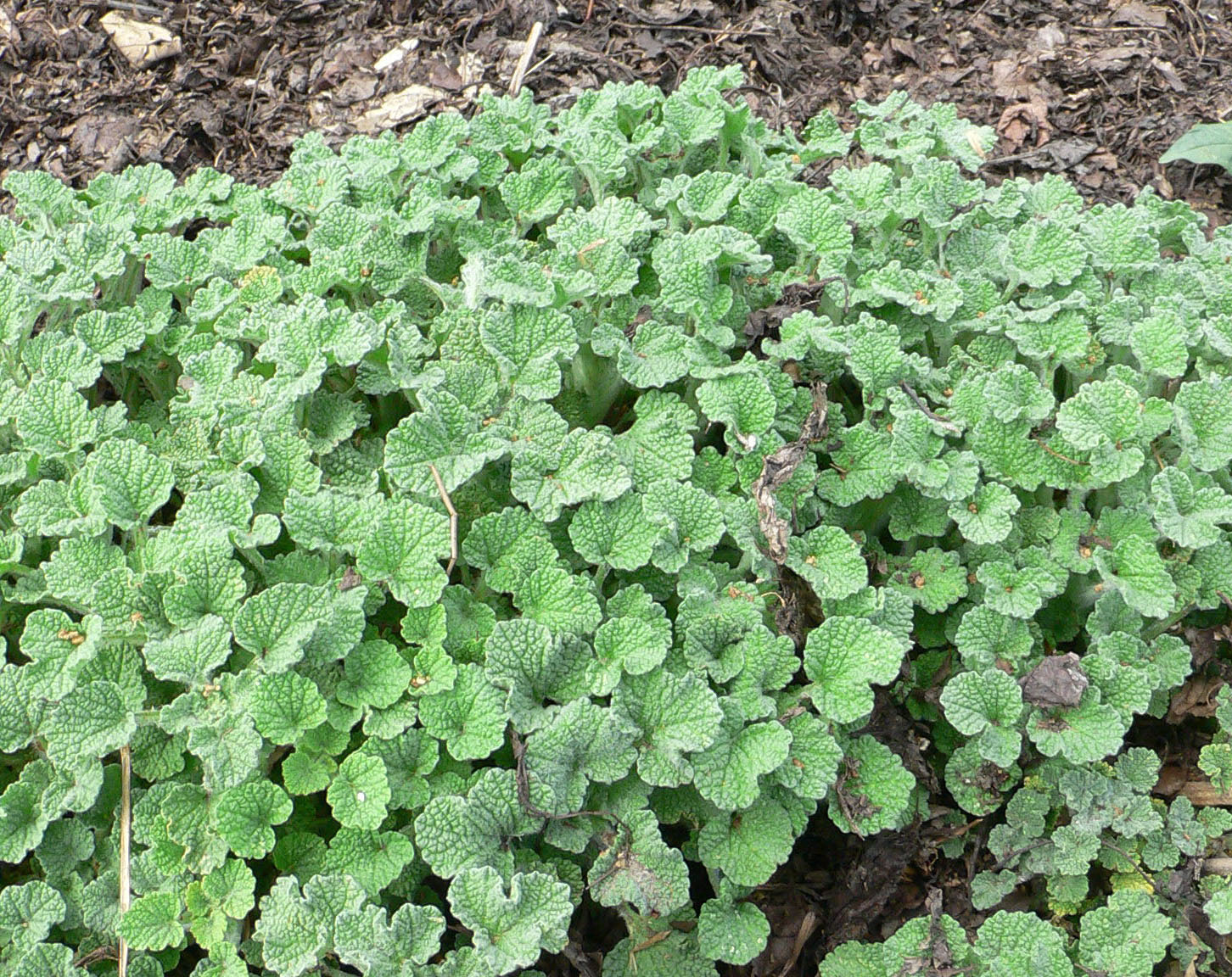
Foliage of young plants

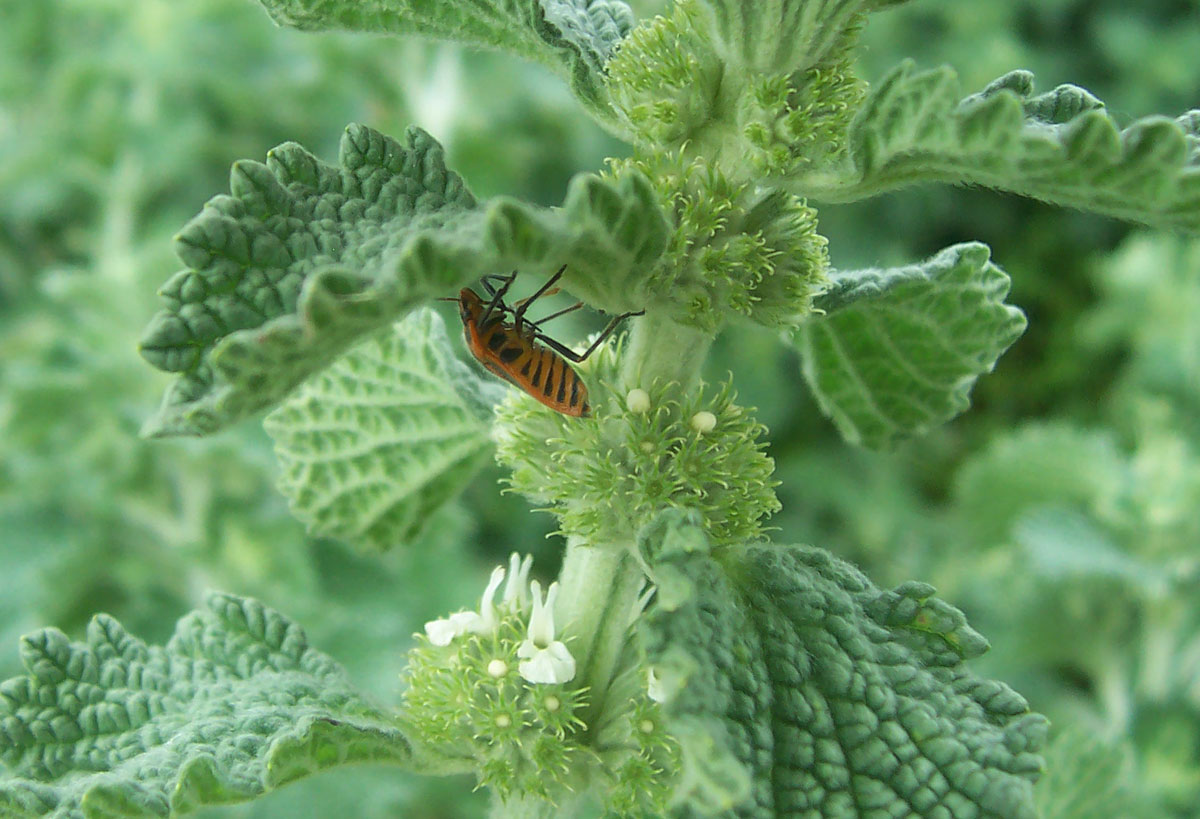
Horehound bug (Agonoscelis rutila), an insect that feeds on the plant

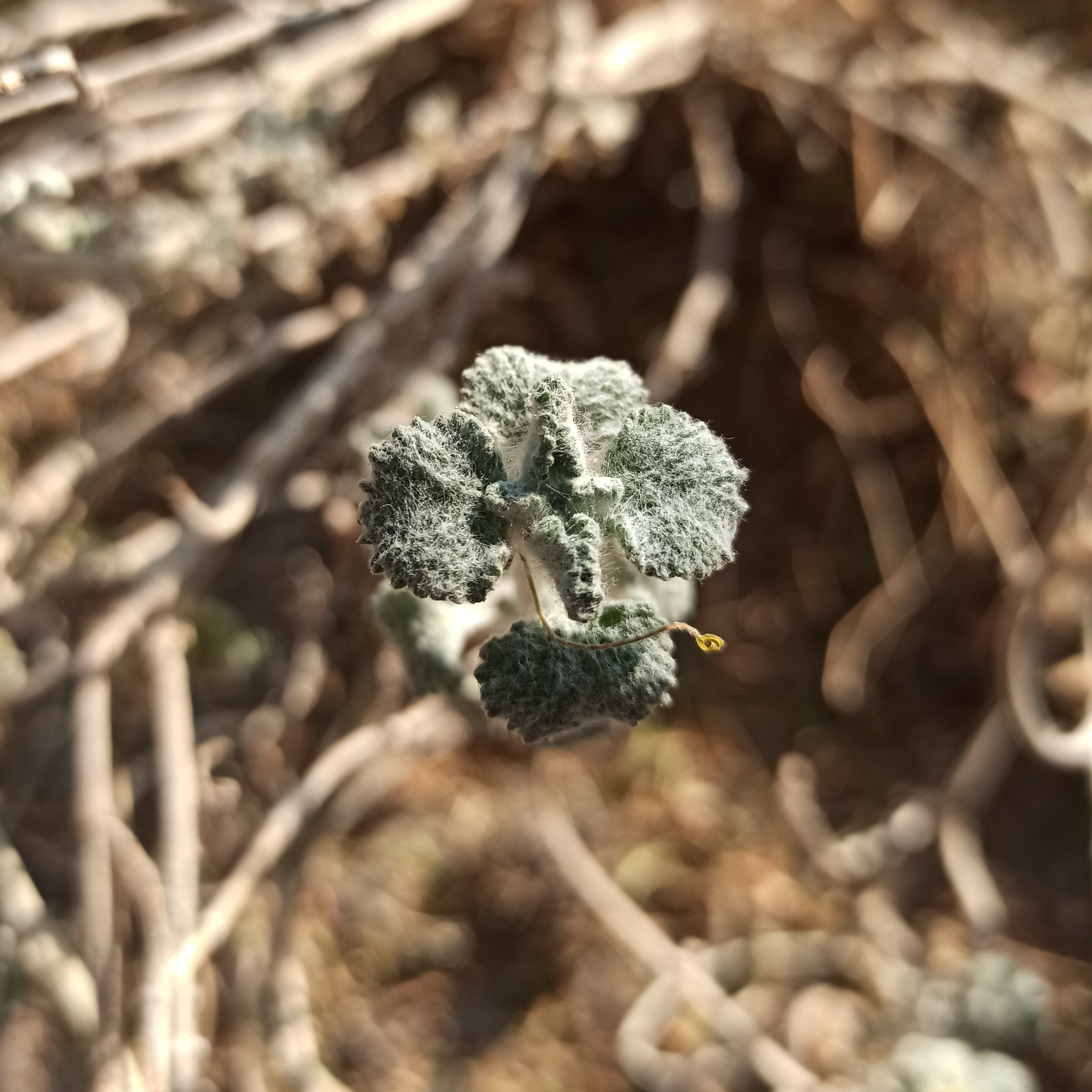
Leaves (detail)

== See also ==
- Black Horehound
- List of candies
