= Fuzziwig's Candy Factory =

American candy shop chain

- Type: Private
- Industry: Confectionery
- Genre: Retail
- Founded: 1995
- Headquarters: Durango, CO
- Key people: Kayo Folsom, Don Grueser
- Products: candy, chocolate, confections, toy novelties & accessories
- Website: https://fuzziwigscandyfactory.com/

Fuzziwig's Candy Factory is a franchise chain of candy shops located in the United States. The franchise chain sells mainly bulk candies and toy novelties such as Hello Kitty.

== History ==
=== Late 1990s to Early 2000s ===
For over 20 years, Kayo Folsom worked for the Rocky Mountain Chocolate Factory. In 1995, the Rocky Mountain Chocolate Factory created a new division called Fuzziwigs Candy Factory. The name comes from the word, Fezziwig, the name of Scrooge's kind mentor in Charles Dickens' A Christmas Carol. Rocky Mountain Chocolate sold the Fuzziwigs division in 1998. In 2002, Kayo Folsom left his vice president position at Rocky Mountain Chocolate Factory and became the president of Fuzziwig's Candy Factory. The first Fuzziwig's Candy Factory opened in 1995. By the end of 2001, Fuzziwig's Candy Factory, Inc. grew to 20 stores.

In 2003, Fuzziwig's Candy Factory, Inc. acquired Sweets From Heaven USA, L.P., a Pittsburgh, PA chain of retail candy stores. "According to CEO Don Grueser, the acquisition made Fuzziwig’s Candy Factory the largest franchiser in the bulk "themed candy" segment."

=== Recent ===
As of June 2025, Fuzziwig's Candy Factory operates 30 stores in 17 states and Guam, including locations within Scheels stores.
