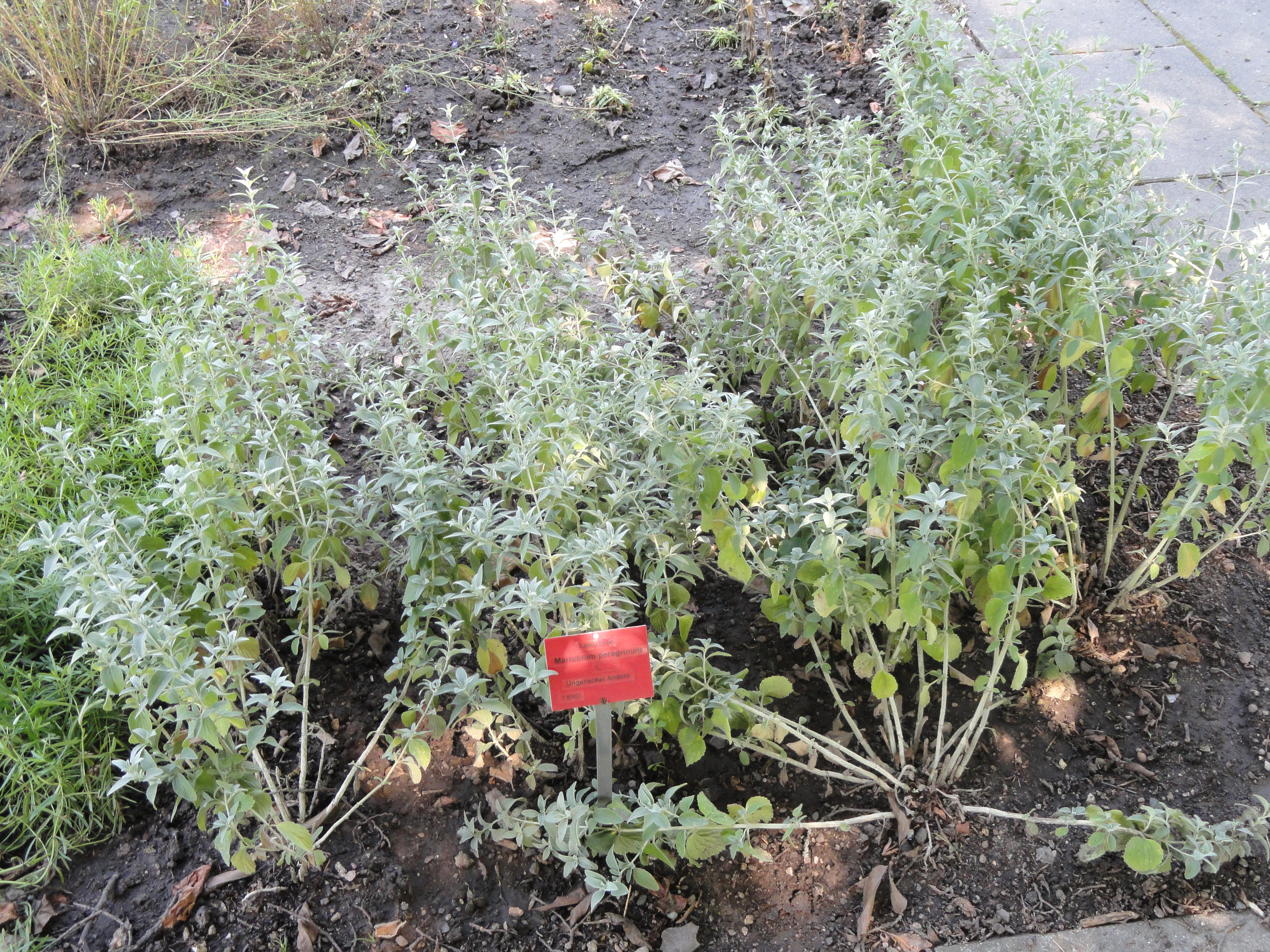

Scientific classification
- Kingdom: Plantae
- Clade: Tracheophytes
- Clade: Angiosperms
- Clade: Eudicots
- Clade: Asterids
- Order: Lamiales
- Family: Lamiaceae
- Genus: Marrubium
- Species: M. peregrinum

Binomial name
- Marrubium peregrinum L.

= Marrubium peregrinum =

Species of flowering plant

Marrubium peregrinum (horehound) is a species of herbaceous perennial plant, with height up to 60 cm, native to south-east Europe, the Balkans, and Asia Minor.

== Synonyms ==
- Atirbesia bracteata Raf.
- Marrubium affine Host
- Marrubium angustifolium Moench
- Marrubium candidissimum L.
- Marrubium candidissimum Orsini ex Ten.
- Marrubium civice Klokov
- Marrubium creticum Mill.
- Marrubium creticum Roth
- Marrubium flexuosum Moench
- Marrubium odoratissimum Pourr. ex Steud.
- Marrubium pannonicum Rchb.
- Marrubium pauciflorum Wallr.
- Marrubium peregrinum var. creticum (Mill.) Nyman
- Marrubium pestalozzae auct.
- Marrubium praecox Janka
- Marrubium remotum Janka
- Marrubium rubrum Roth
- Marrubium setaceum Desr.
- Marrubium uncinatum Hornem.
