= Root beer =

North American carbonated beverage

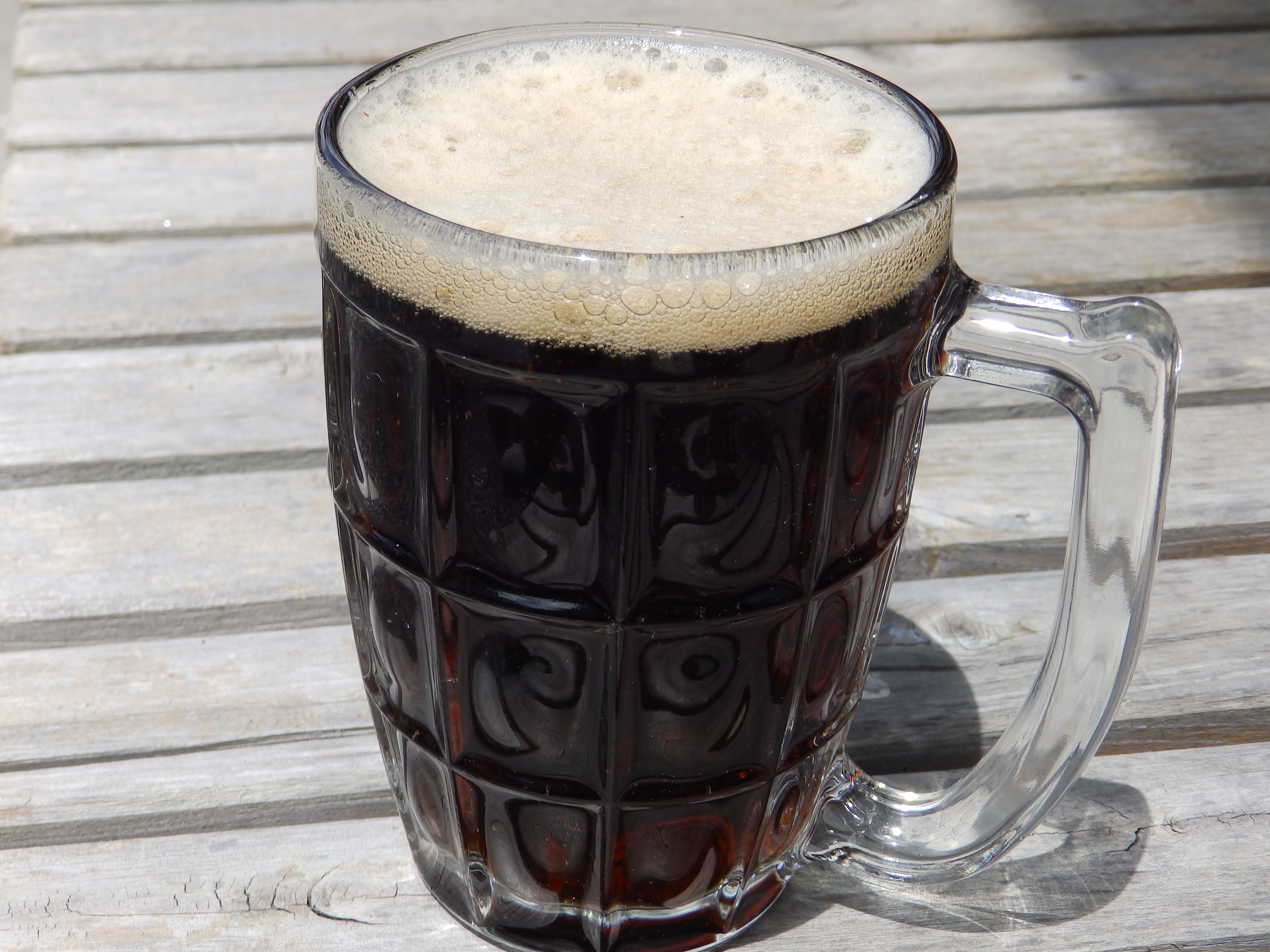
- Freshly poured root beer in a glass mug
- Type: Soft drink
- Origin: North America
- Introduced: c. 18th century
- Color: Caramel (dark)

Root beer is a North American beverage traditionally made using the root bark of the sassafras tree Sassafras albidum or the sarsaparilla vine Smilax ornata (also used to make a soft drink called sarsaparilla) as the primary flavor. It started out as a type of small beer that was brewed. Today, root beer is usually a sweet, carbonated soft drink that is generally non-alcoholic and caffeine-free. It usually has a thick and foamy head.

Since safrole, a key component of sassafras, was banned by the US Food and Drug Administration in 1960 due to its carcinogenicity, most commercial root beers have been flavored using artificial sassafras flavoring, but a few (e.g. Hansen's) used a safrole-free sassafras extract. There are many major root beer producers. A common use is to add vanilla ice cream to make a root beer float.

== History ==
Root beer has been drunk in the United States since at least the eighteenth century. It has been sold in confectionery stores since at least the 1840s, and written recipes for root beer have been documented since the 1830s. In the nineteenth century, it was often consumed hot and was often used with medicinal intent. It was combined with soda as early as the 1850s; at that time it was sold as a syrup rather than a ready-made beverage.

Beyond its aromatic qualities, the medicinal benefits of sassafras were well known to both Native Americans and Europeans, and druggists began marketing root beer for its medicinal qualities.

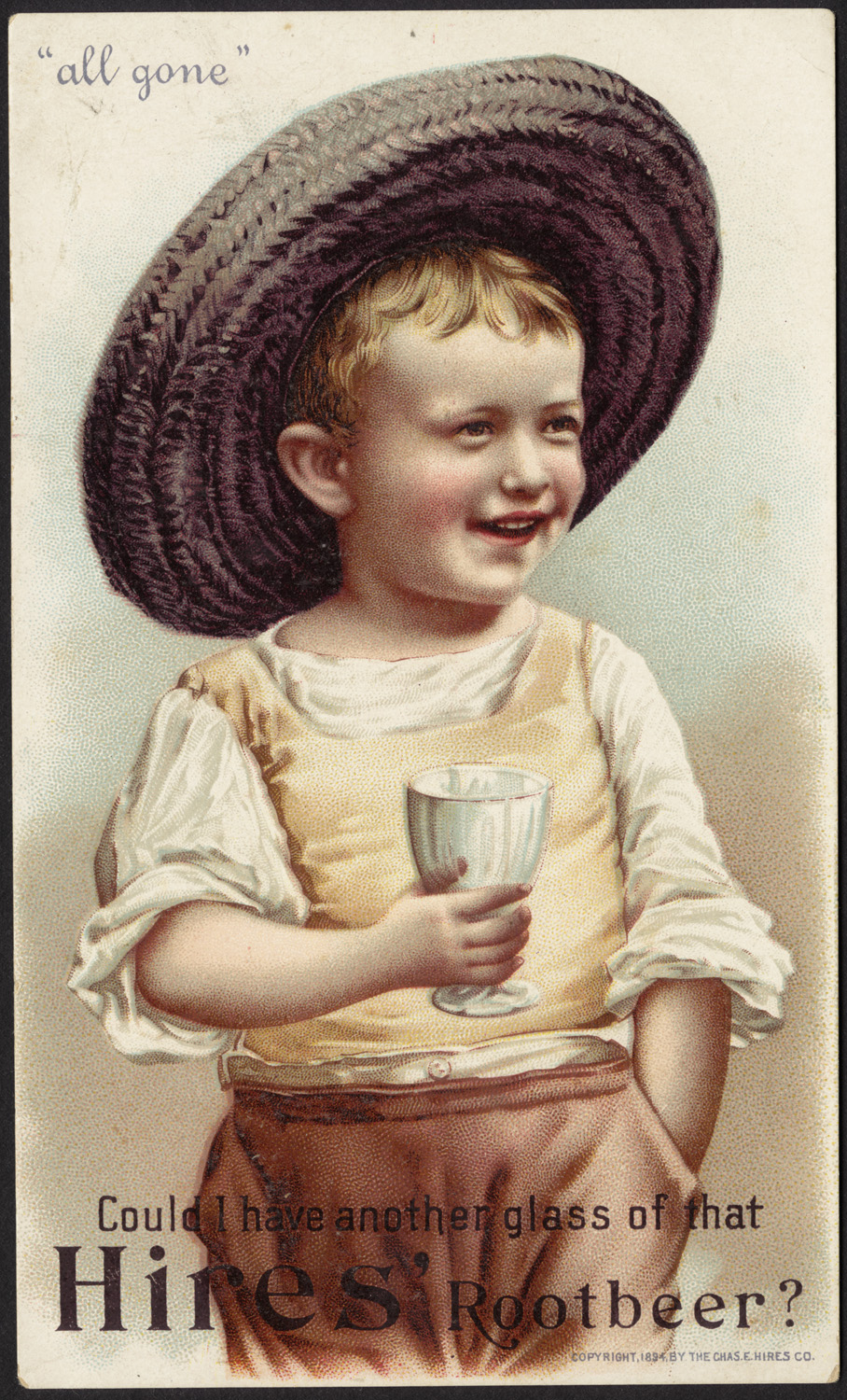
A Hires' root beer advertisement from 1894

Pharmacist Charles Elmer Hires was the first to successfully market a commercial brand of root beer. Hires developed his root tea made from sassafras in 1875, debuted a commercial version of root beer at the Philadelphia Centennial Exposition in 1876, and began selling his extract. Hires was a teetotaler who wanted to call the beverage "root tea". However, his desire to market the product to Pennsylvania coal miners caused him to call his product "root beer", instead.

In 1886, Hires began to bottle a beverage made from his famous extract. By 1893, root beer was distributed widely across the United States. Non-alcoholic versions of root beer became commercially successful, especially during Prohibition.

Not all traditional or commercial root beers were sassafras-based. One of Hires's early competitors was Barq's, which began selling its sarsaparilla-based root beer in 1898 and was labeled simply as "Barq's".

In 1919, Roy Allen opened his root-beer stand in Lodi, California, which led to the development of A&W Root Beer. One of Allen's innovations was that he served his homemade root beer in cold, frosty mugs. IBC Root Beer is another brand of commercially produced root beer that emerged during this period and is still well-known today.

Safrole, the aromatic oil found in sassafras roots and bark that gave traditional root beer its distinctive flavor, was banned in commercially mass-produced foods and drugs by the FDA in 1960. Laboratory animals that were given oral doses of sassafras tea or sassafras oil that contained large doses of safrole developed permanent liver damage or various types of cancer. While sassafras is no longer used in commercially produced root beer and is sometimes replaced with artificial flavors, natural extracts with the safrole distilled and removed are available.

A Museum of Root Beer opened in Wisconsin Dells in 2021.

== Traditional method ==
One traditional recipe for making root beer involves cooking a syrup from molasses and water, letting the syrup cool for three hours, and combining it with the root ingredients (including sassafras root, sassafras bark, and wintergreen). Yeast was added, and the beverage was left to ferment for 12 hours, after which it was strained and rebottled for secondary fermentation. This recipe usually resulted in a beverage of 2% alcohol or less, although the recipe could be modified to produce a more alcoholic beverage (such variation is called "hard root beer").

== Foam ==
Root beer was originally made with sassafras root and bark which, due to its mucilaginous properties, formed a natural, long lasting foam, a characteristic feature of the beverage. Root beer was originally carbonated by fermentation. As demand and technology changed, carbonated water was used. Some manufacturers used small amounts of starch (e.g. from cassava) with natural surfactants to reproduce the familiar foaming character of sassafras-based root beer. Some brands of root beer have distinctive foaming behaviors, which has been used as part of their marketing identity.

== Ingredients ==
Commercial root beer is now produced in Canada and every US state. Although this beverage's popularity is greatest in North America, some brands are produced in or imported by other countries, including Australia, the United Kingdom, Malaysia, Argentina, Germany, the Philippines, Singapore, Taiwan, South Korea, Indonesia, Sweden, Vietnam, and Thailand. While no standard recipe exists, the primary ingredients in modern root beer are filtered water, sugar, and safrole-free sassafras extract, which complements other flavors. Common flavorings are vanilla, caramel, wintergreen, black cherry bark, licorice root, sarsaparilla root, nutmeg, acacia, anise, molasses, cinnamon, sweet birch, and honey. Soybean protein or yucca are sometimes used to create a foamy quality, and caramel coloring is used to make the beverage brown.

Ingredients in early and traditional root beers include allspice, birch bark, coriander, juniper, ginger, wintergreen, hops, burdock root, dandelion root, spikenard, pipsissewa, guaiacum chips, sarsaparilla, spicewood, wild cherry bark, yellow dock, prickly ash bark, sassafras root, vanilla beans, dog grass, molasses and licorice. Many of these ingredients are still used in traditional and commercially produced root beer today, which is often thickened, foamed or carbonated.

Barq's contains about 1.8 mg of caffeine per fluid ounce. Most other major brands are caffeine-free.

Root beer can be made at home with processed extract obtained from a factory, or it can also be made from herbs and roots that have not yet been processed. Alcoholic and non-alcoholic traditional root beers make a thick and foamy head when poured, often enhanced by the addition of yucca extract, soybean protein, or other thickeners.

Alcoholic root beers produced in the 2000s have included Small Town Brewery's Not Your Father's Root Beer; Coney Island Brewing Co.'s hard root beer; and Best Damn Brewing Co.'s Best Damn Root Beer.

=== Common ingredients ===
==== Roots and herbs ====
- Sassafras albidum – sassafras roots and bark (or artificial safrole substitute)
- Smilax regelii – sarsaparilla
- Smilax glyciphylla – sweet sarsaparilla
- Piper auritum – root beer plant or hoja santa
- Glycyrrhiza glabra – licorice (root)
- Aralia nudicaulis – wild sarsaparilla or "rabbit root"
- Gaultheria procumbens – wintergreen (leaves and berries)
- Betula lenta – sweet birch (sap/syrup/resin)
- Betula nigra – black birch (sap/syrup/resin)
- Prunus serotina – black cherry (wood)
- Picea rubens – red spruce
- Picea mariana – black spruce
- Picea sitchensis – Sitka spruce
- Arctium lappa – burdock (root)
- Taraxacum officinale – dandelion (root)
- Quillaja saponaria – soapbark, a foaming agent
- Yucca – a foaming agent

==== Spices ====
- Pimenta dioica – allspice
- Theobroma cacao – chocolate
- Trigonella foenum-graecum – fenugreek
- Myroxylon balsamum – Tolu balsam
- Abies balsamea – balsam fir
- Myristica fragrans – nutmeg
- Cinnamomum verum – cinnamon (bark)
- Cinnamomum aromaticum – cassia (bark)
- Syzygium aromaticum – clove
- Foeniculum vulgare – fennel (seed)
- Zingiber officinale – ginger (stem/rhizome)
- Illicium verum – star anise
- Pimpinella anisum – anise
- Humulus lupulus – hops
- Mentha species – mint

==== Other ingredients ====
- carbonated water
- Hordeum vulgare – barley (malted)
- Hypericum perforatum – St. John's wort
- sugar
- molasses
- yeast

== See also ==
- Apple Beer
- Beer
- Beverage
- Birch beer
- Category:Root beer stands
- Cream soda
- Dandelion and burdock
- Ginger beer
- Horehound beer
- Julmust
- List of brand name soft drinks products
- List of soft drink flavors
- Malta (soft drink)
- Malzbier
- Moxie
- Root beer float
- Sarsaparilla (drink) – a similar, although distinct, beverage
- Spruce beer
- Tarkhuna
