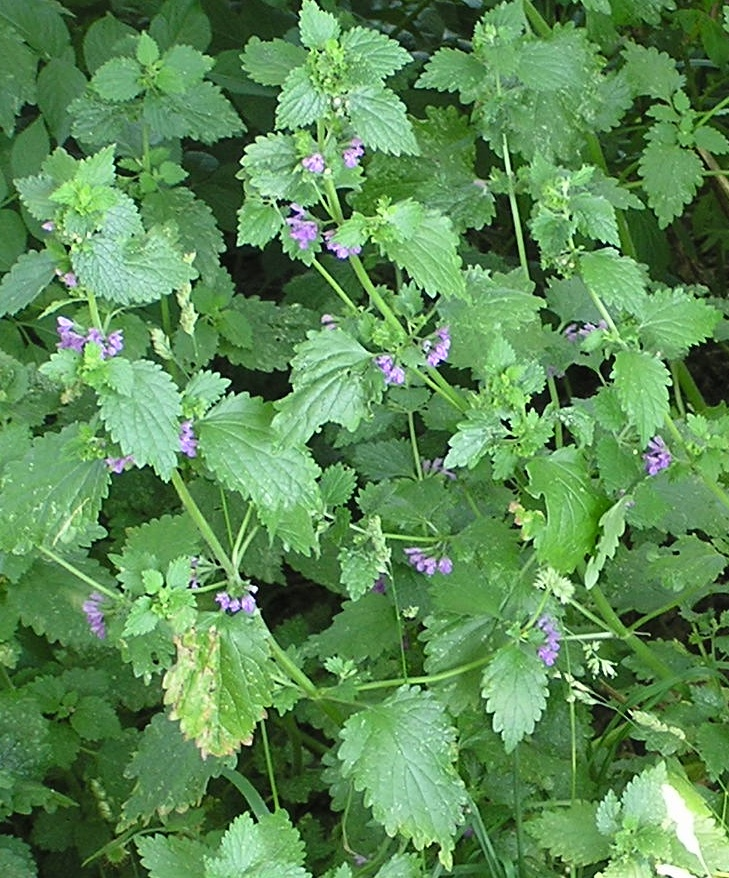
- Ballota nigra

Scientific classification
- Kingdom: Plantae
- Clade: Tracheophytes
- Clade: Angiosperms
- Clade: Eudicots
- Clade: Asterids
- Order: Lamiales
- Family: Lamiaceae
- Subfamily: Lamioideae
- Genus: Ballota; L.

Type species
- Ballota nigra L.

= Ballota =

Horehound

Genus of flowering plants in the sage family

Ballota (horehound) is a genus of flowering evergreen perennial plants and subshrubs in the family Lamiaceae. It is native to temperate regions; the Mediterranean region has the highest diversity in the genus, with more isolated locations in South Africa, Central Asia, northern Europe, and the islands of the eastern North Atlantic. It is found in rocky and waste ground.

Ballota is paraphyletic and will eventually be officially re-circumscribed. It is closely related to Moluccella and Marrubium. Some of its species had previously been placed in Marrubium. Other species have already been split to Pseudodictamnus

Ballota species are used as food plants by the larvae of some Lepidoptera including Coleophora case-bearers: C. ballotella, C. lineolea (which has been recorded on B. nigra) and C. ochripennella.

Species

- Ballota adenophora Hedge – Saudi Arabia
- Ballota andreuzziana Pamp. – Libya
- Ballota antalyensis Tezcan & H.Duman – Turkey
- Ballota antilibanotica Post – Syria, Lebanon
- Ballota byblensis Semaan & R.M.Haber – Lebanon
- Ballota cristata P.H.Davis – Antalya region of Turkey
- Ballota glandulosissima Hub.-Mor. & Patzak – Turkey
- Ballota grisea Pojark. – Caucasus
- Ballota kaiseri Täckh. – Sinai
- Ballota larendana Boiss. & Heldr. – Turkey
- Ballota luteola Velen – Saudi Arabia
- Ballota macrodonta Boiss. & Balansa – Nigde region of Turkey
- Ballota nigra L. – most of Europe; North Africa, Middle East as far east as Iran; naturalized in New Zealand, Argentina, North America
- Ballota philistaea Bornm. – Israel
- Ballota platyloma Rech.f. – Iran
- Ballota saxatilis Sieber ex C.Presl – Middle East from Turkey to Saudi Arabia
- Ballota sechmenii Gemici & Leblebici – Turkey
- Ballota vellerea Maire, Weiller & Wilczek – Morocco
