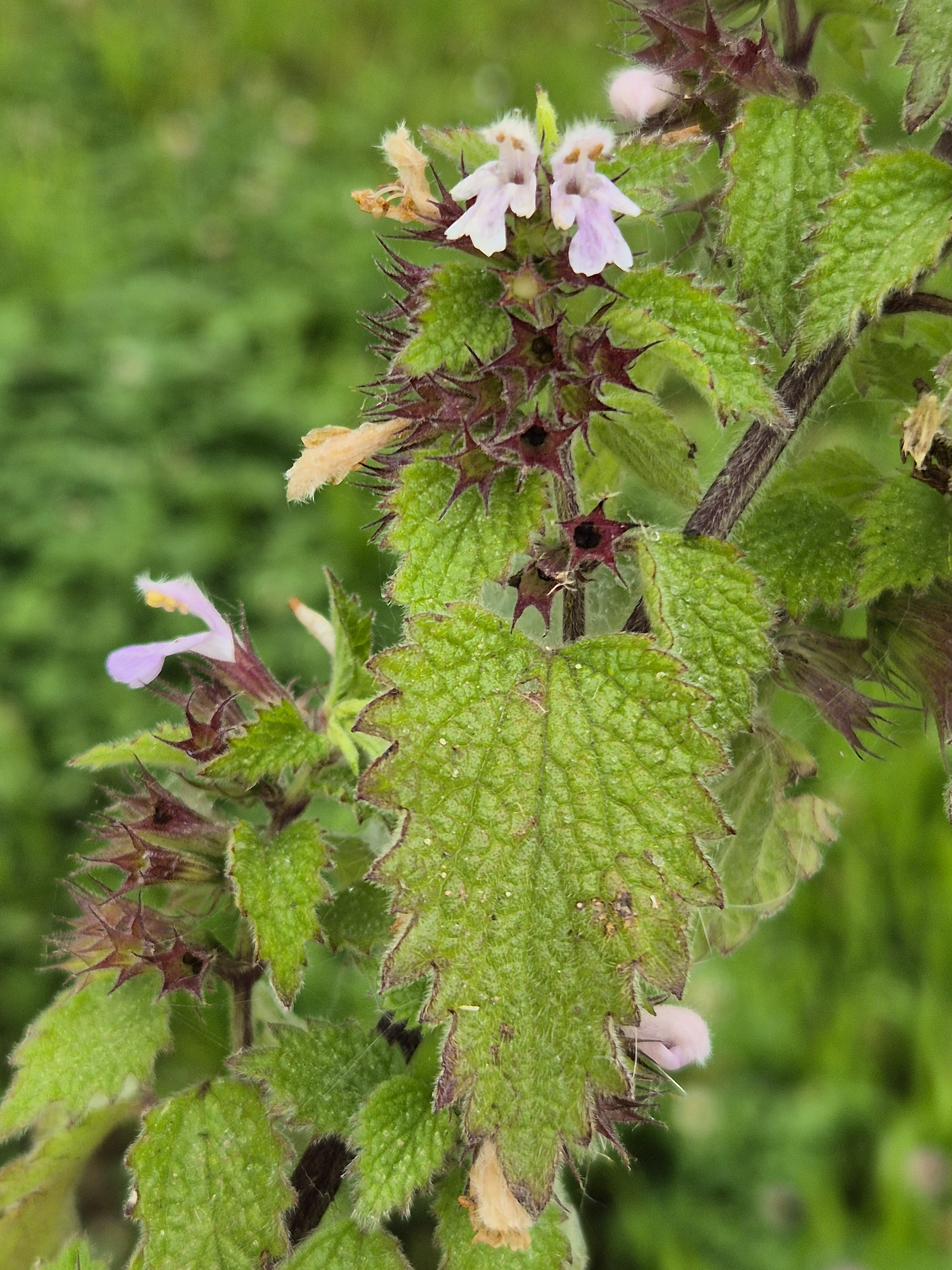
- Ballota nigra subsp. nigra in Lower Austria

Scientific classification
- Kingdom: Plantae
- Clade: Tracheophytes
- Clade: Angiosperms
- Clade: Eudicots
- Clade: Asterids
- Order: Lamiales
- Family: Lamiaceae
- Genus: Ballota
- Species: B. nigra

Binomial name
- Ballota nigra L.
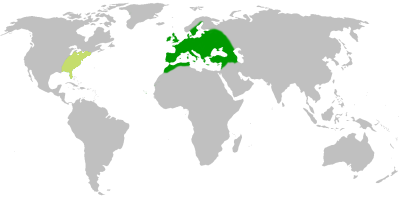
- Range of Ballota nigra. Green: native. Yellowish: introduced.

Synonyms
- Marrubium nigrum (L.) Garsault; Ballota foetida Lam.; Ballota sordida Salisb.; Stachys ballota Kuntze; Ballota velutina Posp.; Ballota sepium Paulet ex Pers.; Ballota urticifolia Ortmann ex Nestl.; Ballota aristata Rchb.; Ballota ampliata Willd. ex Steud.; Ballota hirta Steud.; Ballota rubra Schrad. ex Steud.; Ballota bracteosa Ball; Ballota submitis (Borbás) Borbás

= Ballota nigra =

Species of flowering plant in the sage family

Ballota nigra, the black horehound, is a perennial herb in the family Lamiaceae. It is native to Europe, the Mediterranean region and east to central Asia. It is also naturalised in Argentina, New Zealand, and the eastern United States. It blooms in the Northern Hemisphere from May to August.

== Description ==
Ballota nigra has a very strong characteristic smell reminiscent of mould or damp soil, and can be recognised by its clusters of hairy, reddish-purple flowers. It can grow up to 1 m (3 ft 3 in) tall.

=== Stem and root ===
It has erect herbaceous stems, wooden and branched at bottom, covered by downy hairs. The plant has a taproot system.

=== Leaves ===
The leaves are opposite and decussate, and range from oval-lanceolate to heart-shaped, with crenate or dentate border. They are dark green and usually pubescent, measuring 2–8 cm by 2–6 cm, and have a 1–3 cm petiole. Upper face is wrinkled, with a net-like vein pattern.

=== Flowers ===
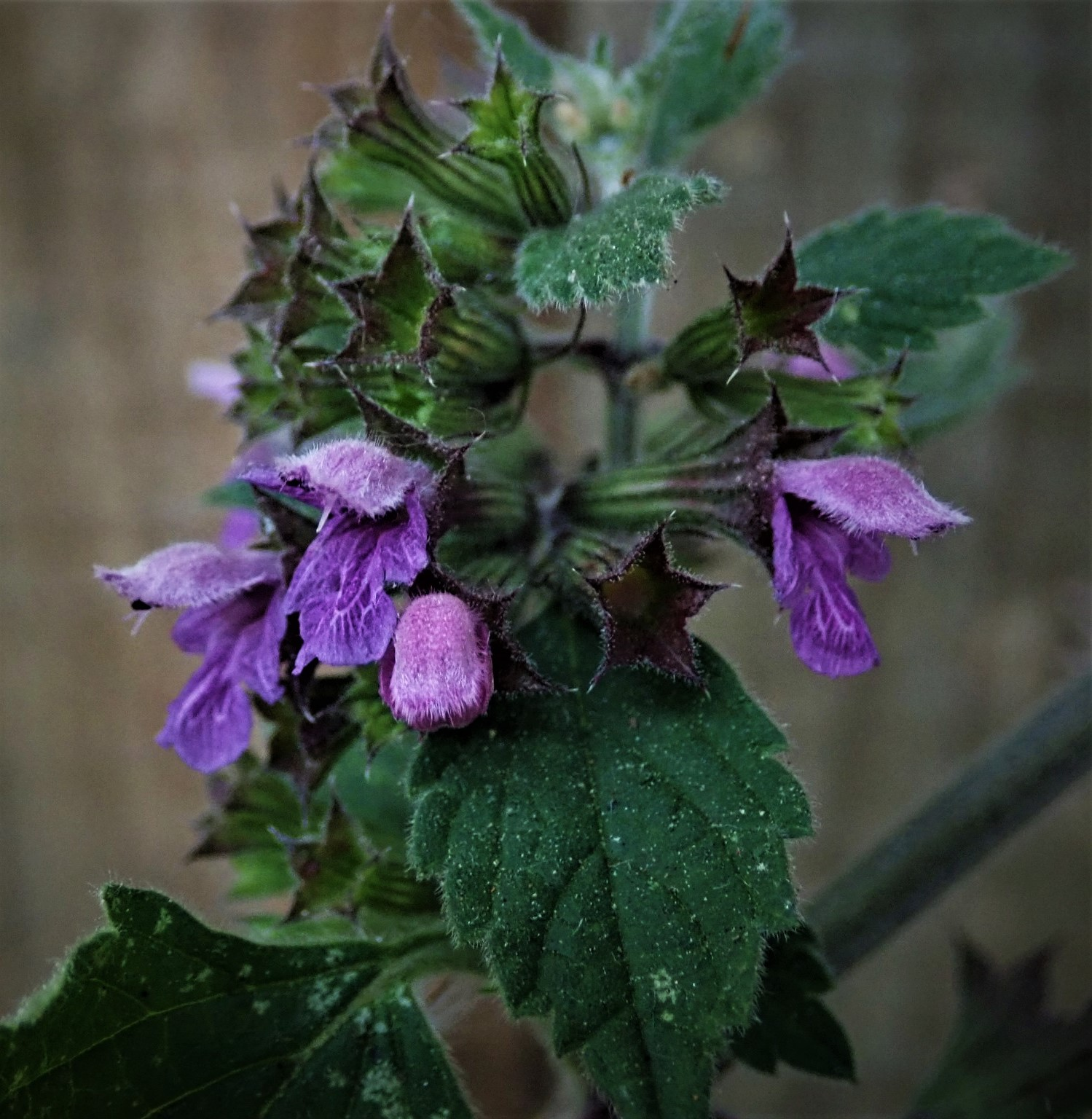
Black horehound flowers

The flowers are arranged in verticillasters, subspherical to one-sided, with 15–30 flowers. Each verticillaster consist of two condensed dichasial cymes in the axils of normal leaves.

Each flower has an actinomorphic calyx, length 9–10 mm, width 7 mm, made up of five sepals fused together in a tube with five teeths; and a labiate corolla of 12–14 mm, ranging from pink to pale purple to withish. The corolla consist of a tube of about 6 mm and two lips; the upper one slightly concave (like a hood) and externally hairy; the lower one glabrous, with two minor lateral lobes and a major central bifid lobe. There are four didynamous stamens, running parallel under the upper lip, with glabrous filaments and yellow anthers. The ovary is superior, with a single white style and a 2-parted stigma.

Below the calyx there are five filiform bracts, 8 mm long. The flowers are pollinated by a wide variety of different bee species.

=== Fruit ===
Each fertilised flower produces a tetrad of black nutlets, cylindrical to ovoid, 2 mm long, partially or fully covered by the calyx. The basal end is flat and attached to the receptacle, while the top end is rounded or pointed.

== Taxonomy ==
The plant was described by Linnaeus in Species Plantarum (May 1753). The name Ballota comes from the Greek ballo (to reject), because of the strong offensive smell of the plant; cattle will not eat it. The specific name nigra could refer to the black colour of dried leaves.

=== Subspecies ===
The following subspecies are accepted:

1. Ballota nigra subsp. anatolica P.H.Davis – Iran, Turkey
2. Ballota nigra subsp. anomala Greuter – Greece
3. Ballota nigra subsp. meridionalis (Bég.) Bég. (syn. B. n. subsp. foetida (Vis.) Hayek) – central + southern Europe; naturalised in Sweden, Ukraine, Cyprus, Turkey, Argentina
4. Ballota nigra subsp. kurdica P.H.Davis – Iran, Iraq, Turkey
5. Ballota nigra subsp. nigra – southern and central Europe, Great Britain, Sweden, Caucasus, Iran, Turkey; naturalised in Belgium, New Zealand, Argentina
6. Ballota nigra subsp. ruderalis (Sw.) Briq. – Mediterranean region; Canary Islands, Madeira, Azores
7. Ballota nigra subsp. sericea (Vandas) Patzak – Albania, Macedonia, Greece
8. Ballota nigra subsp. velutina (Posp.) Patzak – Slovenia, Croatia; naturalised in Argentina

=== Etymology ===
The common name comes from the Old English words har, meaning "downy or hoary", and hune, meaning the plant itself. This name refers to the hairs that give the herb its distinctive appearance. In modern times, some alternative medicine practitioners have referred to the plant as "seed of Horus" and claiming that horehound takes its name from Horus, the Egyptian sun god.

== Habitat ==
Ballota nigra is a nitrophilous plant; it grows in ruins, fallows, and hedges at elevations up to 1,300 m (4,300 ft). It prefers loose, calcareous (alkaline) soils. It tolerates temperatures as low as -5°/-10 °C.

== Uses ==
Usually the plant is used dry and harvested when blooming. Syrups can be made from fresh plants.

=== Biochemistry ===
Ballota nigra contains diterpenoids like marrubiin, ballonigrin, ballotinone, ballotenol and 7-acetoxymarrubiin.

== See also ==
- White horehound
