= List of wetland plants =

This is a list of plants that grow in wetland environments, including aquatic plants and plants that live in the ecotones between terrestrial and aquatic environments.

== Major cosmopolitan groups ==
These are groups with members found in wetland environments throughout the world.

- Ceratophyllum demersum is a cosmopolitan species of aquatic plant.
- Drosera, the sundews, are carnivorous plants with species found on every continent except Antarctica.
- Equisetum, Horsetails, are ferns that grow on every continent except Oceania and Antarctica.
- Duckweeds are tiny flowering plants that float on the surface of water, with members of the group found worldwide.
- Isoetes is a cosmopolitan genus of lycophyte known as the quillworts.
- Juncus is a genus of monocot commonly known as rushes, found in every continent except Antarctica.
  - Juncus effusus
- Mangroves are trees or shrubs that grow in salt or brackish water along coastlines. The group consists of numerous unrelated plants that have convergently evolved. Sometimes, the widely distributed genus Rhizophora is referred to as the true mangroves.
- Pistia, a genus with one species that is native to tropical environments and has further extended its range as an introduced species.
- Phragmites is a genus of plants known as reeds.
- Pondweeds are a family of aquatic plant with a subcosmopolitan distribution.
- Sagittaria is a genus of plants known as arrowhead or katniss.
- Salix, the willows, are native to many areas throughout the world, usually in riparian ecosystems.
- Salvinia natans, the floating fern, is native in Africa, Asia, Europe, South America, and introduced elsewhere.
- Sedges are a large family of grass-like plants with many species that form a characteristic part of wetland vegetation.
  - Bolboschoenus, club rushes.
  - Carex, the true sedges, contains over 2,000 species, primarily found in wetland environments.
  - Eleocharis, the spikerushes.
  - Scirpus, bulrushes.
- Sphagnum is a genus of moss that is found primarily in the Northern Hemisphere, as well as in some areas of South America, New Zealand and Tasmania. Sphagnum moss is notable because it forms peat.
- Sporobolus, cordgrasses.
- Typha, known as cattails or bulrushes, are found throughout the world and a characteristic plant of wetland environments.
- Utricularia, known as the bladderworts, are carnivorous plants with species found worldwide.
- Water lilies are aquatic flowering plants with leaves that float on the surface of bodies of water.

== By distribution ==
=== Asia ===
- Acorus calamus, sweetflag
- Acrostichum aureum
- Aegiceras corniculatum, black mangrove
- Avicennia marina
- Avicennia officinalis, Indian mangrove
- Azolla, mosquito ferns
- Barclaya longifolia
- Barringtonia acutangula
- Bruguiera gymnorhiza, the large-leafed orange mangrove
- Dacrydium pectinatum, Mélo
- Eleocharis palustris, common spikerush
- Euryale ferox, prickly waterlily
- Excoecaria agallocha, the milky mangrove
- Glyptostrobus pensilis, the Chinese swamp cypress, highly endangered
- Iris halophila
- Kandelia candel, a mangrove species
- Lepironia articulata, the gray sedge
- Lycopus lucidus
- Lysimachia maritima
- Metasequoia glyptostroboides, Dawn redwood
- Nechamandra alternifolia
- Nelumbo nucifera, the sacred lotus
- Nymphaea nouchali, the blue water lily
- Nypa fruticans, mangrove palm
- Oryza coarctata, syn. Porteresia coarctata, a type of wild rice that grows in estuaries
- Persicaria hydropiper
- Persicaria thunbergii
- Potamogeton distinctus
- Podocarpus polystachyus, Sea teak
- Rhizophora mucronata
- Sagittaria guayanensis
- Sagittaria trifolia
- Salix cheilophila
- Salix pierotii
- Suaeda salsa, seepweed
- Typha orientalis, a species of cattail
- Zizania latifolia

=== Africa ===
- Cyperus papyrus, papyrus
- Echinochloa pyramidalis, antelope grass
- Ficus verruculosa, water fig
- Fimbristylis dichotoma
- Miscanthus junceus
- Phoenix reclinata wild date palm
- Prionium serratum, palmiet, a South African endemic
- Podocarpus elongatus
- Rhizophora mucronata
- Syzygium cordatum
- Trapa natans
- Typha australis
- Vossia cuspidata, hippo grass

=== Europe ===
- Calamagrostis pseudophragmites
- Dactylorhiza majalis, broad-leaved marsh orchid
- Damasonium alisma, star fruit
- Eleocharis palustris, common spikerush
- Eriophorum sedge, known as cotton grass or bog cotton
- Hottonia palustris
- Leucojum aestivum, summer snowflake
- Lysimachia maritima
- Menyanthes trifoliata, bogbean
- Myrica gale, bog-myrtle
- Narthecium ossifragum, bog-asphodel
- Persicaria hydropiper
- Pinus sylvestris, Scots Pine
- Sphagnum moss

=== North America ===
- Acorus americanus, American sweetflag
- Acer rubrum, Red maple
- Anchistea virginica, Virginia chain fern
- Asclepias incarnata, swamp milkweed
- Borrichia frutescens, sea oxeye
- Betula nigra, River Birch
- Caltha palustris, marsh marigold
- Cephalanthus occidentalis, buttonbush
- Cornus florida, Flowering dogwood
- Cornus foemina, Swamp dogwood
- Chamaecyparis thyoides, Atlantic white cedar
- Eleocharis palustris, common spikerush
- Hibiscus moscheutos, marsh mallow
- Iris virginica, southern blue flag
- Larix laricina, Tamarack larch
- Liquidambar styraciflua, American sweetgum
- Lycopus americanus, American bugleweed
- Lysimachia maritima
- Persicaria hydropiper
- Platanus occidentalis, American sycamore
- Picea glauca, White spruce
- Pinus serotina, Pond pine
- Quercus bicolor, Swamp White Oak
- Sacciolepis striata
- Salix nigra, black willow
- Sarracenia, North American pitcher plants
- Saururus cernuus, lizard's tail
- Tamala palustris, Swamp Bay
- Taxus canadensis, Canadian yew
- Taxodium ascendens, pond cypress
- Taxodium distichum, bald cypress
- Taxodium mucronatum, Montezuma bald cypress
- Thuja occidentalis, Northern white-cedar
- Magnolia virginiana, Sweetbay magnolia
- Nelumbo lutea, American lotus
- Nuphar lutea, Spatterdock
- Nymphaea odorata, fragrant water lily
- Nyssa biflora, swamp tupelo tree
- Nyssa aquatica, water tupelo tree

=== South America ===
- Alternanthera philoxeroides
- Hydrocotyle ranunculoides, floating marshpennywort
- Hydrocotyle verticillata
- Limnobium laevigatum
- Limnocharis flava
- Luziola peruviana
- Myriophyllum aquaticum, parrot's feather, is now introduced worldwide but originates in the Amazon River.
- Nymphoides humboldtiana
- Pontederia crassipes, the common water hyacinth, has been introduced worldwide but is native to South America
- Pilgerodendron uviferum, Ciprés de las Guaitecas
- Pontederia subovata
- Sarcocornia ambigua
- Syagrus romanzoffiana, queen palm
- Victoria cruziana, Santa Cruz waterlily

=== Oceania ===
- Aegiceras corniculatum, black mangrove
- Avicennia marina, gray mangrove
- Athrotaxis cupressoides, Pencil pine
- Azolla filiculoides red mosquitofern, found in Tasmania
- Bruguiera gymnorhiza, the large-leafed orange mangrove
- Casuarina glauca, the swamp she-oak, found in inland Australia
- Callitris oblonga, river pine
- Cordyline australis, endemic to New Zealand
- Dicksonia squarrosa, the New Zealand tree fern, endemic to New Zealand
- Dacrycarpus dacrydioides, kahikatea, endemic to New Zealand
- Duma florulenta, tangled lignum
- Lagarostrobos franklinii, Huon pine
- Eleocharis sphacelata, giant spikesedge
- Eucalyptus robusta
- Marsilea drummondii, a widespread aquatic fern in inland Australia known as nardoo
- Melaleuca ericifolia
- Nymphoides crenata, the wavy marshwort, endemic to Australia
- Ottelia ovalifolia
- Persicaria hydropiper
- Rhizophora mucronata
- Rhizophora stylosa
- Retrophyllum minus
- Samolus repens, the sea primrose
- Typha orientalis, a species of cattail
- Villarsia, a genus of aquatic flowering plants
