= Horehound =

Horehound or hoarhound may refer to:

== Plants ==
- Ballota (also horehound), a genus of flowering evergreen perennial plants and subshrubs in the family Lamiaceae
  - Ballota acetabulosa (also Greek horehound), a species of flowering plant in the family Lamiaceae
  - Ballota nigra (also black horehound), a perennial herb of the family Lamiaceae
  - Ballota undulata (also horehound), a species of flowering plant in the family Lamiaceae
- Lycopus (also waterhorehound), a genus in the family Lamiaceae
  - Lycopus americanus (also American water horehound), a member of the genus Lycopus
  - Lycopus amplectens (also water-horehound and sessile-leaved water-horehound), a species of Lycopus native to North America
  - Lycopus virginicus (also Virginia water horehound and American water hoarhound), a species of flowering plant in the mint family
- Marrubium (also horehound or hoarhound), a genus of flowering plants in the family Lamiaceae
  - Marrubium vulgare (also white horehound or common horehound), a flowering plant in the mint family

== Other ==
- Horehound (album), the debut studio album by American rock band the Dead Weather
- Horehound beer, a soft drink carbonated beverage
- Horehound bug, a stink bug which sucks the sap of the horehound plant
- Horehound candy drops, bittersweet hard candies like cough drops that are made with sugar and an extract of M. vulgare
- Wheeleria spilodactylus (also the horehound plume moth), a moth of the family Pterophoridae
