= Shiquan River Sand Control Project =

During the 1980s, ecological degradation and soil erosion resulted in severe sandstorms and the decline of the living conditions in Shiquanhe Town. To inhibit additional sand encroachment, the Ngari Prefecture formally initiated the Shiquan River Sand Control Project (Chinese: 狮泉河盆地生物防沙治沙工程) in 1994.

== Progress ==
Since the initiation of the sand control project, the Ngari Prefecture has consistently prioritized the Shiquanhe Town Basin biological sand control initiative as a crucial measure to advance ecological civilization, enhance and secure livelihoods. This endeavor has involved a cumulative investment of 150 million yuan, resulting in the afforestation of 22,754 acres, the planting of 4.5 million trees, and the cultivation of 6,100 acres of grass. The project has predominantly utilized local tree species such as Salix bangongensis and Tamarix ramosissima, supplemented by introduced species including Hippophae rhamnoides subsp. gyantsensis and Salix cheilophila, encompassing a total of seven tree species. The Ngari Prefecture allocates about 700,000 yuan annually for afforestation management in the town of Shiquanhe, ensuring a tree survival rate and afforestation preservation rate exceeding 80%.

The occurrence of wind and sand in Shiquanhe Town has been mitigated, the frost-free duration has grown from 83 days in 1994 to 170 days in 2017, and the annual average precipitation has risen from 76.5 millimeters in 1994 to 140 millimeters in 2017.

== See also ==
- Lhasa North and South Mountain Greening Project
- Sengge Zangbo
