= Barbalin =

Barbalin may refer to:

- a synonym for aloin A, a constituent of aloin
- Barbalin, Western Australia
