= Bittering agent =

Flavoring agent

A bittering agent is a flavoring agent added to a food or beverage to impart a bitter taste, possibly in addition to other effects. While many substances are bitter to a greater or lesser degree, a few substances are used specifically for their bitterness, especially to balance other flavors, such as sweetness. Notable beverage examples include caffeine, found naturally in tea and coffee and added to many soft drinks, hops in beer, and quinine in tonic water.

Food examples include bitter melon, which may be mixed into a stir fry or soup for its bitter flavor.

Potent bittering agents may also be added to dangerous products as aversive agents to make them foul tasting, so as to prevent accidental poisoning. Examples including anti-freeze, household cleaning products and pesticides such as slug pellets. In general, dangerous products with bright colours, which may be appealing to children, often contain agents such as denatonium. However, the efficacy of using bittering agents for this purpose is not conclusive.

== Beer ==
Prior to the introduction of hops, many other bitter herbs and flowers were used as bittering agents in beer, in a mixture called gruit, which could include dandelion, burdock root, marigold, horehound (the German name for horehound means "mountain hops"), ground ivy, and heather. Also bog myrtle.

More recently, some Chinese and Okinawan beer uses bitter melon as a bittering agent.

== Other substances ==
Various other substances are used, including:

- Aloin
- Gesho, used in Tej, Ethiopian honey wine

== Other uses ==
Other prominent uses of bittering agents include:

- Bitters – used as digestifs or flavorings
- Dandelion and burdock – traditional British soft drink
