= L. europaeus =

L. europaeus may refer to:

- Lepus europaeus, the European hare, brown hare, Eastern jackrabbit or Eastern prairie hare, a mammal species native to northern, central and western Europe and western Asia
- Lycopus europaeus, the gypsywort, gipsywort, bugleweed, European bugleweed, water horehound or ou di sun, a perennial plant species native to Europe and Asia, and naturalized in the United States
