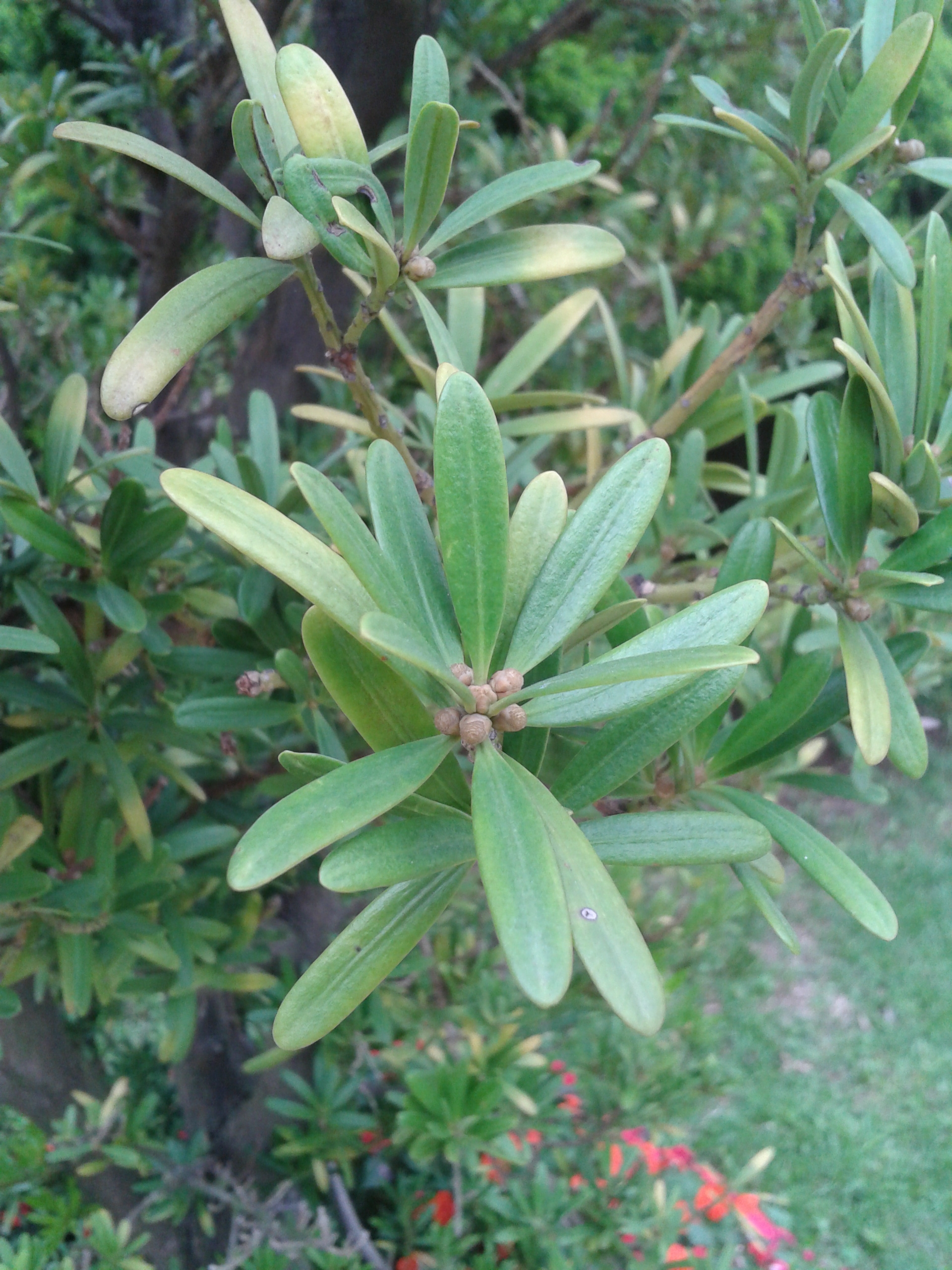

Conservation status
- Endangered (IUCN 3.1)

Scientific classification
- Kingdom: Plantae
- Clade: Tracheophytes
- Clade: Gymnosperms
- Division: Pinophyta
- Class: Pinopsida
- Order: Araucariales
- Family: Podocarpaceae
- Genus: Podocarpus
- Species: P. costalis

Binomial name
- Podocarpus costalis C.Presl

Synonyms
- Nageia costalis (C.Presl) Kuntze; Podocarpus costalis var. taiwanensis Gaussen

= Podocarpus costalis =

Species of conifer

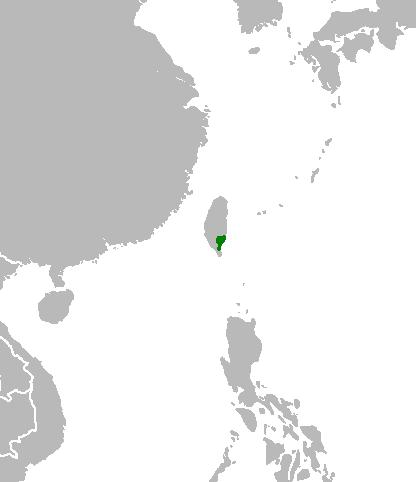
Podocarpus costalis range

Podocarpus costalis, locally arius, is a species of conifer in the family Podocarpaceae. It is native to the Philippines and Taiwan.

This plant grows in island scrub, low forest, or in a limestone bluff or sea stack habitat, growing at elevations from sea level to nearly 300 meters. It is also widely cultivated as a garden plant and is used in bonsai. The fruit is edible.

One threat to the survival of wild populations is overcollecting for horticulture; this practice is illegal throughout its native range.

The species was described by Carl Borivoj Presl in 1851.

== Description ==
Podocarpus costalis is a small, shrubby tree, usually ranging from one to five meters high. It has bud of foliage two to four millimeters long. The plant it is often confused with P. polystachyus because of the similar habitats and leaves.

== Conservation ==
The plant is endangered largely on account of its minuscule area of occupancy of about 24 square kilometers. It is limited to five islands and localities, and its growth is naturally limited to a specific habitat. It has also become endangered because of continual removal of mature plants for horticulture or as potted plants, depleting its population. The plants have been taken from the wild to be planted in gardens in Luzon and Taiwan, only increasing the rate of removal.

Countries with the plant natively have legally protected it, with countries such as the Philippines and Taiwan making the collection of the plant from the wild illegal. Those interested in the plant have been advised to grow the plant by seed to avoid removing any more of the plants from their natural habitat.
