= Creeping spikerush =

Creeping spikerush is a common name for several plants and may refer to:

- Eleocharis fallax
- Eleocharis palustris
