= Acacia graniticola =

Scientific classification
- Kingdom: Plantae
- Clade: Tracheophytes
- Clade: Angiosperms
- Clade: Eudicots
- Clade: Rosids
- Order: Fabales
- Family: Fabaceae
- Subfamily: Caesalpinioideae
- Clade: Mimosoid clade
- Genus: Acacia
- Species: A. graniticola

Binomial name
- Acacia graniticola Maslin
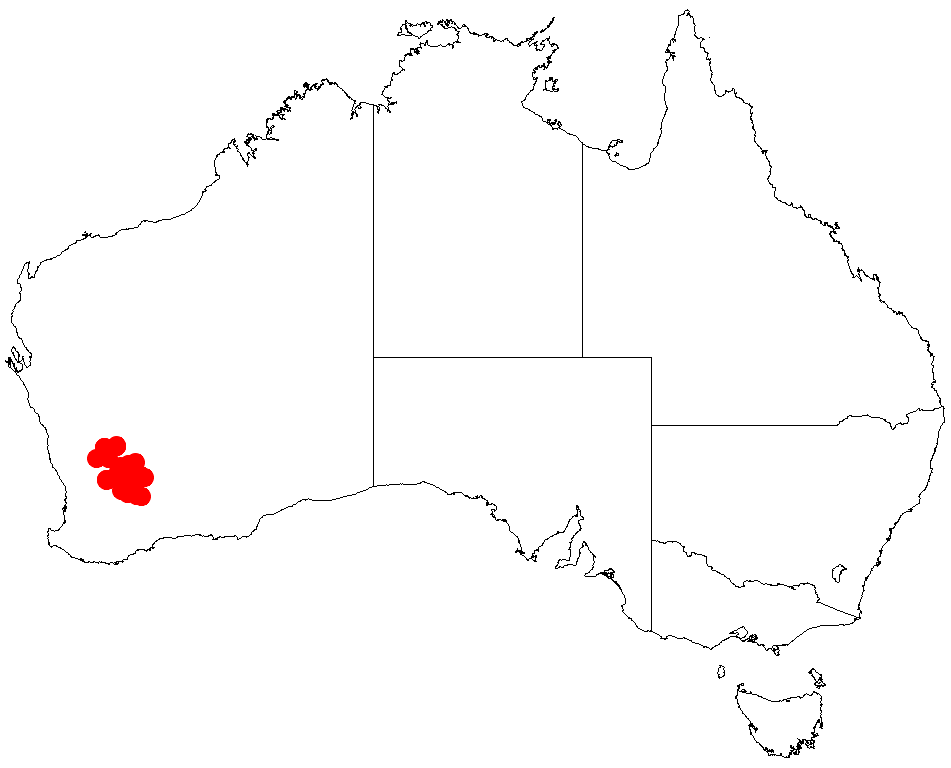
- Occurrence data from AVH

Synonyms
- Racosperma graniticola (Maslin) Pedley

Species of legume

Habit in Sandford Rocks Nature Reserve

Acacia graniticola is a species of flowering plant in the family Fabaceae and is endemic to the south-west of Western Australia. It is a much-branched, intricate, spreading, glabrous shrub with sessile, linear, leathery phyllodes, spherical or elliptic heads of golden yellow flowers and linear, papery to thinly leathery, glabrous pods.

== Description ==
Acacia graniticola is a much-branched, intricate, spreading, glabrous shrub that typically grows to a height of 1–3 m (3 ft 3 in – 9 ft 10 in), its young branchlets, phyllodes and peduncles with scattered, more or less circular, flat resinous pimples. The phyllodes are sessile, linear, curved to winding, mostly 90–150 mm (3.5–5.9 in) long 1–3 mm (0.039–0.118 in) wide and leathery, usually with a gland 2–8 mm (0.079–0.315 in) above the base. The flowers are borne in seven to twelve spherical or elliptic heads in racemes 25–55 mm (0.98–2.17 in) long on peduncles 6–25 mm (0.24–0.98 in) long, sometimes the racemes appearing simple. The heads are 4.5–5.0 mm (0.18–0.20 in) wide with 35 to 40 golden yellow flowers. Flowering occurs from August to October, and the pods are linear, up to 80 mm (3.1 in) long, 4 mm (0.16 in) wide, papery to thinly leathery and glabrous.

== Taxonomy ==
Acacia graniticola was first formally described in 1999 by Bruce Maslin in the journal Nuytsia from specimens collected 4.8 km (3.0 mi) north of the Mukinbudin-Bencubbin road on the Barbalin North Road in 1982. The specific epithet (graniticola) means 'granite-inhabiting'.

== Distribution and habitat ==
This species of wattle grows in sand, sandy-clay or loam at the base of granite outcrops, sometimes in scrub or shrubland, in semi-arid areas in the Avon Wheatbelt, Coolgardie and Yalgoo bioregions in the south-west of Western Australia .

== Conservation status ==
Acacia graniticola is listed as "not threatened" by the Government of Western Australia Department of Biodiversity, Conservation and Attractions.

== See also ==
- List of Acacia species
