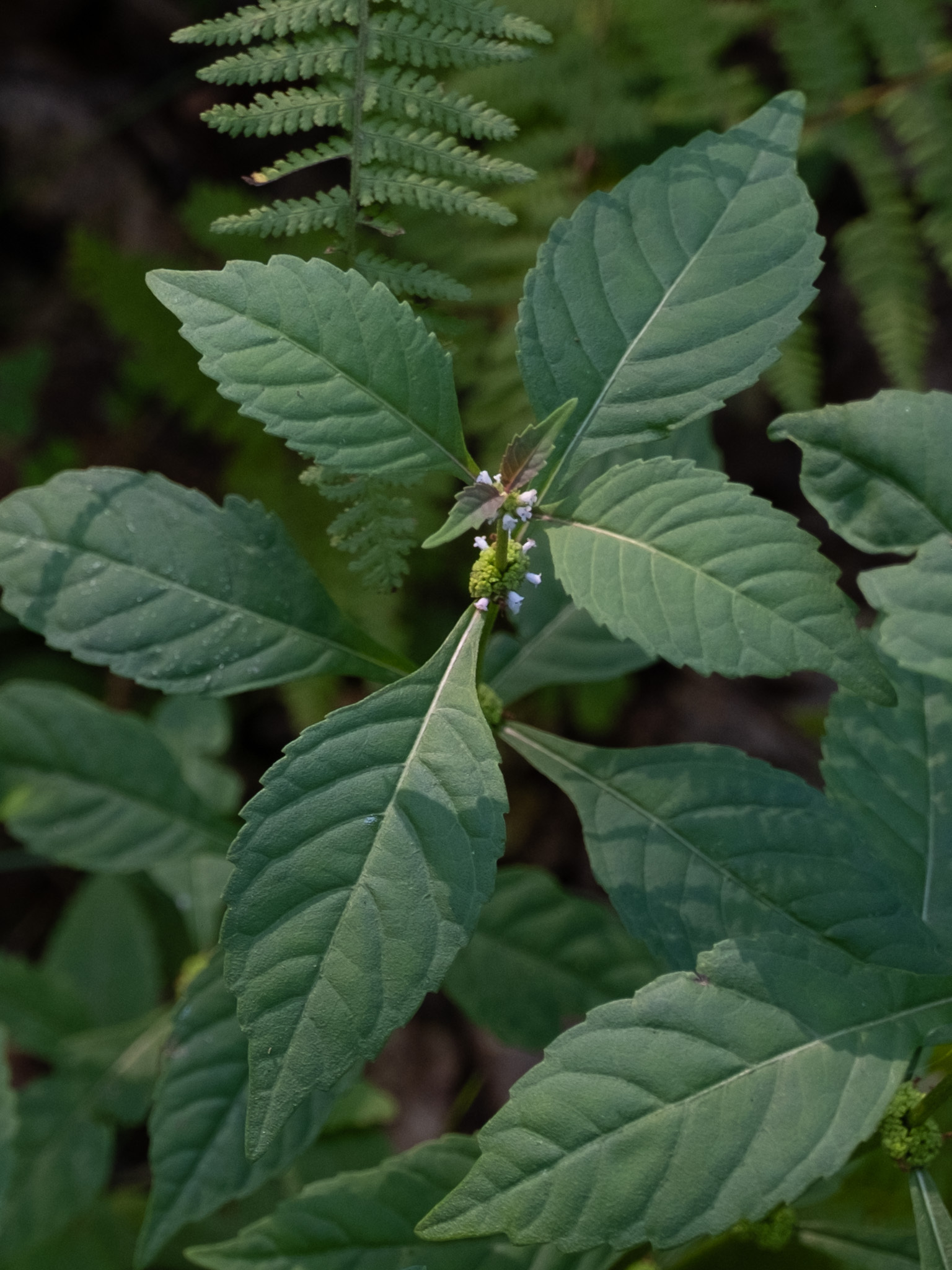

Conservation status
- Secure (NatureServe)

Scientific classification
- Kingdom: Plantae
- Clade: Tracheophytes
- Clade: Angiosperms
- Clade: Eudicots
- Clade: Asterids
- Order: Lamiales
- Family: Lamiaceae
- Genus: Lycopus
- Species: L. virginicus

Binomial name
- Lycopus virginicus L.

Synonyms
- Lycopus communis Lycopus membranaceus

= Lycopus virginicus =

Species of flowering plant

Lycopus virginicus is a species of flowering plant in the mint family known by many common names, including Virginia water horehound, American water hoarhound, sweet bugleweed, water bugle, carpenter's herb, green archangel, purple archangel, wolf foot, and Egyptian's herb. It is native to North America, where it is widespread in eastern Canada and the eastern United States.

This is a perennial herb with a hairy, squared stem reaching a meter tall. The oppositely arranged leaves have oval to lance-shaped blades with toothed edges. The leaves are dark green or purple. Clusters of tiny white or pink-tinged flowers occur in the leaf axils. The plant has a mint scent and a bitter taste. This species can be easily confused with Lycopus uniflorus. The latter has stamens exserted from the flowers, while the stamens of L. virginicus are included. The two species may hybridize, producing Lycopus × sherardii.

Habitat types include damp, shady places. It can be found in riparian zones, such as floodplains. It grows in wet spots in forests, woodlands, and swamps.

This plant has had uses in traditional herbal medicine. It was perhaps best known as a treatment for hyperthyroidism conditions, including Graves' disease and thyrotoxicosis. Indications included signs and symptoms such as dyspnea, tachycardia, tremor, and exophthalmia. Medical research has not validated the use of the herb for these conditions. It was also used for anxiety, insomnia, and respiratory ailments such as pneumonia, bronchitis, hemoptysis, and chronic cough. In Native American tradition, the Iroquois considered the plant poisonous, but the Cherokee found it useful for treating snakebite in people and in dogs. It was given to infants to help them learn to speak, and it had ceremonial uses.
