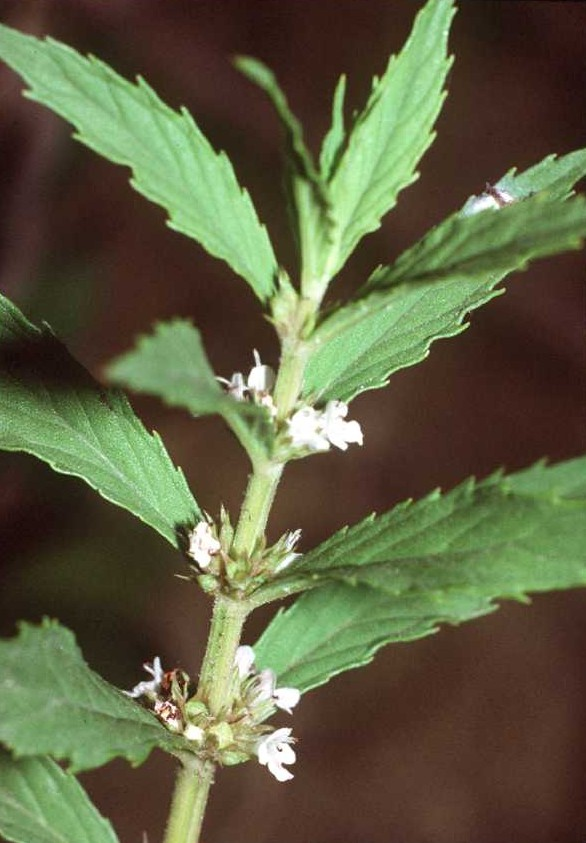

Conservation status
- Secure (NatureServe)

Scientific classification
- Kingdom: Plantae
- Clade: Tracheophytes
- Clade: Angiosperms
- Clade: Eudicots
- Clade: Asterids
- Order: Lamiales
- Family: Lamiaceae
- Genus: Lycopus
- Species: L. asper

Binomial name
- Lycopus asper Greene

Synonyms
- Lycopus maritimus Greene; Lycopus obtusifolius Benth.; Phytosalpinx aspera (Greene) Lunell

= Lycopus asper =

Plant species in the mint family

Lycopus asper is a species of flowering plant in the mint family known by the common name rough bugleweed. It is native to much of North America, where it can be found most often in moist areas, such as the soil near lakes. This is a perennial herb growing from a rhizome with thick, knobby tips. The plant grows erect to around 80 centimeters in maximum height, but is known to reach one meter. Its stem is lined with pairs of toothed leaves with heads of flowers in their axils. The flower is white and a few millimeters in length.
