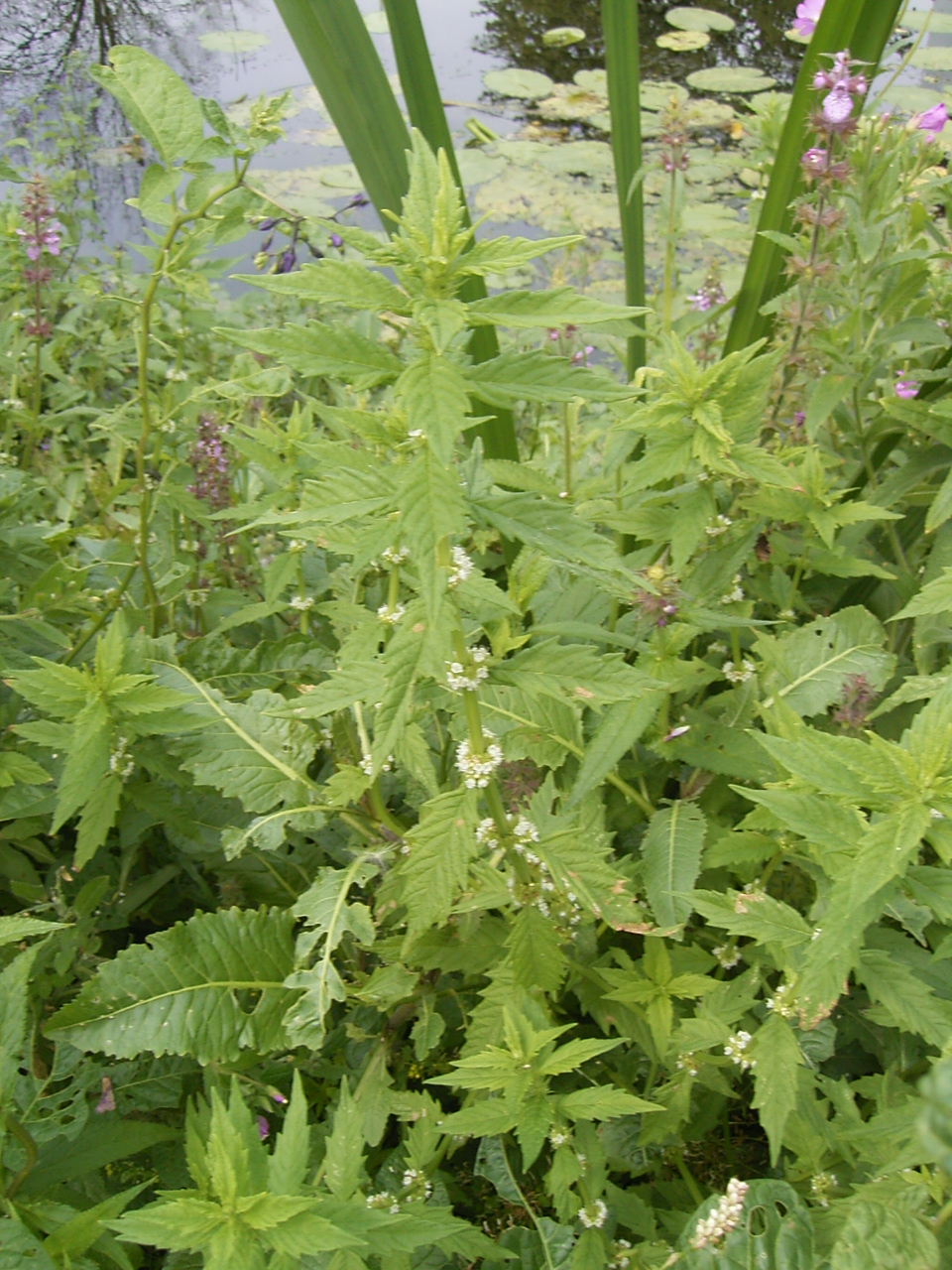

Conservation status
- Least Concern (IUCN 3.1)

Scientific classification
- Kingdom: Plantae
- Clade: Tracheophytes
- Clade: Angiosperms
- Clade: Eudicots
- Clade: Asterids
- Order: Lamiales
- Family: Lamiaceae
- Genus: Lycopus
- Species: L. europaeus

Binomial name
- Lycopus europaeus L.

Synonyms
- Lycopus alboroseus Gilib. nom. inval.; Lycopus albus Mazziari; Lycopus aquaticus Moench; Lycopus decrescens K.Koch; Lycopus laciniatus Marz.-Penc. ex Pollini; Lycopus menthifolius Mabille; Lycopus mollis A.Kern.; Lycopus niger Gueldenst.; Lycopus palustris Burm.f.; Lycopus riparius Salisb. nom. illeg.; Lycopus solanifolius Lojac.; Lycopus souliei Sennen; Lycopus vulgaris Pers.

= Lycopus europaeus =

Gypsywort

Species of flowering plant

Lycopus europaeus, common names gypsywort, gipsywort, bugleweed, European bugleweed and water horehound, is a perennial plant in the genus Lycopus, native to Europe and Asia, and naturalized elsewhere. Another species, Lycopus americanus has also been erroneously called L. europaeus.

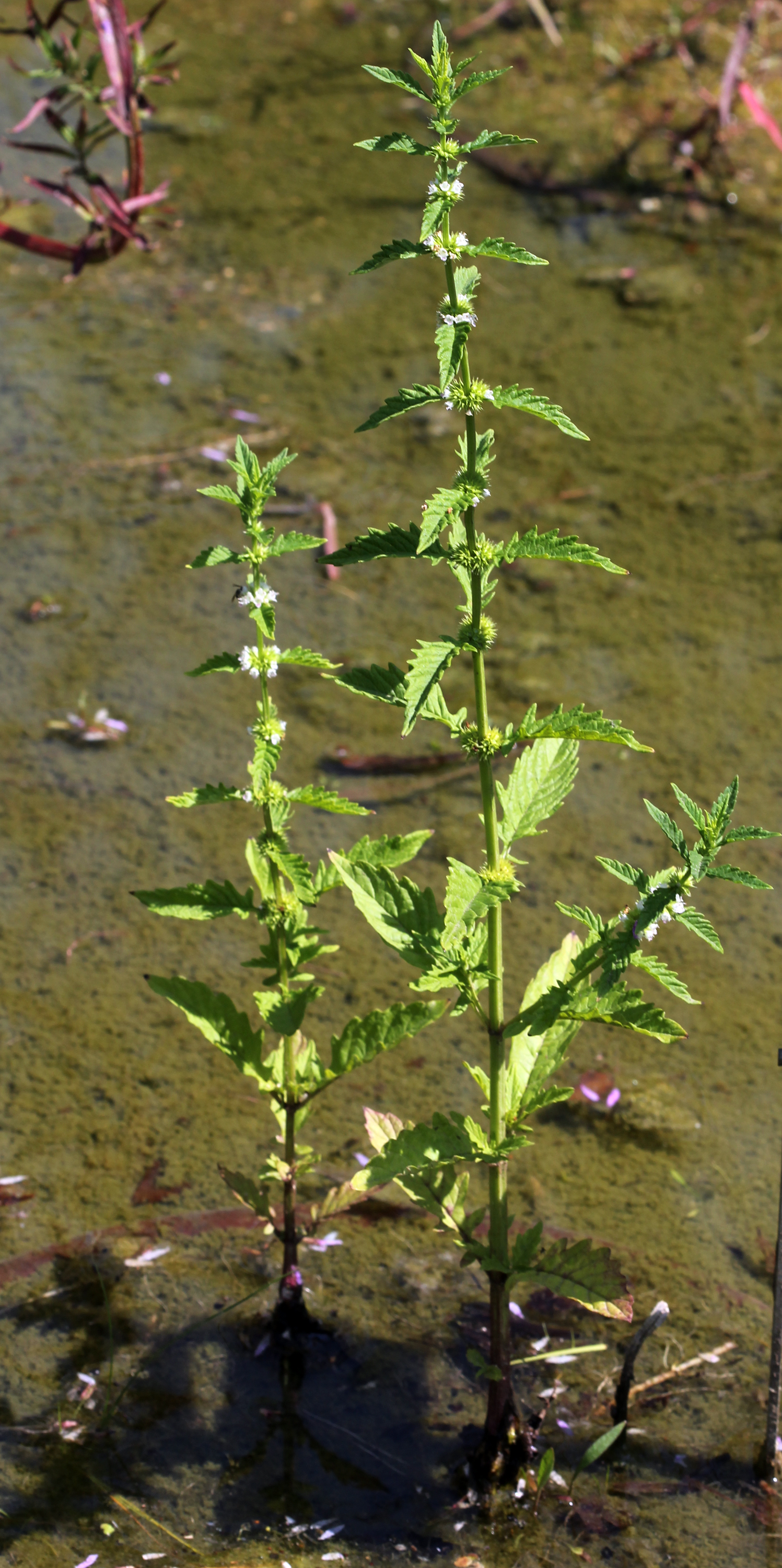
Lycopus europeaus, Prague

== Description ==
Gypsywort is a rather straggly perennial plant with slender underground runners and grows to a height of about 20 to 80 cm (8 to 31 in). The stalkless or short-stalked leaves are in opposite pairs. The leaf blades are hairy, narrowly lanceolate-ovate, sometimes pinnately-lobed, and with large teeth on the margin. The inflorescence forms a terminal spike and is composed of dense whorls of white or pale pink flowers. The calyx has five lobes and the corolla forms a two-lipped flower about 4 mm (0.16 in) long with a fused tube. The upper lip of each flower is slightly convex with a notched tip and the lower lip is three-lobed, the central lobe being the largest and bearing a red "nectar mark" to attract pollinating insects. There are two stamens, the gynoecium has two fused carpels and the fruit is a four-chambered schizocarp. The flowers are visited by many types of insects, and can be characterized by a generalized pollination syndrome.

== Habitat ==
Gypsywort grows primarily in wetland areas. It grows along the borders of lakes, ponds and streams as well as in canals and marshes. Its carpels float which may aid dispersal of the plant and its rhizomeous roots also allow the plant to spread. It is in flower from June to September, and produces seeds from August to October.

== Etymology and folklore ==
It is reputed to have medicinal qualities and has been used by various peoples as a dye, astringent, cosmetic, douche and narcotic. Several research studies have been undertaken on the properties of this plant.

Rembert Dodoens wrote of the names of the plant in the 1578 English translation of his original book published in 1563, as the fourth among the group of horehounds “…: in Brabant water Andoren, and of some Egyptenaers cruyt, that is to say, the Egyptians herbe, bycause of the Rogues and runnegates which call themselves Egyptians, do colour themselves blacke with this herbe.” The Brabant original seems to suggest it was used by itinerant non-Roma who were pretending to be Romani people by darkening their skin. He also wrote that water horehound was not used in medicine. Through time it often came to be said that name gypsywort comes from the belief that Romani people would stain their skin with the juice of the plant, although Howard (1987) states that they used it to dye their linen.
