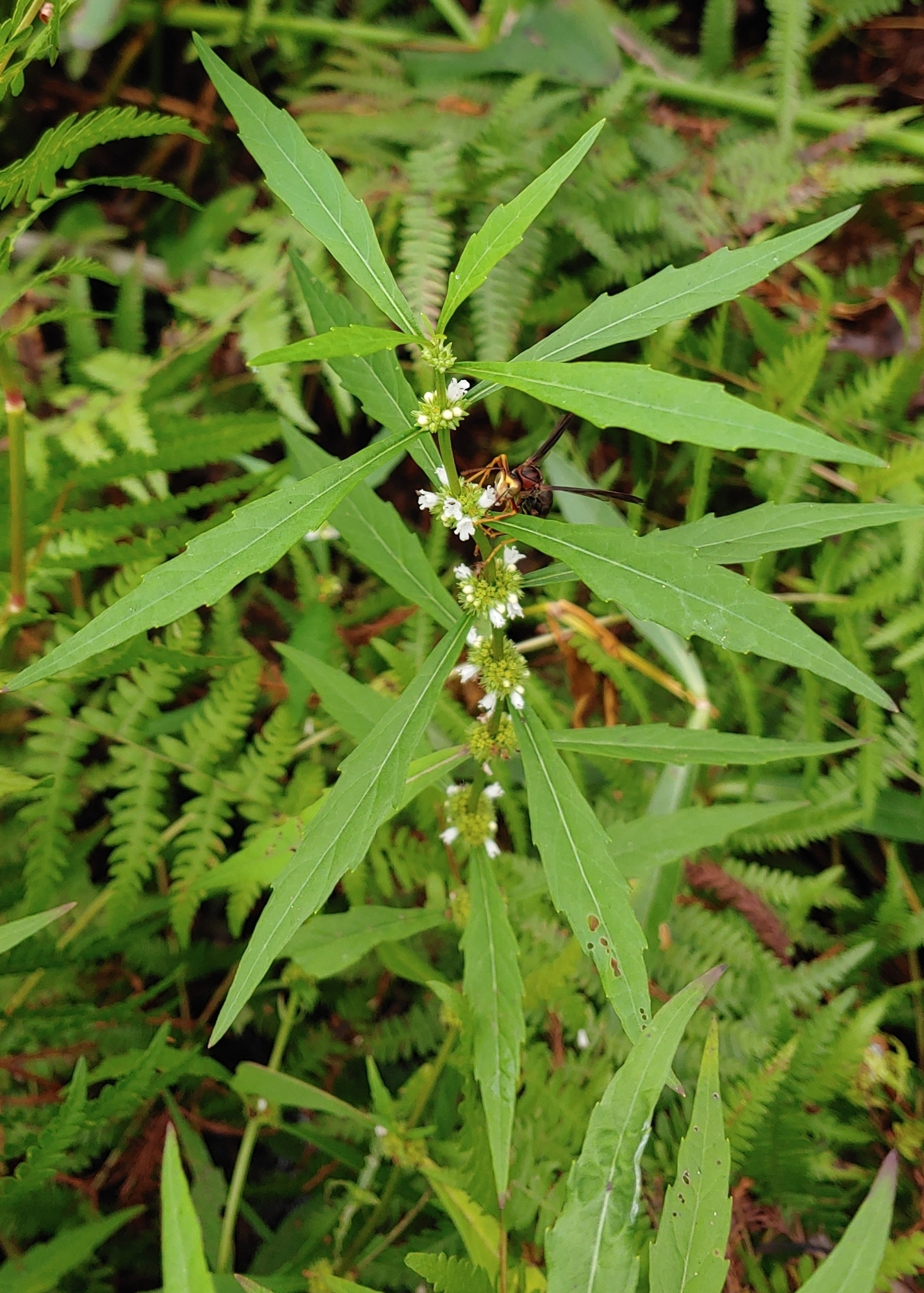

Scientific classification
- Kingdom: Plantae
- Clade: Tracheophytes
- Clade: Angiosperms
- Clade: Eudicots
- Clade: Asterids
- Order: Lamiales
- Family: Lamiaceae
- Genus: Lycopus
- Species: L. rubellus

Binomial name
- Lycopus rubellus Moench

= Lycopus rubellus =

Species of plant

Lycopus rubellus, commonly known as taperleaf water-horehound, is a species of flowering plant in the mint family (Lamiaceae). It is a perennial herb native to parts of the United States, where it occurs in wetland and riparian habitats.

== Taxonomy ==
Lycopus rubellus was described by Conrad Moench and is accepted as a distinct species in modern taxonomic treatments.

== Description ==
Lycopus rubellus is a perennial herbaceous plant typical of the genus Lycopus, with opposite leaves and small flowers produced in clusters in the leaf axils. As a member of the mint family, it shares characteristics common to other Lamiaceae, including square stems and bilaterally symmetrical flowers.
