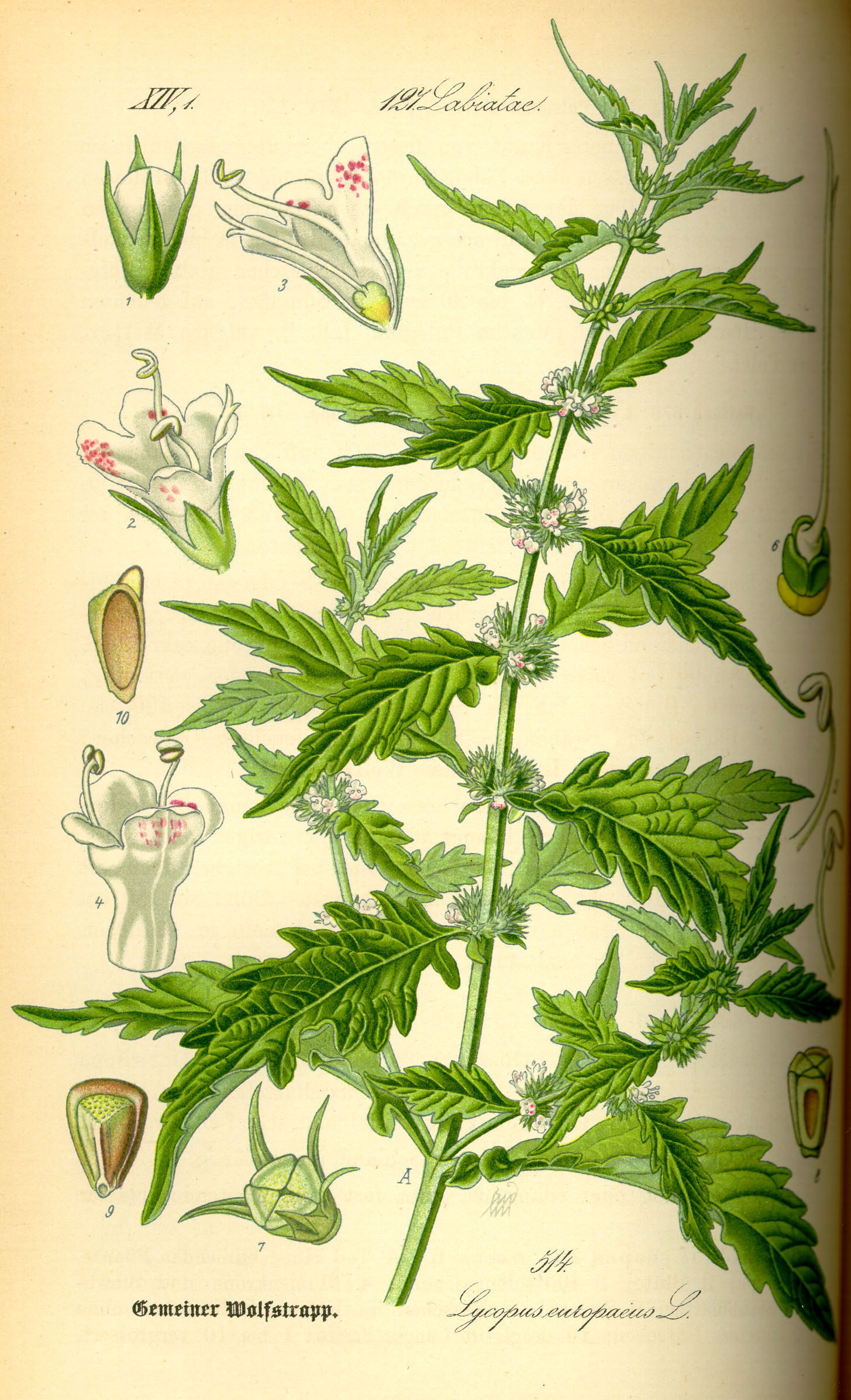
- Lycopus europaeus

Scientific classification
- Kingdom: Plantae
- Clade: Embryophytes
- Clade: Tracheophytes
- Clade: Spermatophytes
- Clade: Angiosperms
- Clade: Eudicots
- Clade: Asterids
- Order: Lamiales
- Family: Lamiaceae
- Subfamily: Nepetoideae
- Tribe: Mentheae
- Genus: Lycopus; L.

Synonyms
- Phytosalpinx Lunell; Euhemus Raf.

= Lycopus =

Genus of flowering plants

Lycopus is a genus of herbaceous plants in the family Lamiaceae. The many species are known as water horehound, gypsywort, and bugleweed and are native to Europe, Asia, Australia, and North America. The species are most often found in wetlands, damp meadows, and stream banks. Some of the wetland species have become endangered.

== Description ==
The genus includes only perennial species. They spread by both seeds and stems rooting as they grow along the ground. Small white flowers bloom in late summer on leaf axils. Leaves are bright green, pointed, lobed, and like all mints occur in opposite pairs. Some species start with curled purple leaves that unfurl to a bright green coloration. The species in this genus vary in size, but generally grow to about 3–4 ft (91–122 cm).

== Taxonomy ==
=== Fossil record ===
Fossil seeds of †Lycopus antiquus are known from the Middle Miocene strata of southern Russia, from the Miocene of Lower Lusatia, Germany, and from the Late Miocene strata of western Siberia and Ukraine. Lycopus antiquus has possibly been applied to more than one extinct species which were widely distributed in Europe and Siberia from the Miocene to the Pliocene. Extant Lycopus species whose fruits most resemble L. antiquus, are the East Asian Lycopus lucidus and the Eurasian Lycopus exaltatus.

=== Species ===
- Lycopus alissoviae Prob. – Primorye region of Russia
- Lycopus americanus Muhl. ex W.P.C.Barton – American bugleweed - widespread across most of United States and Canada
- Lycopus amplectens Raf. – eastern United States
- Lycopus angustifolius Elliott – southeastern United States
- Lycopus asper Greene – rough bugleweed - western Canada, western + central United States
- Lycopus australis R.Br. – Australian Gypsywort - Australia
- Lycopus cavaleriei H.Lév. – Korean bugleweed - China, Japan, Korea, Sakhalin, Kuril Islands
- Lycopus charkeviczii Prob. – Primorye region of Russia
- Lycopus cokeri H.E.Ahles ex Sorrie – North Carolina, South Carolina
- Lycopus europaeus L. – Gypsywort - Europe, North Africa, northern Asia; naturalized in New Zealand and North America
- Lycopus exaltatus L.f. – central + eastern Europe, Siberia, Central Asia, Xinjiang, Caucasus, Western Himalayas
- Lycopus hirtellus Kom. – Primorye region of Russia
- Lycopus × intermedius Hausskn. – Germany, Austria, Czech Republic, Greece (L. europaeus × L. exaltatus)
- Lycopus kurilensis Prob. – Kuril Islands
- Lycopus laurentianus Roll.-Germ. – Quebec
- Lycopus lucidus Turcz. ex Benth. – Traditional Chinese Medicine herb to make Lycopi rhizoma - China, Japan, Korea, Siberia, Russian Far East
- Lycopus rubellus Moench – central + eastern United States
- Lycopus × sherardii Steele – Quebec, Ontario, eastern United States
- Lycopus sichotensis Prob. – Primorye region of Russia
- Lycopus uniflorus Michx. – northern bugleweed - Canada, United States. China, Japan, Korea, Russian Far East
- Lycopus virginicus L. – Virginia bugleweed/water-horehound - central + eastern United States

== Uses ==
The plant's juice yields black dye, supposedly used by the Roma in Europe to tan their skin to mimic Egyptians, hence the common name of Gypsywort for Lycopus europaeus. Apothecaries and herbalists used the leaves, stems, and flowers for their astringent and sedative qualities as well as for anxiety, tuberculosis, and palpitations.
