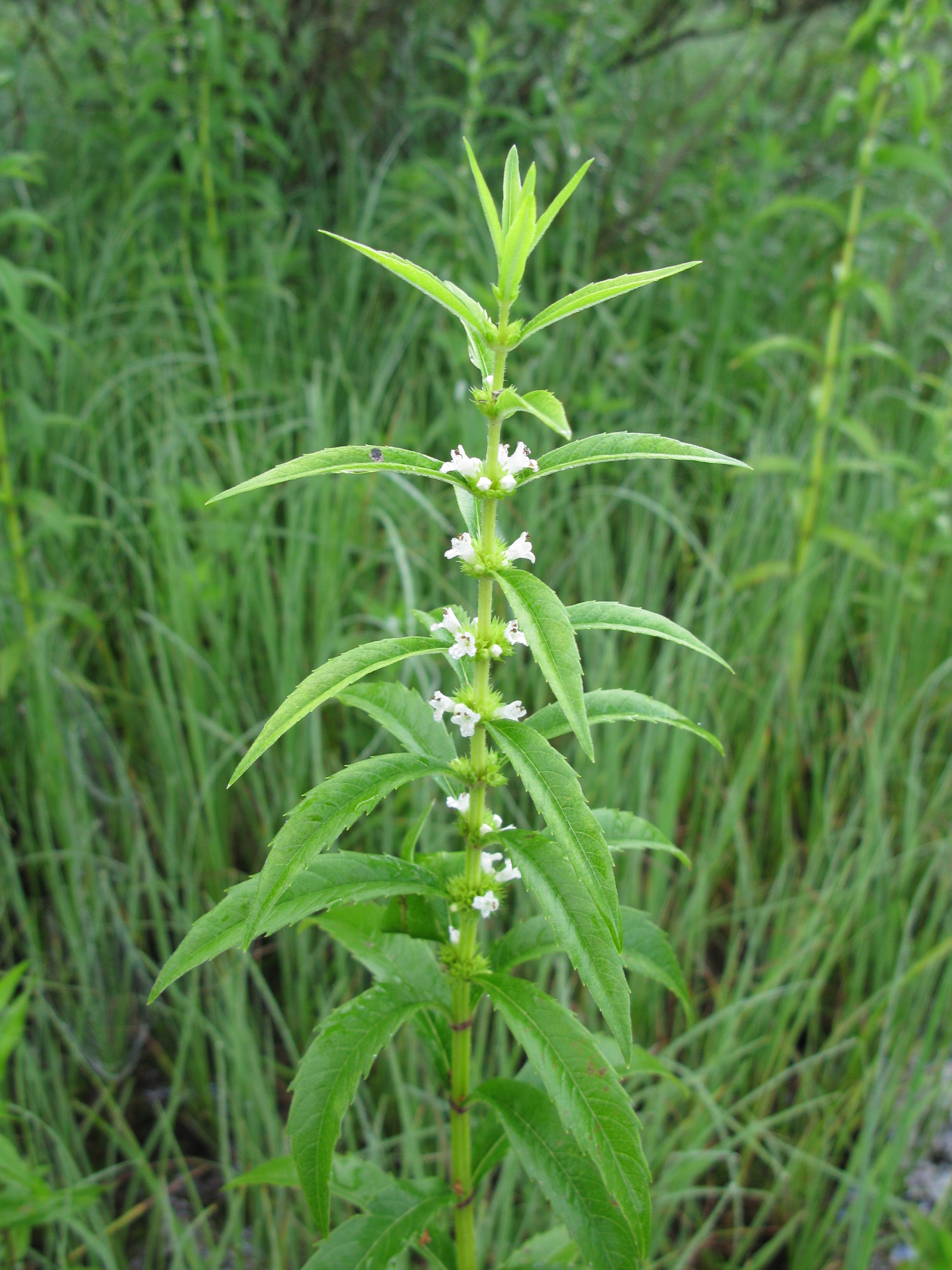

Scientific classification
- Kingdom: Plantae
- Clade: Tracheophytes
- Clade: Angiosperms
- Clade: Eudicots
- Clade: Asterids
- Order: Lamiales
- Family: Lamiaceae
- Genus: Lycopus
- Species: L. lucidus

Binomial name
- Lycopus lucidus Turcz. ex Benth.

= Lycopus lucidus =

Species of plant

Lycopus lucidus is a species of plant in the family Lamiaceae. The aerial parts (澤蘭, 泽兰 zélán) and the dried rhizomes (地筍, 地笋 dìsǔn) are used in traditional Chinese medicine, have a reputation for promoting blood circulation and energy (qi), and preventing water retention. They are said to have a "warming" property, and have a mild bittersweet flavor.

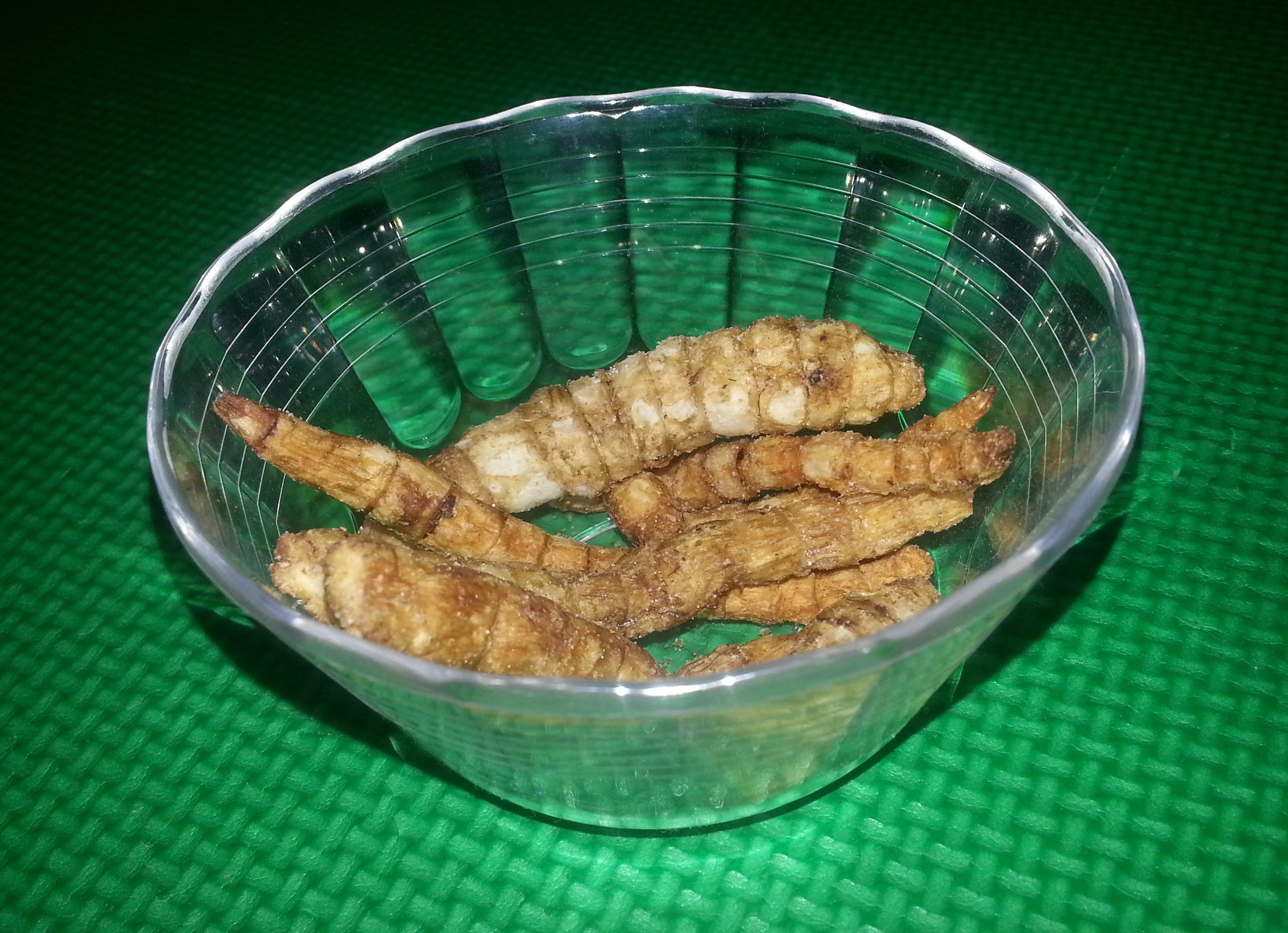
Bowl of deep fried Lycopus lucidus rhizomes
