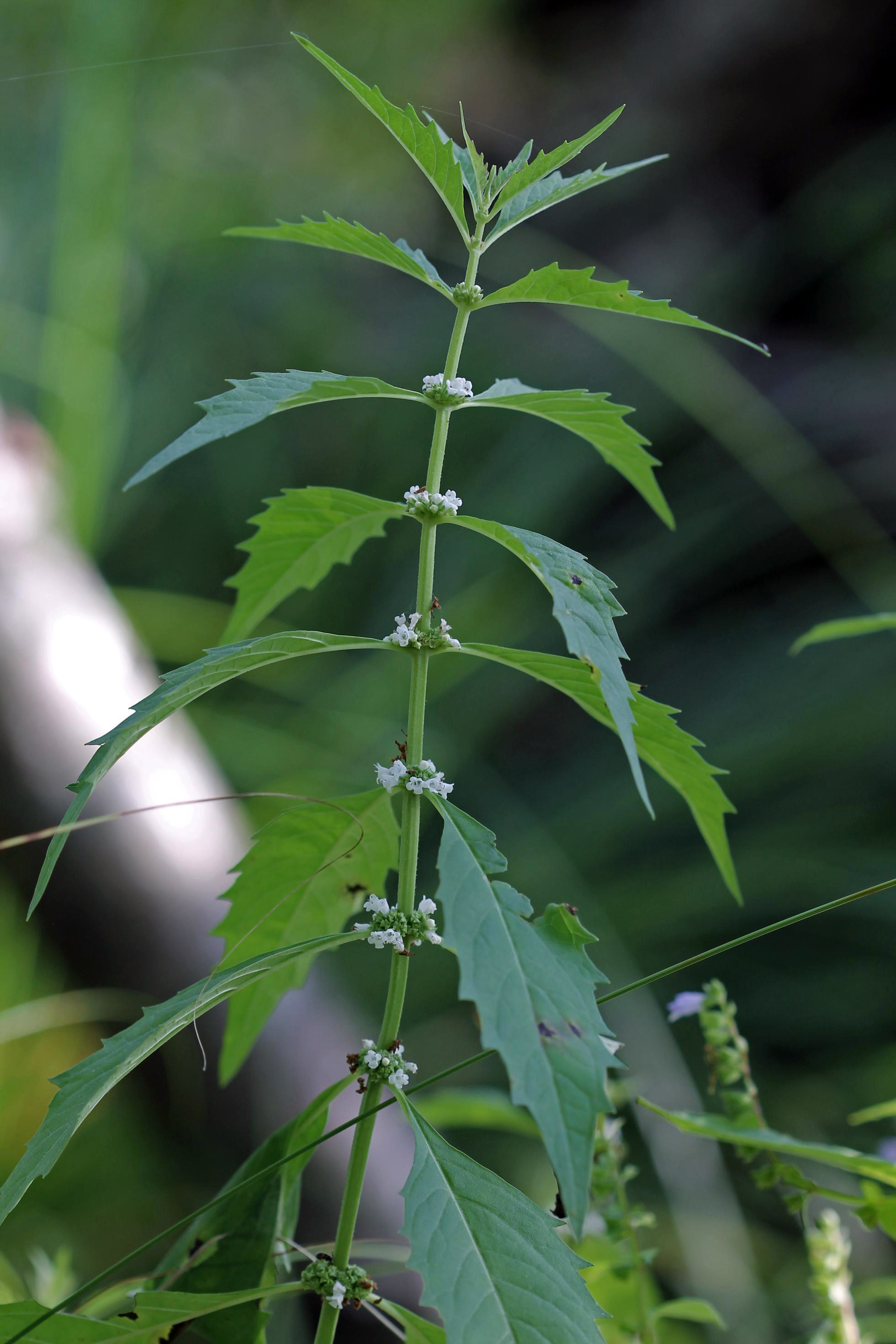

Conservation status
- Secure (NatureServe)

Scientific classification
- Kingdom: Plantae
- Clade: Tracheophytes
- Clade: Angiosperms
- Clade: Eudicots
- Clade: Asterids
- Order: Lamiales
- Family: Lamiaceae
- Genus: Lycopus
- Species: L. uniflorus

Binomial name
- Lycopus uniflorus Michx.

Synonyms
- List: Euhemus uniflorus (Michx.) Raf.; Lycopus communis E.P.Bicknell; Lycopus coreanus H.Lév.; Lycopus membranaceus E.P.Bicknell; Lycopus parviflorus (Benth.) Maxim.; Lycopus pumilus Vahl

= Lycopus uniflorus =

Plant species in the mint family

Lycopus uniflorus is a species of flowering plant in the mint family known by the common name northern bugleweed. It is native to much of North America (Canada, United States) and east Asia (China, Japan, Korea, Russian Far East)

Lycopus uniflorus can be found most often in moist areas, such as marshes. This is a perennial herb growing from a slender rhizome with thickened, tuberlike tips. The plant grows upright 10 to 50 centimeters tall. Its stem is lined with pairs of toothed leaves with heads of flowers in their axils. The flower is white and a few millimeters in length.

The root of the plant was used as a food by several Native American groups. The tubers can be peeled and eaten raw, or pickled.
