= Lhasa North and South Mountain Greening Project =

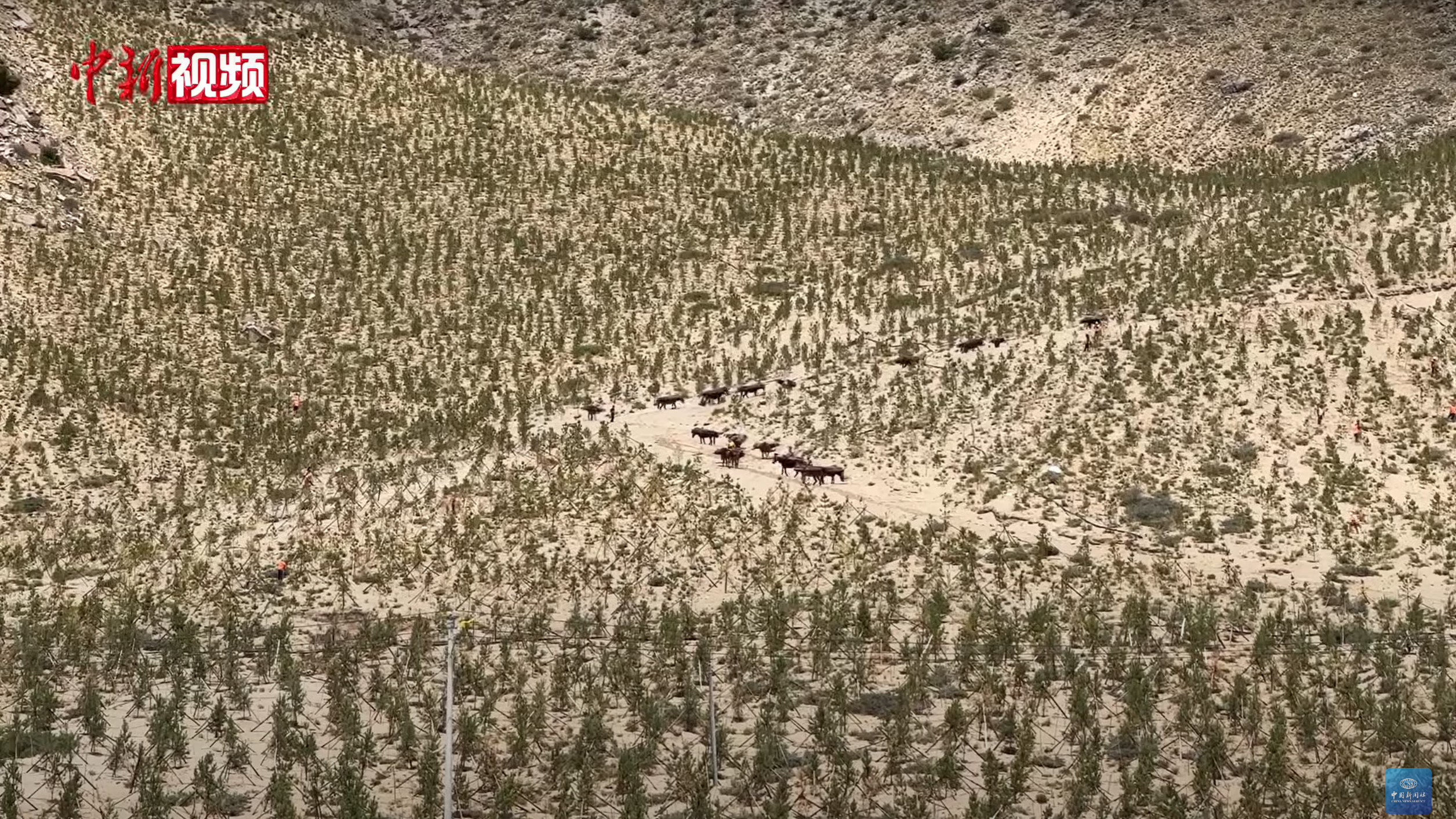
Lhasa North and South Mountain Greening Project in June 2024

The Lhasa North and South Mountain Greening Project (Chinese: 拉萨南北山绿化工程) is the first large-scale mountain afforestation ecological restoration project in Tibet.

== History ==
The project is planned to take 10 years to complete the greening of an area of 2,067,200 Mu (~1,378 km²) of land, striving to make Lhasa an ecologically pleasant and livable capital city of the plateau. The project stretches nearly 200 kilometers, involving Lhasa City, Liuwu, Doilungdêqên, Dagzê, Qüxü, Maizhokunggar, Lhünzhub and Shannan, Nagarzê, Gonggar and other 9 counties (districts) and 35 townships. In 2022, Tibet officially issued the Overall Plan for the Greening Project of Lhasa's North and South Mountains (2021-2030). The project planning period is 10 years (2021-2030), divided into two phases of implementation. The 2021-2025 for the near future, plans to complete the creation of 959,100 Mu (~639 km²) of forests; the 2026-2030 for the long term, plans to complete the creation of 1,108,100 Mu (~738 km²) of forests. In June 2024, nearly 400,000 (266 km²) Mu of forestation had been completed in Tibet.
