= Aloin =

Chemical compound

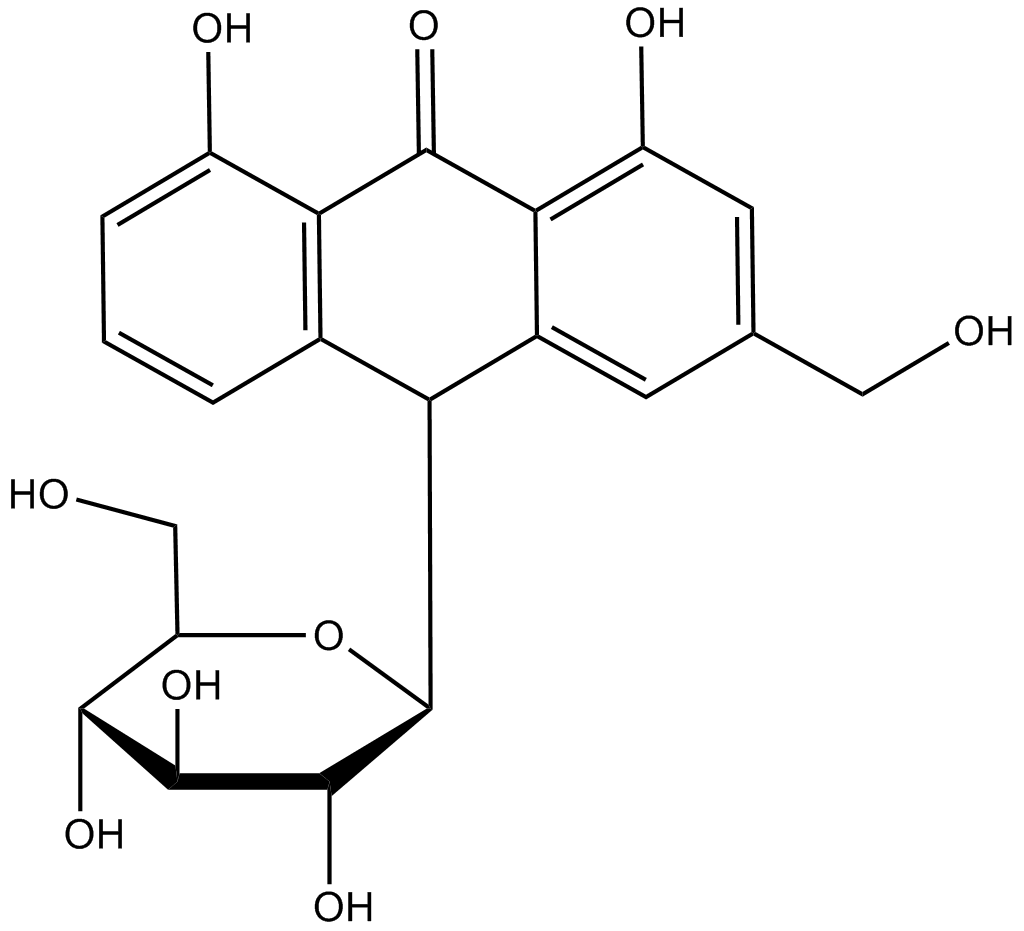

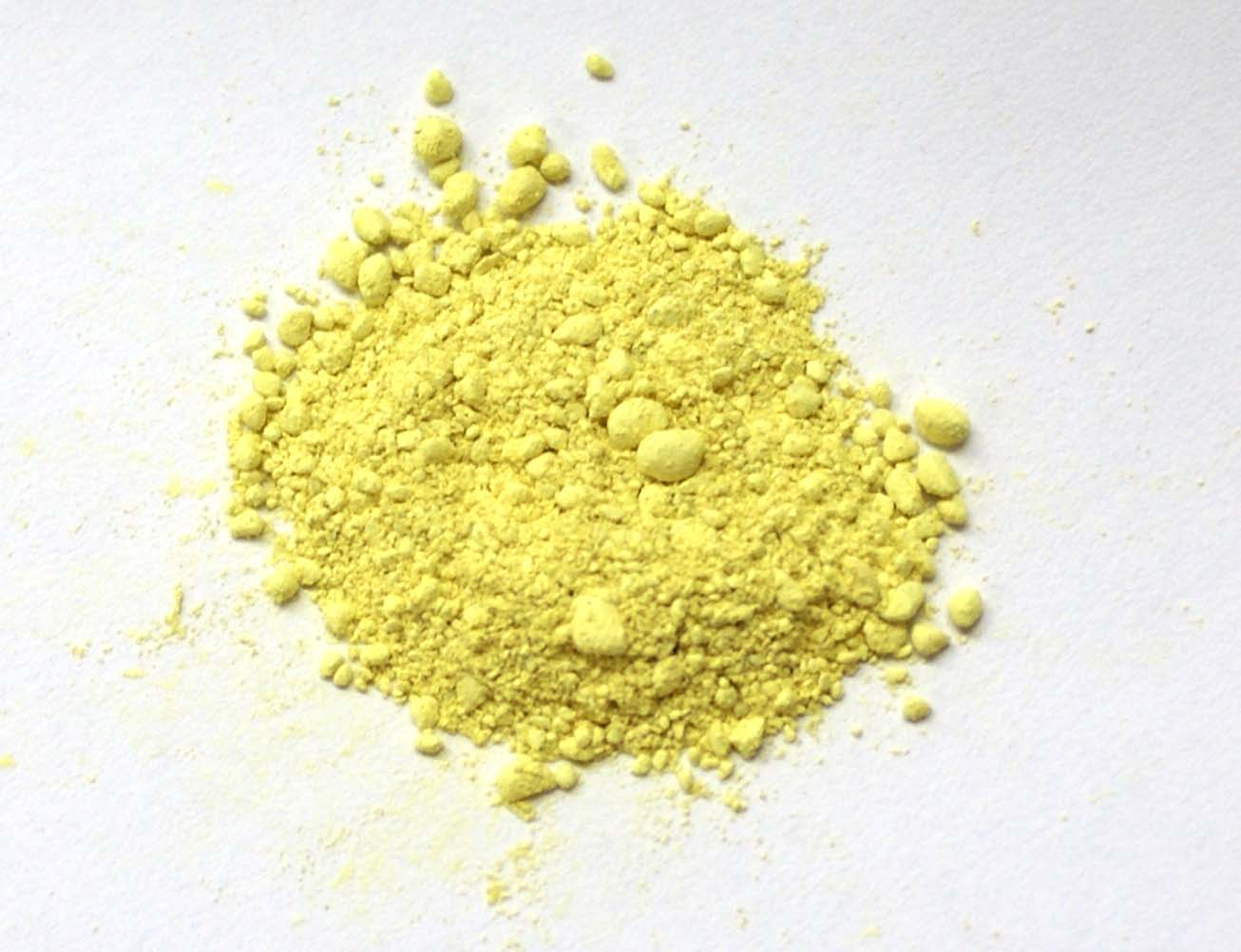

Clinical data
- Routes of administration: Oral
- ATC code: none

Identifiers
- IUPAC name: Aloin A: (10S)-10-Glucopyranosyl-1,8-dihydroxy-3-(hydroxymethyl)-9(10H)-anthracenone
- CAS Number: 8015-61-0
- PubChem CID: 313325
- IUPHAR/BPS: 12498
- DrugBank: DB15477
- ChemSpider: 24534069
- UNII: W41H6S09F4
- KEGG: C10305
- ChEBI: CHEBI:73222
- ChEMBL: ChEMBL497001
- CompTox Dashboard (EPA): DTXSID0045967
- ECHA InfoCard: 100.014.371

Chemical and physical data
- Formula: C_{21}H_{22}O_{9}
- Molar mass: 418.398 g·mol^{−1}
- 3D model (JSmol): Interactive image
- Melting point: 148 °C (298 °F) (70–80 °C for monohydrate)
- SMILES: c1cc2c(c(c1)O)C(=O)c3c(cc(cc3O)CO)[C@H]2[C@H]4[C@@H]([C@H]([C@@H]([C@H](O4)CO)O)O)O
- InChI: InChI=1S/C21H22O9/c22-6-8-4-10-14(21-20(29)19(28)17(26)13(7-23)30-21)9-2-1-3-11(24)15(9)18(27)16(10)12(25)5-8/h1-5,13-14,17,19-26,28-29H,6-7H2/t13-,14+,17-,19+,20-,21+/m1/s1; Key:AFHJQYHRLPMKHU-OSYMLPPYSA-N

Aloin, also known as barbaloin, is a bitter, yellow-brown colored compound noted in the exudate of at least 68 Aloe species at levels from 0.1 to 6.6% of leaf dry weight (making between 3% and 35% of the total exudate), and in another 17 species at indeterminate levels [Reynolds, 1995b]. It is used as a stimulant-laxative, treating constipation by inducing bowel movements. The compound is present in what is commonly referred to as the aloe latex that exudes from cells adjacent to the vascular bundles, found under the rind of the leaf and in between it and the gel.

When dried, it has been used as a bittering agent in commerce (alcoholic beverages) [21 CFR 172.510. Scientific names given include Aloe perryi, A. barbadensis (= A. vera), A. ferox, and hybrids of A. ferox with A. africana and A. spicata.]. Aloe is listed in federal regulations as a natural substance that may be "safely used in food" when used "in the minimum quantity required to produce their intended physical or technical effect and in accordance with all the principles of good manufacturing practice." This food application is generally limited to use in quite small quantities as a flavoring in alcoholic beverages and may usually be identified only as a "natural flavor".

In May 2002, the U.S. Food and Drug Administration (FDA) issued a ruling that aloe laxatives are no longer generally recognized as safe (GRAS) and effective, meaning that aloin-containing products are no longer available in over-the-counter drug products in the United States, because they may be carcinogenic and more data is needed to establish otherwise. Aloe vera leaf latex is a concentrate of an herb or other botanical, and so meets the statutory description of an ingredient that may be used in dietary supplements.

== Structure and preparation ==
Aloin extracted from natural sources is a mixture of two diastereomers, termed aloin A (also called barbaloin) and aloin B (or isobarbaloin), which have similar chemical properties. Aloin is an anthraquinone glycosyl, meaning that its anthraquinone skeleton has been modified by the addition of a sugar molecule. Anthraquinones are a common family of naturally occurring yellow, orange, and red pigments of which many have cathartic properties, attributes shared by aloin. Aloin is related to aloe emodin, which lacks a sugar group but shares aloin's biological properties.

Aloin is usually prepared by extraction from aloe latex (the term "Cape aloe" also refers to the dried latex of the leaves of several species of the genus Aloe, especially A. ferox [Blumenthal, 1998]), the bitter yellow exudate that seeps out from just underneath the skin of aloe leaves. The latex is then dried and powdered to make the final product, often made into tablets or a beverage, though aloin does not have good stability in aqueous solutions. Products derived from the gel of the aloe plant do not contain appreciable amounts of aloin, and have not been proven effective for any disease or condition when taken orally.

== Effects ==
Once ingested, aloin increases peristaltic contractions in the colon, which induces bowel movements. Aloin also prevents the colon from re-absorbing water from the gastrointestinal tract, which leads to softer stools. This effect is caused by aloin's opening of chloride channels of the colonic membrane. In higher doses, these effects may lead to electrolyte imbalance, diarrhea, and abdominal pain, which are common side-effects of the drug. Because aloin can potentially cause uterine contractions, pregnant women should avoid ingesting aloe products containing aloin in more than trace amounts.

In a study on consumption of aloe in rats and tilapia (with no separation of gel from aloin), significant negative health effects were found, including normocytic normochromic anaemia (low red blood cell count, but normal cells), hypoproteinaemia, and high AST levels. As many studies involving aloe gel (without aloin) have not observed these negative effects, it is possible that the negative effects could in large part be due to aloin.

== Legal status ==
Plant-derived remedies containing aloin and other anthraquinones have been used as traditional medicines since antiquity, but harsh side effects make these substances generally unsuitable for household or daily use. In 2002, the US FDA mandated that manufacturers reformulate or stop manufacturing over-the-counter products containing aloe because the agency did not receive necessary safety data. The substance is still allowed in dietary supplements [21 U.S.C. 321 (ff)(1)] and is allowed for use in foods (primarily alcoholic beverages).
