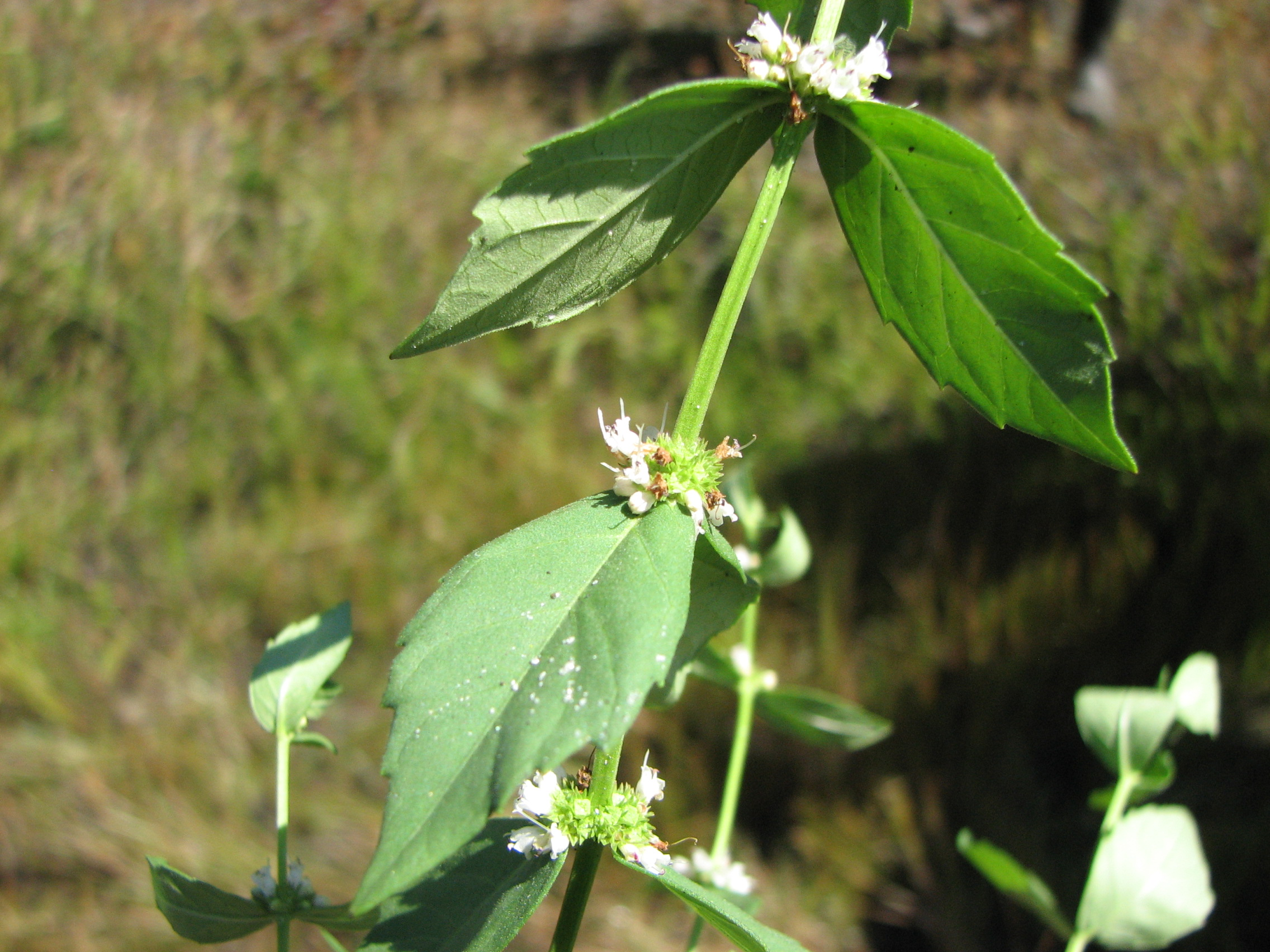

Scientific classification
- Kingdom: Plantae
- Clade: Tracheophytes
- Clade: Angiosperms
- Clade: Eudicots
- Clade: Asterids
- Order: Lamiales
- Family: Lamiaceae
- Genus: Lycopus
- Species: L. amplectens

Binomial name
- Lycopus amplectens Raf.

= Lycopus amplectens =

Species of flowering plant

Lycopus amplectens, common names clasping-leaved water-horehound, sessile-leaved bugleweed, and sessile-leaved water-horehound, is a species of Lycopus native to North America. Its native range stretches from Massachusetts south to northeastern Florida.

== Conservation status in the United States ==
It is listed as endangered in Indiana and Maryland. It is listed as a special concern in Connecticut.
