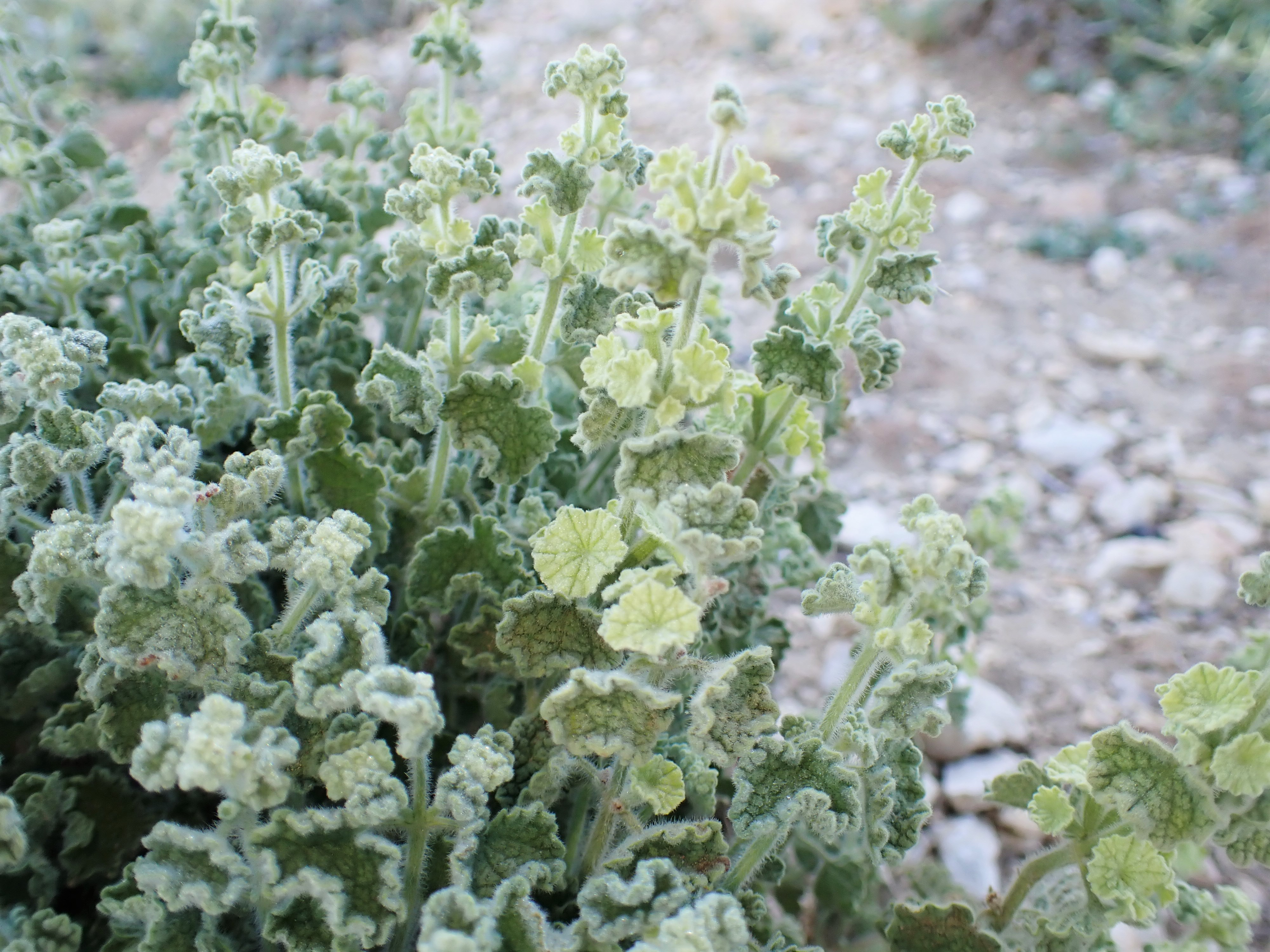

Scientific classification
- Kingdom: Plantae
- Clade: Tracheophytes
- Clade: Angiosperms
- Clade: Eudicots
- Clade: Asterids
- Order: Lamiales
- Family: Lamiaceae
- Genus: Pseudodictamnus
- Species: P. undulatus

Binomial name
- Pseudodictamnus undulatus (Benth.) Salmaki & Siadati

Synonyms
- Ballota undulata (Sieber ex Fresen.) Benth.; Marrubium crispum Sieber ex Boiss.; Marrubium undulatum Sieber ex Fresen.

= Pseudodictamnus undulatus =

Species of flowering plant in the sage family

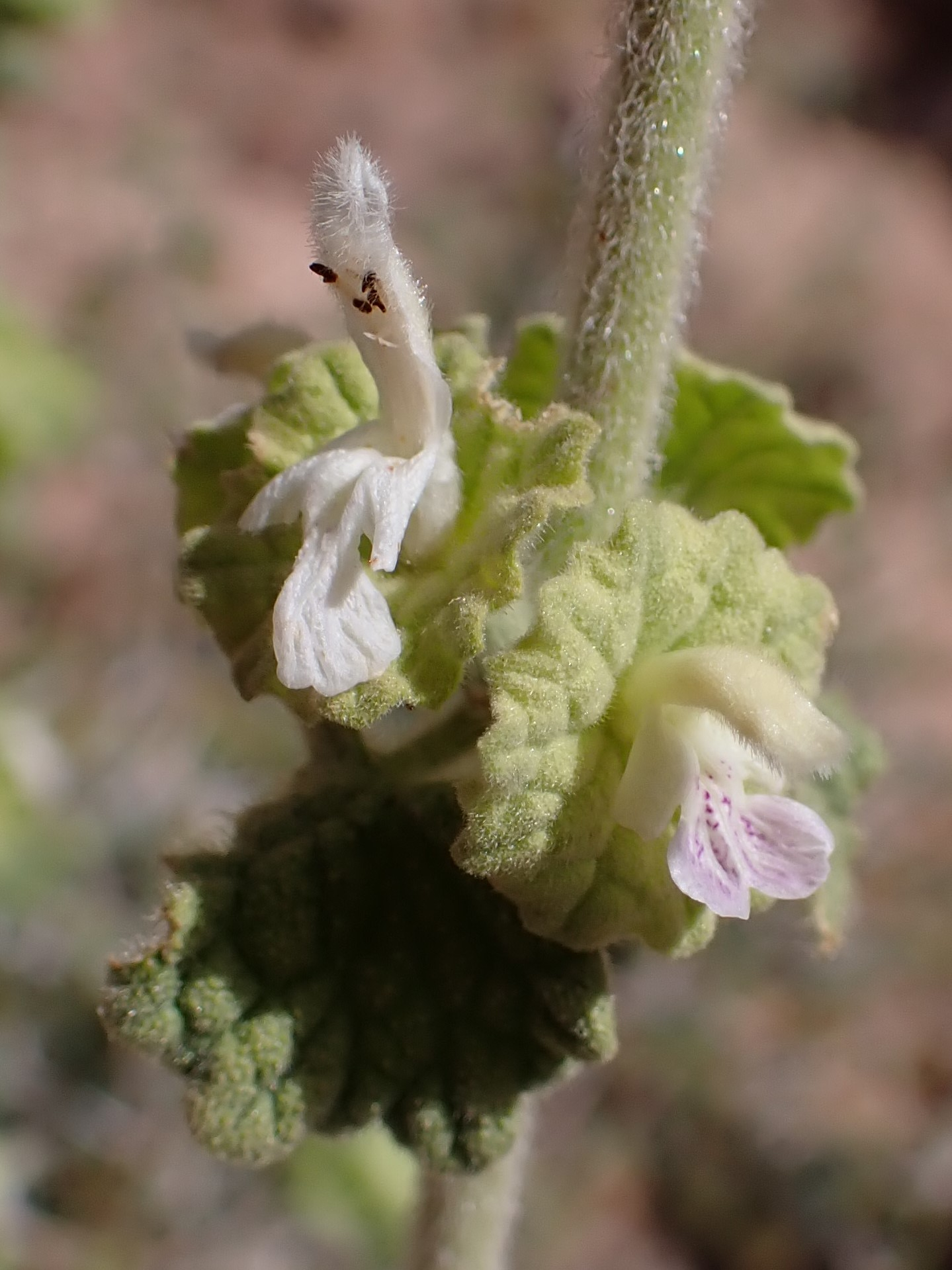
Pseudodictamnus undulatus flower close-up

Pseudodictamnus undulatus, commonly known as common ballota or horehound, is a species of flowering plant in the family Lamiaceae, native to the Mediterranean region including Egypt, Israel and Jordan. It is a compact, evergreen subshrub with a woody base, many hairy wiry stems, simple opposite leaves with toothed margins, and whorls of white flowers with funnel-shaped calyxes.

It is a plant of semi-arid, acidic stony habitats and in Israel often grows in association with Echinops gaillardotii, Carlina corymbosa and Ziziphus lotus.
