= Barbalin, Western Australia =

Barbalin
- Town
- Interactive map of Barbalin
- Coordinates: 30.885°S 118.114°E
- Country: Australia
- State: Western Australia
- LGA: Shire of Mukinbudin

Government
  - State electorate: Central Wheatbelt
  - Federal division: Durack

Area
  - Total: 165.3 km^{2} (63.8 sq mi)

Population
  - Total: 17 (SAL 2021)
- Postcode: 6479

Barbalin is a town situated in the Shire of Mukinbudin in Western Australia.

It is located approximately 245 km from Perth and covers an area of 165,342 km^{2}. It has a recorded population of 24.

Barbalin was a siding on the Wyalkatchem to Southern Cross railway line.

Barbalin's postcode is 6479.

The town's water scheme has been of concern and interest at different stages.
