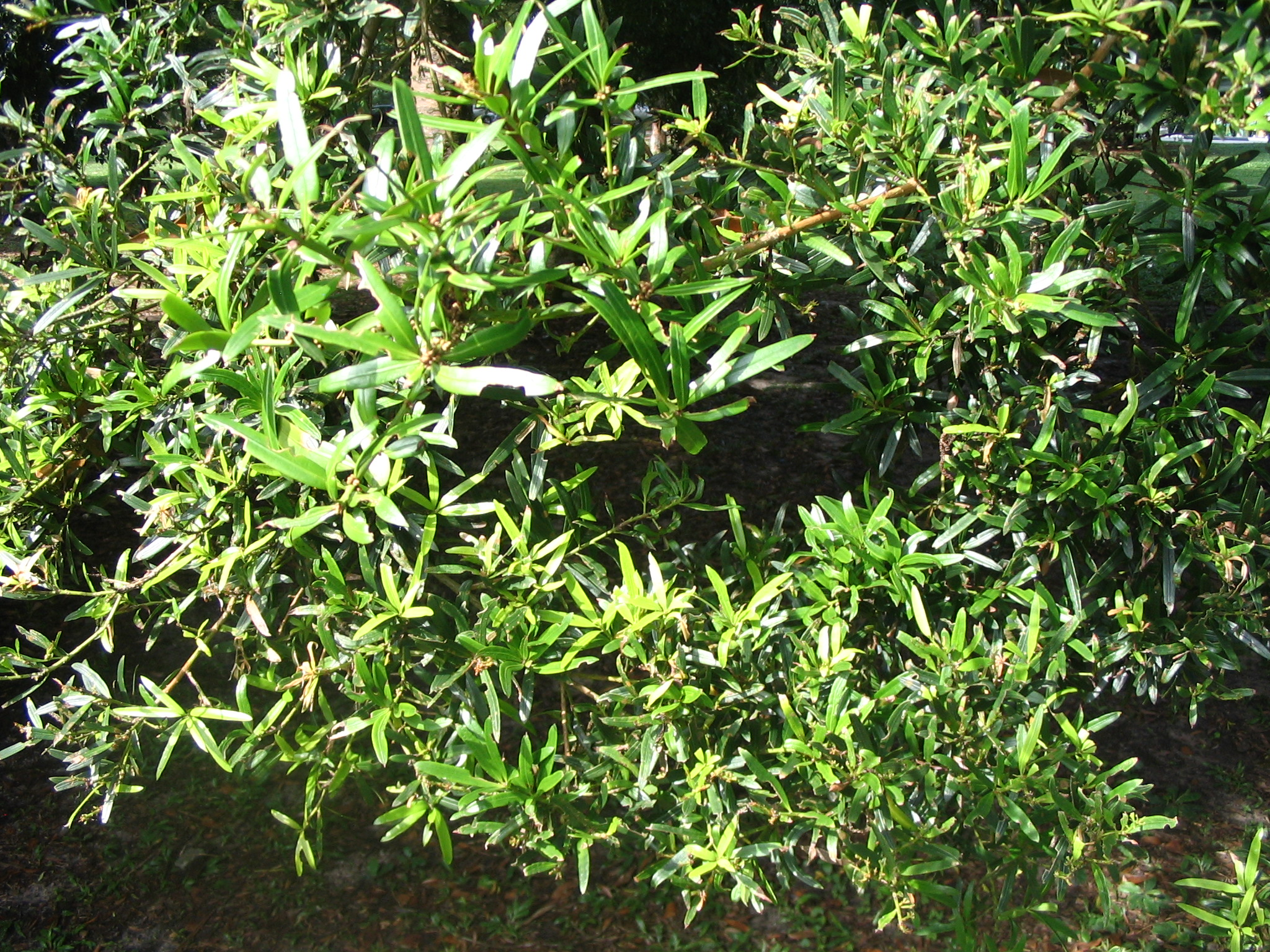

Conservation status
- Vulnerable (IUCN 3.1)

Scientific classification
- Kingdom: Plantae
- Clade: Tracheophytes
- Clade: Gymnosperms
- Division: Pinophyta
- Class: Pinopsida
- Order: Araucariales
- Family: Podocarpaceae
- Genus: Podocarpus
- Species: P. polystachyus

Binomial name
- Podocarpus polystachyus R.Br. ex Endl., 1847

= Podocarpus polystachyus =

Species of conifer

Podocarpus polystachyus, the sea teak, is a species of conifer in the family Podocarpaceae. It is found in the tropical coasts of Malay Peninsula, and the islands of Singapore, Lingga, Sumatra, Borneo, Sulawesi, the Maluku, the Philippines and New Guinea; it grows in areas of the high tide mark of sandy beaches and coastal cliffs, and mangrove swamps. Podocarpus polystachyus is arguably the closest any conifer comes to being a true mangrove species. It is highly adaptable and has a large range. It can be found in areas that are inundated twice a day by the tides.

== Description ==
This tree species can grow up to 20m tall. Its growth is irregular and stunted when near coastlines, while its usually conical in trees far from the coastline. Its alternate, short-stalk leaves has leathery leafy blades that are narrow lance-shaped, dark green, and is 0.5-1.3 cm-sized.
