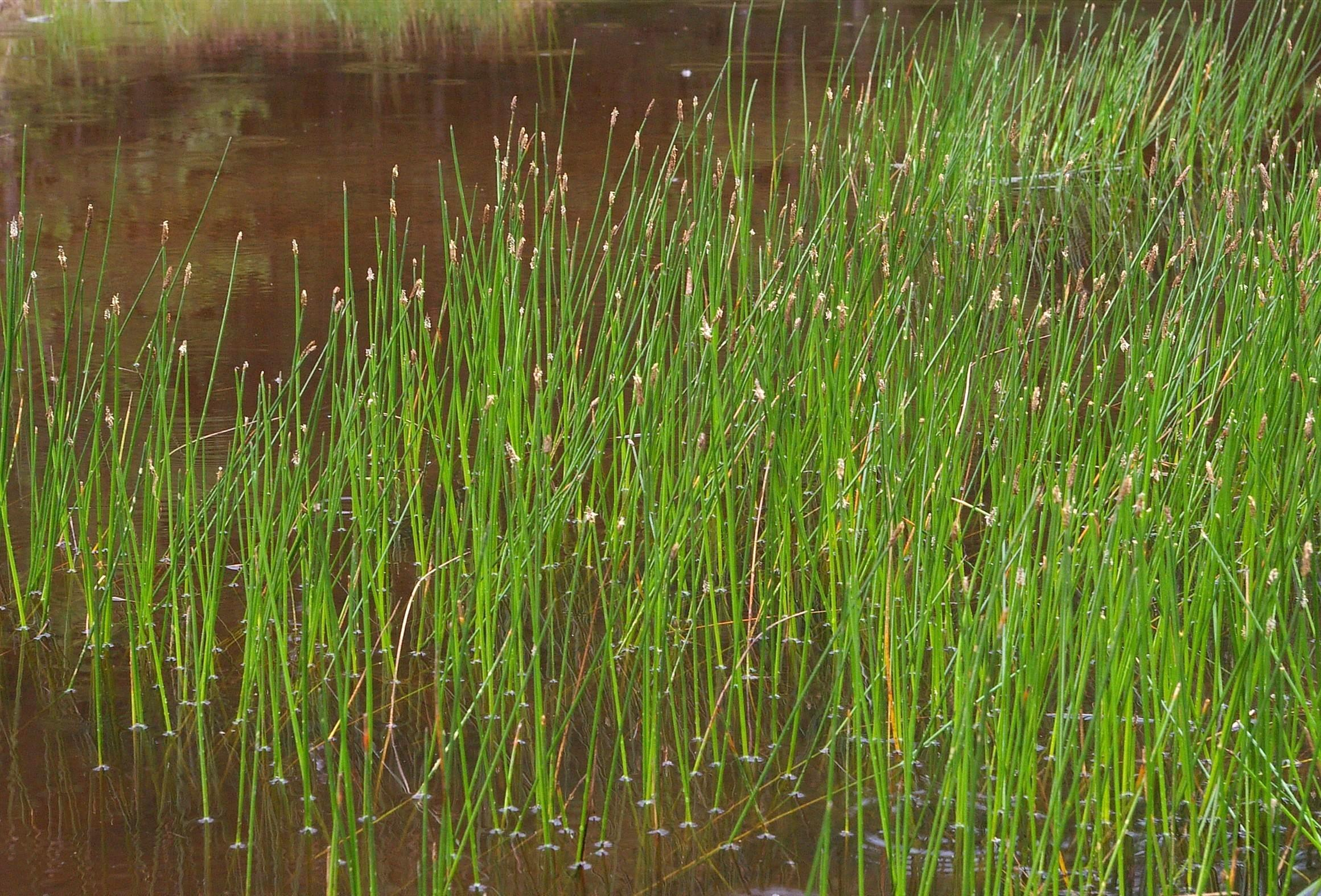

Conservation status
- Least Concern (IUCN 3.1)

Scientific classification
- Kingdom: Plantae
- Clade: Tracheophytes
- Clade: Angiosperms
- Clade: Monocots
- Clade: Commelinids
- Order: Poales
- Family: Cyperaceae
- Genus: Eleocharis
- Species: E. palustris

Binomial name
- Eleocharis palustris (L.) Roem. & Schult.

Synonyms
- List: Bulbostylis palustris (L.) Steven; Chlorocharis palustris (L.) Rikli; Clavula palustris (L.) Dumort.; Cyperus paluster Missbach & E.H.L.Krause; Cyperus paluster var. uniglumoides E.H.L.Krause; Cyperus palustris (L.) Sessé & Moc.; Eleocharis appendiculata Phil.; Eleocharis boissieri Podp.; Eleocharis ecarinata Zinserl.; Eleocharis filiculmis Schur; Eleocharis glaucescens (Willd.) Schult.; Eleocharis globularis Zinserl.; Eleocharis gracilis Hayek; Eleocharis haematolepis Steud.; Eleocharis intersita f. acetosa Tang & F.T.Wang ex Y.L.Chang; Eleocharis kasakstanica Zinserl.; Eleocharis kitamurana T.Koyama; Eleocharis levinae Zoz; Eleocharis limosa Drège; Eleocharis lindbergii (Strandh.) Tzvelev; Eleocharis minima f. major Boeckeler; Eleocharis minima var. mexicensis H.Pfeiff.; Eleocharis nebrodensis Parl.; Eleocharis oxystachys Sakalo; Eleocharis palustris var. degenerata Hook.; Eleocharis palustris subsp. globularis (Zinserl.) T.V.Egorova; Eleocharis palustris var. globularis (Zinserl.) A.E.Kozhevn.; Eleocharis palustris subsp. intersita (Zinserl.) Tzvelev; Eleocharis palustris var. kurilensis A.E.Kozhevn.; Eleocharis palustris var. lindbergii Strandh.; Eleocharis palustris subsp. lindbergii (Strandh.) Tzvelev; Eleocharis palustris var. major Sond.; Eleocharis palustris var. minor Hook.; Eleocharis palustris subsp. vigens (L.H.Bailey) A.Haines; Eleocharis palustris subsp. vulgaris Walters; Eleocharis palustromicrocarpa Á.Löve; Eleocharis quaesita Kitag.; Eleocharis smallii Britton; Eleocharis smallii var. major (Sond.) F.Seym.; Eleocharis striata Hochst. ex Engl.; Eleocharis vulgaris Á.Löve & D.Löve; Limnochloa capensis Nees; Megadenus palustris (L.) Raf.; Schoenus palustris (L.) Bernh.; Scirpus acicularis Oeder; Scirpus appendiculatus (Phil.) Kuntze; Scirpus baeothryon Schrad.; Scirpus bailii Kohts; Scirpus caespitosus Willd. ex Kunth; Scirpus campestris Willd. ex Kunth; Scirpus conicus C.Presl ex Mert. & W.D.J.Koch; Scirpus glaucescens Willd.; Scirpus intermedius Thuill.; Scirpus ovatus Gilib.; Scirpus palustris L.; Scirpus palustromicrocarpus (Á.Löve) Á.Löve; Scirpus reptans Thuill.; Scirpus tenuis Schreb. ex Schweigg. & Körte; Scirpus varius Schreb. ex Schweigg. & Körte; Trichophyllum palustre (L.) House; Trichophyllum palustre var. glaucescens (Willd.) House; Trichophyllum palustre var. vigens (L.H.Bailey) House

= Eleocharis palustris =

Species of grass-like plant

Eleocharis palustris, the common spike-rush, creeping spike-rush or marsh spike-rush, is a species of mat-forming perennial flowering plants in the sedge family Cyperaceae. It grows in wetlands in Europe, North Africa, northern and central Asia (Siberia, China, Mongolia, Iran, Nepal, etc.) and North America (United States, Canada, Greenland, northern Mexico). Eleocharis palustris is not easily distinguished from other closely related species and is extremely variable worldwide itself. The species epithet palustris is Latin for "of the marsh" and indicates its common habitat.

== Subspecies and varieties ==
Numerous names have been proposed for subspecies and varieties. The following are recognized:

1. Eleocharis palustris subsp. iranica Kukkonen - Egypt, Turkey, Iran, Iraq, Afghanistan, Pakistan
2. Eleocharis palustris subsp. palustris - most of species range
3. Eleocharis palustris var. vigens L.H.Bailey - North America
4. Eleocharis palustris subsp. waltersii Bureš & Danihelka - Europe and Cyprus

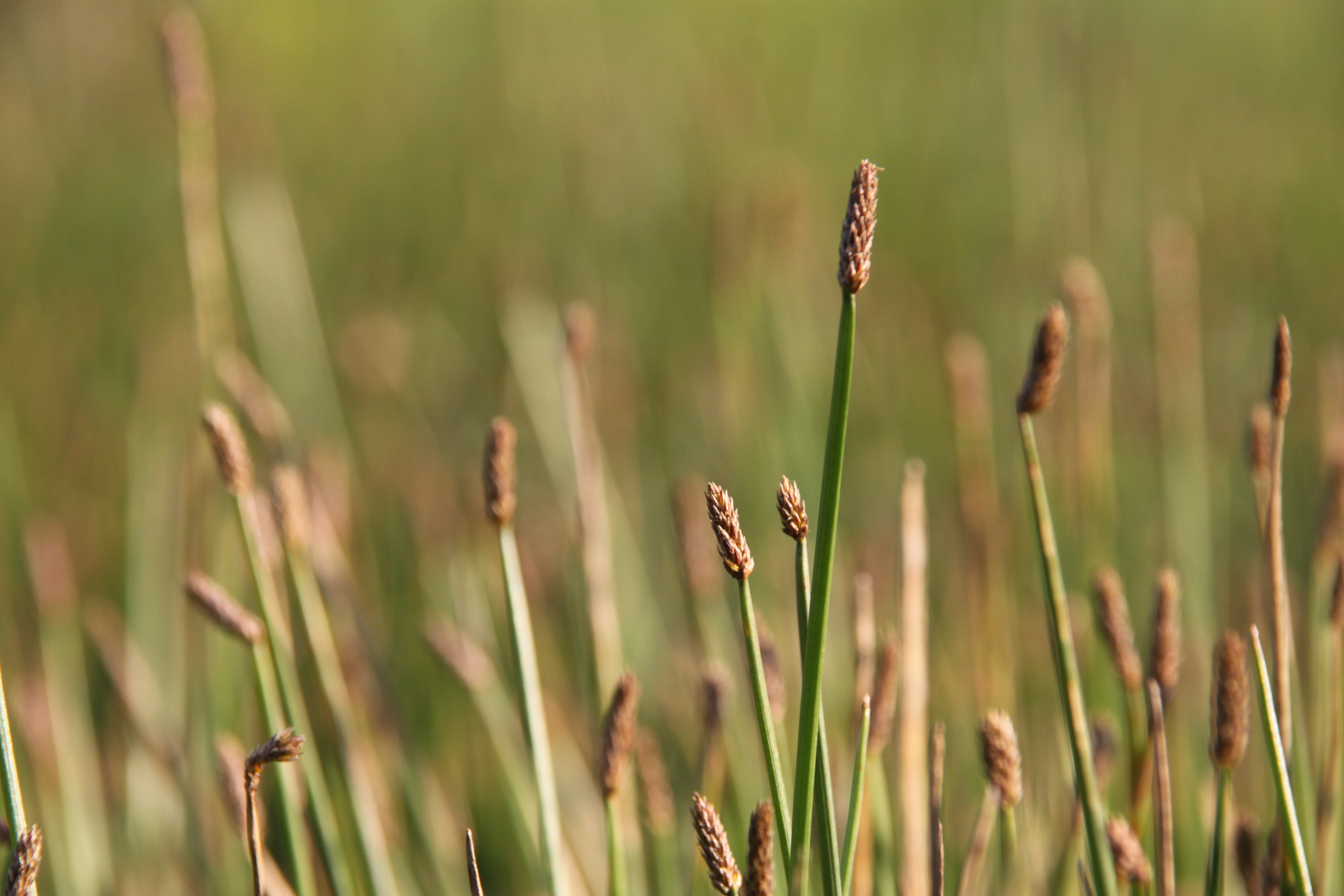
Eleocharis palustris in Rehovot vernal pool, Israel
