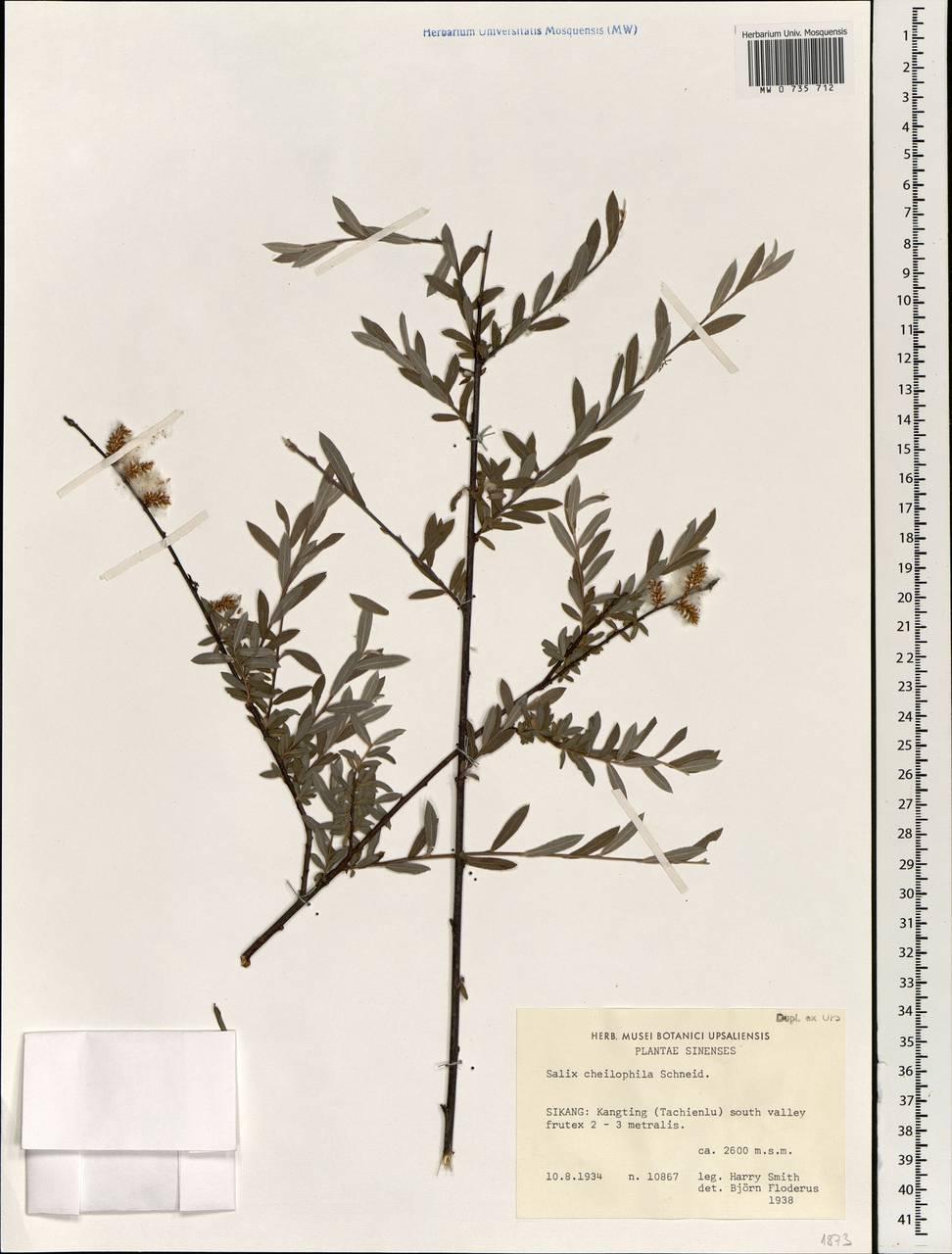

Scientific classification
- Kingdom: Plantae
- Clade: Tracheophytes
- Clade: Angiosperms
- Clade: Eudicots
- Clade: Rosids
- Order: Malpighiales
- Family: Salicaceae
- Genus: Salix
- Species: S. cheilophila

Binomial name
- Salix cheilophila C.K.Schneid.

= Salix cheilophila =

Shrub in the genus of willows

Salix cheilophila is a shrub or small tree from the genus of willow (Salix) with initially tomentose hairy and later balding branches. The leaf blades have lengths of 2.5 to sometimes 6 centimeters. The natural range of the species is in China.

== Description ==
Salix cheilophila is a shrub or small tree up to 5 meters high with gray-black or red-black branches that are initially tomentose and then bald. The buds are hairy shaggy. The leaves have a very short stem. The leaf blade is linear, linear-wrong-lanceolate or wrongly lanceolate, 2.5 to 3.5 seldom up to 6 centimeters long and 3 to 5 seldom 10 millimeters wide, pointed or pointed, with a narrowed or seldom blunt base and serrated glandularly towards the tip of the leaf Leaf margin. The top is green and finely haired, the underside white-gray and densely hairy silky.

The male inflorescences are 1.5 to 2.5 centimeters long and 3 to 4 millimeters in diameter, almost sitting catkins with two to three leaves at the base. The bracts are obovate-oblong, with a blunt or edged tip and a downy, hairy base. Male flowers have a narrow, elongated, rarely bilobed nectar gland. The two stamens are completely grown together and bare, the anthers are yellow and four-fold. The female catkins are up to 2.5 inches long. The bracts are more or less round. Female flowers have a narrow, elongated nectar gland. The ovaryis ovate to ovoid-cylindrical, densely hairy or glabrous, sessile or with short stalk. The scar is short. Capsules about 3 millimeters long are formed as fruits. Salix cheilophila flowers from April to May when the leaves shoot, the fruits ripen in May.

== Range ==
The natural range is in the Chinese provinces of Gansu, Hebei, Henan, in Inner Mongolia, in Ningxia, Qinghai, Shaanxi, Shanxi, Sichuan, Yunnan, and in Tibet along rivers at altitudes of 700 to 3000 meters.

== Taxonomy ==
Salix cheilophila is a species of willow (genus Salix), in the family Salicaceae. It is assigned to the section Cheilophilae. It was first described scientifically in 1916 by Camillo Karl Schneider. The genus name Salix is Latin and has been used from time of the Romans for various willow species. The type is very similar to Salix wilhelmsiana.

There are four varieties:

- Salix cheilophila var. acuminata C.Wang & YLChou with obscure -lanceolate, 4 to 6 millimeters long and 7 to 10 millimeters wide, acuminate leaf blades. Female flowers have a short stalked ovary, the stylus is long and reaches about one third the length of the ovary. the distribution area is in the Chinese province of Hebei.
- Salix cheilophila var. cheilophila with linear or linear-inverted-lanceolate, 2.5 to 3 rarely 5 centimeters long and 3 to 5 rarely 7 millimeters wide, pointed or acuminate leaf blades. Female kittens are 1.3 to 2 inches long with a diameter of 1 to 2 millimeters. The bracts reach about two thirds of the length of the ovary. The ovary is densely hairy, the style short or absent.
- Salix cheilophila var. microstachyoides (C.Wang & PYFu) C.Wang & CFFang with short thick, 5 mm long to 6 and 2 to 3 millimeters by measuring female kitten. The bracts are usually about the same length as the ovary. Female flowers have two nectar glands, one adaxial and one abaxial. The species is mostly cultivated, the natural range is in Tibet. The taxon was first described as a separate species Salix microstachyoides.
- Salix cheilophila var. villosa G.H.Wang with unterseits shaggy hairy bracts. Female flowers have an elongated style up to 3 millimeters long. The distribution area is in Hebei.

== Literature ==
- Wu Zheng-yi, Peter H. Raven (Ed.): Flora of China . Volume 4: Cycadaceae through Fagaceae . Science Press / Missouri Botanical Garden Press, Beijing / St. Louis 1999, ISBN 0-915279-70-3, pp. 263, 264 (English).
- Helmut Genaust: Etymological dictionary of botanical plant names. 3rd, completely revised and expanded edition. Nikol, Hamburg 2005, ISBN 3-937872-16-7, p. 552 (reprint from 1996).
