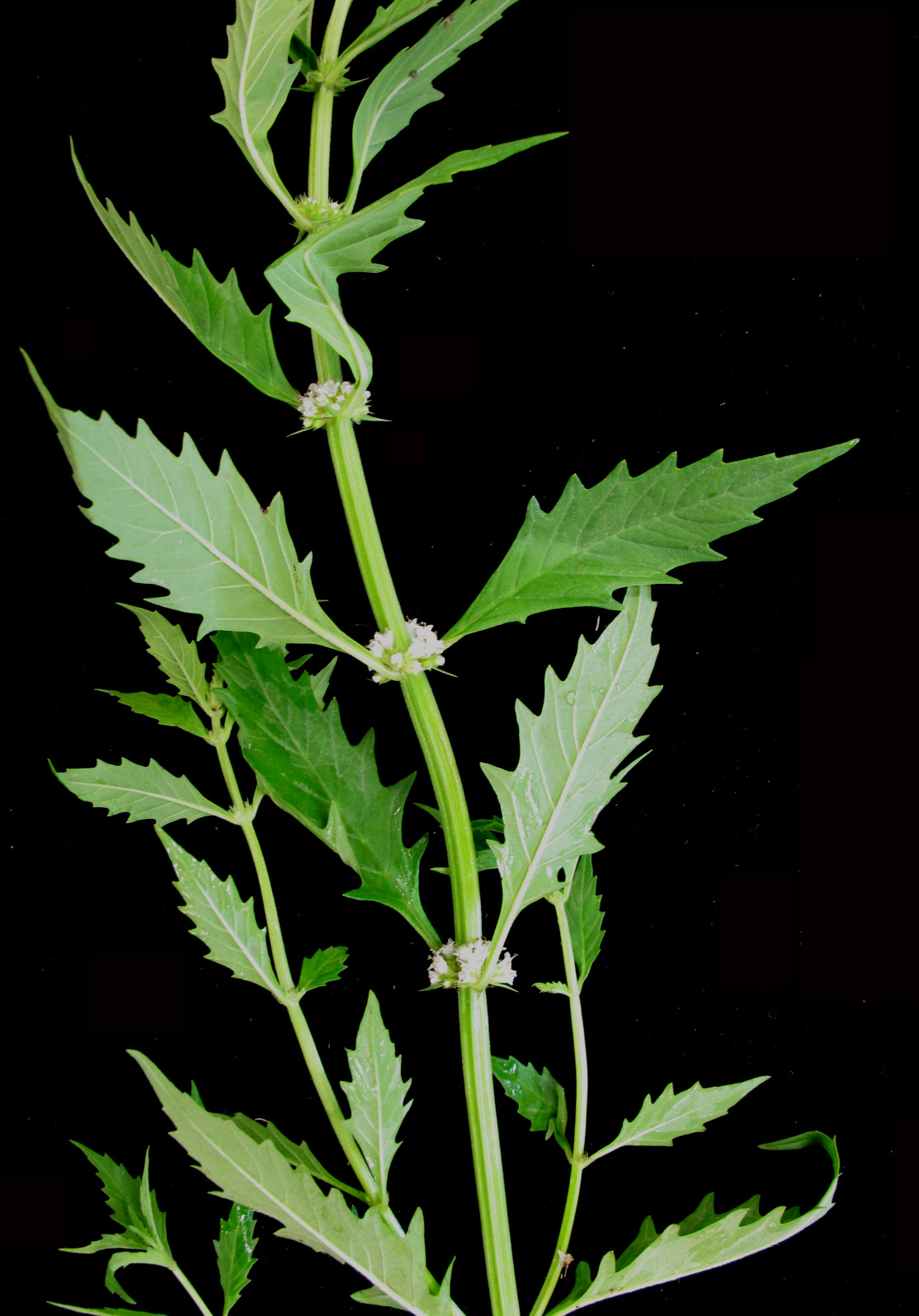

Conservation status
- Secure (NatureServe)

Scientific classification
- Kingdom: Plantae
- Clade: Tracheophytes
- Clade: Angiosperms
- Clade: Eudicots
- Clade: Asterids
- Order: Lamiales
- Family: Lamiaceae
- Genus: Lycopus
- Species: L. americanus

Binomial name
- Lycopus americanus Muhl. ex W.P.C.Barton
- L. americanus subsp. americanus; L. americanus subsp. laurentianus (Roll.-Germ.) Coursol & Bailleul

Synonyms
- List: Lycopus lucidus subsp. americanus (Muhl. ex W.P.C.Barton) Hultén; Lycopus lucidus var. americanus (Muhl. ex W.P.C.Barton) A.Gray; Phytosalpinx americana (Muhl. ex W.P.C.Barton) Lunell

= Lycopus americanus =

Plant species in the mint family

Lycopus americanus, common names American water horehound or American bugleweed, is a member of the genus Lycopus.

It blooms in late summer and is found in much of North America.

== Medicinal plant ==
It is reputed to have medicinal properties and has been used as a dye.
