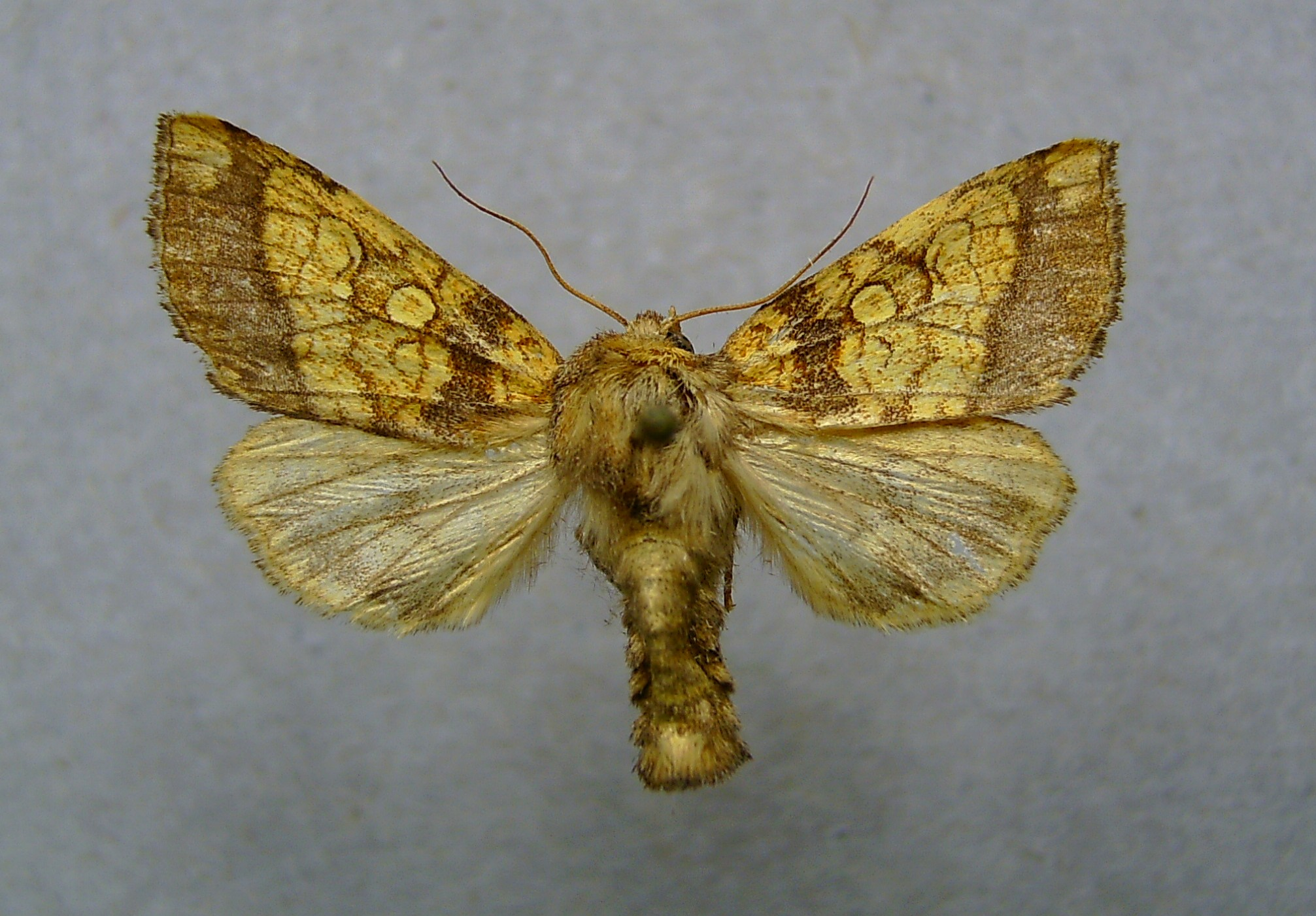

Scientific classification
- Domain: Eukaryota
- Kingdom: Animalia
- Phylum: Arthropoda
- Class: Insecta
- Order: Lepidoptera
- Superfamily: Noctuoidea
- Family: Noctuidae
- Subfamily: Noctuinae
- Tribe: Apameini
- Genus: Gortyna
- Species: G. flavago

Binomial name
- Gortyna flavago (Denis & Schiffermüller, 1775)

Synonyms
- Noctua flavago Denis & Schiffermüller, 1775; Phalaena ochracea Hübner, 1786; Phalaena lappae Donovan, 1801; Noctua ochraceago Haworth, 1809

= Frosted orange moth =

Species of moth

The frosted orange moth (Gortyna flavago) is a moth of the family Noctuidae which is found in Europe, Armenia, Syria and east through the Palearctic to western Siberia. It has also been recorded in Algeria. The species was first described by Michael Denis and Ignaz Schiffermüller in 1775. The frosted orange is a night-flying species with orange and brown speckled wings allow for perfect camouflage against autumn leaves in the daytime. It is attracted to light and does not come to flowers, and its larva inhabit the stems and roots of the species' food plants.

== Technical description and variation ==
Its wingspan ranges from 3 to 4.3 cm. The forewing is yellow, thickly dusted with bright ferruginous, the space between subbasal and inner lines and that between outer and submarginal lines, filled up with dull liver brown; the lines and veins finely red brown; all three stigmata pale yellow with darker centres and brown outlines, the reniform containing an outlined lunule; submarginal line yellowish ending in a yellow apical blotch: hindwing dirty luteous (muddy yellow), with veins and cellspot, the outer line and a submarginal cloud grey; - in ab. suffusa ab. nov. [Warren] the forewing is wholly suffused with ferruginous; - cinarea Goosens from Algeria is pale yellow or reddish grey, with a dark patch between the stigmata, which are almost obsolete: the terminal area of ground colour or violet brown without any pale apical patch: hindwing without markings, whitish grey.

Similar Gortyna species occurring in the same distribution area show longer elongated forewings and are also usually considerably larger overall. A genital morphological examination should be used for determination. The very similar species Gortyna fortis and Gortyna basalipuncta found in the East Palearctic have no geographical overlap with flavago.

== Biology ==
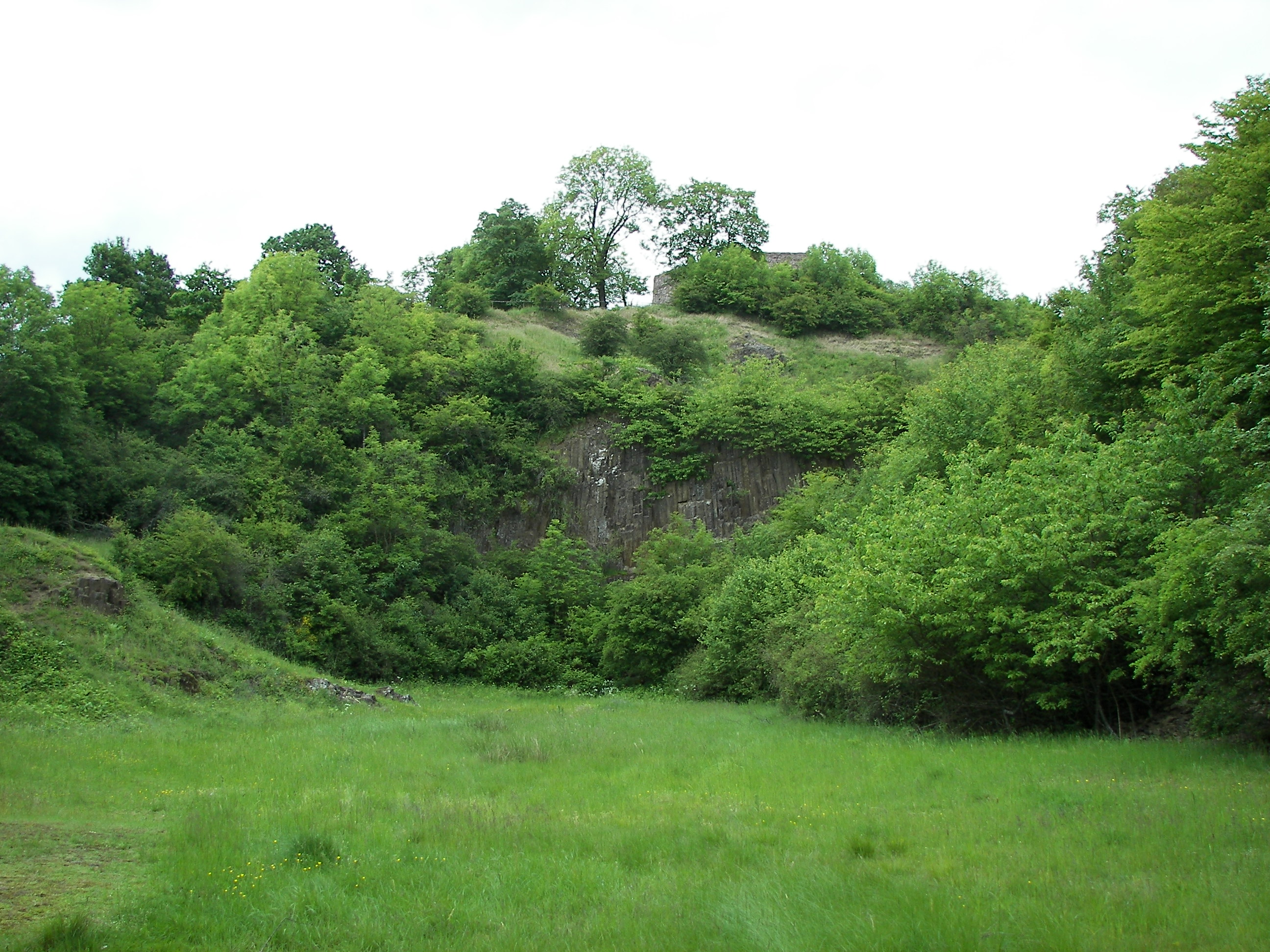
Habitat in Germany

It flies between August and October. Northern variants tend to be slightly darker.

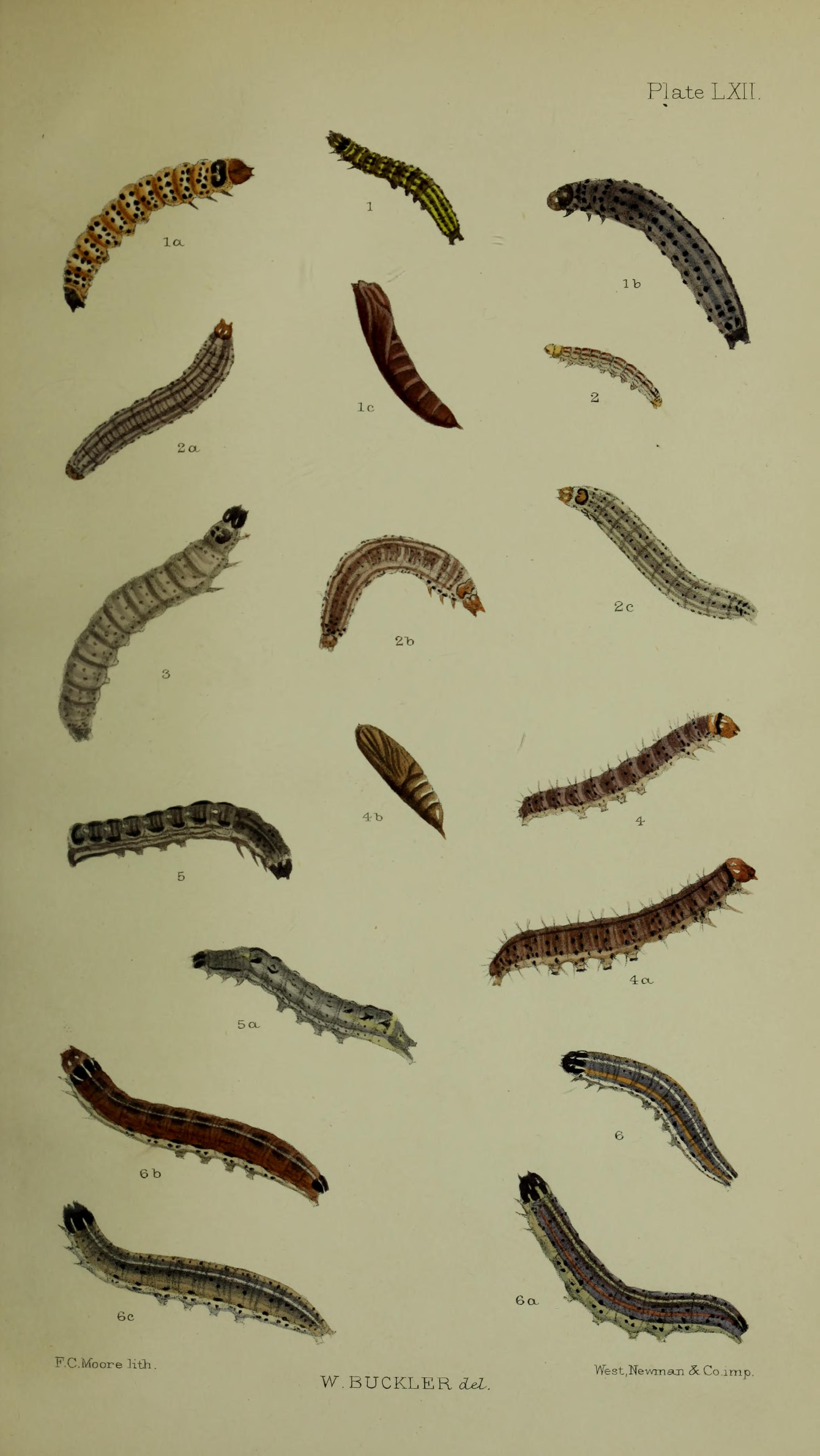
Figs 1 young larva in stem of ragwort, 1a adult larva in stem of burdock, 1b larvae after final moult in stem of Verbascum nigrum

The Larva is dirty white or yellowish, the dorsum dark red, with three faintly paler longitudinal lines; tubercles, and also the spiracles, black; head and plates dark brown. They feed on Sambucus racemosa, Filipendula ulmaria, Helianthus annuus and Arctium species – Arctium tomentosum, A. minus. The larvae are considered a pest on foxglove (Digitalis purpurea).
