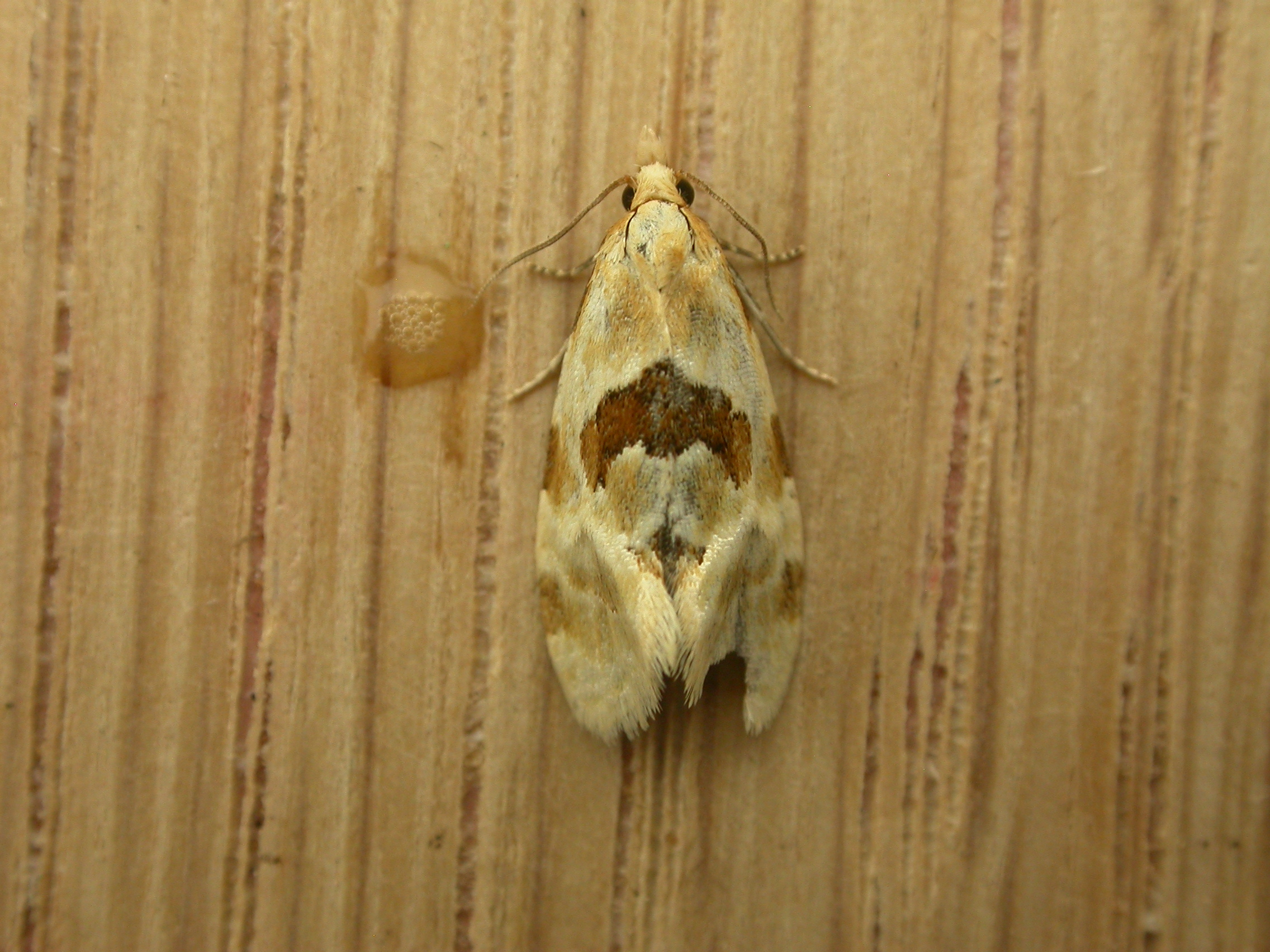

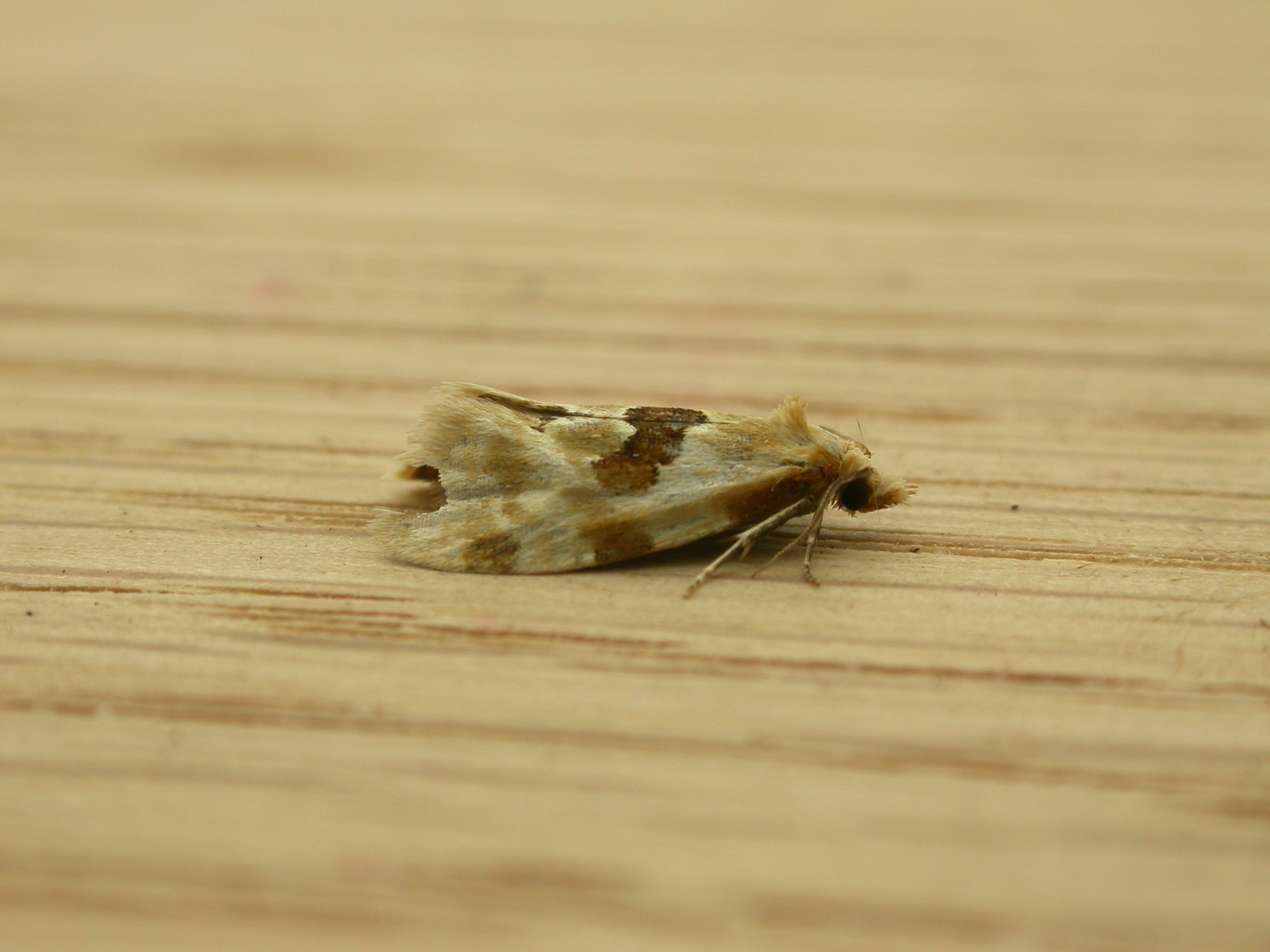

Scientific classification
- Domain: Eukaryota
- Kingdom: Animalia
- Phylum: Arthropoda
- Class: Insecta
- Order: Lepidoptera
- Family: Tortricidae
- Genus: Aethes
- Species: A. rubigana

Binomial name
- Aethes rubigana (Treitschke, 1830)

Synonyms
- Tortrix rubigana Treitschke, 1830; Tortrix badiana Hübner, [1796-1799]; Cochylis rubigana var. obscurana Chrétien, 1893; Aethes rubidana Kuznetzov, in Falkovitsh & Medvedev, 1989

= Aethes rubigana =

Species of moth

Aethes rubigana, the burdock conch, is a moth of the family Tortricidae. It was described by Treitschke in 1830. It is found in most of Europe, except the Iberian Peninsula and part of the Balkan Peninsula. Outside of Europe, it is found in China (Beijing, Hebei, Heilongjiang, Jilin, Liaoning, Ningxia), Japan and Russia.

The wingspan is 15–19 millimetres (0.59–0.75 in). The forewings have a moderately arched costa. They pale ochreous, with several obscure shining whitish striae with a dark brown spot along the base of the costa. There is a narrow dark brown antemedian fascia, angulated above the middle and interrupted below the angle and abruptly dilated on the dorsum . The subterminal fascia is represented by dark brown spots on costa and dorsum, and a very indistinct spot between them. The hindwings are rather dark grey.

Adults are on wing from late June to August in western Europe.

The larvae feed on the seedheads Arctium species (including Arctium lappa and possibly Arctium minus). Full-grown larvae overwinter from October in a cocoon on the ground or occasionally in the seedhead. Pupation takes place within this cocoon.
