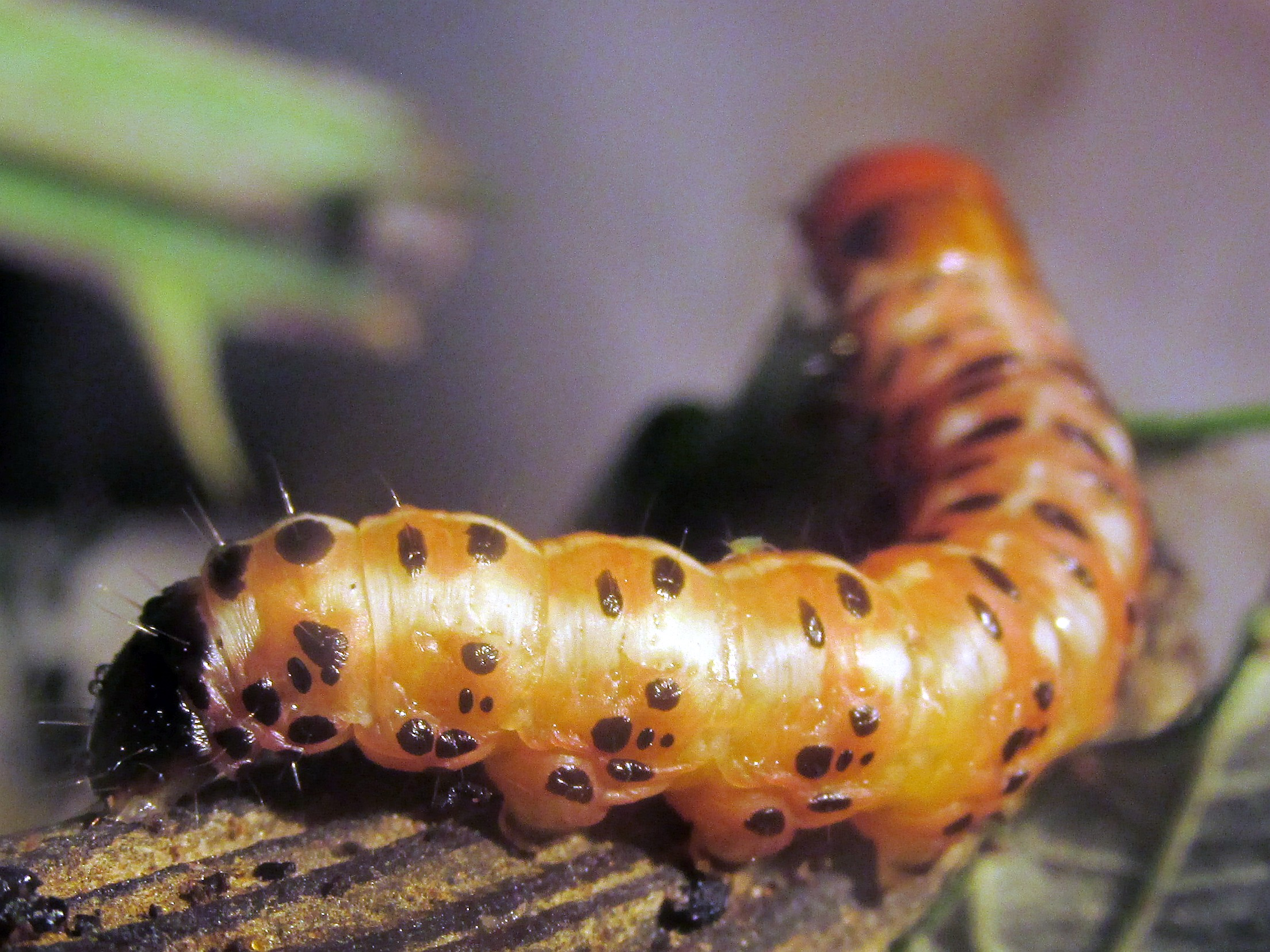

Scientific classification
- Domain: Eukaryota
- Kingdom: Animalia
- Phylum: Arthropoda
- Class: Insecta
- Order: Lepidoptera
- Superfamily: Noctuoidea
- Family: Noctuidae
- Subfamily: Noctuinae
- Tribe: Apameini
- Genus: Gortyna
- Species: G. xanthenes

Binomial name
- Gortyna xanthenes Germar, 1842

Synonyms
- Hydroecia franciscae Turati 1913; Hydroecia ifranae Le Cerf 1933

= Gortyna xanthenes =

Species of moth

Gortyna xanthenes, the artichoke moth, is a moth of the family Noctuidae. It was described by Ernst Friedrich Germar in 1842. It is found on the Canary Islands, the Balearic Islands, Corsica, Sardinia, Sicily and Malta as well as in Portugal, Spain, France, Italy and Greece.
