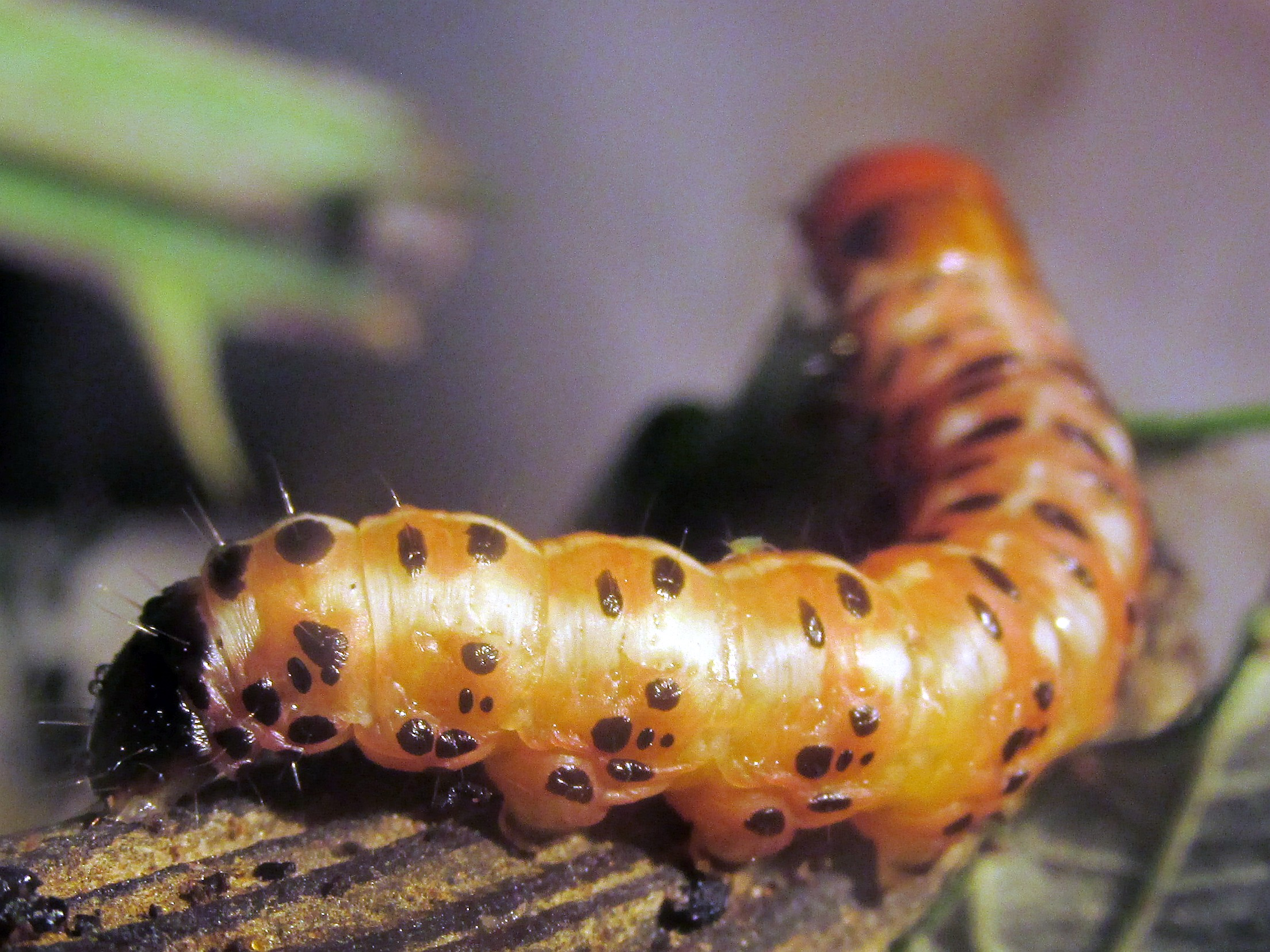
- Gortyna xanthenes

Scientific classification
- Kingdom: Animalia
- Phylum: Arthropoda
- Clade: Pancrustacea
- Class: Insecta
- Order: Lepidoptera
- Superfamily: Noctuoidea
- Family: Noctuidae
- Subfamily: Noctuinae
- Tribe: Apameini
- Genus: Gortyna; Ochsenheimer, 1816

Synonyms
- Gnephozeta Billberg, 1820; Ochria Hübner, [1821]; Xanthoecia Hampson, 1908

= Gortyna (moth) =

Genus of moths

Gortyna is a moth genus in the family Noctuidae.

== Species ==
- Gortyna basalipunctata Gaeser, 1888
- Gortyna borelii Pierret, 1837 (= Hydroecia leucographa)
- Gortyna flavago (Denis & Schiffermüller, 1775)
- Gortyna flavina Hreblay & Ronkay, 1997
- Gortyna fortis (Butler, 1878)
- Gortyna franciscae (Turati, 1913)
- Gortyna golestanensis (Fibiger & Zahiri, 2006)
- Gortyna hethitica Hacker, Kuhna & Gross, 1986
- Gortyna imitans Hreblay & Ronkay, 1997
- Gortyna joannisi (Boursin, 1928)
- Gortyna moesiaca Herrich-Schäffer, [1849]
- Gortyna osmana Hacker & Kuhna, 1986
- Gortyna plumbeata Hreblay & Ronkay, 1997
- Gortyna plumbitincta Hreblay & Ronkay, 1997
- Gortyna puengeleri (Turati, 1909)
- Gortyna rungsi (Boursin, 1963)
- Gortyna xanthenes Germar, [1842]
