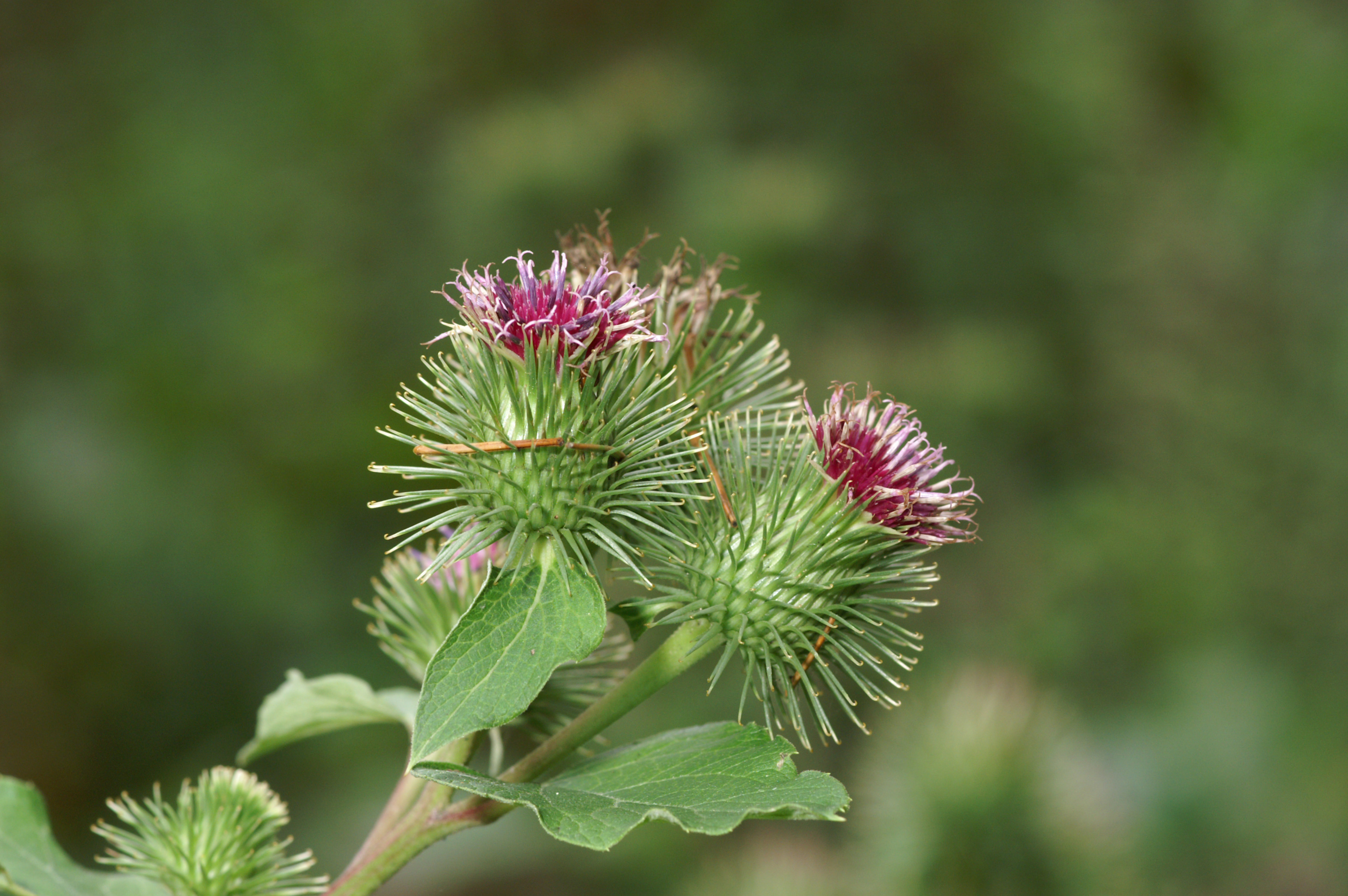

Scientific classification
- Kingdom: Plantae
- Clade: Tracheophytes
- Clade: Angiosperms
- Clade: Eudicots
- Clade: Asterids
- Order: Asterales
- Family: Asteraceae
- Genus: Arctium
- Species: A. nemorosum

Binomial name
- Arctium nemorosum Lej.

= Arctium nemorosum =

Species of flowering plant

Wood burdock (Arctium nemorosum) is a species of flowering plant belonging to the family Asteraceae.

Its native range is Europe to Caucasus. It was first described in 1833.
