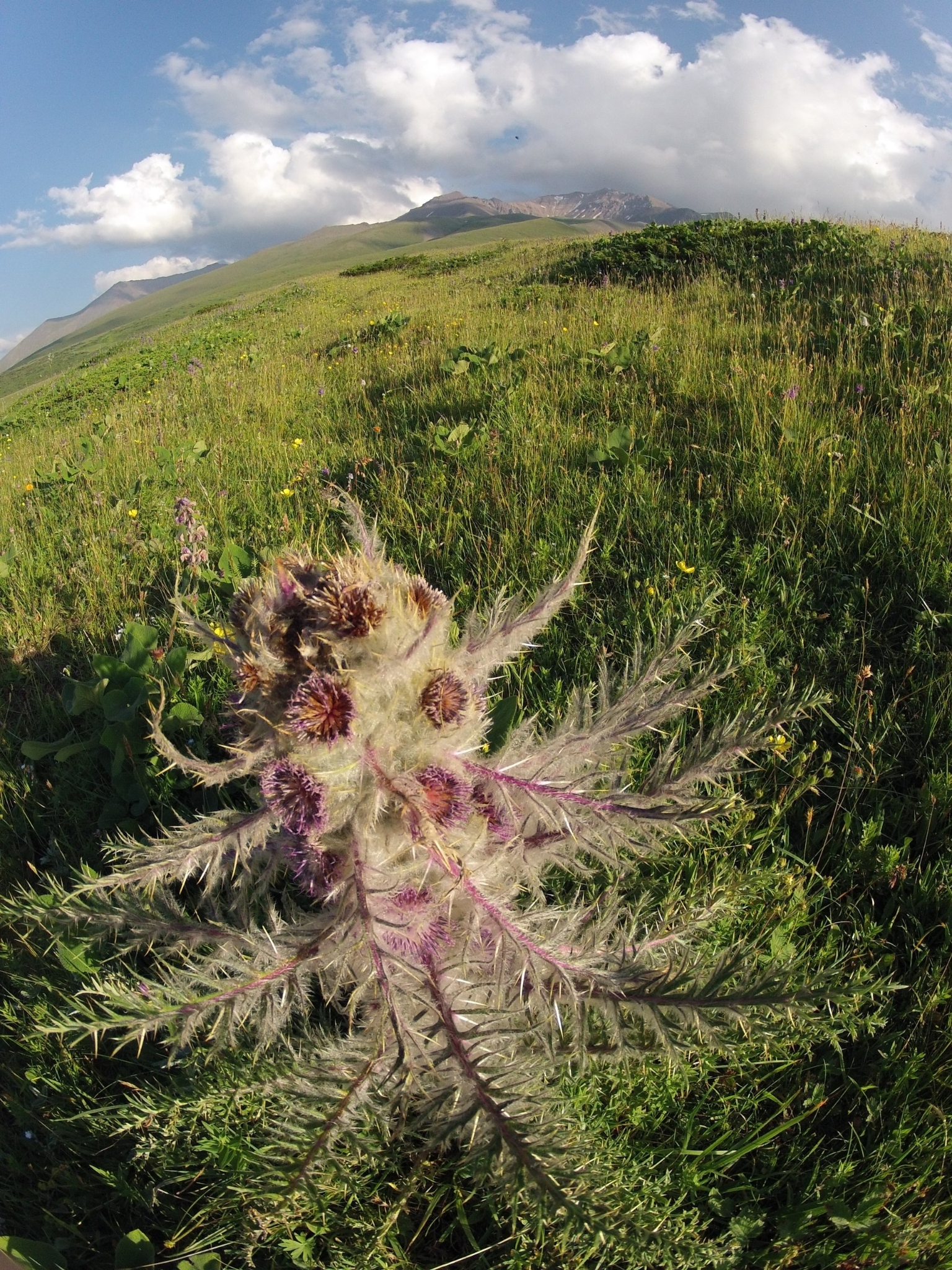

Scientific classification
- Kingdom: Plantae
- Clade: Tracheophytes
- Clade: Angiosperms
- Clade: Eudicots
- Clade: Asterids
- Order: Asterales
- Family: Asteraceae
- Genus: Arctium
- Species: A. nidulans

Binomial name
- Arctium nidulans (Regel) Sennikov

Synonyms
- Arctium eriophorum (Regel & Schmalh.) Kuntze; Carduus horridus B.Fedtsch.; Cirsium nidulans Regel; Cnicus nidulans (Regel) Krasn.; Cousinia eriophora Regel & Schmalh.; Jurinea horrida Rupr.; Schmalhausenia eriophora (Regel & Schmalh.) C.Winkl.; Schmalhausenia nidulans (Regel) Tscherneva, nom. illeg.

= Arctium nidulans =

Flowering plant native to Central Asia

Arctium nidulans is a species of flowering plant in the family Asteraceae, native from Central Asia to north-west Xinjiang. It was first described by Eduard August von Regel in 1867 as Cirsium nidulans.
