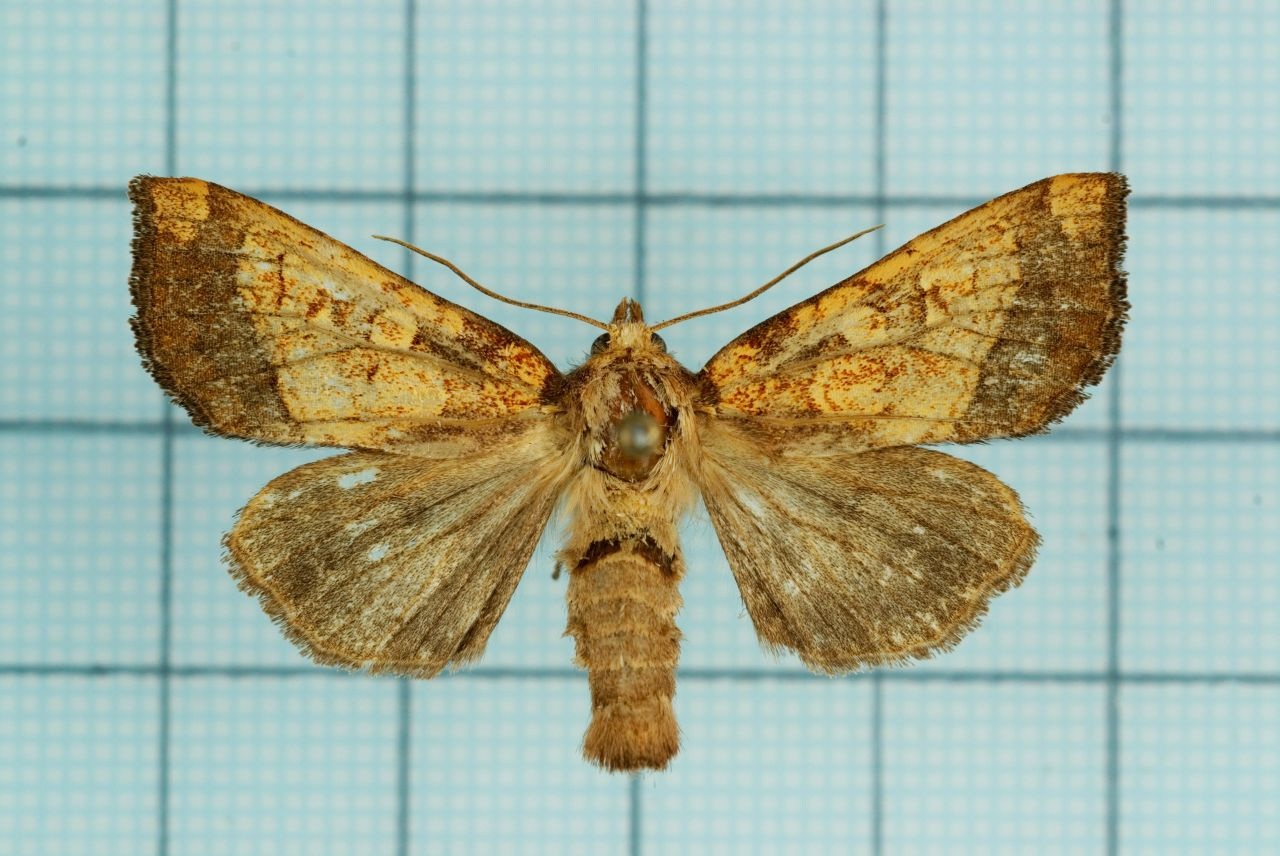

Scientific classification
- Kingdom: Animalia
- Phylum: Arthropoda
- Clade: Pancrustacea
- Class: Insecta
- Order: Lepidoptera
- Superfamily: Noctuoidea
- Family: Noctuidae
- Subfamily: Noctuinae
- Tribe: Apameini
- Genus: Gortyna
- Species: G. flavina

Binomial name
- Gortyna flavina Hreblay & Ronkay, 1997

= Gortyna flavina =

Species of moth

Gortyna flavina is a moth in the family Noctuidae. It is found in Taiwan.
