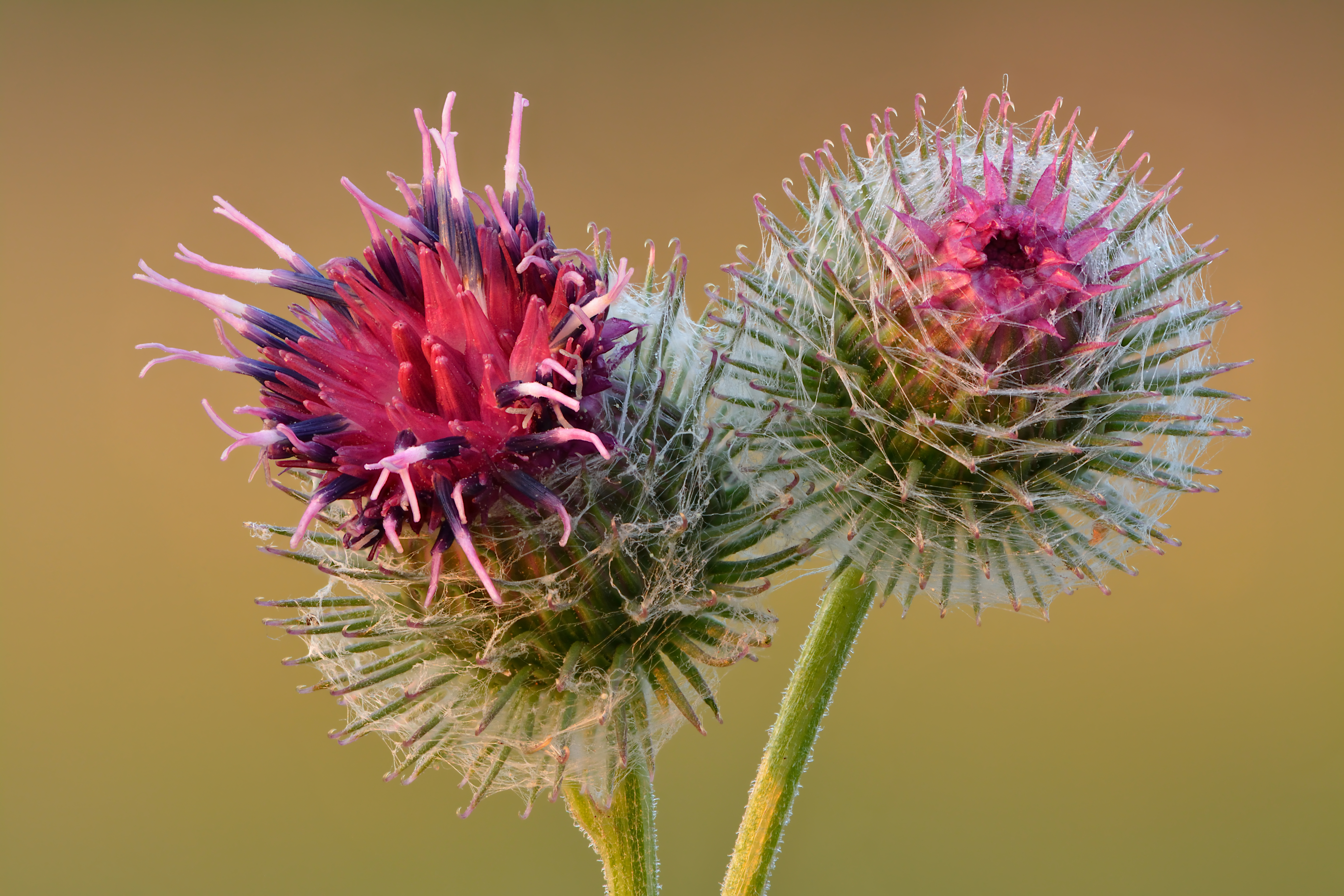
- Close-up on flowers

Scientific classification
- Kingdom: Plantae
- Clade: Tracheophytes
- Clade: Angiosperms
- Clade: Eudicots
- Clade: Asterids
- Order: Asterales
- Family: Asteraceae
- Genus: Arctium
- Species: A. tomentosum

Binomial name
- Arctium tomentosum Mill. 1768

Synonyms
- Arctium leptophyllum Klokov; Lappa tomentosa (Mill.) Lam.

= Arctium tomentosum =

Species of flowering plant

Arctium tomentosum, commonly known as the woolly burdock or downy burdock, is a species of burdock belonging to the family Asteraceae.

== Description ==
Arctium tomentosum is a biennial herbaceous plant. The stem is erect, with ascending branches. It can reach a height of about 2 metres (6 ft 7 in). Leaves are grayish white and quite felted, green and glabrous toward the stem. Basal leaves are petiolate. Leaf blade is heart-shaped, with rather denticulater margins. They can reach a length of 20–50 centimetres (7.9–19.7 in) and a width of 10–30 centimetres (3.9–11.8 in). Flowers are purplish red, with a diameter of 0.9–1.2 centimetres (0.35–0.47 in). This species can be distinguished from related ones because the underside of the leaves is covered with white woolly hairs. Flowers and fruits appear from July to September.

== Taxonomy ==
Arctium tomentosum was first described by the English botanist Philip Miller in 1768.

== Distribution ==
Arctium tomentosum is native to Eurasia from Spain to Xinjiang Province in western China. It is also naturalized in other parts of the world such as North America.

== Gallery ==
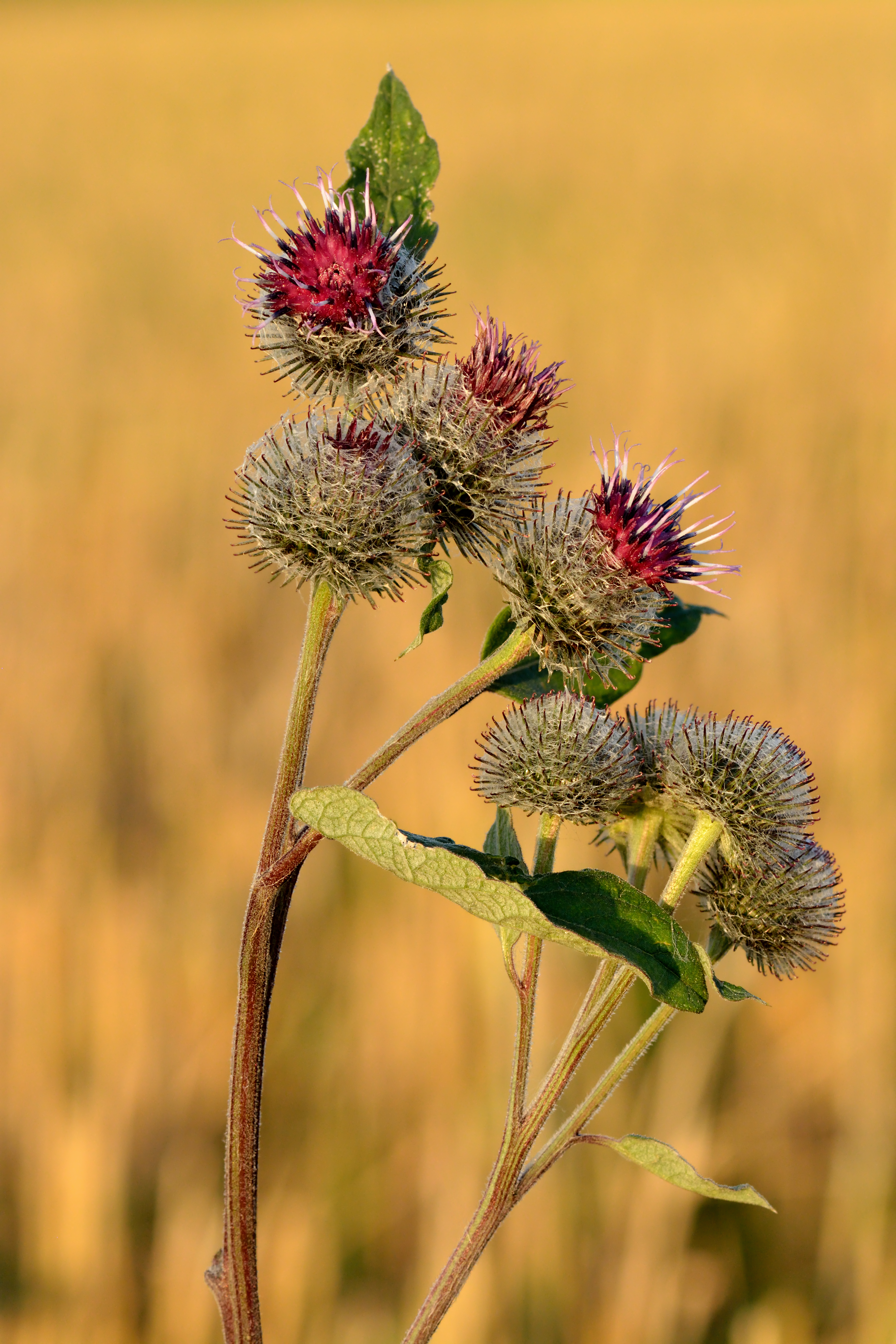
Plant

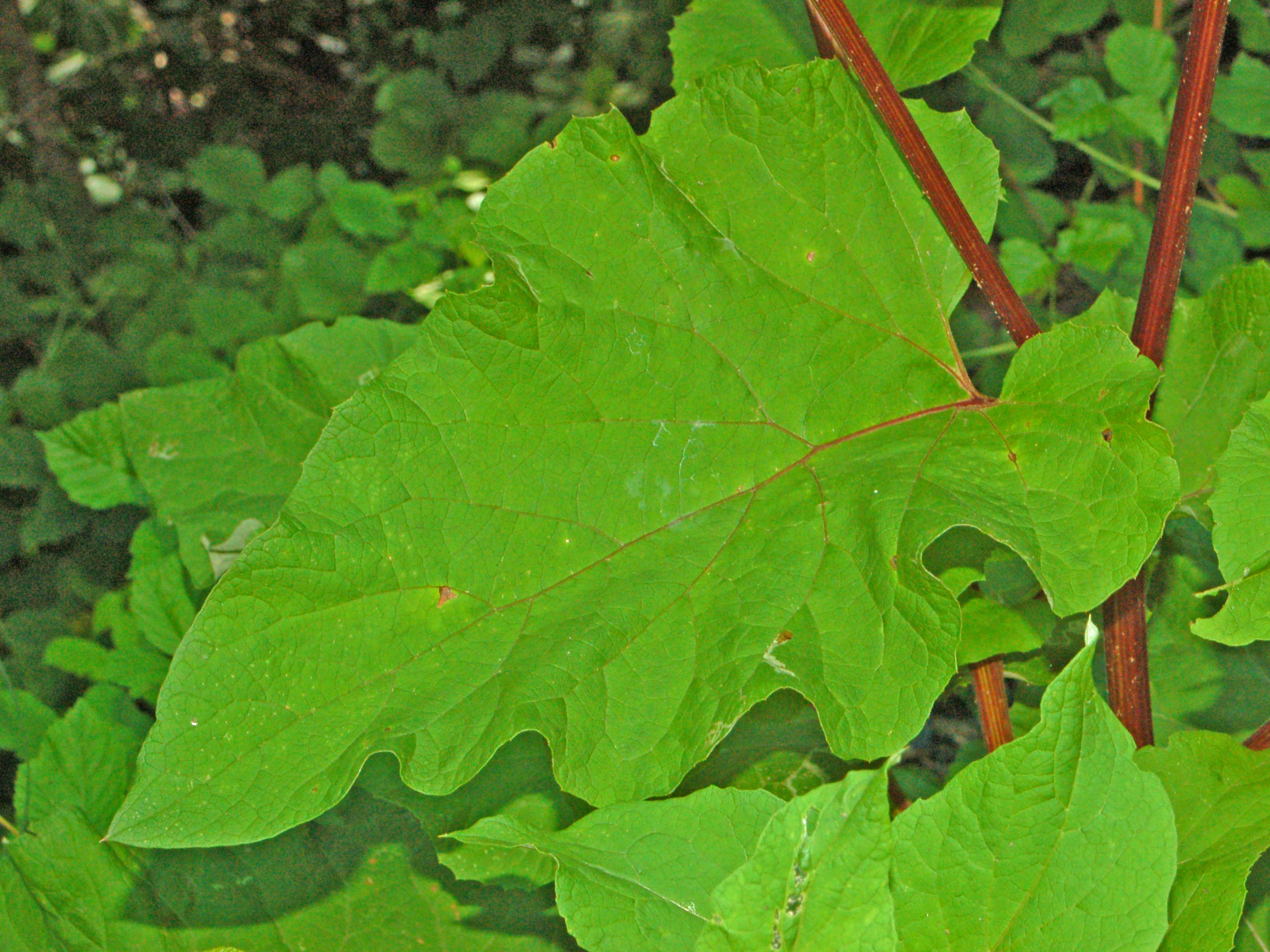
Leaf

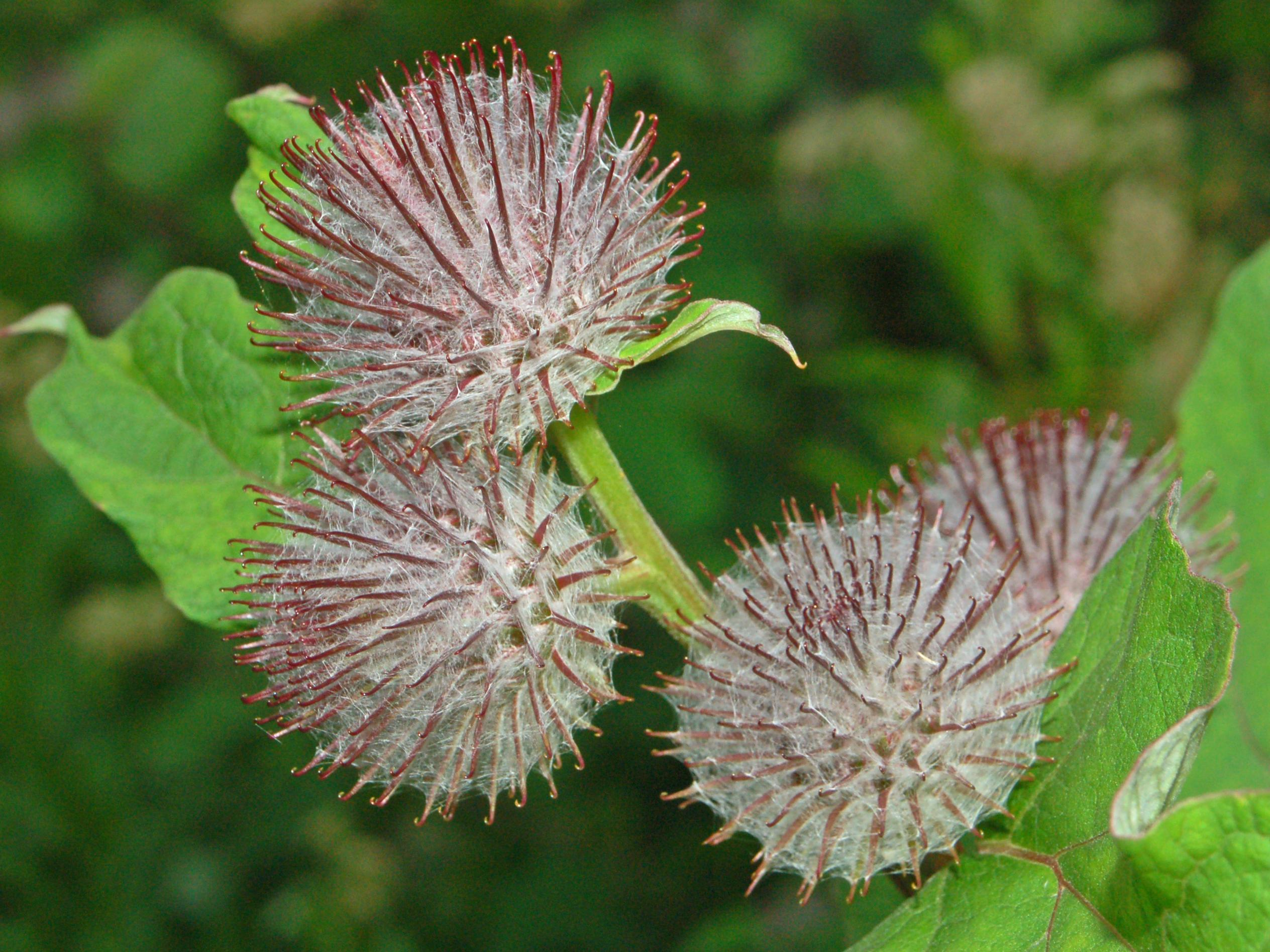
Inflorescence

== Bibliography ==
- Javzandolgor, Chuluunbat; Baasanmunkh, Shukherdorj; Tsegmed, Zagarjav; Oyuntsetseg, Batlai; Gundegmaa, Vanjil; Choi, Hyeok Jae (2021). "Arctium tomentosum (Asteraceae): A new report of a native genus in the flora of Mongolia" (PDF). Korean Journal of Plant Taxonomy. 51 (4): 391–394. doi:10.11110/kjpt.2021.51.4.391.
- López-Vinyallonga, Sara; Romaschenko, Kostyantyn; Susanna, Alfonso; Garcia-Jacas, Núria (April 2011). "Systematics of the Arctioid group: Disentangling Arctium and Cousinia (Cardueae, Carduinae)". Taxon. 60 (2): 539–554. doi:10.1002/tax.602020. hdl:10261/35343.
- Pignatti S. - Flora d'Italia (3 voll.) - Edagricole - 1982
- Tutin, T.G. et al. - Flora Europaea, second edition - 1993
- Zangheri P. - Flora Italica (2 voll.) - Cedam - 1976
