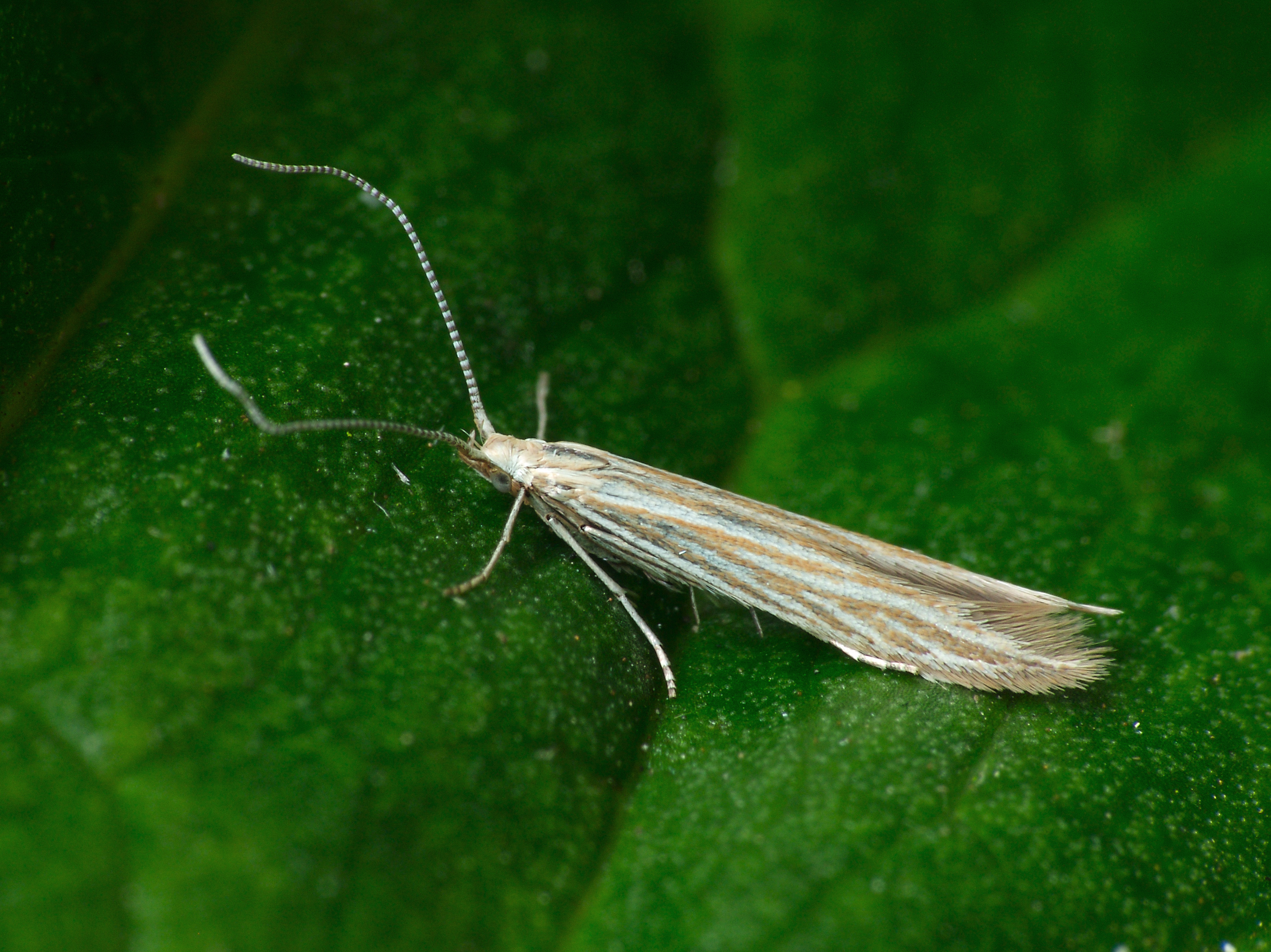

Scientific classification
- Kingdom: Animalia
- Phylum: Arthropoda
- Class: Insecta
- Order: Lepidoptera
- Family: Coleophoridae
- Genus: Coleophora
- Species: C. peribenanderi

Binomial name
- Coleophora peribenanderi Toll, 1943

Synonyms
- Coleophora benanderi Toll, 1942; Coleophora trochilella Hering, 1957

= Coleophora peribenanderi =

Species of moth

Coleophora peribenanderi is a moth of the family Coleophoridae.

== Description ==
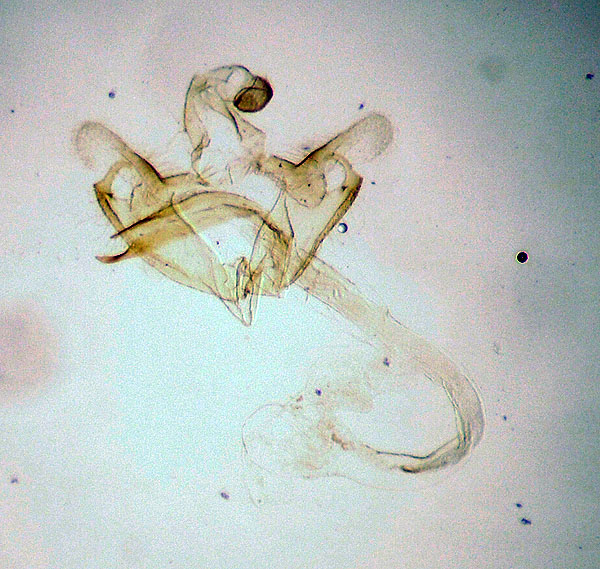

The wingspan is 12.5–15 mm. it is one of a number of Coleophora species with longitudinal forewing white/pale streaks and with oblique streaks on or between veins extending to the costa and without scattered fuscous scales. Only reliably identified by dissection and microscopic examination of the genitalia.

Adults are on wing from June to July. Full-grown cases can be found from September to October. After hibernation, the larvae usually does not feed anymore and pupates.

== Distribution ==
It has been recorded from Ireland, Great Britain, France, Spain, Italy, Belgium, the Netherlands, Germany, Denmark, Fennoscandia, Poland, the Baltic region, Ukraine, southern and central Russia, Bulgaria, Romania, Slovakia, Greece, Czech Republic, Hungary as well as the Near East.
