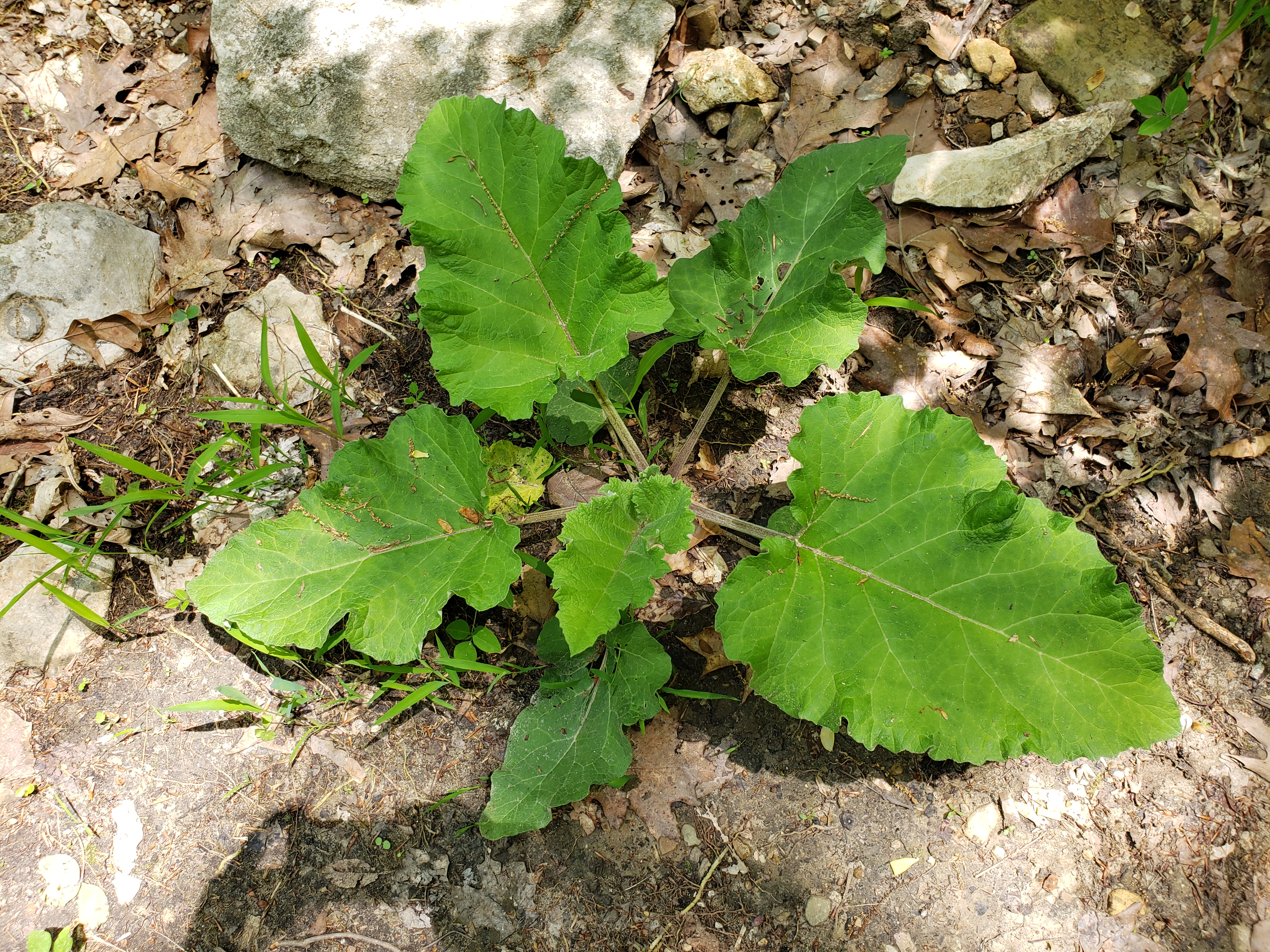
- Leaves

Scientific classification
- Kingdom: Plantae
- Clade: Tracheophytes
- Clade: Angiosperms
- Clade: Eudicots
- Clade: Asterids
- Order: Asterales
- Family: Asteraceae
- Genus: Arctium
- Species: A. minus

Binomial name
- Arctium minus (Hill) Bernh. 1800 not Schkuhr 1803

Synonyms
- Synonymy: Arcion minus Bubani; Arctium chabertii Briq. & Cavill.; Arctium conglomeratum Schur ex Nyman; Arctium euminus Syme; Arctium lappa Kalm 1765 not L. 1753; Arctium montanum Steud.; Arctium pubens Bab.; Bardana minor Hill; Lappa minor Hill; Lappa pubens (Bab.) Boreau

= Arctium minus =

Species of flowering plant

Arctium minus, commonly known as lesser burdock, little burdock, louse-bur, common burdock, button-bur, cuckoo-button, or wild rhubarb, is a biennial plant native to Europe.

== Description ==
Arctium minus is a biennial plant growing up to 1.8 metres (6 ft) tall and form multiple branches. It is large and bushy. The leaves are up to 50 cm (20 in) long and ovate. The lower leaves are heart-shaped and have very wavy margins. Leaves are dark green above and woolly below. It grows an extremely deep taproot, up to 30 cm (12 in) into the ground. The plant produces flowers in its second year of growth, from July to October. The flowers are prickly and pink to purple in color. The flower heads are about 2 cm (3/4 in) wide, surrounded by a cluster of bracts. The outer bracts end in hooks causing a hook-and-loop effect after the flower head dries, when the bracts will attach to humans and animals to transport the seedhead.

The flowers resemble and can be easily mistaken for thistles, but burdock can be distinguished by its extremely large leaves and its hooked bracts.

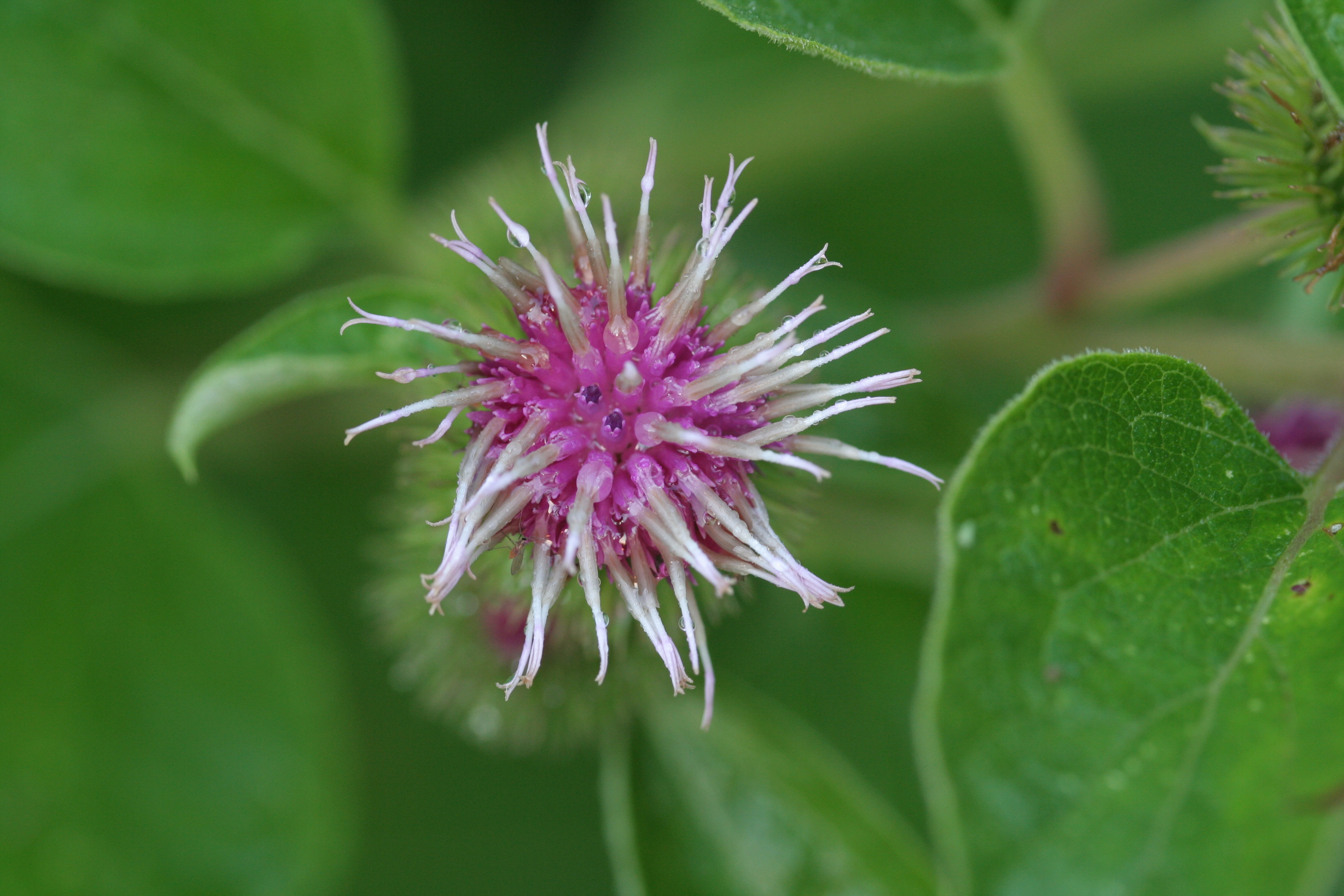
Flower

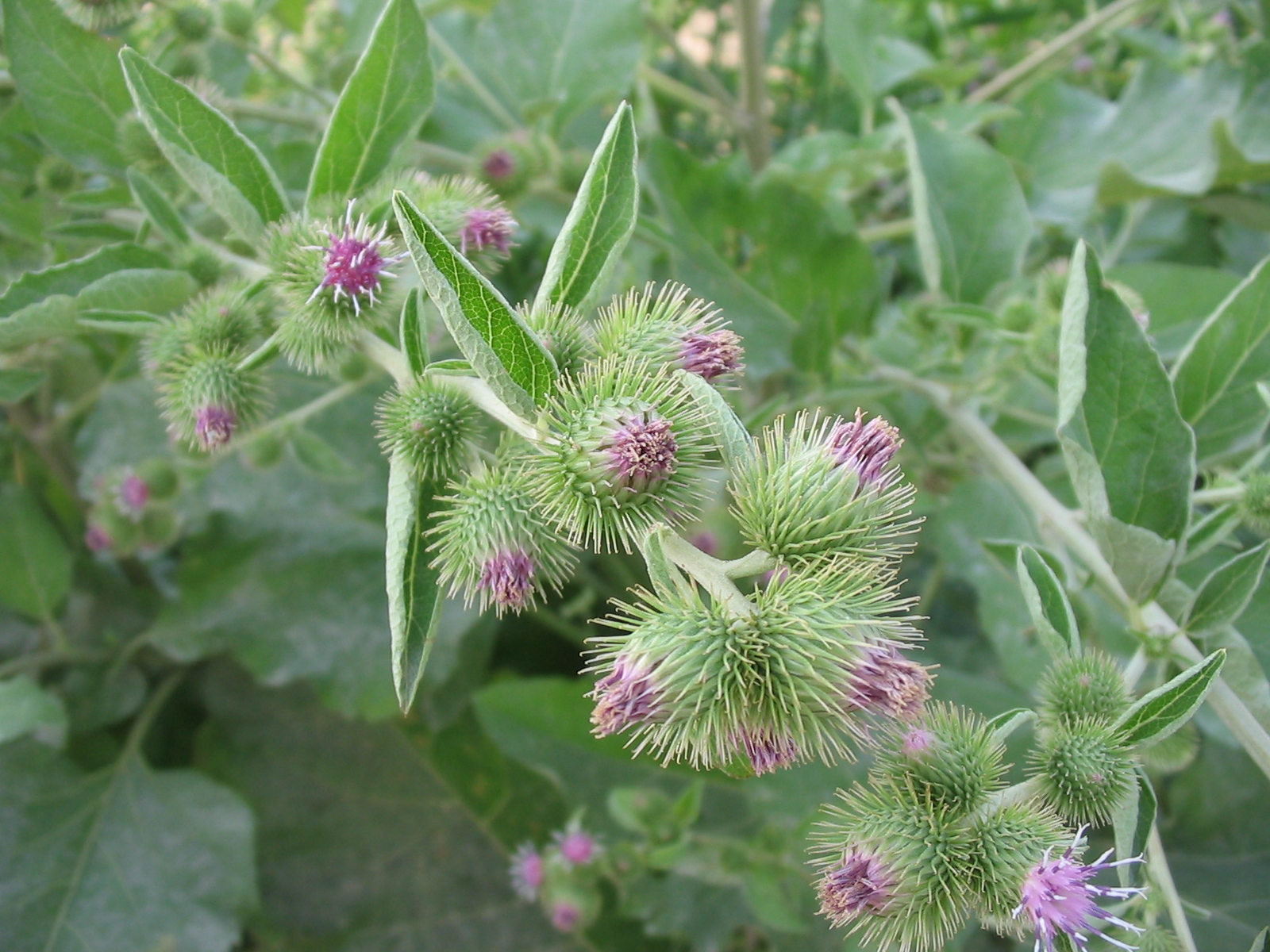
Flower buds

== Distribution and habitat ==
The plant is native to Europe, but has become introduced elsewhere such as Australia, North and South America, and other places.

== Uses ==
The leafstalks (up to a year old), leaves, and flower stalks can be eaten raw or cooked. The roots are edible boiled with a change of water, though become too woody to eat in plants over a year old. The leaves can also be used to make herbal tea.
