= Sundarbans East Wildlife Sanctuary =

Protected forest in Bangladesh

Coordinates: 21.946°N 89.790°E

Sundarbans East Wildlife Sanctuary, a protected forest in Bangladesh, extends over an area of 31,227 ha. of mangrove forest. It was established in 1977 under the Bangladesh Wildlife (Preservation) (Amendment) Act, 1974, having previously been a forest reserve. It is the most fertile of the three, non-adjoining wildlife sanctuaries established in the Sundarbans at that time, the others being the Sundarbans West Wildlife Sanctuary and the Sundarbans South Wildlife Sanctuary. The dominant mangrove species is "sundri" (Heritiera fomes) from which the Sundarbans region gets its name.

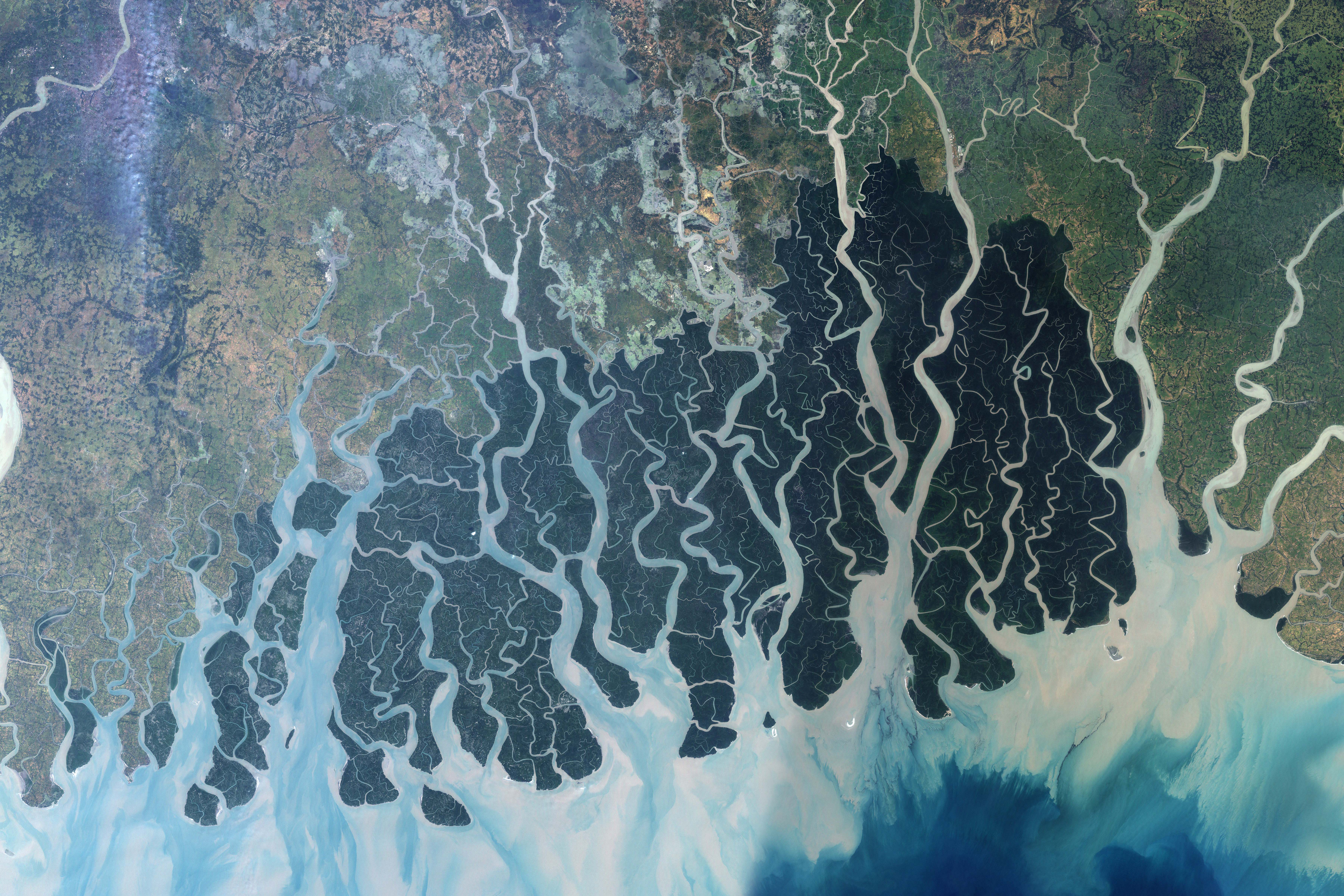
Sundarbans East Wildlife Sanctuary is in the lower right portion of the dark area on the right of this satellite image of the Sundarbans

== Geography ==
The Sundarbans East Wildlife Sanctuary is in a low-lying area of flat islands interspersed by a network of waterways. It is situated between the Katka and Supati Kals creeks in the Ganges Delta and is bounded to the south by the Bay of Bengal. The Baleshwari River supplies some freshwater but otherwise the waters are saline, being constantly replenished by the rise and fall of the tide. Sands collect near the mouth of the creeks and is blown into dunes and in their lee, silt accumulates. The altitude of the sanctuary varies between 0 and 3 m (0 and 10 ft) above sea level. The soil is more fertile than that of Sundarbans West Wildlife Sanctuary and Sundarbans South Wildlife Sanctuary because a larger quantity of sediment is deposited here by the River Ganges. As the land is raised by accumulating silt, it gets inundated by the tide less often. The soil pH is mostly between 7.0 and 8.0.

Up to 280 cm (110 in) of rainfall falls at the coast with most precipitation being during the monsoon, which lasts from June to October. The driest months are December, January and February. In the winter the temperature may fall as low as 2 to 4 °C (36 to 39 °F) but rises to a maximum of about 43 °C (109 °F) in April and May. The mean annual temperature is about 26 °C (79 °F). The average relative humidity is high, ranging between 77 and 80%, and peaking during the monsoon at 95%. There are four main types of habitat in the sanctuary; mangrove woodlands, grasslands, sandy beaches and areas of transition.

== Flora ==
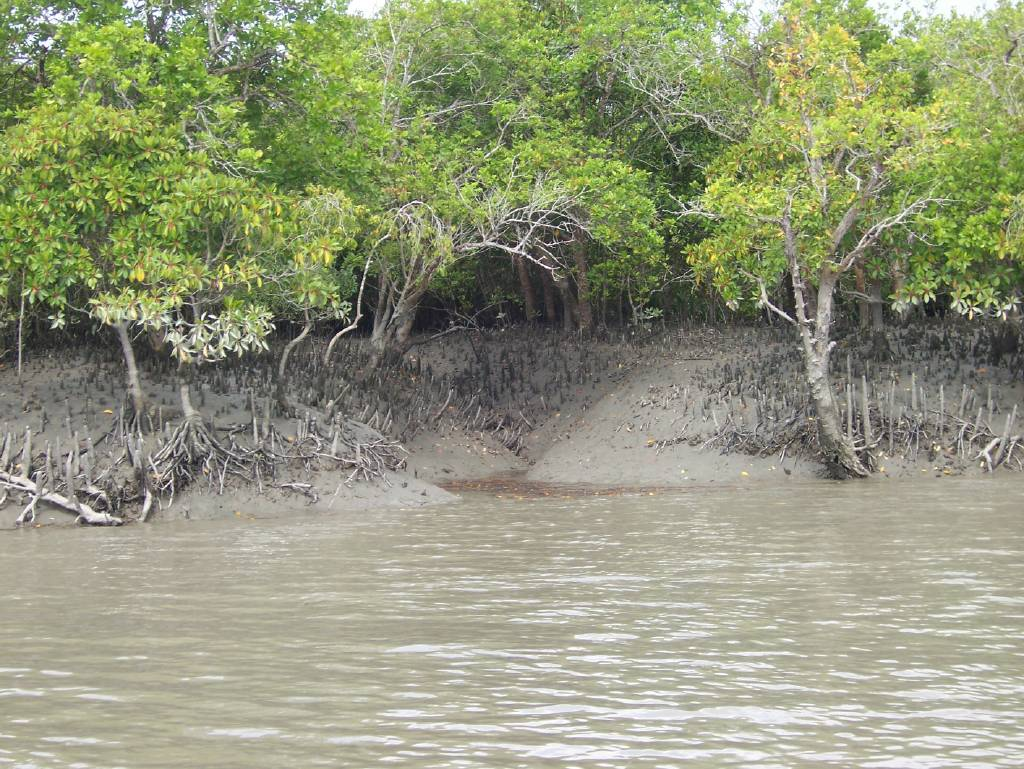
Typical mangrove forest scene in the Sundarbans

Mangroves in this delta region are not dominated by members of the Rhizophoraceae family, probably because of the low salinity caused by the inflow of river water. The commonest species are "sundri" (Heritiera fomes), interspersed with "gewa" (Excoecaria agallocha) and "passur" (Xylocarpus mekongensis), with "kankra" (Bruguiera gymnorhiza) occurring in areas subject to more frequent flooding. There is an understory of "shingra" (Cynometra ramiflora) where, soils are drier, "amur" (Aglaia cucullata) in wetter areas and goran (Ceriops decandra) where the salinity is higher. Nypa palm (Nypa fruticans) is widespread along drainage channels. The most abundant plants on the forest floor were the mangrove date palm (Phoenix paludosa), holly-leaved acanthus (Acanthus ilicifolius), Sarcolobus globosus and Derris trifoliata.

== Fauna ==
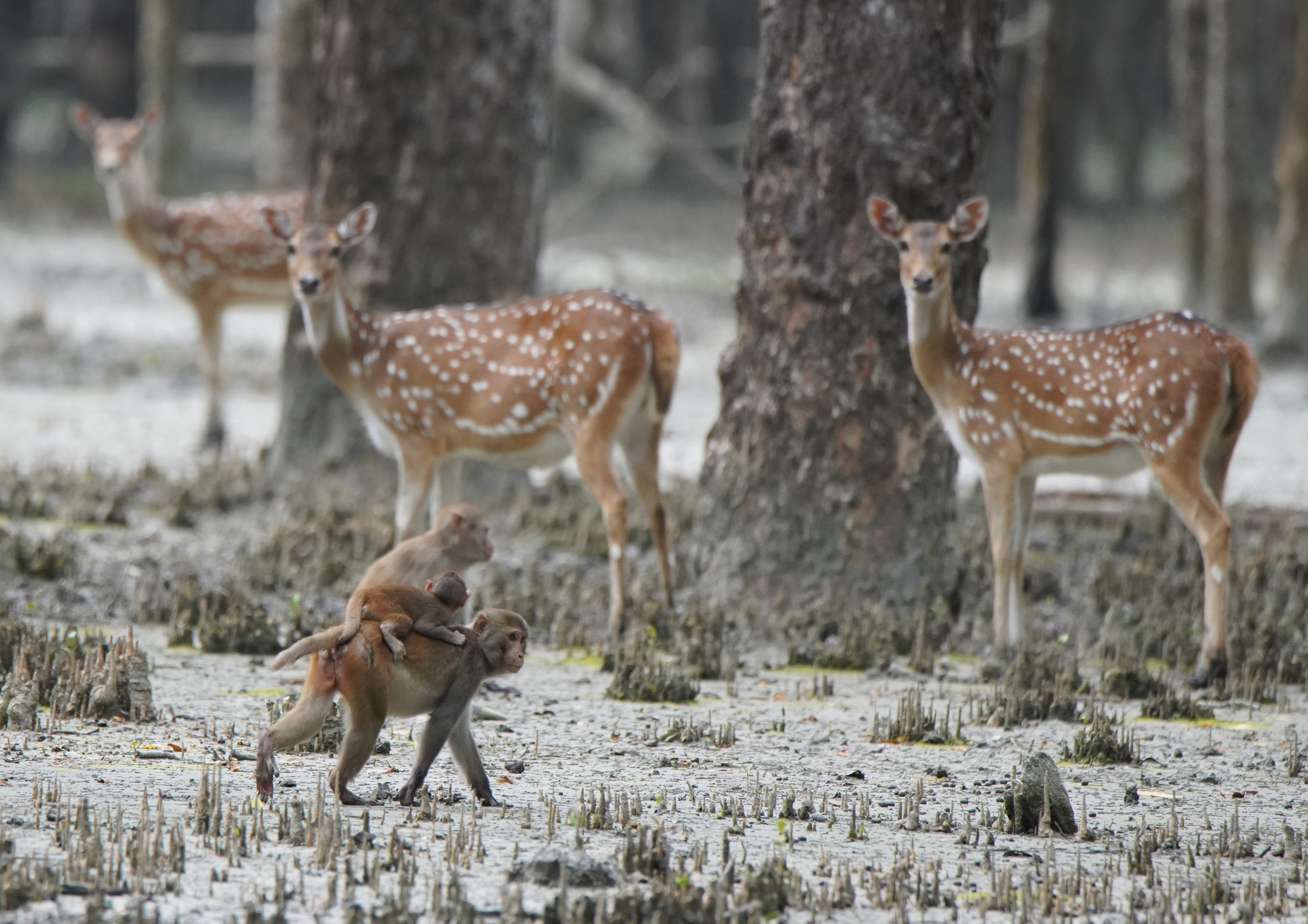
Spotted deers and monkeys in the Sundarbans

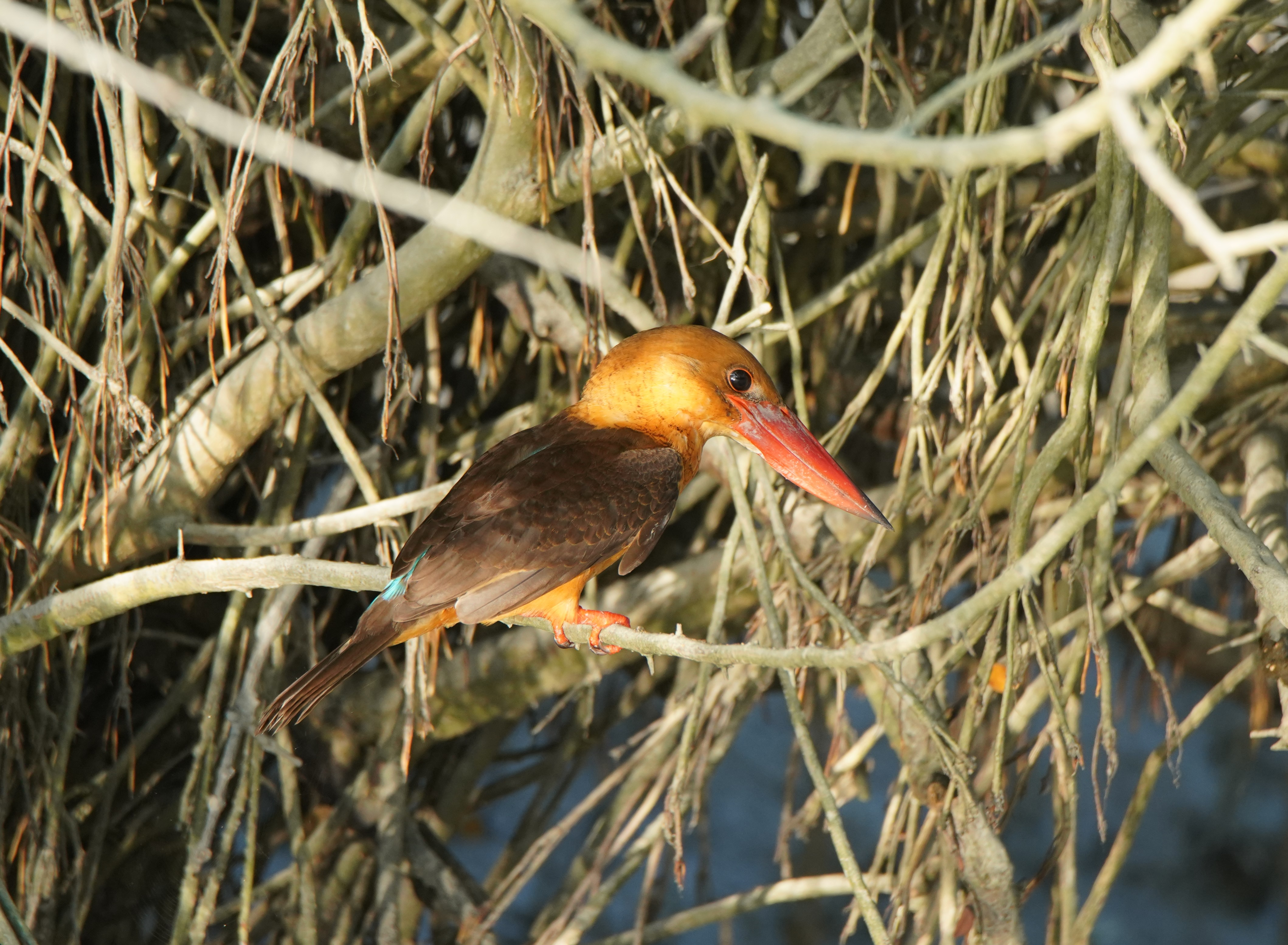
Bird in the sanctuary

There are more than forty species of mammal present in this and the adjoining Sundarbans West Wildlife Sanctuary and Sundarbans South Wildlife Sanctuary. The rhesus macaque (Macaca mulatta) is plentiful and is the only primate in the area. Bengal tigers are also present; they have a reputation as being man-eaters, but their chief prey is the spotted deer (Axis axis) and the wild boar (Sus scrofa). There are three species of wild cat, the leopard cat (Prionailurus bengalensis), the fishing cat (Prionailurus viverrinus) and the jungle cat (Felis chaus). Also present are three species of otter, one of which, the smooth-coated otter (Lutrogale perspicillata), has been domesticated by local fishermen. The South Asian river dolphin (Platanista gangetica) inhabits some of the larger water channels.

Birds are plentiful with over 270 having been recorded in the area including 38 species of raptor, 95 species of waterfowl and 9 of kingfisher. On the coast there are gulls and terns, on the mudbanks waders are plentiful and various forest birds are found among the trees. Some of the birds recorded such as the masked finfoot (Heliopais personatus) and the white-rumped vulture (Gyps bengalensis) are threatened globally. The greater spotted eagle (Clanga clanga) overwinters here but the lesser adjutant (Leptoptilos javanicus) is a resident but uncommon species as is the mangrove pitta (Pitta megarhyncha) and the black-headed ibis (Threskiornis melanocephalus). The streak-breasted woodpecker (Picus viridanus) is at the western end of its range here. Other notable birds include the great stone-curlew (Esacus recurvirostris) and the buffy fish owl (Bubo ketupu).

45 species of reptile have been recorded, but the mugger crocodile (Crocodylus palustris), has been overhunted and is no longer present, and the saltwater crocodile (Crocodylus porosus) is much reduced in numbers. There are 11 species of amphibian and more than 120 species of fish. Crustaceans are abundant, especially fiddler crabs and mud crabs, as well as lobsters, shrimps and prawns.

== Management ==
The reserve is managed from administrative offices at Katka and Tiger Point. Certain activities are prohibited in the reserve; settlement, the cultivation of land, keeping livestock, damaging the vegetation, hunting and lighting fires. Management is directed at conservation of the tigers and other wildlife as a part of forest management.

In the long-term, as sediment is deposited, the main channels in the Ganges Delta are migrating eastwards. As other channels silt up, the reserve is becoming more saline and a gradual replacement of Heritiera fomes by Excoecaria agallocha may occur. Oil spills, such as happened in December 2014, are a threat to the aquatic life and the forest itself. Tropical cyclones and tsunamis can cause great damage to this low-lying area, and wood-cutting and unauthorised hunting and fishing take place. The landfall of Cyclone Sidr in 2007 damaged around 40% of the area.

== See also ==
- Sangu Matamuhari
- Sundarbans West Wildlife Sanctuary
- Sundarbans South Wildlife Sanctuary
