= Sundarbans West Wildlife Sanctuary =

Animal sanctuary in Bangladesh

Coordinates: 21.789°N 89.193°E

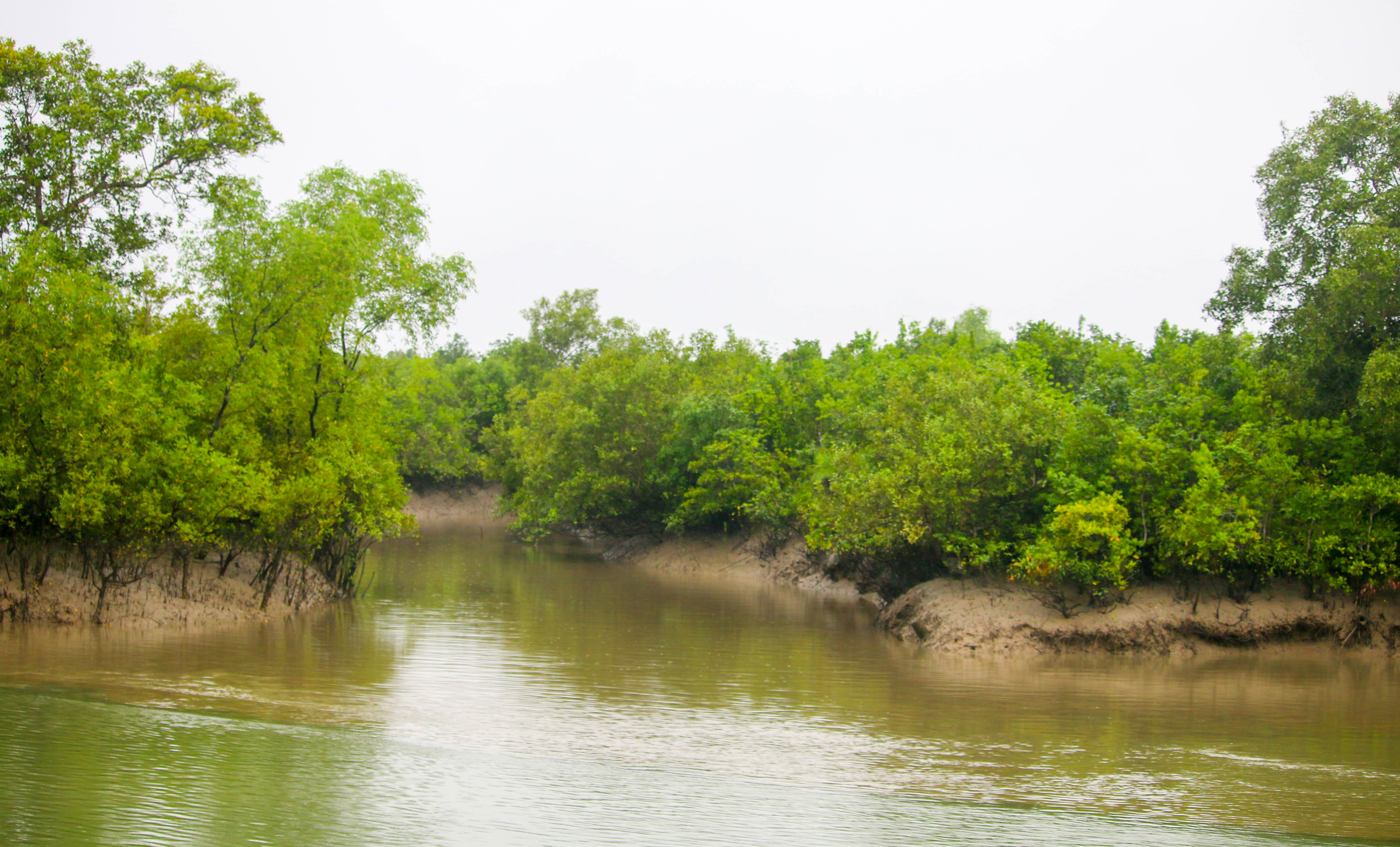
River in the Sundarbans

Sundarbans West Wildlife Sanctuary is a UNESCO World Heritage Site and animal sanctuary in Bangladesh. The area of the reserve covers 715 km^{2}. It is part of the larger Sundarbans region, one of the largest mangroveforests in the world. It is formed at the unified delta of the Ganges, Brahmaputra and Meghna rivers on the Bay of Bengal. The total area of the entire Sundarbans is about one million ha, 60% of which is found in Bangladesh, with the remaining 40% in India. The region is divided by the Raimangal River. Within the Bangladeshi area of Sundarbans, there are three wildlife sanctuaries: Sundarbans East, Sundarbans South, and Sundarbans West.

== Environment ==
The region is intersected by a complex network of tidal waterways, mud flats and small islands of salt tolerant mangrove forests. The area is flooded with brackish water during high tides which mix with freshwater from inland rivers.

== Flora ==
The region supports several mangroves, including sparse stands of gewa (Excoecaria agallocha) and dense stands of goran (Ceriops tagal), with discontinuous patches of hantal palm (Phoenix paludosa) on drier ground, river banks and levees.

== Fauna ==
The fauna of the sanctuary is very diverse with some 40 species of mammals, 260 species of birds and 35 species of reptiles. The greatest of these being the Bengal tiger of which an estimated 120 remain in the Bangladesh Sundarbans. Other large mammals are wild boar, chital, fishing cat, oriental small-clawed otter and rhesus monkey. Five species of marine turtles frequent the coastal zone and three endangered reptiles are present - the estuarine crocodile, Indian rock python & the king cobra.
