= Top dying disease =

Plant disease

Top dying disease is a disease that affects Heritiera fomes, a species of mangrove tree known as "sundri", a characteristic tree of the estuarine complex of the Ganges–Brahmaputra Delta in Bangladesh and West Bengal. Although an increase in certain trace elements in the sediment deposited where these trees grow may be a factor in the incidence of the disease, its cause has not been fully established.

== History ==
About 63% of the trees growing in the Sundarbans are Heritiera fomes. Sporadic instances of top dying disease had been noticed in these trees earlier in the twentieth century but the disease became more acute and extensive after about 1970. An inventory of trees in the Sundarbans in 1985 recorded 45 million diseased trees with nearly half of these having more than half their crown affected. No causal agent has been discovered and the dieback is thought to be the result of stressful conditions, perhaps caused by an increase in the heavy metal concentration of the sediment deposited in the delta.

== Symptoms ==
The uppermost parts of the tree are affected first with loss of leaves and dieback of branches in the crown. One or more knot-like swellings may develop on affected branches. Lower branches are progressively affected over time. Wood-boring insects and fungi invade the diseased wood and the tree eventually dies.
