= Sundarbans =

Mangrove forest in the Bay of Bengal

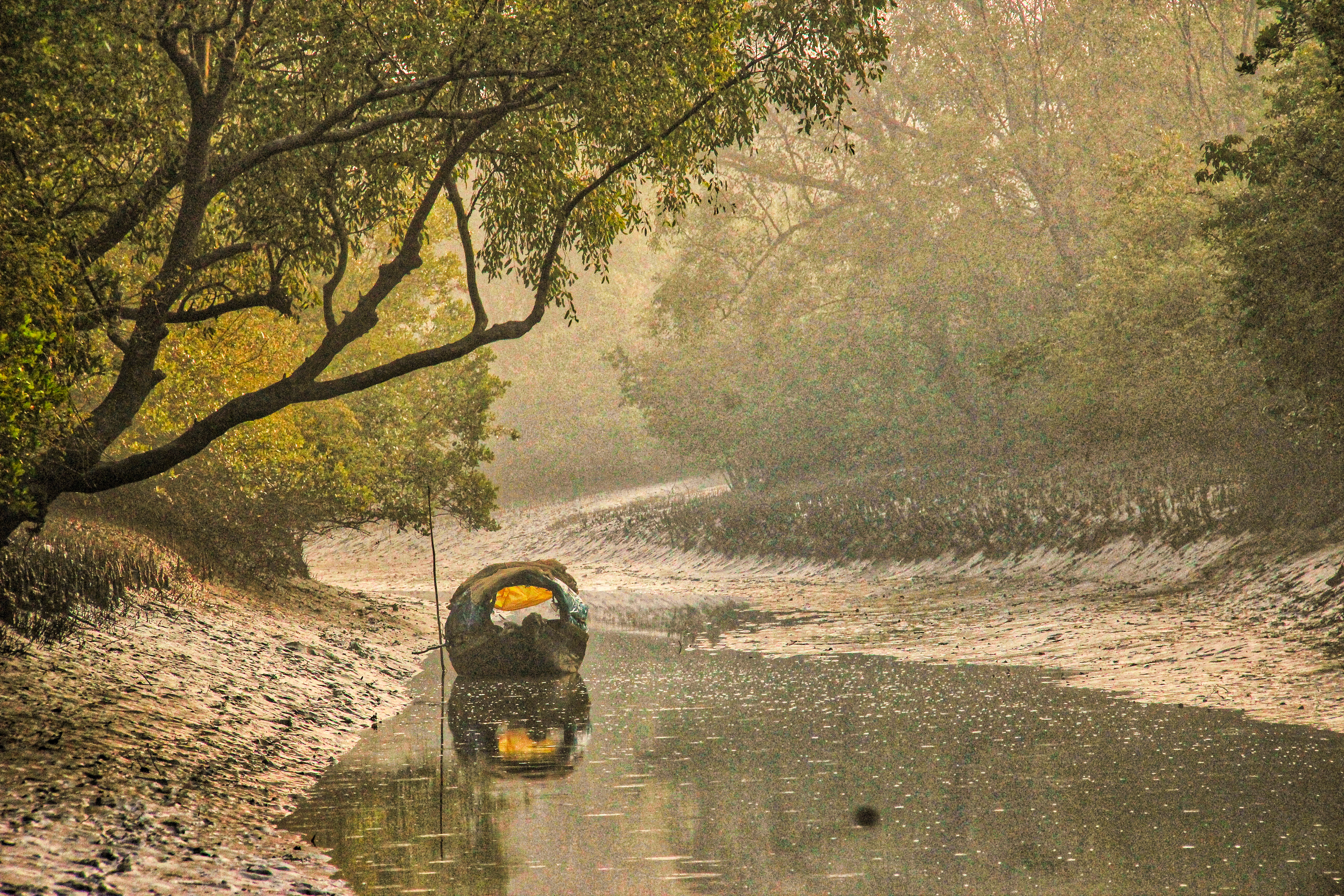
- Inside the Sundarbans

- Location within South Asia
- Location: Khulna Division, Bangladesh; Presidency division, West Bengal, India
- Nearest city: Basirhat; Diamond Harbour; Haldia; Kolkata; Khulna; Bagerhat; Patuakhali; Barguna; Satkhira; Mongla
- Coordinates: 21°45′N 88°45′E
- Area: 10,277 km^{2} (3,968 sq mi)10,277 km^{2} (3,968 sq mi)
- Governing body: Government of Bangladesh; (India) Government of West Bengal

UNESCO World Heritage Site
- Official name: Sundarbans National Park
- Location: Presidency division, West Bengal, India
- Includes: Sundarbans National Park
- Criteria: Natural: (ix)(x)
- Reference: 452
- Inscription: 1987 (11th Session)
- Area: 133,010 ha (513.6 sq mi)
- Coordinates: 21°56′42″N 88°53′45″E

UNESCO World Heritage Site
- Official name: The Sundarbans
- Location: Khulna Division, Bangladesh
- Includes: Sundarbans West Wildlife Sanctuary; Sundarbans South Sanctuary; Sundarbans East Sanctuary
- Criteria: Natural: (ix)(x)
- Reference: 798
- Inscription: 1997 (21st Session)
- Area: 139,500 ha (539 sq mi)
- Coordinates: 21°57′N 89°11′E

Ramsar Wetland
- Official name: Sundarbans Reserved Forest
- Designated: 21 May 1992
- Reference no.: 560

Ramsar Wetland
- Official name: Sundarban Wetland
- Designated: 30 January 2019
- Reference no.: 2370

Sundarbans (Note: /sʌnˈdɑːrbənz/; Bengali: সুন্দরবন; pronounced [ˈʃundorbon], ISO: śundōrbōn) is a mangrove forest area in the Ganges Delta formed by the confluence of the Ganges, Brahmaputra and Meghna Rivers in the Bay of Bengal. It spans the area from the Hooghly River in India's state of West Bengal to the Baleswar River in Bangladesh's Khulna Division. It comprises closed and open mangrove forests, land used for agricultural purpose, mudflats and barren land, and is intersected by multiple tidal streams and channels. Spread across 10,277 km^{2} (3,968 sq mi), it is the world's largest mangrove forest. It covers over 6,017 km^{2} (2,323 sq mi) in Bangladesh's Khulna Division. In West Bengal's Presidency division, they extend over 4,260 km^{2} (1,640 sq mi) in the South 24 Parganas and North 24 Parganas districts. Four protected areas in the Sundarbans are enlisted as UNESCO World Heritage Sites, viz. Sundarbans West, Sundarbans South, Sundarbans East in Bangladesh and Sundarbans National Park in India. The Indian Sundarbans were considered endangered in a 2020 assessment under the IUCN Red List of Ecosystems framework. The most abundant tree species are sundri (Heritiera fomes) and gewa (Excoecaria agallocha). The forests provide habitat to 453 fauna wildlife, including 290 bird, 120 fish, 42 mammal, 35 reptile and eight amphibian species. Despite a total ban on all killing or capture of wildlife other than fish and some invertebrates, there has been a consistent pattern of depleted biodiversity or loss of species in the 20th century, with the ecological quality of the forest declining.

The Sundarbans face threats from both natural events and human activities. In 2007, the landfall of Cyclone Sidr damaged around 40% of the Sundarbans. The forest is also suffering from increased salinity caused by sea level rise due to effects of climate change and reduced freshwater supply. In May 2009, Cyclone Aila devastated the Sundarbans with massive casualties. At least 100,000 people were affected by this cyclone. Climate change is expected to continue to negatively affect both natural systems and human populations in the region, resulting in further ecosystem degradation and climate migration. Experts examining the region recommend further focus on mangrove restoration and management and advocating for adaptation of human populations, through processes like managed retreat and investments in resilient infrastructure. The coal-fired Rampal Power Station is anticipated to further damage this unique mangrove forest according to a 2016 report by UNESCO.

== Etymology ==
The literal meaning of Sundarbans (Bengali: সুন্দরবন, romanized: Sundôrbôn) is "beautiful forest". Alternatively, it was proposed that the name is a corruption of Samudraban, Shomudrobôn ("Sea Forest"), or Chandra-bandhe, the name of a tribe. However, the likely origin of the word is Sundari or Sundri, the local name of the mangrove species Heritiera fomes abundant in the area.

== History ==
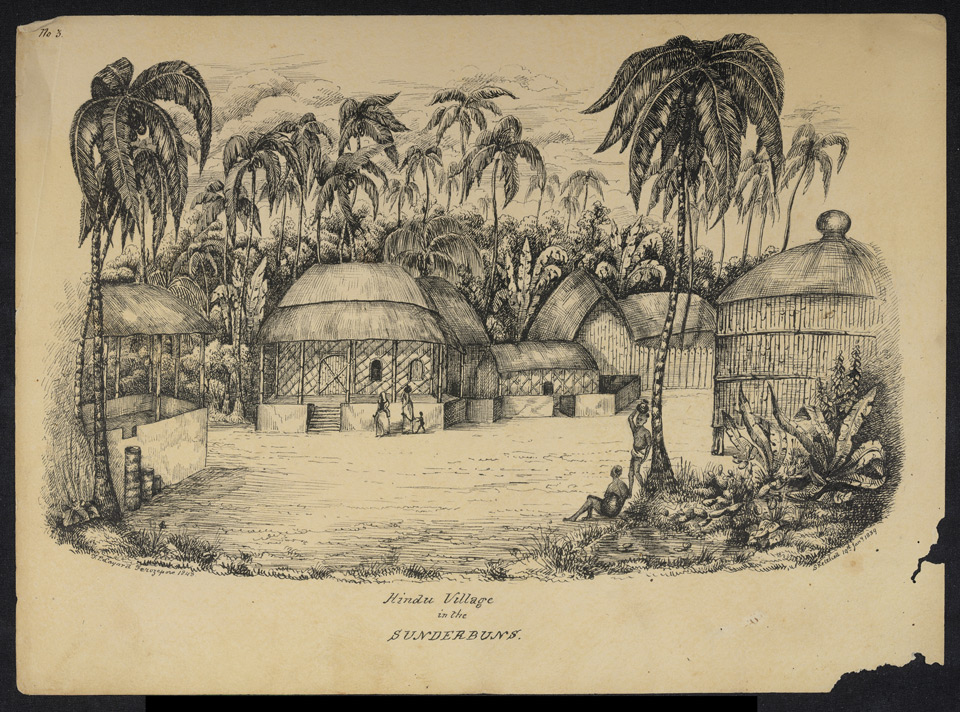
Village in a clearing of the Sundarbans. Drawing by Frederic Peter Layard after an original sketch of 1839

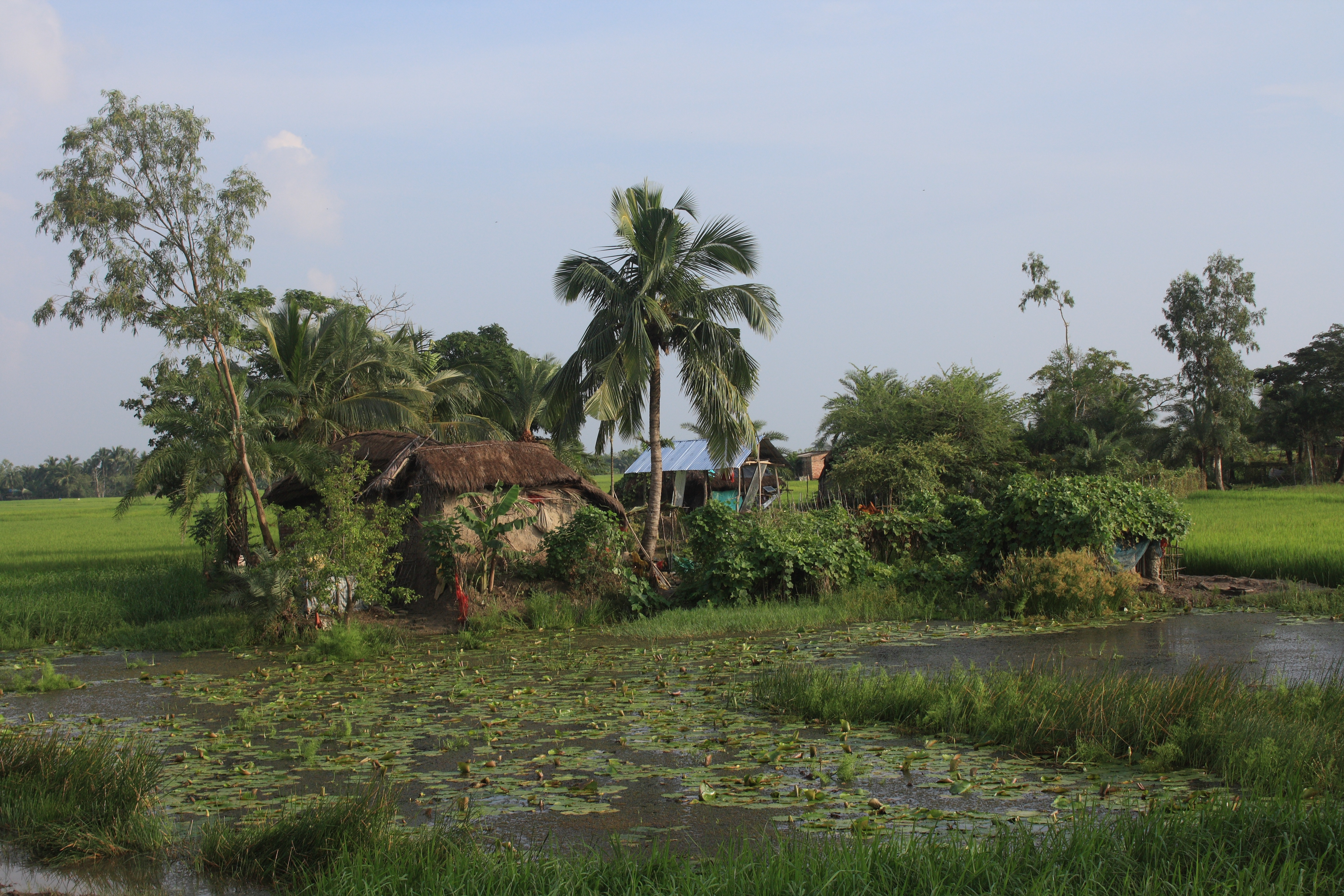
Farm among paddy fields in the Sundarbans, 2010

The history of human settlement in the Sundarbans area can be traced back to Mauryan era (4th-2nd century BCE). A ruin of an abandoned city was found in the Baghmara Forest Block that is attributed to Chand Sadagar, a pre-Mauryan semi-historical figure in Bengali folklore. Archaeological excavation at Kapilmuni, Paikgacha Upazilla, north of the Sundarbans in Bangladesh, revealed ruins of urban settlement dating back to the early middle ages. During the Mughal period, forest tracts were leased out by the local rulers for establishing settlements. In 1757, The British East India Company obtained proprietary rights over Sundarbans from the Mughal Emperor Alamgir II and completed mapping the area in 1764. However, systematic forest management started a century later. The first Forest Management Division to have jurisdiction over the Sundarbans was established in 1869. In 1875 a large portion of the mangrove forests was declared as reserved forests under the Indian Forest Act of 1865 (Act VIII of 1865). The remaining portions of the forests were declared a reserve forest the following year and the forest, which was so far administered by the civil administration district, was placed under the control of the Forest Department. A Forest Division, which is the basic forest management and administration unit, was created in 1879 with the headquarters in today Khulna, Bangladesh. The first management plan was written for the period 1893–1898.

== Geography ==
The Sundarban forest lies in the vast delta on the Bay of Bengal formed by the super-confluence of the Hooghly, Padma (both are distributaries of Ganges), Brahmaputra and Meghna rivers across southern Bangladesh. The seasonally flooded Sundarbans freshwater swamp forest lies inland from the mangrove forests on the coastal fringe. The forest covers 10,277 km^{2} (3,968 mi^{2}) of which about 6,517 km^{2} (2,516 mi^{2}) are in Bangladesh. The Indian part of Sundarbans is estimated to be about 4,260 km^{2} (1,640 mi^{2}), of which about 1,700 km^{2} (660 mi^{2}) is occupied by water bodies in the forms of river, canals and creeks of width varying from a few metres to several kilometres.

The Sundarbans is intersected by a complex network of tidal waterways, mudflats and small islands of salt-tolerant mangrove forests. The interconnected network of waterways makes almost every corner of the forest accessible by boat. The area is known for the Bengal tiger (Panthera tigris), as well as numerous fauna including species of birds, chital, crocodiles and snakes. The fertile soils of the delta have been subject to intensive human use for centuries, and the ecoregion has been mostly converted to intensive agriculture, with few enclaves of forest remaining. The remaining forests, taken together with the Sundarbans mangroves, are important habitat for the endangered tiger. Additionally, the mangrove species of the Sundarbans serve a vital ecological role, forming a natural barrier that shields millions of residents in and around Kolkata, Khulna, and the Port of Mongla from cyclone-induced flooding.. It also protects from tsunami and soil erosion for the coastal population.

=== Physiography ===
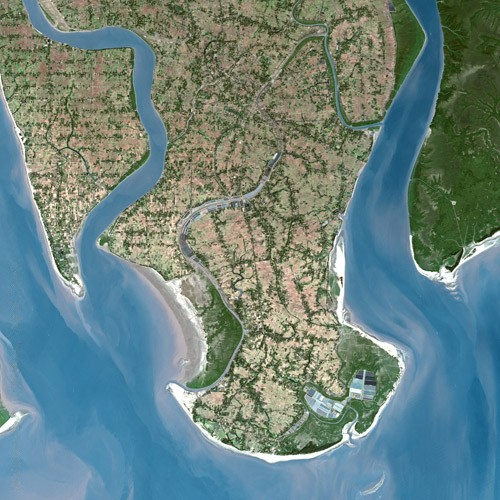
SPOT satellite image of Sundarbans, released by CNES

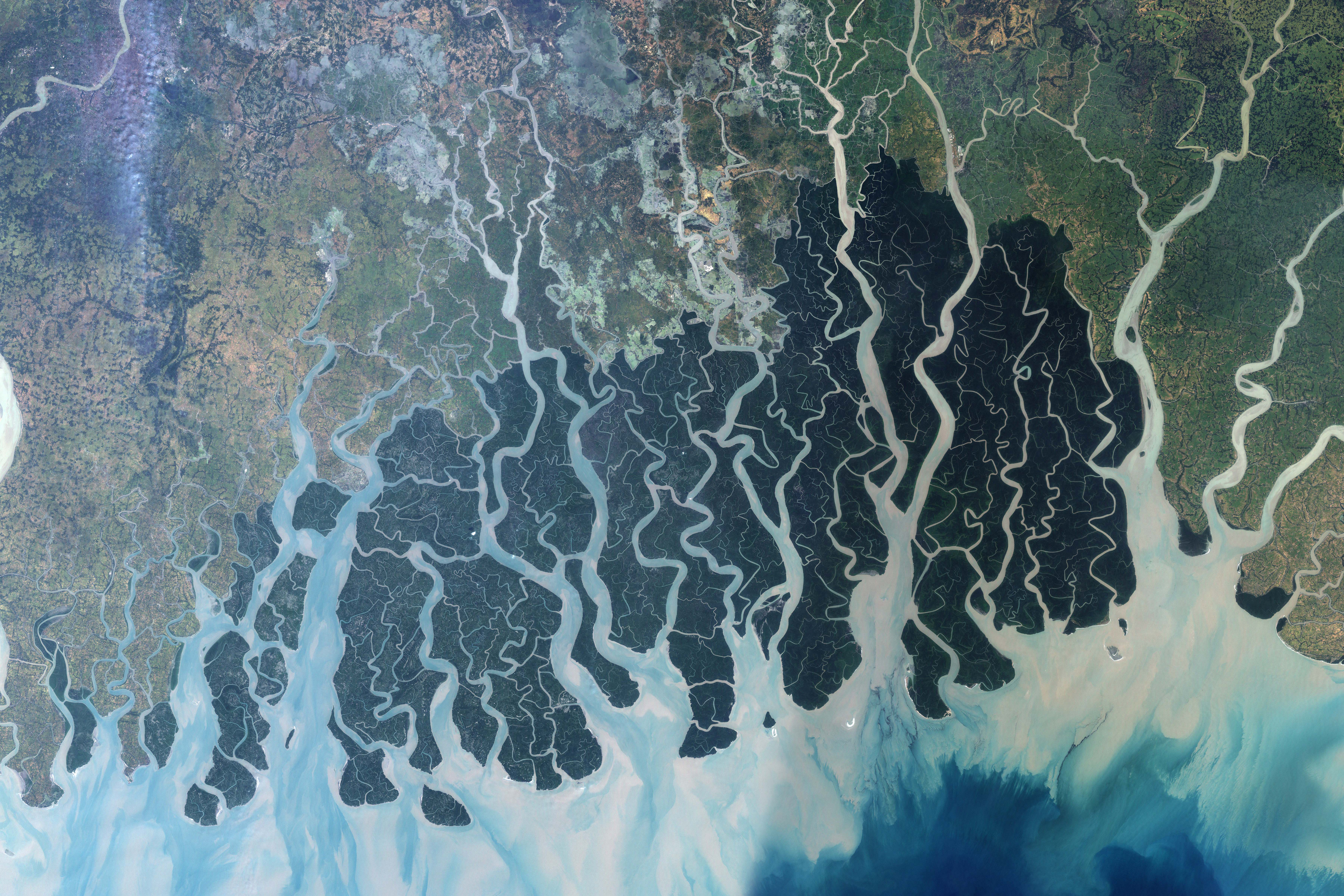
Landsat 7 image of Sundarbans, released by NASA Earth Observatory

The mangrove-dominated Ganges Delta – the Sundarbans – is a complex ecosystem comprising one of the three largest single tracts of mangrove forests of the world. The larger part is situated in Bangladesh, a smaller portion of it lies in India. The Indian part of the forest is estimated to be about 40 percent, while the Bangladeshi part is 60 percent. To the south the forest meets the Bay of Bengal; to the east it is bordered by the Baleswar River and to the north there is a sharp interface with intensively cultivated land. The natural drainage in the upstream areas, other than the main river channels, is everywhere impeded by extensive embankments and polders. In the early 19th century, the Sundarbans was measured to cover about 16,700 km^{2} (6,400 sq mi). Now it has dwindled into about one-third of its original size. The total land area today is 4,143 km^{2} (1,600 mi^{2}), including exposed sandbars with a total area of 42 km^{2} (16 sq mi); the remaining water area of 1,874 km^{2} (724 sq mi) encompasses rivers, small streams and canals. Rivers in the Sundarbans are meeting places of salt water and freshwater. Thus, it is a region of transition between the freshwater of the rivers originating from the Ganges and the saline water of the Bay of Bengal.

The Sundarbans along the Bay of Bengal has evolved over the millennia through natural deposition of upstream sediments accompanied by intertidal segregation. The physiography is dominated by deltaic formations that include innumerable drainage lines associated with surface and subaqueous levees, splays and tidal flats. There are also marginal marshes above mean tide level, tidal sandbars and islands with their networks of tidal channels, subaqueous distal bars and proto-delta clays and silt sediments. The Sundarbans' floor varies from 0.9 to 2.11 m (3.0 to 6.9 ft) above sea level.

Biotic factors here play a significant role in physical coastal evolution, and for wildlife a variety of habitats have developed which include beaches, estuaries, permanent and semi-permanent swamps, tidal flats, tidal creeks, coastal dunes, back dunes and levees. The mangrove vegetation itself assists in the formation of new landmass and the intertidal vegetation plays a significant role in swamp morphology. The activities of mangrove fauna in the intertidal mudflats develop micromorphological features that trap and hold sediments to create a substratum for mangrove seeds. The morphology and evolution of the aeolian dunes is controlled by an abundance of xerophytic and halophytic plants. Creepers, grasses and sedges stabilise sand dunes and uncompacted sediments. The Sunderbans mudflats (Banerjee, 1998) are found at the estuary and on the deltaic islands where low velocity of river and tidal current occurs. The flats are exposed in low tides and submerged in high tides, thus being changed morphologically even in one tidal cycle. The tides are so large that approximately one third of the land disappears and reappears every day.

=== Ecoregions ===
Sundarbans features two ecoregions — "Sundarbans freshwater swamp forests" (IM0162) and "Sundarbans mangroves" (IM1406).

==== Sundarbans freshwater swamp forests ====
The Sundarbans freshwater swamp forests are a tropical moist broadleaf forest ecoregion of Bangladesh and India. It represents the brackish swamp forests that lie behind the Sundarbans Mangroves, where the salinity is more pronounced. The freshwater ecoregion is an area where the water is only slightly brackish and becomes quite fresh during the rainy season, when the freshwater plumes from the Ganges and the Brahmaputra rivers push the intruding salt water out and bring a deposit of silt. It covers 14,600 square kilometres (5,600 sq mi) of the vast Ganges-Brahmaputra Delta, finishing at the mouth of the Bay of Bengal from the northern part of Khulna District and the southern part of North 24 Parganas district in the Indian state of West Bengal. The Sundarbans freshwater swamp forests lie between the upland Lower Gangetic plains moist deciduous forests and the brackish-water Sundarbans mangroves bordering the Bay of Bengal.

A victim of large-scale clearing and settlement to support one of the densest human populations in Asia, this ecoregion is under a great threat of extinction. Hundreds of years of habitation and exploitation have exacted a heavy toll on this ecoregion's habitat and biodiversity. There are two protected areas – Narendrapur (110 km^{2}) and Ata Danga Baor (20 km^{2}) that cover a mere 130 km^{2} of the ecoregion. Habitat loss in this ecoregion is so extensive, and the remaining habitat is so fragmented, that it is difficult to ascertain the composition of the original vegetation of this ecoregion. According to Champion and Seth (1968), the freshwater swamp forests are characterised by Heritiera minor, Xylocarpus molluccensis, Bruguiera conjugata, Sonneratia apetala, Avicennia officinalis, and Sonneratia caseolaris, with Pandanus tectorius, Hibiscus tiliaceus, and Nipa fruticans along the fringing banks.

==== Sundarbans Mangroves ====
Ecoregion IM406, also known as the Sundarbans Mangroves ecoregion

The Sundarbans Mangroves ecoregion on the coast forms the seaward fringe of the delta and is the world's largest mangrove ecosystem, with 20,400 square kilometres (7,900 sq mi) of an area covered. The dominant mangrove species Heritiera fomes is locally known as sundri or sundari. Mangrove forests are not home to a great variety of plants. They have a thick canopy, and the undergrowth is mostly seedlings of the mangrove trees. Besides the sundari, other tree species in the forest include Avicennia, Xylocarpus mekongensis, Xylocarpus granatum, Sonneratia apetala, Bruguiera gymnorhiza, Ceriops decandra, Aegiceras corniculatum, Rhizophora mucronata, and Nypa fruticans palms. Twenty-six of the fifty broad mangrove species found in the world grow well in the Sundarbans. The commonly identifiable vegetation types in the dense Sundarbans mangrove forests are salt water mixed forest, mangrove scrub, brackish water mixed forest, littoral forest, wet forest and wet alluvial grass forests. The Bangladesh mangrove vegetation of the Sundarbans differs greatly from other non-deltaic coastal mangrove forests and upland forests associations. Unlike the former, the Rhizophoraceae are of minor importance.

=== Ecological succession ===
Ecological succession is generally defined as the successive occupation of a site by different plant communities. In an accreting mudflats the outer community along the sequence represents the pioneer community which is gradually replaced by the next community representing the seral stages and finally by a climax community typical of the climatic zone. Robert Scott Troup suggested that succession began in the newly accreted land created by fresh deposits of eroded soil. The pioneer vegetation on these newly accreted sites is Sonneratia, followed by Avicennia and Nypa. As the ground is elevated as a result of soil deposition, other trees make their appearance. The most prevalent, though one of the late species to appear, is Excoecaria. As the level of land rises through accretion and the land is only occasionally flooded by tides, Heritiera fomes begins to appear.

== Flora and fauna ==
=== Flora ===
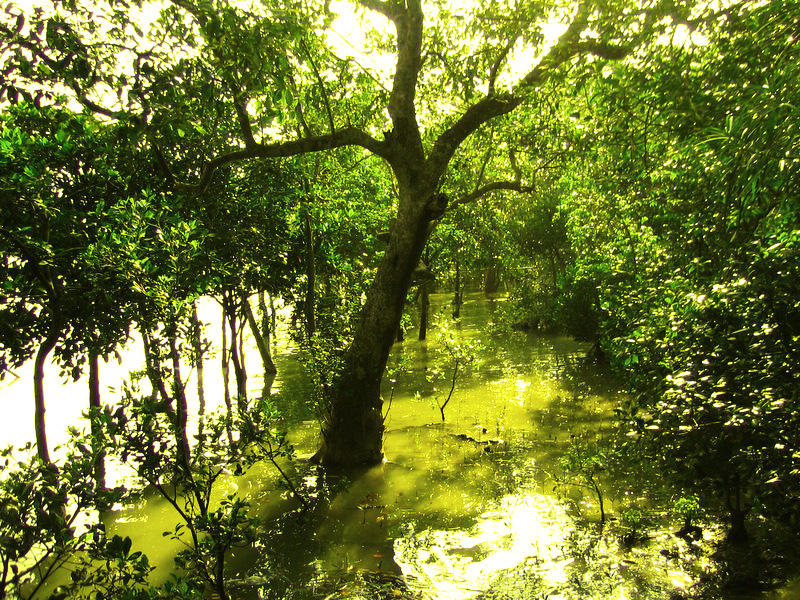
Sundari tree (Heritiera littoralis)

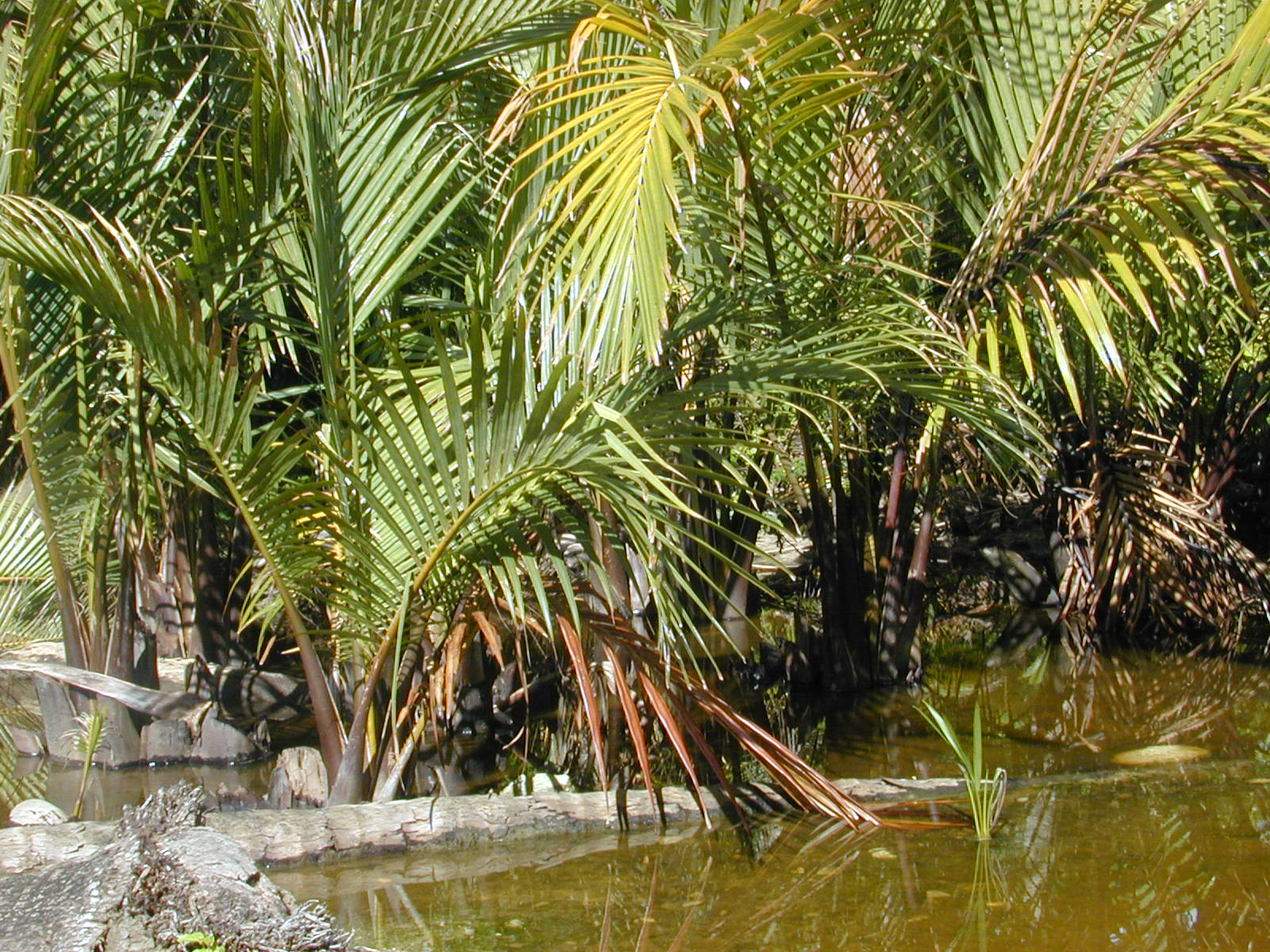
Golpata (Nypa fruticans)

A total of 245 genera and 334 plant species were recorded by David Prain in 1903. While most of the mangroves in other parts of the world are characterised by members of the Rhizophoraceae, Avicenneaceae or Combretaceae, the mangroves of Bangladesh are dominated by the Malvaceae and Euphorbiaceae.

The Sundarbans flora is characterised by the abundance of sundari (Heritiera fomes), gewa (Excoecaria agallocha), goran (Ceriops decandra) and keora (Sonneratia apetala) all of which occur prominently throughout the area. The characteristic tree of the forest is the sundari (Heritiera littoralis), from which the name of the forest had probably been derived. It yields a hard wood, used for building houses and making boats, furniture and other things. New forest accretions is often conspicuously dominated by keora (Sonneratia apetala) and tidal forests. It is an indicator species for newly accreted mudbanks and is an important species for wildlife, especially spotted deer (Axis axis). There is abundance of dhundul or passur (Xylocarpus granatum) and kankra (Bruguiera gymnorhiza) though distribution is discontinuous. Among palms, Poresia coaractata, Myriostachya wightiana and golpata (Nypa fruticans), and among grasses spear grass (Imperata cylindrica) and khagra (Phragmites karka) are well distributed.

The varieties of the forests that exist in Sundarbans include mangrove scrub, littoral forest, saltwater mixed forest, brackish water mixed forest and swamp forest. Besides the forest, there are extensive areas of brackish water and freshwater marshes, intertidal mudflats, sandflats, sand dunes with typical dune vegetation, open grassland on sandy soils and raised areas supporting a variety of terrestrial shrubs and trees. Since Prain's report there have been considerable changes in the status of various mangrove species and taxonomic revision of the man-grove flora. However, very little exploration of the botanical nature of the Sundarbans has been made to keep up with these changes. Differences in vegetation have been explained in terms of freshwater and low salinity influences in the Northeast and variations in drainage and siltation. The Sundarbans has been classified as a moist tropical forest demonstrating a whole mosaic of seres, comprising primary colonisation on new accretions to more mature beach forests. Historically vegetation types have been recognised in broad correlation with varying degrees of water salinity, freshwater flushing and physiography.

=== Fauna ===
The Sundarbans provides a unique ecosystem and a rich wildlife habitat. According to the 2015 tiger census in Bangladesh, and the 2011 tiger census in India, the Sundarbans have about 180 tigers (106 in Bangladesh and 74 in India). Earlier estimates, based on counting unique pugmarks, were much higher. The more recent counts have used camera traps, an improved methodology that yields more accurate results. Tiger attacks were historically common in the area, and are still frequent in the Sundarbans, with around 40 people killed in 2000–2010.

Most importantly, mangroves are a transition from the marine to freshwater and terrestrial systems, and provide critical habitat for numerous species of small fish, crabs, shrimps and other crustaceans that adapt to feed and shelter, and reproduce among the tangled mass of roots, known as pneumatophores, which grow upward from the anaerobic mud to get the supply of oxygen. A 1991 study has revealed that the Indian part of the Sundarbans supports diverse biological resources including at least 150 species of commercially important fish, 270 species of birds, 42 species of mammals, 35 reptiles and 8 amphibian species, although new ones are being discovered. This represents a significant proportion of the species present in Bangladesh (i.e. about 30% of the reptiles, 37% the birds and 34% of the mammals) and includes many species which are now extinct elsewhere in the country. Two amphibians, 14 reptiles, 25 aves and five mammals are endangered. The Sundarbans is an important wintering area for migrant water birds and is an area suitable for watching and studying avifauna.

The management of wildlife is restricted to, firstly, the protection of fauna from poaching, and, secondly, designation of some areas as wildlife sanctuaries where no extraction of forest produce is allowed and where the wildlife face few disturbances. Although the fauna of Bangladesh have diminished in recent times and the Sundarbans has not been spared from this decline, the mangrove forest retains several good wildlife habitats and their associated fauna. Of these, the tiger and dolphin are target species for planning wildlife management and tourism development. There are high profile and vulnerable mammals living in two contrasting environments, and their statuses and management are strong indicators of the general condition and management of wildlife. Some species are protected by legislation, notably by the Bangladesh Wildlife (Preservation) Order, 1973 (P.O. 23 of 1973).

==== Mammals ====
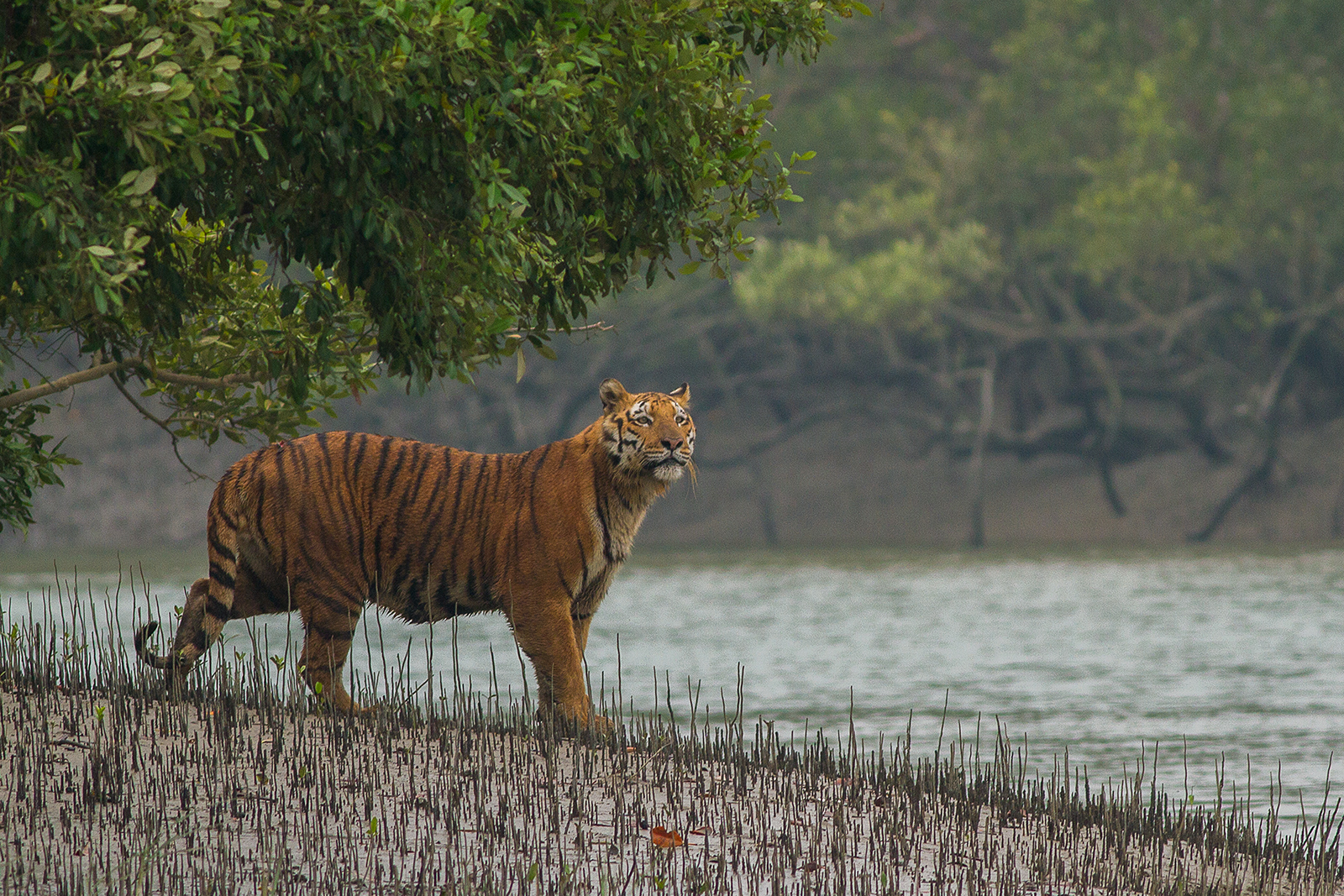
A Bengal tiger in the Sundarbans

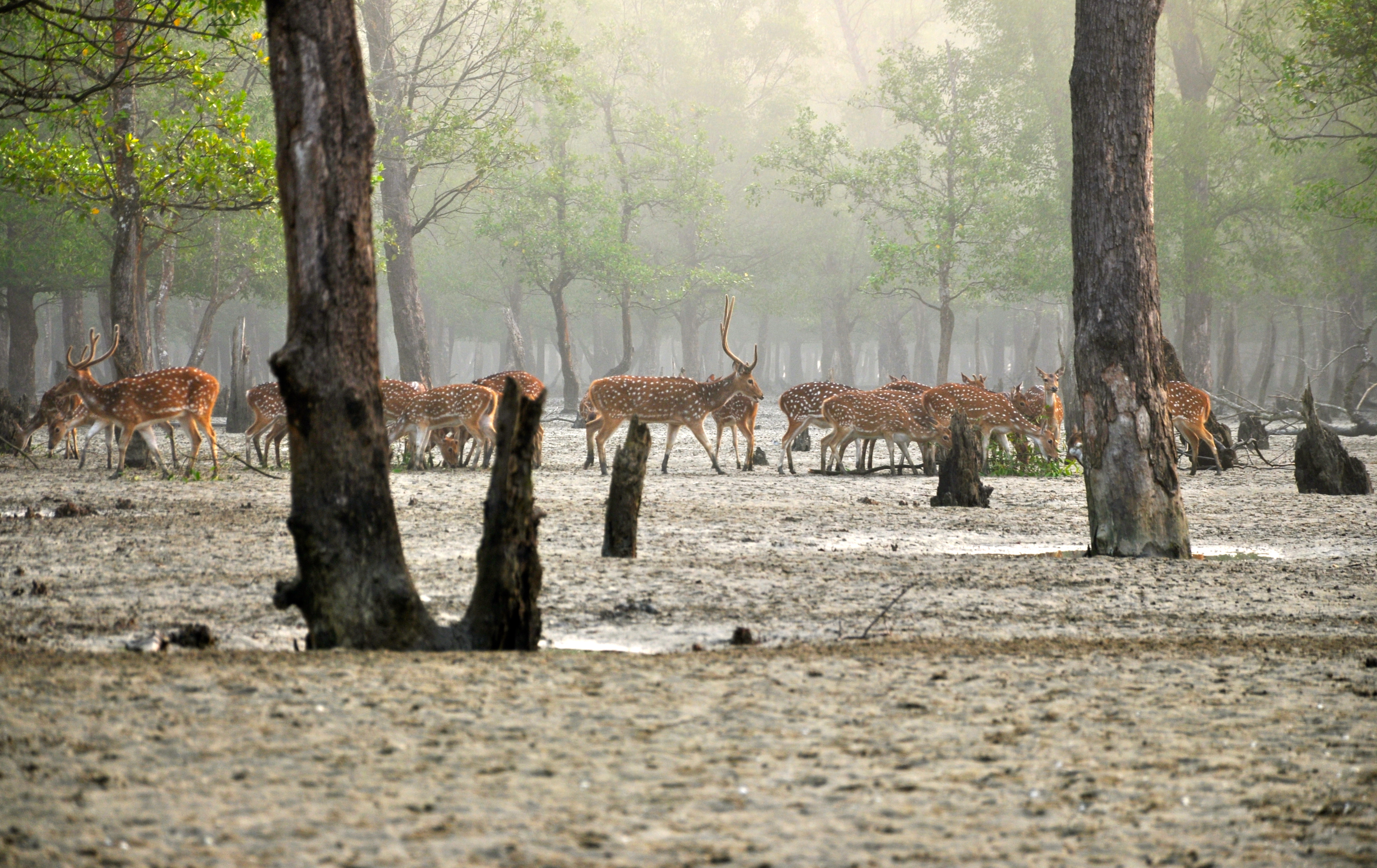
Chital deer (Axis axis)

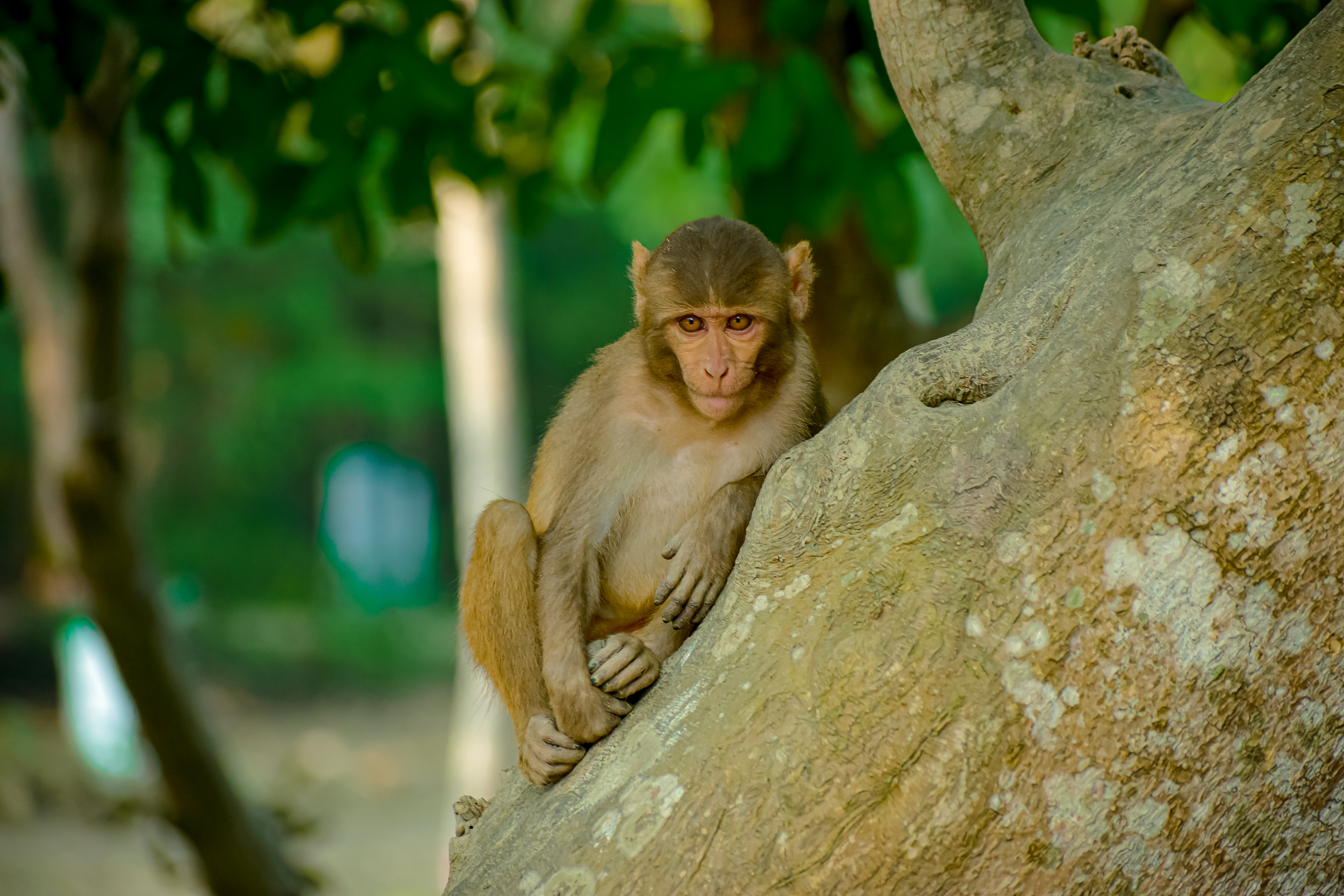
A Rhesus macaque (Macaca mulatta)

The Sundarbans are an important habitat for the Bengal tiger (Panthera tigris). The forest also provides habitat for small wild cats such as the jungle cat (Felis chaus), fishing cat (Prionailurus viverrinus), and leopard cat (P. bengalensis).

Several predators dwell in the labyrinth of channels, branches, and roots that poke up into the air. This is the only mangrove ecoregion that harbors the Indo-Pacific region's largest terrestrial predator, the Bengal tiger. Unlike in other habitats, tigers live here and swim among the mangrove islands, where they hunt scarce prey such as the chital deer (Axis axis), Indian muntjacs (Muntiacus muntjak), wild boar (Sus scrofa), and Rhesus macaque (Macaca mulatta). It is estimated that there are now 180 Bengal tigers and about 30,000 spotted deer in the area. The tigers are known to attack and kill humans who venture into the forest, with around 40 deaths recorded in 2000–2010.

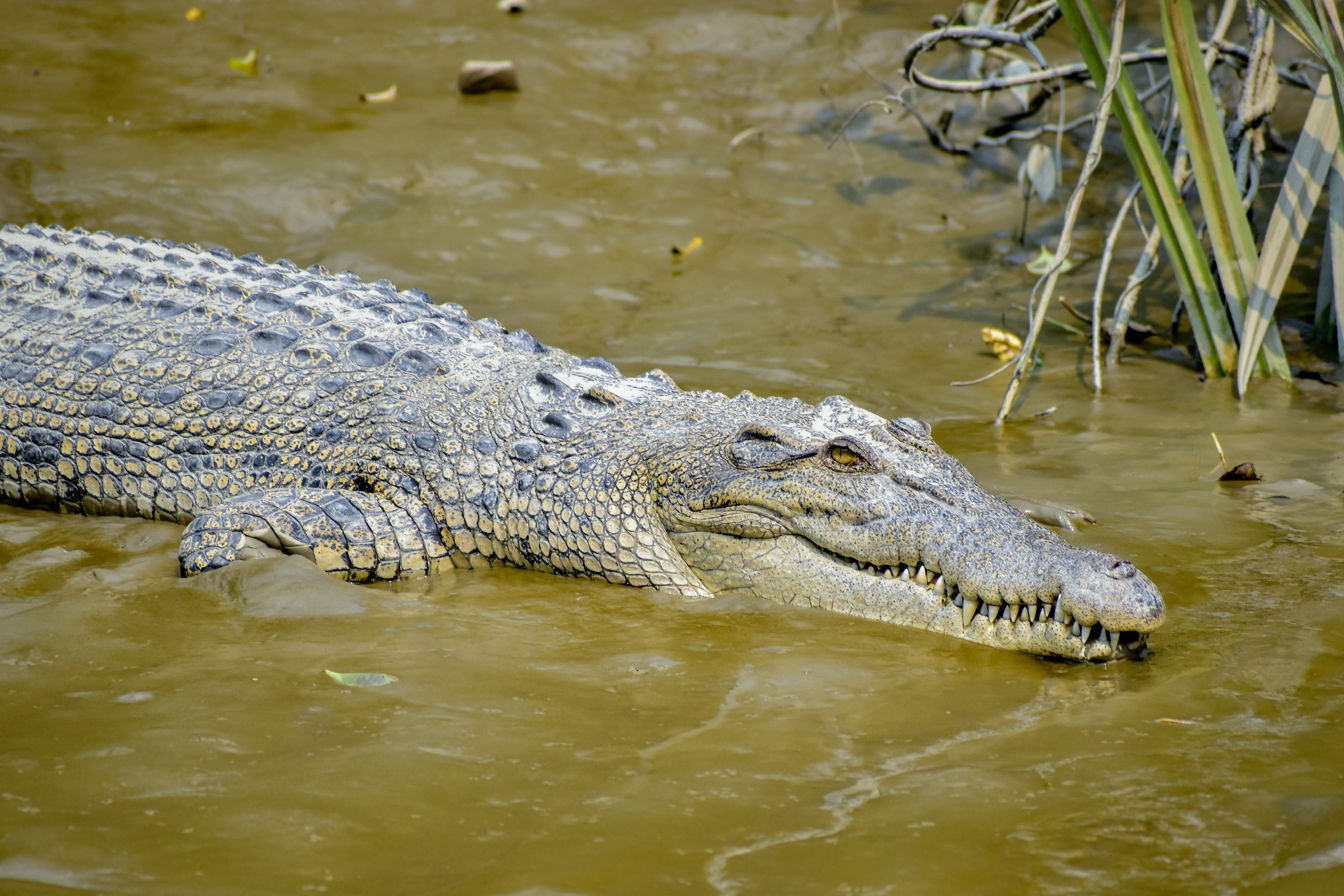
A saltwater crocodile on a river bank in the Sundarbans

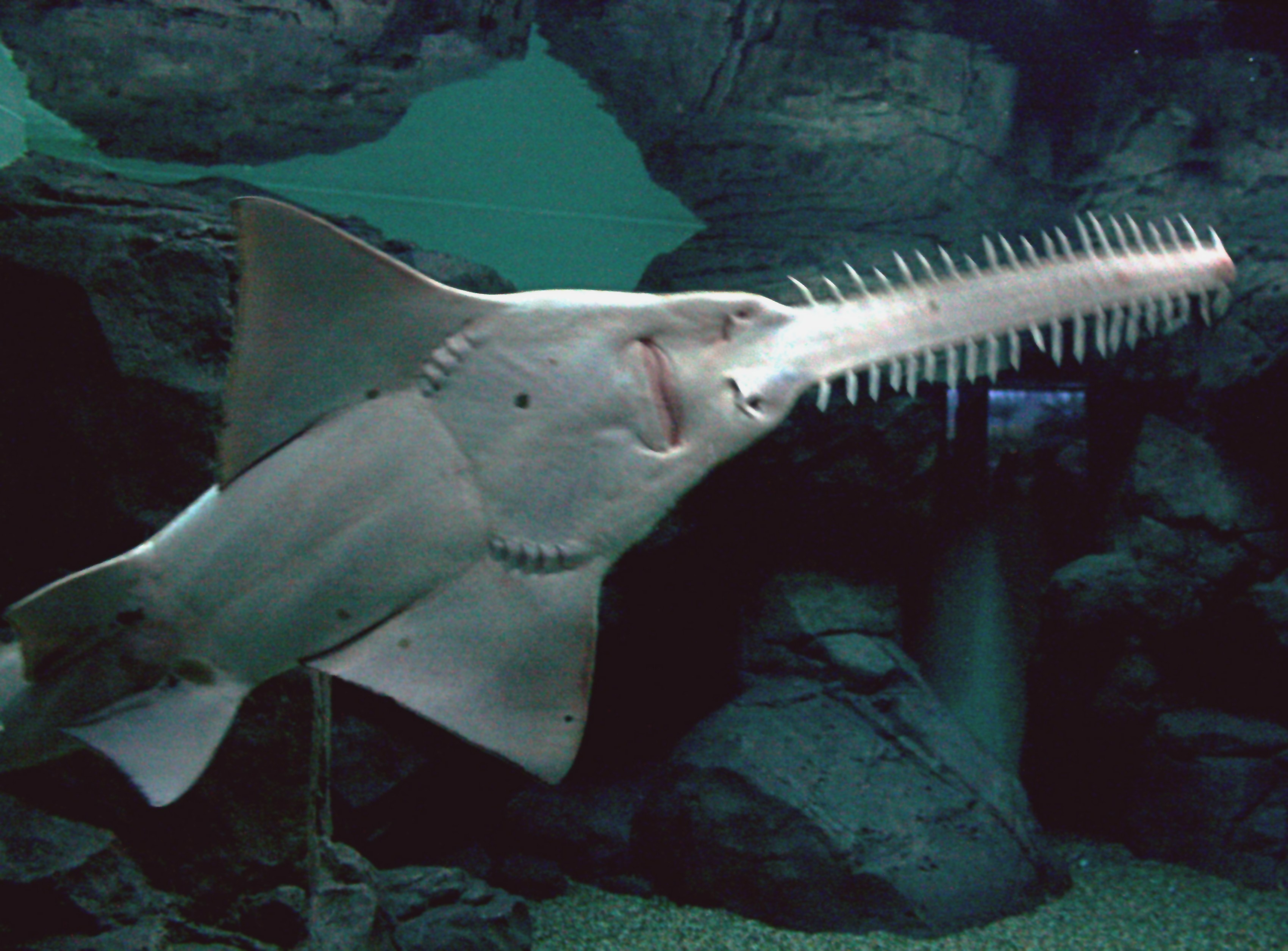
A largetooth sawfish

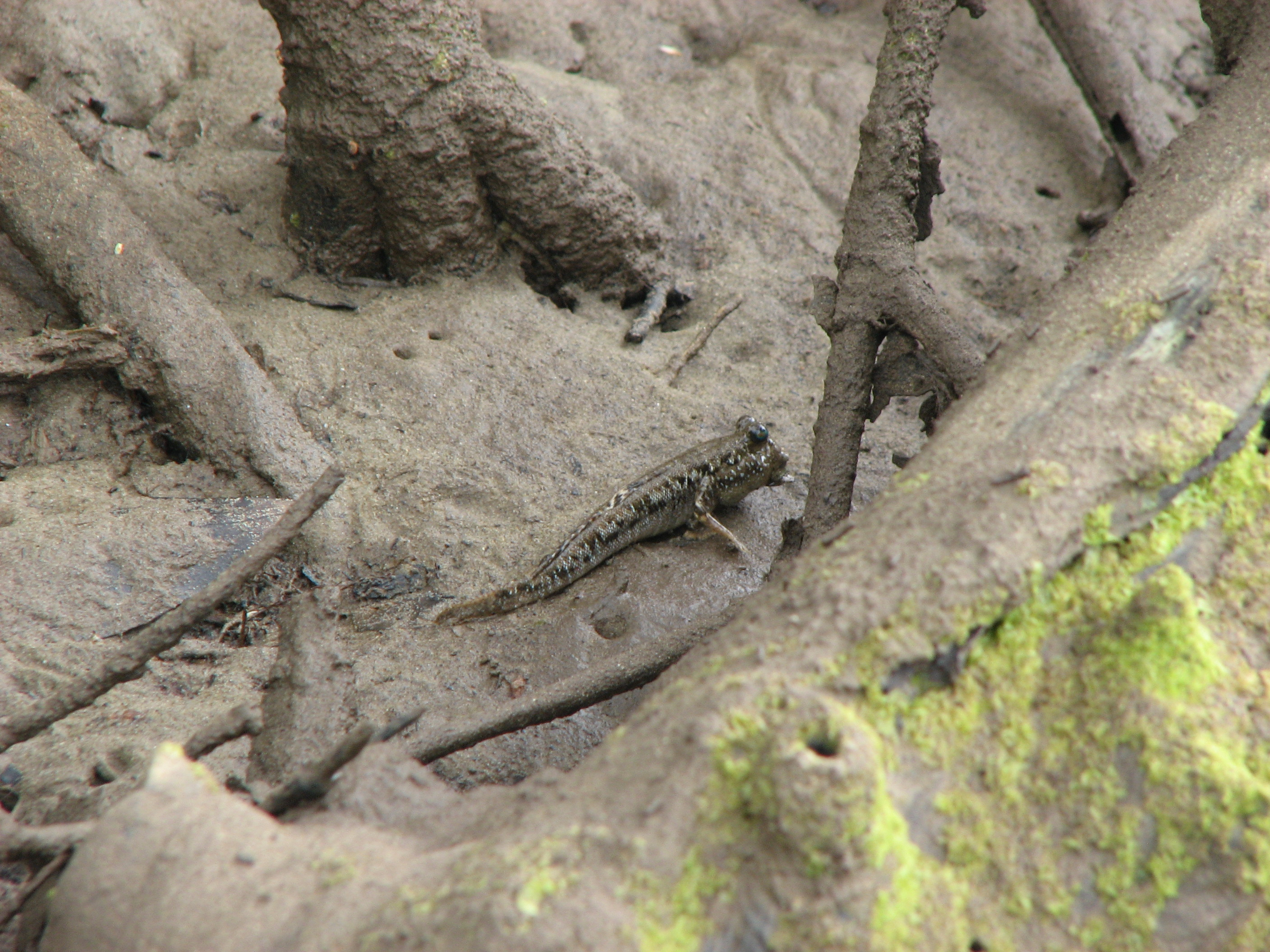
A mudskipper

=== Endangered and extinct species ===
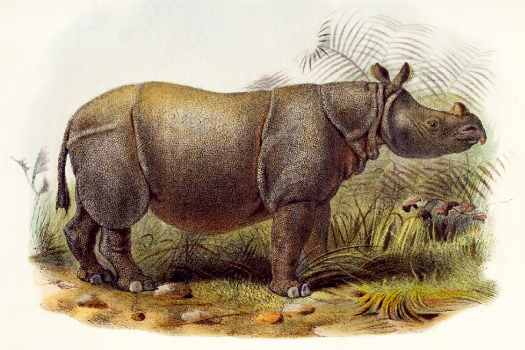
Extinct Indian Javan rhinoceros of Sunderbans, drawing from 1877

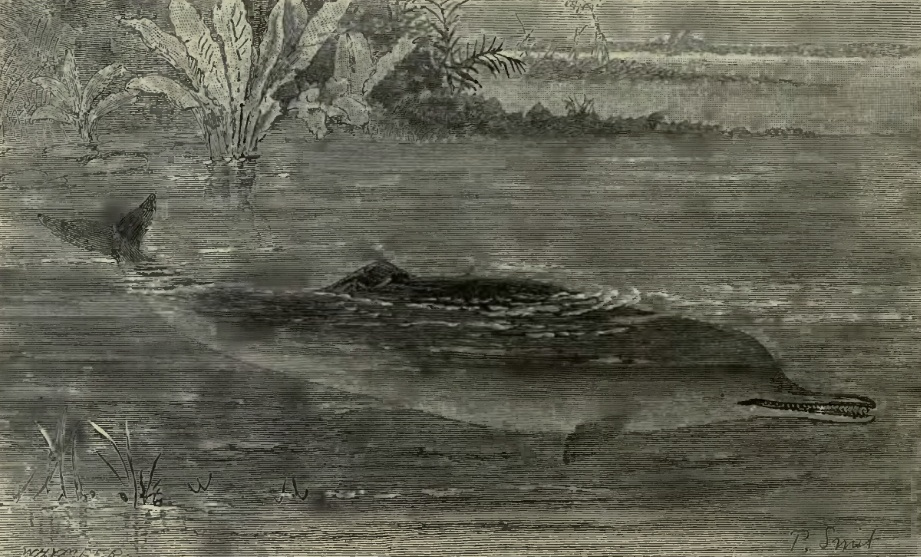
Gangetic dolphin, drawing from 1894

Forest inventories reveal a decline in standing volume of the two main commercial mangrove species – sundari (Heritiera spp.) and gewa (Excoecaria agallocha) — by 40% and 45% respectively between 1959 and 1983. Despite a total ban on all killing or capture of wildlife other than fish and some invertebrates, it appears that there is a consistent pattern of depleted biodiversity or loss of species (notably at least six mammals and one important reptile) in the 20th century, and that the "ecological quality of the original mangrove forest is declining".

The endangered species that live within the Sundarbans and extinct species that used to be include the Bengal tiger, estuarine crocodile, northern river terrapin (Batagur baska), olive ridley sea turtle, Gangetic dolphin, ground turtles, hawksbill sea turtles and king crabs (horse shoe). The Sundarbans hold globally important numbers of the critically endangered masked finfoot and are important wintering sites for the spoon-billed sandpiper and the Indian skimmer. Some species such as hog deer (Axis porcinus), water buffalos (Bubalus bubalis), barasingha or swamp deer (Cervus duvauceli), Javan rhinoceros (Rhinoceros sondaicus), Indian rhinoceros (Rhinoceros unicornis) and the mugger crocodile (Crocodylus palustris) started to become extinct in the Sundarbans towards the middle of the 20th century, because of extensive poaching and hunting by the British and locals. There are other threatened mammal species, such as the capped langur (Semnopithecus pileatus), smooth-coated otter (Lutrogale perspicillata), Asian small-clawed otter (Aonyx cinerea) and large Indian civet (Viverra zibetha).

== Climate change impact ==
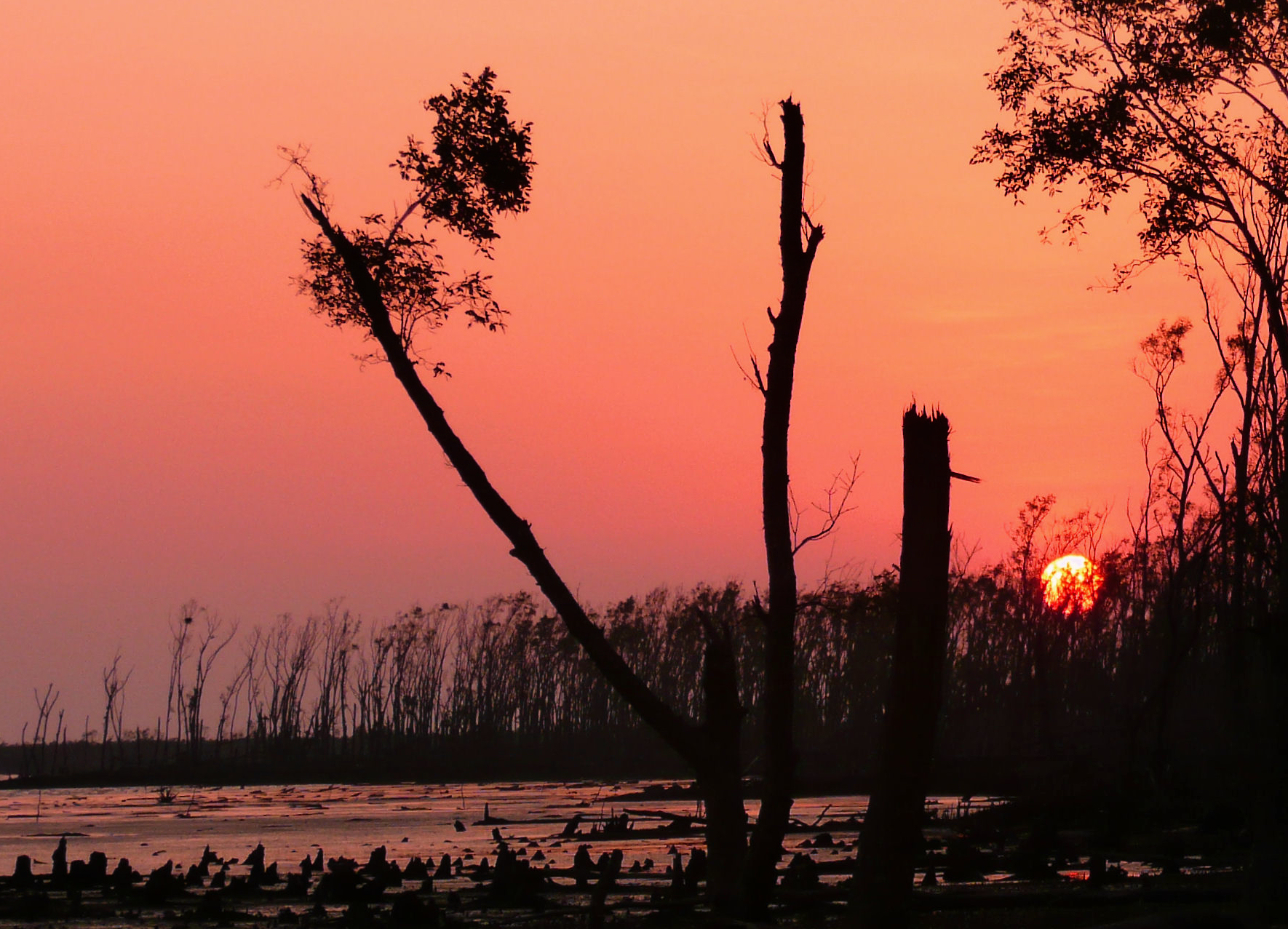
Sundarbans a few months after Cyclone Sidr

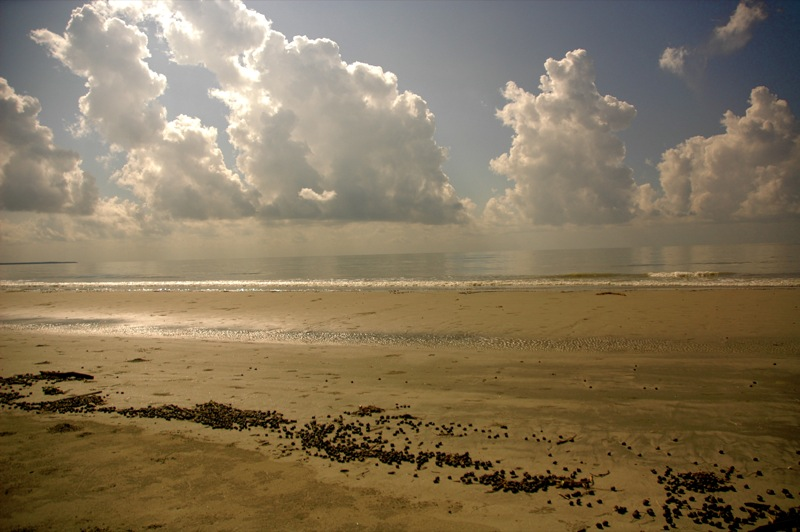
Mudflats in Sundarbans

The physical development processes along the coast are influenced by a multitude of factors, comprising wave motions, micro and macro-tidal cycles and long shore currents typical to the coastal tract. The shore currents vary greatly along with the monsoon. These are also affected by cyclonic action. Erosion and accretion through these forces maintains varying levels, as yet not properly measured, of physiographic change whilst the mangrove vegetation itself provides a remarkable stability to the entire system. During each monsoon season almost all the Bengal Delta is submerged, much of it for half a year. The sediment of the lower delta plain is primarily advected inland by monsoonal coastal setup and cyclonic events. One of the greatest challenges people living on the Ganges Delta may face in coming years is the threat of rising sea levels caused mostly by subsidence in the region and partly by climate change.

In many of the Bangladesh's mangrove wetlands, freshwater reaching the mangroves was considerably reduced from the 1970s because of diversion of freshwater in the upstream area by neighbouring India through the use of the Farakka Barrage bordering Rajshahi, Bangladesh. Also, the Bengal Basin is slowly tilting towards the east because of neo-tectonic movement, forcing greater freshwater input to the Bangladesh Sundarbans. As a result, the salinity of the Bangladesh Sundarbans is much lower than that of the Indian side. A 1990 study noted that there "is no evidence that environmental degradation in the Himalayas or a 'greenhouse' induced rise in sea level have aggravated floods in Bangladesh"; however, a 2007 report by UNESCO, "Case Studies on Climate Change and World Heritage" has stated that an anthropogenic 45-centimetre (18 in) rise in sea level (likely by the end of the 21st century, according to the Intergovernmental Panel on Climate Change), combined with other forms of anthropogenic stress on the Sundarbans, could lead to the destruction of 75 percent of the Sundarbans mangroves. Already, Lohachara Island and New Moore Island/South Talpatti Island have disappeared under the sea, and Ghoramara Island is half submerged.

In a study conducted in 2012, the Zoological Society of London (ZSL) found out that the Sunderban coast was retreating up to 200 metres (660 ft) in a year. Agricultural activities had destroyed around 17,179 hectares (42,450 acres) of mangroves within three decades (1975–2010). Shrimp cultivation had destroyed another 7,554 hectares (18,670 acres).

Researches from the School of Oceanographic Studies, Jadavpur University, estimated the annual rise in sea level to be 8 millimetres (0.31 in) in 2010. It had doubled from 3.14 millimetres (0.124 in) recorded in 2000. The rising sea levels had also submerged around 7,500 hectares (19,000 acres) of forest areas. This, coupled with an around 1.5 °C (2.7 °F) rise in surface water temperatures and increased levels of salinity have posed a problem for the survival of the indigenous flora and fauna. The Sundari trees are exceptionally sensitive to salinity and are being threatened with extinction.

Mangroves mitigate the effects of cyclones and tsunamis on coastal areas. Protecting mangrove health is therefore an urgent concern. Climate change-linked worsening of tidal and storm surges is causing flight to the mainland; about 13% of residents relocated in the decade of 2000–2010.

A 2015 ethnographic study, conducted by a team of researchers from Heidelberg university in Germany, found a crisis brewing in the Sunderbans. The study contended that poor planning on the part of the India and Bangladesh governments coupled with natural ecological changes were forcing the flight of human capital from the region

A 2026 study found that higher soil salinity in the Sundarbans mangroves was linked to lower functional diversity and changes in leaf traits, which may make the forest less resilient to environmental stress.

== Hazards ==
=== Natural hazards ===
According to a report created by UNESCO, the landfall of Cyclone Sidr damaged around 40% of Sundarbans in 2007.

=== Human made hazards ===
In August 2010, a memorandum of understanding was signed between Bangladesh Power Development Board (BPDB) and India's state-owned National Thermal Power Corporation (NTPC) where they designated to implement the coal-fired Rampal power station by 2016. The project, on an area of over 1,834 acres of land, is situated 14 kilometres (8.7 mi) north of the Sundarbans. This project violates the environmental impact assessment guidelines for coal-based thermal power plants. Environmental activists contend that the location of the Rampal Station violates provisions of the Ramsar Convention. The government of Bangladesh rejected the allegations that the coal-based power plant would adversely affect the world's largest mangrove forest.

On 9 December 2014 an oil-tanker named Southern Star VII, carrying 358,000 litres (79,000 imp gal; 95,000 US gal) of furnace oil, was sunk in the Sela river of Sundarbans after it had been hit by a cargo vessel. The oil spread over 350 km^{2} (140 sq mi) area after the clash, as of 17 December. The slick spread to a second river and a network of canals in the Sundarbans and blackened the shoreline. The event was very threatening to trees, plankton, and vast populations of small fishes and dolphins. The event occurred at a protected Sundarbans mangrove area, home to the rare Irrawaddy and Ganges dolphins. Until 15 December 2014 only 50,000 litres (11,000 imp gal; 13,000 US gal) of oil from the area had been cleaned up by local residents, the Bangladesh Navy, and the government of Bangladesh. Some reports indicated that the event killed some wildlife. On 13 December 2014, a dead Irrawaddy dolphin was seen floating on the Harintana-Tembulbunia channel of the Sela River.

== Economy ==
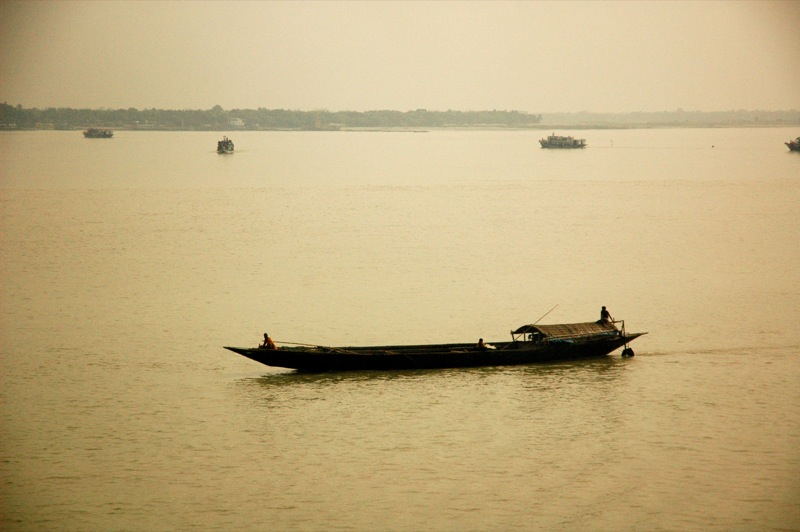
Commercial fishing boat in the Sundarbans

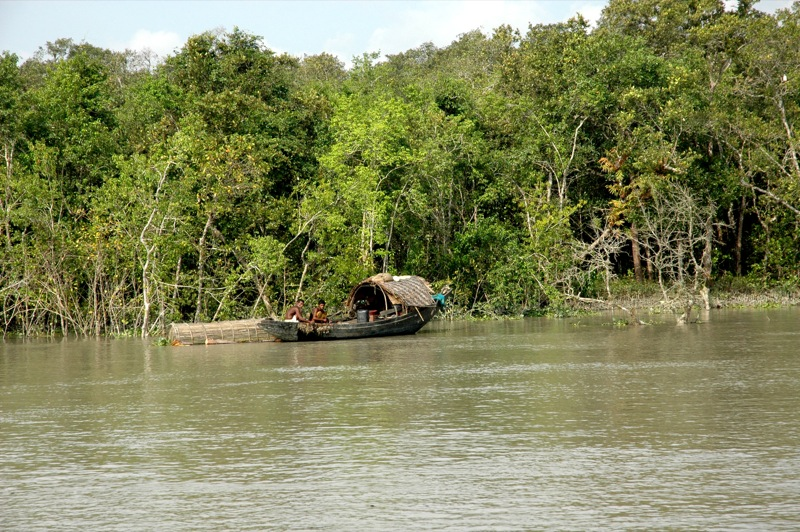
Logging boat in the Sundarbans

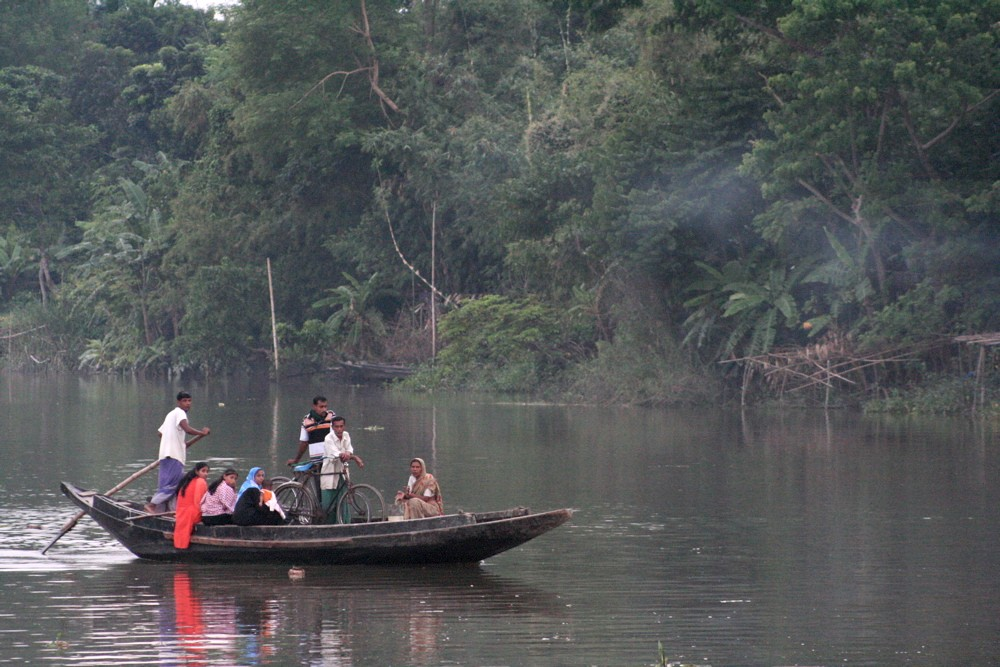
Ferry in the Sundarbans

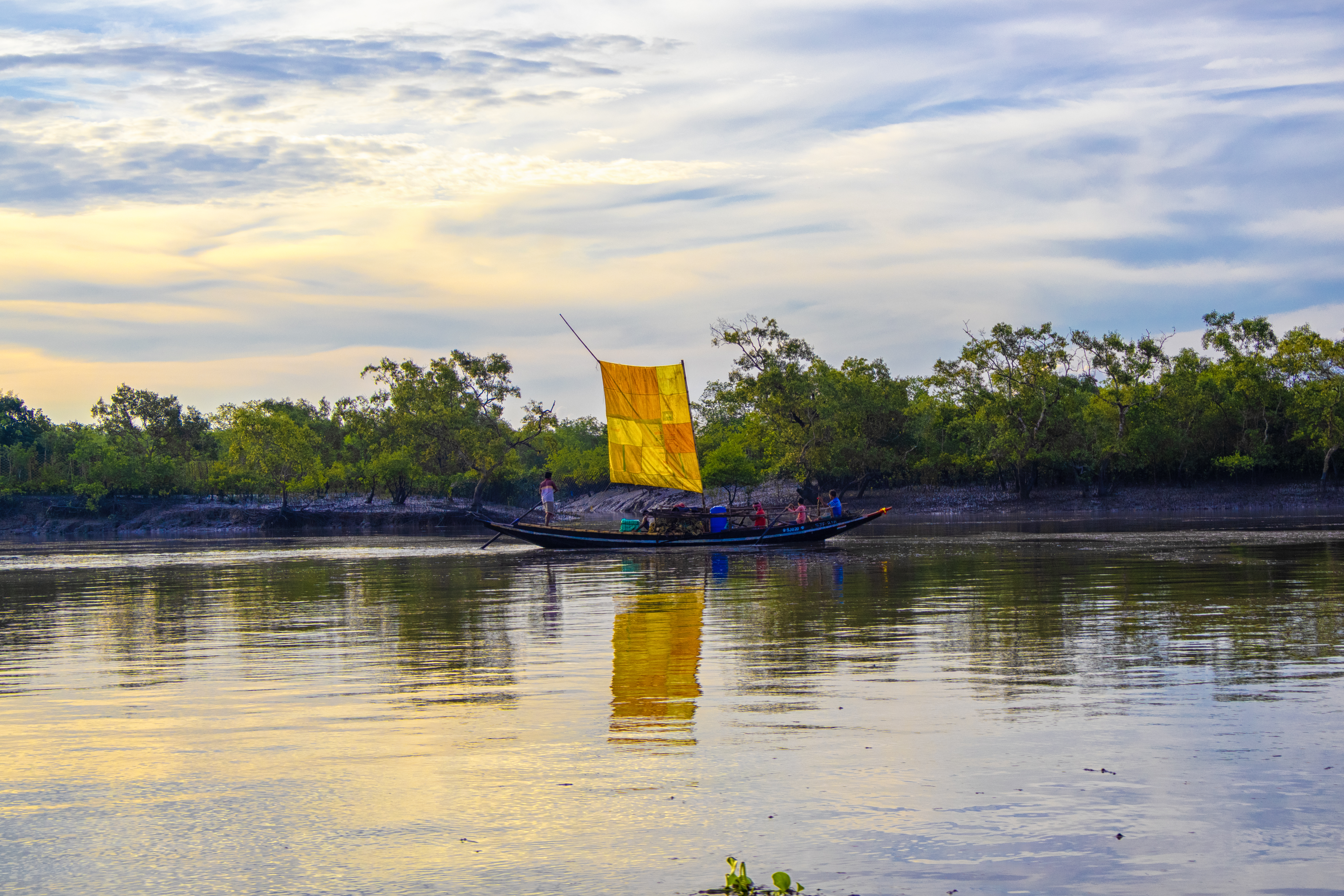
A sailboat in the Sundarbans

The forest has immense protective and productive functions. Constituting 51% of the total reserve forest of Bangladesh, it contributes about 41% of total forest revenue and accounts for about 45% of all timber and fuel wood output of the country.

=== Agriculture ===
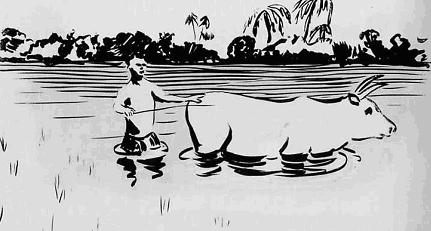
Flooded paddy fields in the Sunderbans

Part of the Sundarbans is shielded from tidal inflow by leaves and there one finds villages and agriculture. During the monsoon season, the low lying agricultural lands are waterlogged and the summer kharif crop is therefore mainly deepwater rice or floating rice. In the dry winter season, the land is normally uncropped and used for cattle grazing. The land near the villages are irrigated from ponds that were filled up during monsoon, and vegetable Rabi crops are grown. Some farms and mangrove areas are being cleared for aquaculture.

=== Habitation ===
The Sundarbans has a population of over 4 million,

=== Administration ===
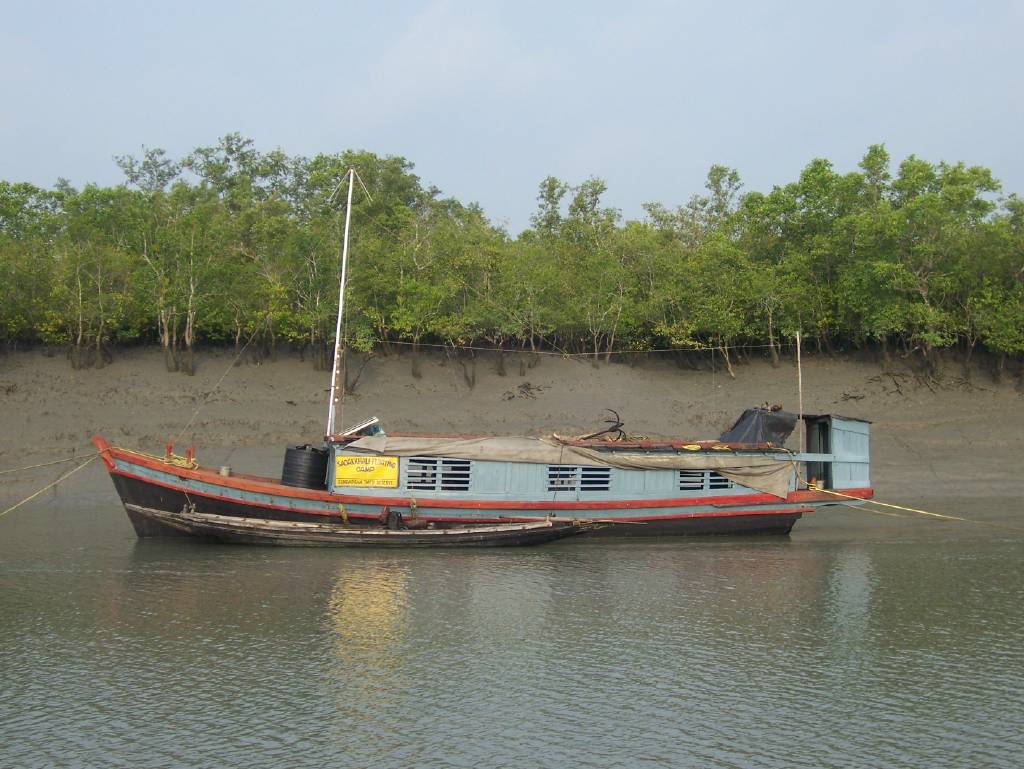
Police boat patrolling in Sundarban National Park, West Bengal

West Bengal Cabinet has approved a new district in South 24 Parganas and proposed district was named Sundarban.

== Protected areas ==
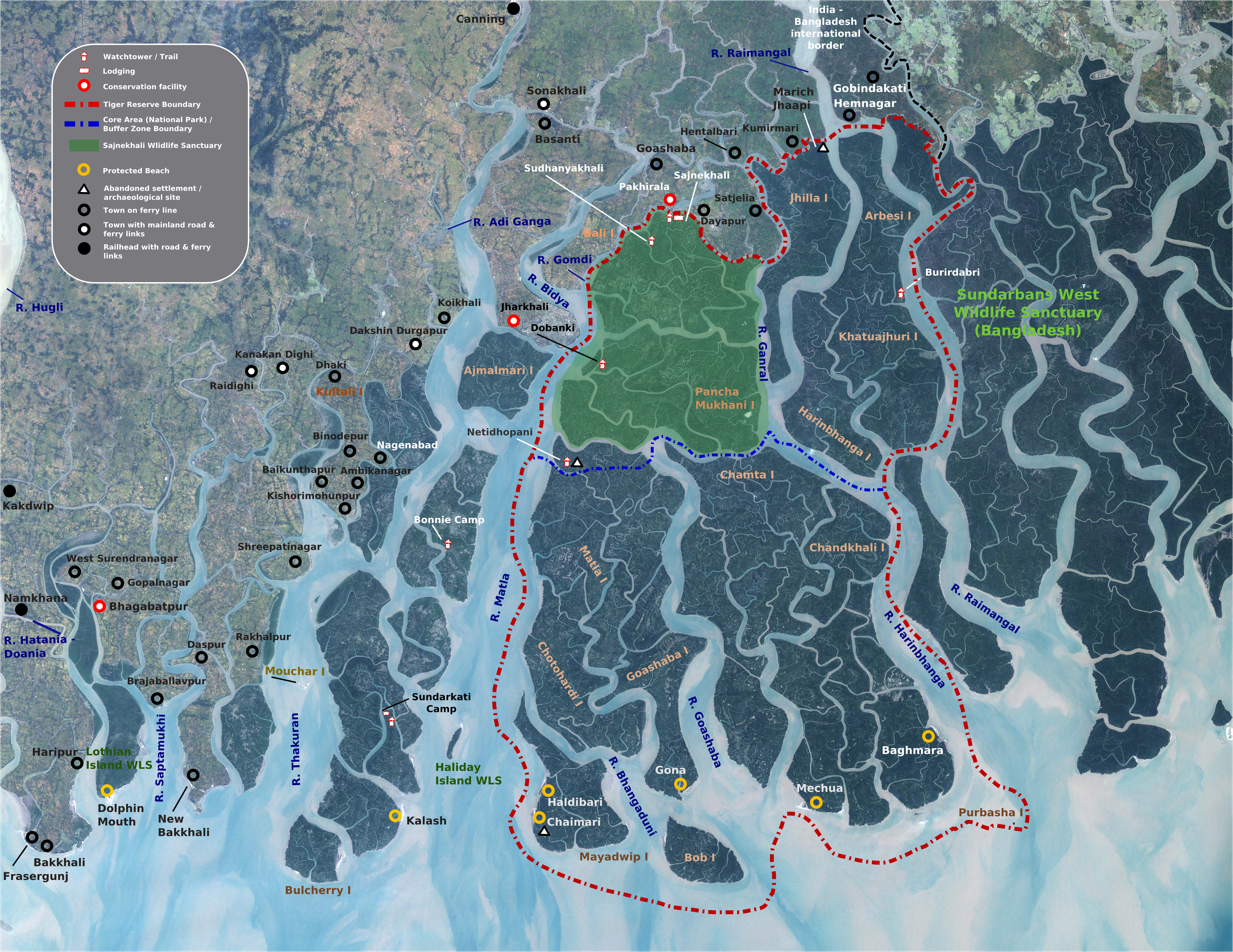
A map of the protected areas of the Indian Sunderbans, showing the boundaries of the tiger reserve, the national park and the three wildlife sanctuaries, conservation and lodging centres, subsistence towns, and access points. The entire forested (dark green) area constitutes the Biosphere Reserve, with the remaining forests outside the national park and wildlife sanctuaries being given the status of a reserve forest.

The Bangladesh part of the forest lies under two forest divisions, and four administrative ranges viz Chandpai (Khulna District), Sarankhola (Khulna), and Burigoalini (Satkhira District) and has sixteen forest stations. It is further divided into fifty-five compartments and nine blocks. There are three wildlife sanctuaries established in 1977 under the Bangladesh Wildlife (Preservation) Order, 1973 (P.O. 23 of 1973). The West Bengal part of the forest lies under the district of South & North 24 Parganas.

Protected areas cover 15% of the Sundarbans mangroves including Sundarbans National Park and Sajnakhali Wildlife Sanctuary, in West Bengal, Sundarbans East, Sundarbans South and Sundarbans West Wildlife Sanctuaries in Bangladesh.

In May 2019, the local authorities in Bangladesh killed 4 tiger poachers in a shootout in the Sunderbans mangrove area where currently 114 tigers dwell.

=== Sundarban National Park ===
The Sundarban National Park is a National Park, Tiger Reserve, and a Biosphere Reserve in West Bengal, India. It is part of the Sundarbans on the Ganges Delta, and adjacent to the Sundarbans Reserve Forest in Bangladesh. The delta is densely covered by mangrove forests, and is one of the largest reserves for the Bengal tiger. It is also home to a variety of bird, reptile and invertebrate species, including the salt-water crocodile. The present Sundarbans National Park was declared as the core area of Sundarbans Tiger Reserve in 1973 and a wildlife sanctuary in 1977. On 4 May 1984 it was declared a National Park.

=== Sundarbans West Wildlife Sanctuary ===
Sundarbans West Wildlife Sanctuary is a UNESCO World Heritage Site in Bangladesh. The region supports mangroves, including: sparse stands of Gewa (Excoecaria agallocha) and dense stands of Goran (Ceriops tagal), with discontinuous patches of Hantal palm (Phoenix paludosa) on drier ground, river banks and levees. The fauna of the sanctuary is very diverse with some 40 species of mammals, 260 species of birds and 35 species of reptiles. The greatest of these being the Bengal tiger of which an estimated 350 remain in the Bangladesh Sundarbans. Other large mammals are wild boar, chital horin (spotted deer), Indian otter and macaque monkey. Five species of marine turtles frequent the coastal zone and two endangered reptiles are present – the estuarine crocodile and the Indian python.

=== Sundarbans East Wildlife Sanctuary ===
Sundarbans East Wildlife Sanctuary extends over an area of 31,227 hectares (77,160 acres) in Bangladesh. Sundari trees (Heritiera fomes) dominate the flora, interspersed with Gewa (Excoecaria agallocha) and Passur (Xylocarpus mekongensis) with Kankra (Bruguiera gymnorhiza) occurring in areas subject to more frequent flooding. There is an understory of Shingra (Cynometra ramiflora) where, soils are drier and Amur (Aglaia cucullata) in wetter areas and Goran (Ceriops decandra) in more saline places. Nypa palm (Nypa fruticans) is widespread along drainage lines.

=== Sundarbans South Wildlife Sanctuary ===
Sundarbans South Wildlife Sanctuary extends over an area of 36,970 hectares (91,400 acres) in Bangladesh. There is evidently the greatest seasonal variation in salinity levels and possibly represents an area of relatively longer duration of moderate salinity where Gewa (Excoecaria agallocha) is the dominant woody species. It is often mixed with Sundri, which is able to displace in circumstances such as artificially opened canopies where Sundri does not regenerate as effectively. It is also frequently associated with a dense understory of Goran (Ceriops tagal) and sometimes Passur.

=== Sajnakhali Wildlife Sanctuary ===
Sajnakhali Wildlife Sanctuary is a 362-square-kilometre (140 mi^{2}) area in the northern part of the Sundarbans delta in South 24 Parganas district, West Bengal, India. It is mainly mangrove scrub, forest and swamp. It was set up as a sanctuary in 1976. It is home to a rich population of different species of wildlife, such as water fowl, heron, pelican, spotted deer, rhesus macaques, wild boar, tigers, water monitor lizards, fishing cats, otters, olive ridley turtles, crocodiles, batagur terrapins, and migratory birds.

== In popular culture ==
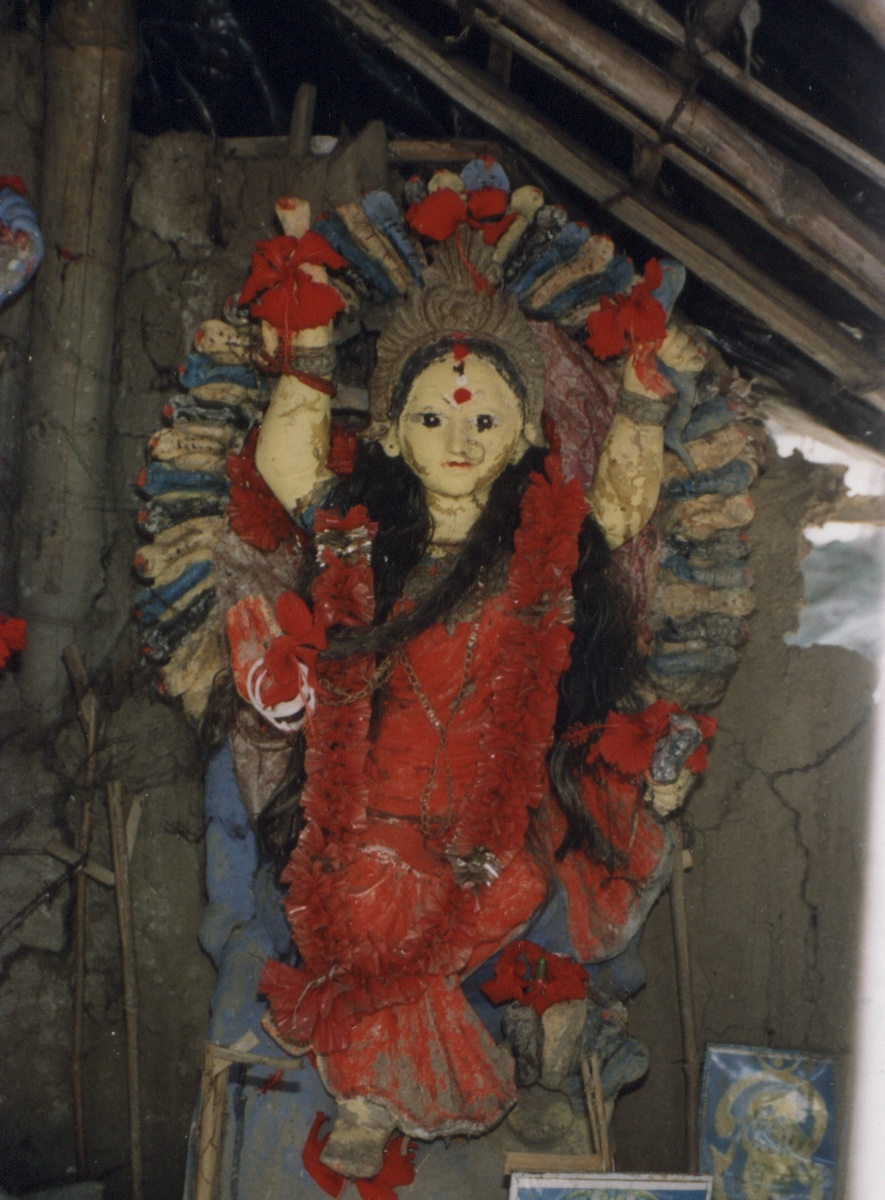
Idol of Manasa, the deity of snakes

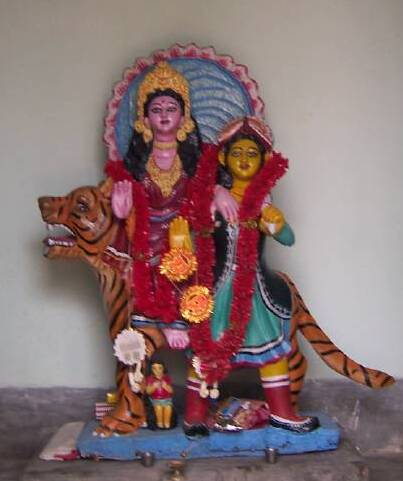
Bonbibi, the goddess of Sundarbans

The Sundarbans is celebrated through numerous Bengali folk songs and dances, often centred around the folk heroes, gods and goddesses specific to the Sunderbans (like Bonbibi and Dakshin Rai) and to the Lower Gangetic Delta (like Manasa and Chand Sadagar). The Bengali folk epic Manasamangal mentions Netidhopani and has some passages set in the Sundarbans during the heroine Behula's quest to bring her husband Lakhindar back to life.

The area provides the setting for several novels by Emilio Salgari, (e.g. The Mystery of the Black Jungle). Sundarbaney Arjan Sardar, a novel by Shibshankar Mitra, and Padma Nadir Majhi, a novel by Manik Bandopadhyay, are based on the rigors of lives of villagers and fishermen living in the Sunderbans region, and are woven into the Bengali psyche to a great extent. Part of the plot of Salman Rushdie's Booker Prize winning novel Midnight's Children is set in the Sundarbans. This forest is adopted as the setting of Kunal Basu's short story "The Japanese Wife" and the subsequent film adaptation. Most of the plot of an internationally acclaimed novelist, Amitav Ghosh's 2004 novel, The Hungry Tide, is set in the Sundarbans. The plot centres on a headstrong American cetologist who arrives to study a rare species of river dolphin, enlisting a local fisherman and translator to aid her. The book also mentions two accounts of the Bonbibi story of "Dukhey's Redemption". Manik Bandopadhyay's Padma Nadir Majhi was made into a movie by Goutam Ghose.

The Sunderbans has been the subject of a detailed and well-researched scholarly work on Bonbibi (a 'forest goddess' venerated by Hindus), on the relation between the islanders and tigers and on conservation and how it is perceived by the inhabitants of the Sundarbans, as well as numerous non-fiction books, including The Man-Eating Tigers of Sundarbans by Sy Montegomery for a young audience, which was shortlisted for the Dorothy Canfield Fisher Children's Book Award. In Up The Country, Emily Eden discusses her travels through the Sunderbans. Numerous documentary movies have been made about the Sunderbans, including the 2003 IMAX production Shining Bright about the Bengal tiger. The acclaimed BBC TV series Ganges documents the lives of villagers, especially honey collectors, in the Sundarbans.

== See also ==
- Sundarbans Tiger Project
- Mangroves in India
- Indian Council of Forestry Research and Education
- Sangu Wildlife Sanctuary
- Environmental impact of development in the Sundarbans
- Tiger attacks in the Sundarbans

== Sources ==
- This article incorporates text from a publication now in the public domain: Chisholm, Hugh, ed. (1911). "Sundarbans". Encyclopædia Britannica (11th ed.). Cambridge University Press.
- Laskar Muqsudur Rahman, The Sundarbans: A Unique Wilderness of the World Archived 28 February 2008 at the Wayback Machine; at USDA Forest Reserve Archived 8 July 1997 at the Wayback Machine; McCool, Stephen F.; Cole, David N.; Borrie, William T.; O'Loughlin, Jennifer, comps. 2000. Wilderness science in a time of change conference, Volume 2: Wilderness within the context of larger systems; 1999 May 23–27; Missoula, MT. Proceedings RMRS-P-15-VOL-2. Ogden, UT: US Department of Agriculture, Forest Service, Rocky Mountain Research Station.
- Terminal Report, Integrated Resource Development of the Sundarbans Reserved Forest Archived 23 May 2017 at the Wayback Machine: Project Findings and Recommendations, Food and Agriculture Organization (acting as executing agency for the United Nations Development Programme), United Nations, Rome, 1998 (prepared for the Government of Bangladesh)
- Blasco, F. (1975). The Mangroves of India. Institut Francis de Pondichéry, Travaux de las Section Scientifique et Technique, Tome XIV, Facicule 1. Pondicherry, India.
- Jalais, Annu. (2005). "Dwelling on Morichjhanpi: When Tigers Became 'Citizens', Refugees 'Tiger-Food'"; Economic and Political Weekly, 23 April 2005, pp. 1757 – 1762.
- Jalais, Annu. (2007). "The Sundarbans: Whose World Heritage Site?", Conservation and Society (vol. 5, no. 4).
- Jalais, Annu. (2008). "Unmasking the Cosmopolitan Tiger", Nature and Culture (vol. 3, no. 1), pp. 25–40.
- Jalais, Annu. (2008). "Bonbibi: Bridging Worlds", Indian Folklore, serial no. 28, Jan 2008.
- Jalais, Annu. (2009). "Confronting Authority, Negotiating Morality: tiger prawn seed collection in the Sundarbans", International Collective in Support of Fishworkers, Yemaya, 32, Nov. Archived 2 September 2018 at the Wayback Machine; Also in French: http://base.d-p-h.info/en/fiches/dph/fiche-dph-8148.html Archived 11 May 2013 at the Wayback Machine
- Jalais, Annu. (2010). "Braving Crocodiles with Kali: Being a prawn-seed collector and a modern woman in the 21st century Sundarbans", Socio-Legal Review, Vol. 6.
- Montgomery, Sy (1995). Spell of the Tiger: The Man-Eaters of Sundarbans. Houghton Mifflin Company, New York.
- Rivers of Life: Living with Floods in Bangladesh. M. Q. Zaman. Asian Survey, Vol. 33, No. 10 (October 1993), pp. 985–996
- Allison, M. A.; Kepple, E. B. (September 2001). "Modern sediment supply to the lower delta plain of the Ganges-Brahmaputra River in Bangladesh". Geo-Marine Letters. 21 (2): 66. Bibcode:2001GML....21...66M. doi:10.1007/s003670100069. S2CID 140636544.
- Sundarbans on United Nations Environment Programme
- Brammer, H. (July 1990). "Floods in Bangladesh: II. Flood Mitigation and Environmental Aspects". The Geographical Journal. 156 (2): 158–165. Bibcode:1990GeogJ.156..158B. doi:10.2307/635323. JSTOR 635323.
- Environmental classification of mangrove wetlands of India Archived 1 July 2007 at the Wayback Machine. V. Selvam. Current Science, Vol. 84, No. 6, 25 March 2003.
- Green, M.J.B.; Centre, W.C.M.; Parks, I.C.o.N.; Areas, P. (1990). Iucn Directory of South Asian Protected Areas. IUCN-The World Conservation Union. ISBN 978-2-8317-0030-4.
