= Sundarbans South Wildlife Sanctuary =

Wildlife sanctuary in Bangladesh

Coordinates: 21.815°N 89.392°E

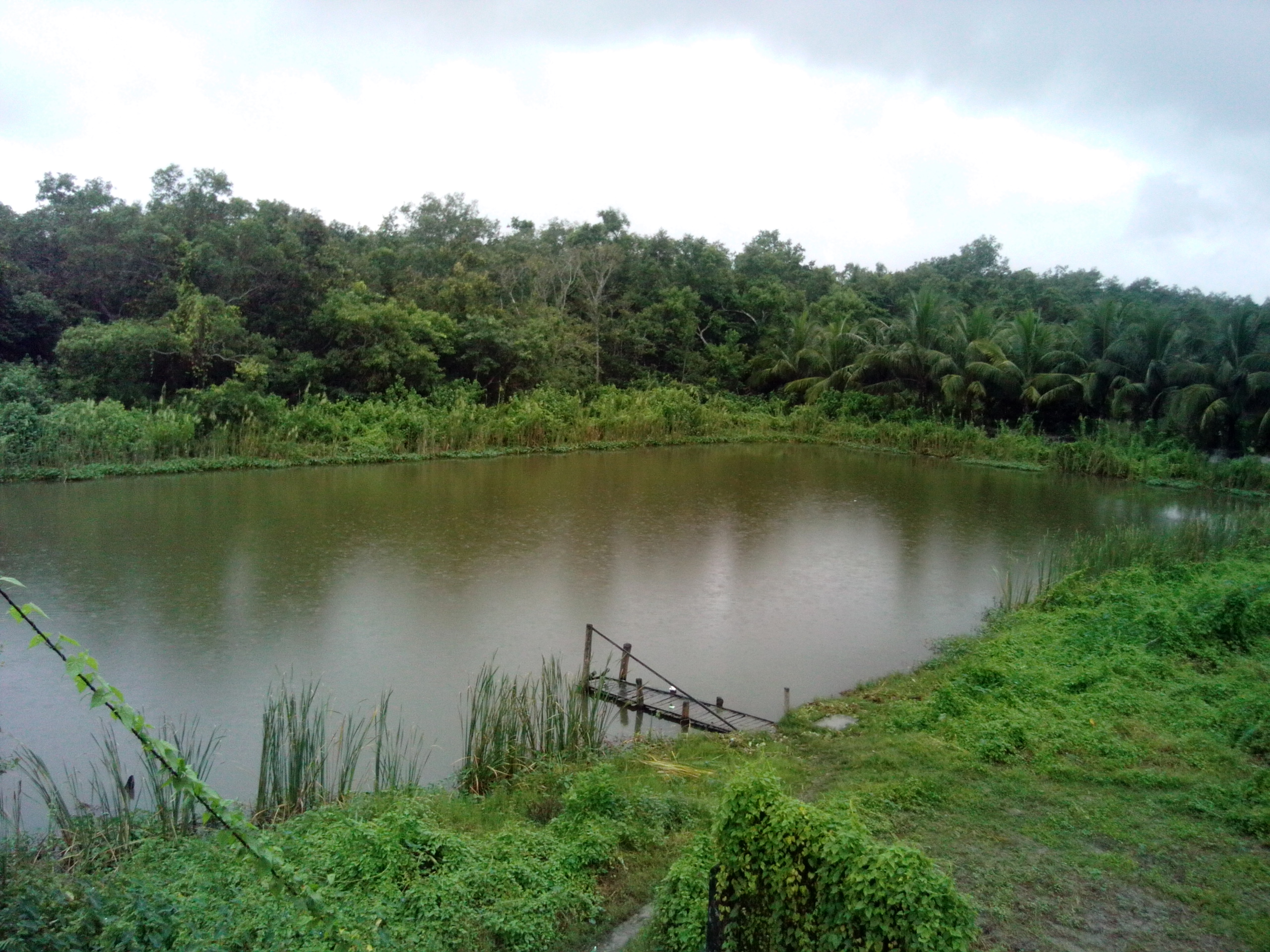
Karamjhal, Sundarban

Sundarbans South Wildlife Sanctuary is a reserve forest in Bangladesh that extends over an area of 36,970 hectares of mangrove forest. It is situated next to the Sundarbans National Park in West Bengal, India. The sanctuary is one of three Sundarbans wildlife sanctuaries, the others being the Sundarbans East Wildlife Sanctuary and the Sundarbans West Wildlife Sanctuary.

== Flora ==
The Gewa (Euphorbiaceae) tree is the dominant woody species in the Sanctuary. The other tree found abundantly is the Sundri (Heritiera fomes) tree. In areas where the Sundri tree does not regenerate effectively a dense understory is artificially created to enable growth.

== Fauna ==
The wildlife includes Bengal tiger, fishing cat, leopard cat, jungle cat, spotted deer, wild boar, rhesus macaque, small-clawed otter, golden jackal, Ganges river dolphin, Irrawaddy dolphin, saltwater crocodile, northern river terrapin, Indian rock python, king cobra, white-rumped vulture, lesser adjutant stork, masked finfoot and many more.

== Environment ==
Salinity levels vary greatly between seasons. This possibly represents an area of relatively longer duration of moderate salinity.
