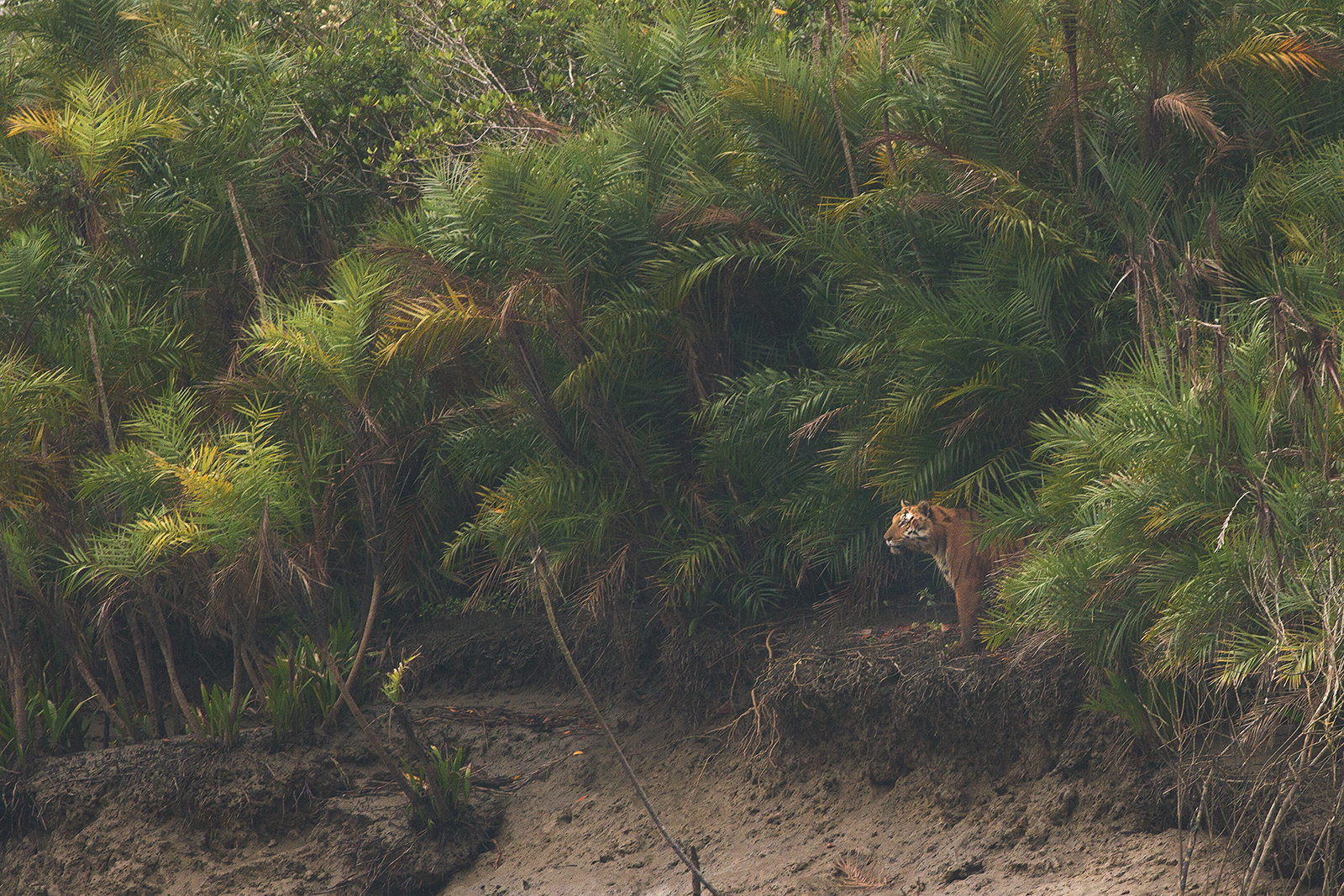
- A tiger looks out from a forest of mangrove date palms in the Sundarbans National Park, in India.

Scientific classification
- Kingdom: Plantae
- Clade: Tracheophytes
- Clade: Angiosperms
- Clade: Monocots
- Clade: Commelinids
- Order: Arecales
- Family: Arecaceae
- Genus: Phoenix
- Species: P. paludosa

Binomial name
- Phoenix paludosa Roxb.

Synonyms
- Phoenix andamanensis W.T.Mill., J.G.Sm. & N.Taylor bis; Phoenix siamensis Miq.

= Phoenix paludosa =

Species of palm

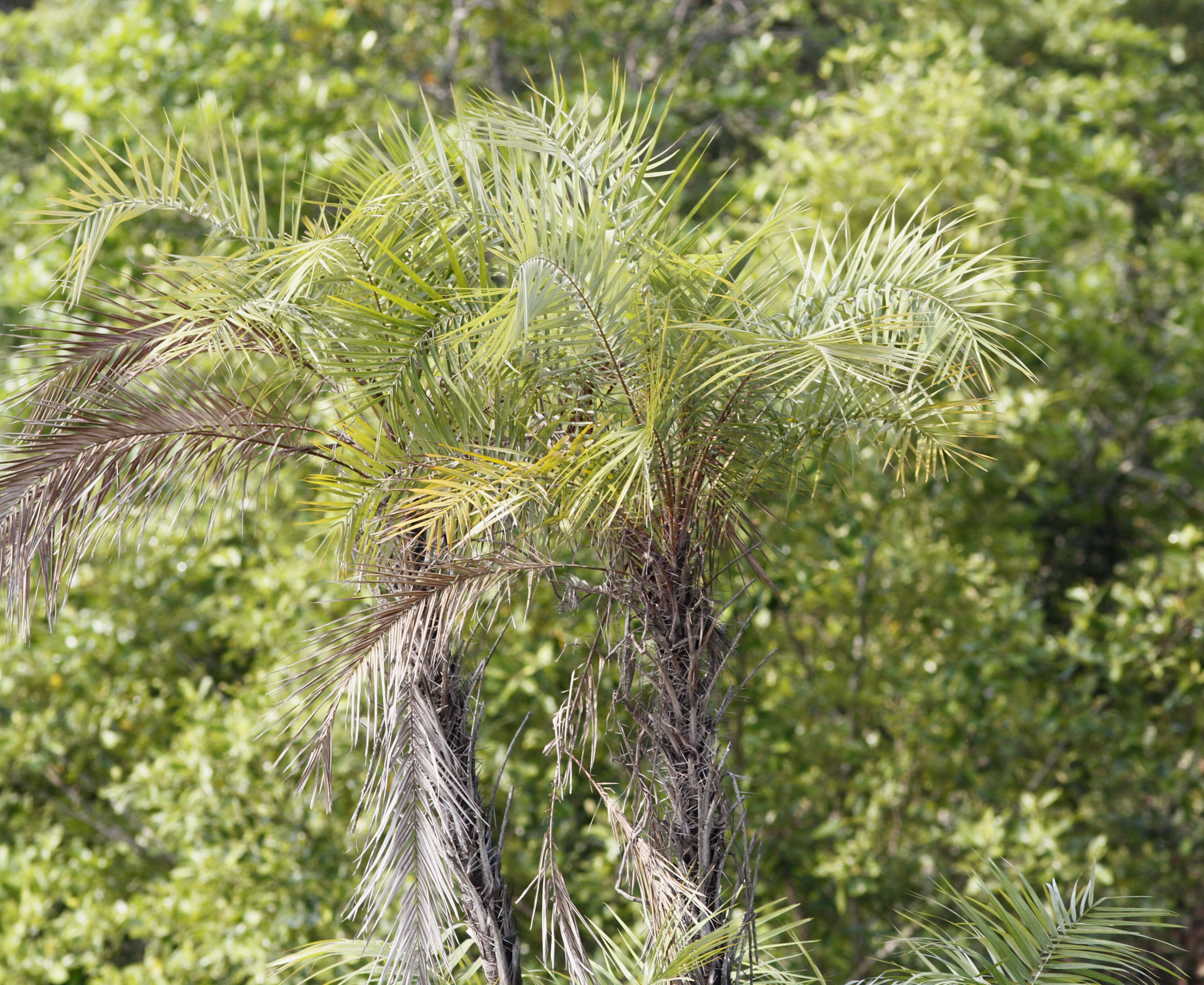
In Sundarbans, Bangladesh

Phoenix paludosa (paludosa, Latin, swampy), also called the mangrove date palm, is a species of flowering plant in the palm family, indigenous to coastal regions of India, Bangladesh, Myanmar, Thailand, Cambodia, Sumatra, Vietnam and peninsular Malaysia. They are also known as sea dates. The trees grow in clusters, to 5 m (16 ft) high, usually forming dense thickets. The leaves are 2 to 3 m (6.6 to 9.8 ft) long and recurved. Similar to Nypa leaves, but smaller and placed towards the plant's top.
