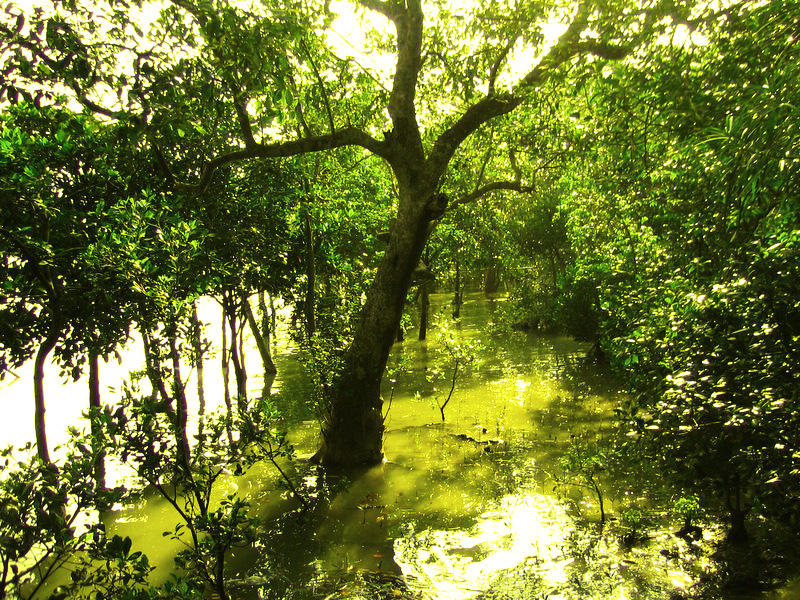

Conservation status
- Endangered (IUCN 3.1)

Scientific classification
- Kingdom: Plantae
- Clade: Embryophytes
- Clade: Tracheophytes
- Clade: Angiosperms
- Clade: Eudicots
- Clade: Rosids
- Order: Malvales
- Family: Malvaceae
- Genus: Heritiera
- Species: H. fomes

Binomial name
- Heritiera fomes Banks

Synonyms
- Heritiera minor Roxb.

= Heritiera fomes =

Species of tree

Heritiera fomes is a species of mangrove tree in the family Malvaceae. Its common names include sunder, sundri, jekanazo and pinlekanazo. It is the dominant mangrove tree species of the Sundarbans of Bangladesh and India, and comprises about 70% of the trees in the area. H. fomes is a major timber-producing tree. It is threatened by over-harvesting, water diversions in the Ganges Basin, fluctuations in salinity due to upstream and coastal development and top dying disease. The International Union for Conservation of Nature has assessed it as being "endangered".

== Description ==
Heritiera fomes is a medium-sized evergreen tree growing to a height of 15 to 25 metres (49 to 82 ft). The roots are shallow and spreading and send up pneumatophores. The trunk develops buttresses and is grey with vertically fissured bark. Trees with girths of 2 metres (6 ft 7 in) used to be found but these large trees have mostly been harvested for their timber. The trunk has few large branches and the canopy is open. The leathery leaves are elliptical and tend to be clustered at the ends of the twigs. The pink or orange bell-shaped flowers are each about 5 mm (0.2 in) across. They form in panicles, each flower being either male or female. The fruit carpels are up to 5 cm (2.0 in) long and 3.8 cm (1.5 in) wide. They ripen between June and August and the seeds germinate readily.

== Distribution and habitat ==
Heritiera fomes is native to coastal regions of the Indo-Pacific, its range extending from the east coast of India through Bangladesh and Malaysia to Myanmar and Thailand. Compared to other species of mangrove, it grows in less saline environments and on drier ground that gets inundated by the tide only infrequently. It thrives on clayey soils and is the dominant species in these habitats, typically growing on the low banks that form around the edges of saucer-shaped, newly emerged islands. It is the dominant mangrove species in the area and its local name, sundari, gives the Sundarbans region its name.

== Uses ==
Timber produced from Heritiera fomes is hard, fine-grained, tough and elastic. The heartwood is dark red or reddish brown and the sapwood is a paler reddish brown. The timber has many uses; in bridge building, house construction, boat building and joinery, as utility poles and tool handles, making hardboard and as firewood. The tree is grown commercially in plantations.

The bark of H. fomes is rich in procyanidins. The ethanol extract has been shown to have antioxidant properties. It also shows antimicrobial activities against Kocuria rhizophila, Staphylococcus aureus, Bacillus subtilis and Pseudomonas aeruginosa and is non-toxic in brine shrimp toxicity tests.

== Status ==
The International Union for Conservation of Nature has assessed this mangrove as being "endangered". Although it is common in places, it has a restricted range and is declining because of the clearing of mangroves for coastal development, rice farming, shrimp ponds and oil palm plantations. It is present in several protected areas in the Sundarbans in Bangladesh as well as in India, but there and elsewhere it is being affected by top dying disease. This causes branches and parts of the crown to die back, and can result in tree mortality. Gall cankers may be present in affected parts and wood-boring insects and fungi also attack the trees.

== See also ==
- Top dying disease — affecting this species in the Sundarbans.
