= Sundarbans (disambiguation) =

Sundarbans are freshwater swamp forests in the tropical moist broadleaf forest ecoregion of Bangladesh and West Bengal, India.

It may specifically refer to:

- The Sundarbans delta itself, which hosts the largest mangrove forest in the world and lies at the mouth of the Ganges and is spread across areas of Bangladesh and West Bengal, India:
  - Sundarbans district, a proposed district of West Bengal, India
  - Sundarbans Biosphere Reserve, biosphere reserve of South 24 Parganas, West Bengal, India
  - Sundarbans National Park, national park and nature reserve in South 24 Parganas, West Bengal, India
  - Sundarbans Reserve Forest, complex of forests in Bangladesh, made up of three wildlife sanctuaries
  - Sundarbans settlements, area cleared for human settlement in North 24 Paganas and the South 24 Parganas districts of West Bengal, India
  - Sundarban Honey, a type of honey from West Bengal, India
  - Bengal tiger also known as the Sundarbans tiger, a tiger population of the Indian subcontinent
  - Sundarbans tiger project, Bangladesh Forest Department initiative to protect the Bengal tiger in the Sundarbans delta
  - Sundarbani dialect, dialect of Bengali spoken in Satkhira district of Bangladesh and South 24 parganas district of India

== See also ==
- Sundarban Mahavidyalaya, college in Kakdwip, South 24 Parganas, West Bengal, India
- Sundarban Hazi Desarat College, college in Pathankhali, South 24 Parganas, West Bengal, India
- Sunderbani, town in Jammu and Kashmir, India
  - Kalakote–Sunderbani Assembly constituency
