= Sundarbans Biosphere Reserve =

Nature reserve

- Location within West Bengal
- Location: Gangentic Delta (West Bengal, India)
- Coordinates: 21°54′19″N 88°37′09″E
- Area: 9,630 km^{2} (3,720 sq mi)
- Established: 29 March 1989; 37 years ago
- Governing body: West Bengal forest department, Project Tiger
- Website: sundarbanaffairswb.in/home/page/sundarban_biosphere

The Sundarbans Biosphere Reserve is a biosphere reserve in the Indian state of West Bengal, based on the UNESCO Man and the Biosphere (MAB) Programme list. It is one of the 18 biosphere reserves in India and the third largest in terms of area. The Biosphere Reserve is constituted of the Sundarbans area spread across South 24 Parganas and North 24 Parganas districts of West Bengal. The Indian Sundarbans as a Biosphere Reserve is bounded by the Muri Ganga River in the west and the Hariabhanga and Raimangal rivers in the east. Sundarbans has a very rich diversity of aquatic and terrestrial flora and fauna. In fact, the highly productive ecosystems of the Sundarbans act as natural fish nurseries. It provides habitat for the Royal Bengal Tiger (Panthera tigris tigris).

The Sundarbans Biosphere Reserve or Indian Sundarbans covers an area of 9,630 square kilometers (3,720 sq mi) and is divided into core, buffer, and transi-tion zones. The area of reserved forest under the Biosphere Reserve is about 4263 km^{2}, of which 55% land is under vegetation cover and the remaining 45 per cent under wetland/intertidal zone. About 40% of the reserved forest area is covered under the protected area. The protected areas under the Biosphere Reserve are Sundarbans National Park, Sajnekhali Wildlife Sanctuary, Lothian Island Wildlife Sanctuary and Haliday Island Wildlife Sanctuary. The Sundarbans Biosphere Reserve area includes the Sundarbans Tiger Reserve, which comprises a total of 2558 km^{2} of protected forest area.

== Geography ==
The Sundarbans Biosphere Reserve covers an area of 9,630 square kilometers (3,720 sq mi) in the South 24 Parganas and North 24 Parganas district districts of south-eastern West Bengal, as well as over 100 small and large islands. It extends from Haroa and Hasnabad blocks of North 24 Parganas district in the north to the Bay of Bengal in the south. There are numerous wide rivers running through the biosphere reserve, which flow mainly from north to south; Seawater flows into the biosphere reserve through river channels. The eastern boundary of the biosphere reserve is Haribhanga and Raimangal rivers. Wetlands are observed in the northern part of the biosphere reserve, which are mainly fresh water. The western boundary is determined by the Hooghly river basin.

== History ==
=== Human history ===
==== Sundarbans Biosphere Reserve established ====
As part of the Man and the Biosphere Program (MAB) adopted by the UNESCO General Conference in 1970, the Ministry of Environment and Forests, Government of India has adopted the National MAB Program and declared the entire 9630 km^{2} area of the Indian Sundarbans as a biosphere. The Indian part of the Sundarbans was established as a Biosphere Reserve by a notification in 1989, with the objective of coordinating and integrating conservation, research and training activities to create conditions for better harmony between man and the environment. In 1989, Sundarbans National Park, the core part of the biosphere reserve, was recognized as a World Heritage Site due to its unique ecosystem. The Sundarbans Biosphere Reserve was included in the global network of Biosphere Reserves in November 2001 as the second Biosphere Reserve from India after the Nilgiri Biosphere Reserve.

== Natural resources ==
=== Flora ===
The 4,263 square kilometer area of the biosphere reserve consists by dense forest and watersheds, known as reserved forest, and the forest contains mangrove trees. Other than reserved forest areas, other parts of the biosphere reserve contain mangroves as well as other plants, while reserved forest areas contain a variety of mangrove species. The main trees in the forest area are sundari and garan, but an abundance of garan trees is observed. Forms almost monotonous forest with hoglar bushes along the banks of rivers and watersheds.

=== Fauna ===
The Sundarbans Biosphere Reserve has 58 species of mammals, 55 species of reptiles and around 248 birds species. Bengal tiger are the largest apex predators that live in forests and have no predators of their own except humans and crocodiles. River beds and wetlands are home to gharials and crocodiles, but these species are listed as endangered species in the IUCN Red List. Most of the native mammal species of the area are in the forest, except for the locally extinct rhinoceros and wild buffalo.

== Bibliography ==
- Ghosh, Priyanka (October 2015). "Conservation and conflicts in the Sundarban Biospher Reserve, India". Geographical Review. 105 (4). American Geographical Society of New York: 429. Bibcode:2015GeoRv.105..429G. doi:10.1111/j.1931-0846.2015.12101.x. ISSN 1931-0846.
- Nath, Anirban; Samanta, Sourav; Banerjee, Saon; Danda, Anamitra Anurag; Hazra, Sugata (15 April 2021). "Threat of arsenic contamination, salinity and water pollution in agricultural practices of Sundarban Delta, India, and mitigation strategies". SN Applied Sciences. 3 (5). doi:10.1007/s42452-021-04544-1.
- Sahana, Mehebub; Areendran, Gopala; Sajjad, Haroon (2022). "Assessment of suitable habitat of mangrove species for prioritizing restoration in coastal ecosystem of Sundarban Biosphere Reserve, India". Springer Nature. 12 (1): 20997. Bibcode:2022NatSR..1220997S. doi:10.1038/s41598-022-24953-5. PMC 9723184. PMID 36470951.
- Mondal, Pinki; Trishna Dutta; Abdul Qadir; Sandeep Sharma (February 2022). Radar and optical remote sensing for near real-timeassessments of cyclone impacts on coastal ecosystems (Technical report). Remote Sensing in Ecology and Conservation. pp. 506–520.
- Samanta, Sourav; Hazra, Sugata; Mondal, Partho P.; Chanda, Abhra; Sandip, Giri; French, Jon R.; Nicholls, Robert J. (2021). "Assessment and Attribution of Mangrove Forest Changes in theIndian Sundarbans from 2000 to 2020". Remote Sens. 13 (24): 4957. Bibcode:2021RemS...13.4957S. doi:10.3390/rs13244957.
- Mitra &, Sangita; Roy Chowdhury, Mahua (26 November 2018). "Possible range decline of Ganges River Dolphin Platanista gangetica (Mammalia: Cetartiodactyla: Platanistidae) in Indian Sundarban". Journal of Threatened Taxa. 10 (13): 12738–12748. doi:10.11609/jott.3746.10.13.12738-12748. ISSN 0974-7907.
