= Environmental impact of development in the Sundarbans =

Environmental impact of development in the Sundarbans, is the study of environmental impact on Sundarban, the largest single tract mangrove forest. It consist of a geographical area of 9,629 square kilometres (3,718 sq mi), including 4,185 square kilometres (1,616 sq mi) of reserve forest land, and is a natural region located partly in southern Bangladesh and partly in the Indian state of West Bengal. It is ecologically a southern part of the Gangetic delta between the Hooghly river in India on the west and the Meghna river in Bangladesh on the east and is bounded by the Ganga-Padma, the Padma-Meghna on the north and by the Bay of Bengal on the south. The area that is not reserve forest land is inhabited by human settlements with a total population around 4 million (2003).

== Background ==
The Sundarbans is also a UNESCO World Heritage Site. The area covered by mangroves has fallen over the years due to anthropocentric development but is now protected by various legal mandates. The forest is renowned for its wide variety of wildlife, especially the critically threatened Royal Bengal Tiger. Besides providing a number of ecosystem services, the Sundarbans also contributes to the socio-economic development of the neighboring communities and the country. However, recent developments in the area has been found detrimental to its ecological balance by some parties.

== Ecological value of the Sundarbans ==
The Sundarbans is the largest single block of tidal halophytic mangrove forest in the world. It is intersected by a complex network of tidal waterways, mudflats, and small islands of salt-tolerant mangrove forests. A variety of habitats have developed to accommodate the wildlife, including beaches, estuaries, permanent and semi-permanent swamps, tidal flats, tidal creeks, coastal dunes, back dunes and levees. Besides a high number of mangrove tree species, 200 additional plant species, more than 400 species of fish, over 300 species of birds, 35 species of reptiles, 42 species of mammals and countless benthic invertebrates, bacteria, fungi, etc., can be found there. Some of the notable wildlife species residing in the forest include water fowl, heron, pelican, spotted deer, rhesus macaques, wild boar, tigers, water monitor lizards, fishing cats, otters, olive ridley turtles, crocodiles, batagur terrapins, and migratory birds. The Sundarbans also provide a vital buffer against cyclones that are common in that part of the world and has been called "a natural safeguard...for nearly 40 million people".

== Historical overview of Sundarban's development ==
The Sundarbans were very sparsely populated until the 19th century. There is evidence of only scattered human settlements dating back to the 8th century. The 19th century saw the start of permanent human habitation being established in the area, through the clearing of the forest in low-lying tracts and the construction of circuit embankments. This is likely to have been instigated in 1771 by the plan of a British collector general to divide the Sundarbans into plots and to lease them out to prospective landlords for timber extraction and the collection of revenues. The landlords brought in poor farming communities from parts of Bengal as well as neighboring states to clear the forest and start developing the land. In the timespan of a hundred years after the plan was initiated, the northern border of the mangrove forest shifted by about 10–20 km to the southeast. By 1876, the British government declared all mangrove areas that had not yet been leased, as under protection and conservation. However, more so than regulations, it is suspected that economic reasons such as the high cost of land conversion due to the tidal and saline environment as well as the presence of the Royal Bengal Tiger, are the main reasons for preventing the destruction of the mangroves. The clear demarcation of forest boundaries along rivers and the Bay of Bengal is also credited for the protection of the forest.

Despite these regulations, between 1873 and 1968, the mangrove-covered area of the forest decreased by about half because of conversion of forest to agricultural land and settlements. This can be attributed to mass migration to the Sundarbans after the end of colonial rule and the creation of India and Pakistan as two separate states. It resulted in the mangrove forest boundary shifting further to the south and area between the Hooghly River and the Matla River being cleared. However, after Bangladesh was formed in 1971, and various wildlife and forest protection legislations were established by the country in 1972, the Sundarban mangroves have been protected by legal measures primarily established to protect and help increase the threatened tiger population. As a result, despite the growing population density in the years since then, the total area covered by mangroves has remained fairly stable since the 1960s.

== Culture and livelihood of Sundarban residents ==
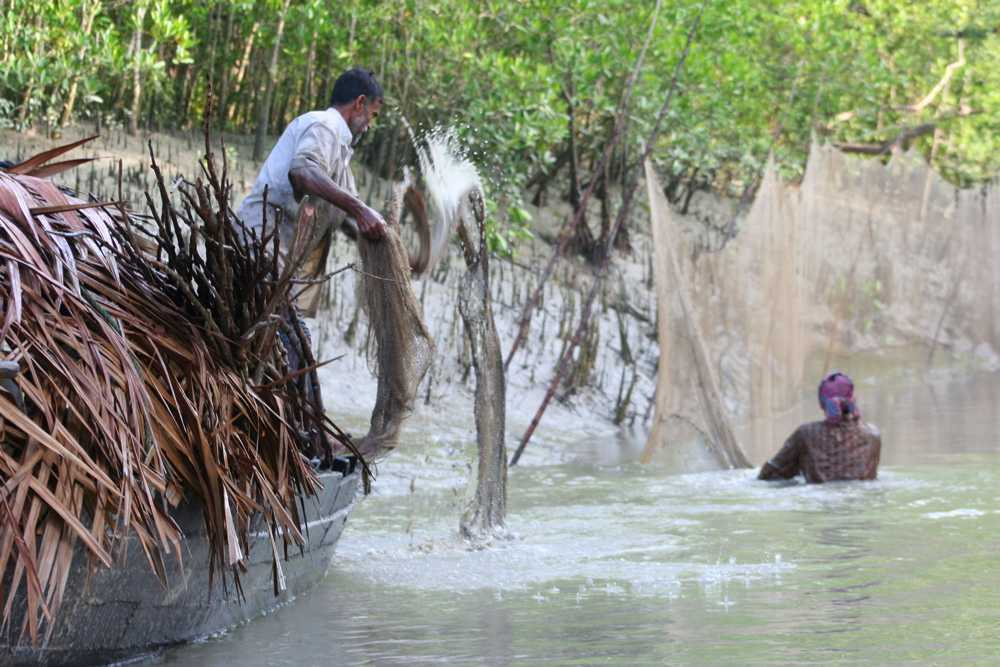
Illegal fishing in the Sundarbans

Entire communities in the Sundarbans depend directly on the forest and its waterways for their livelihood, from fisheries to honey production. Almost 85 percent of the people living in Sundarban are dependent on agriculture. Socioeconomic status is heavily determined by possession of land. There is also a socio-economic divide in the fisherman community, due to only some of the fishermen owning boats and being able to obtain official fishing licenses.

The lives of Sundarban residents are frequently affected by human-animal conflicts; a few tiger and crocodile attacks every year are common. In 2008, six people are known to have been killed by tigers inside the Sundarban Tiger Reserve. Because of issues such as deaths and injuries due to human-animal conflict, over-fishing, and deforestation, the state imposed several restrictions on livelihood strategies. The state forest department have tried to reduce the local people's dependency on the forest for their livelihood by taking on infrastructure development projects such as building roads and jetties, excavating irrigation channels and ponds, providing solar lamps and establishing a few medical facilities. Studies have shown that majority of population understand and support the conservation of mangroves and it ecosystems. However, perceived socio-demographic factors such as severe poverty, lack of political commitment, and absence of community level institutions are often barriers to the successful implementation of conservation policies.

In terms of transport and communications, Sundarban is still a recognized backwards area. Current number and quality of infrastructure facilities like agro-service centres, fishing harbors, boat building facilities, ice plants or cold storages, are inadequate to meet the requirements of developmental activities.

== Recent threats to the environment ==
The Sundarbans is very vulnerable to a variety of anthropogenic activity, including intensive boating and fishing, dredging, tourism and port activities, operation of mechanized boats, excavation of sand from the riverbed, and the establishment of coal power plants. There are a number of endangered species in the Sundarbans, including two river dolphins and an endemic bird, the masked finfoot, which are even more at risk because of these environmental threats. The current threats to the ecosystem could also affect the dwindling number of Royal Bengal Tigers in Bangladesh's side of the forest.

=== Tourism ===
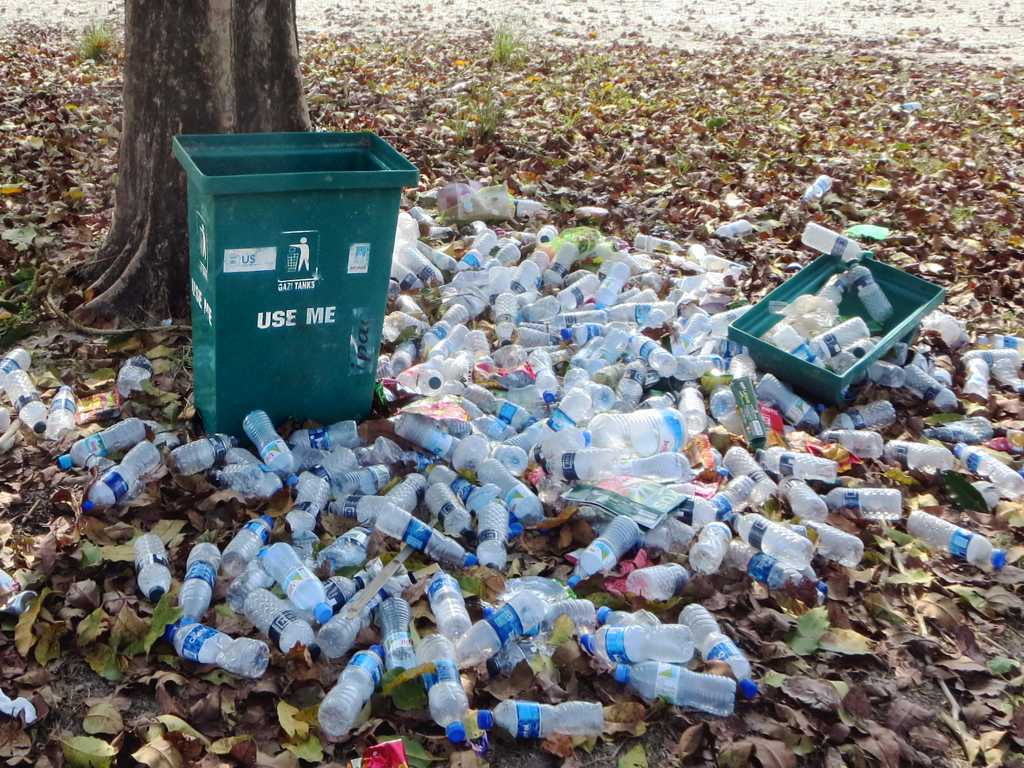
Litter on the Jamtola Tourist Trail in Sundarban National Park

The tourism industry has become very successful in the Sundarbans, with annual visitation increasing from around 50,000 in 2002 to around 117,000 in 2010. One of the main attractions for tourists is the Royal Bengal Tiger, which is widely used in advertising. Although the growing tourism business benefits the local economy, it has proven detrimental to the natural environment of the Sundarbans due to habitat destruction for hotel construction, pollution by garbage disposal, poor sanitation, and noise caused by mechanized boats. Uncontrolled tourism is likely to lead to more boardwalk construction and erosion of peat banks, which will result in changes in substrate structure, seedling distribution, faunal diversity, and species composition.

==== Safer alternatives ====
In order to reduce the harmful effects the current tourism industry has on the environment, eco-tourism is being encouraged in the Sundarbans. One of the benefits of eco-tourism is that is a pro-poor industry, i.e. the poor is one of its targeted beneficiaries. Due to Sundarban's residents' high dependency on the forest, an effective conservation strategy needs to provide the residents with income generation opportunities linked to forest protection. Eco-tourism is seen as both environmentally sustainable and economy boosting.

=== Power plants ===
One of the main threats to the Sundarbans currently are the two coal-fired power plants, proposed to be built within a few miles of the forest. One is a 630-megawatt plant called the Orion power plant, planned by the Orion Group. The Orion power plant proposal is preceded by the proposed Rampal power plant, a 1,320 megawatt project. The Rampal power plant is the product of a joint-venture called the Bangladesh-India Friendship Power Co. Ltd, a partnership between India's state-owned National Thermal Power Corp. and the Bangladesh Power Development Board. It will be Bangladesh's largest power plant and is expected to be built on over 1834 acres of land, 14 km from the Sundarbans.

The Rampal power plant is the most concerning and has received a lot of media attention. There is fear of the power plants altering the critical water balance in the Sundarban region, polluting the surrounding water and air, and increasing the risk of oil and coal spills. The Rampal project is in violation of the environmental impact assessment guidelines for coal-based thermal power plants. One of the 50 preconditions set by the Department of Energy of Bangladesh for such projects is that they must be outside a 25 km radius from the borders of an ecologically sensitive area, and this project clearly violates the condition. An UNESCO fact finding mission report concluded that the power station posed "a serious threat to the site".

==== Arguments made by environmental groups ====
The proposal states the plant will draw its water from the Passur River, taking up to 219, 600 cubic metres of water every day. Activists worry about the effect on local water supplies as that means the plant will discharge treated waste water back into the river. They argue that the pollutants introduced into the water supply can harm the mangroves, the marine animals living there, and nearby human communities who use the water body for fishing and agriculture. Environmentalists are also fearful of the increased chances of a catastrophic oil spill. There is historical evidence of the damage that can cause in the Sundarbans. In 2014, when an oil tanker spilled 75,000 gallons into the fragile ecosystem, locals communities had no tools or assistance from the government to fight the toxic spill with.

In 2013, a long march, with 20,000 protesters, failed to persuade the government to end the project. Another long march took place for the same purpose on March 10, 2016. Anu Muhammad, one of the head march organizers, claims "No sensible person will deny that there are many alternative ways for electricity generation. But there is no alternative for the Sundarbans."

==== Arguments made by government ====
The Bangladesh government has so far denied any potential detrimental effects on the Sundarbans due to the power plants. Ujjwal Bhattacharya, managing director of the Bangladesh-India Power Company, is quoted as saying "This project will usher in economic prosperity in the Rampal area ... which will reduce dependency of the local population on the Sundarbans. This will rather help the government ... to save the Sundarbans." The Bangladesh Prime Minister's energy advisor said that the controversy over the power plant and its impact on the Sundarbans was "not based on facts". The government also asserted that they will be importing high quality coal, building a 275-metre-high (902 ft) chimney and employing state of the art technology among other steps to minimize impact on the Sundarbans. The Prime Minister's principal secretary has compared the Rampal power plant to the Barapukuria power station, saying that the Rampal plant will be using much more modern and environmentally friendly technology, even though the inferior Barapukuria power plant is not affecting the environment despite being located in a crowded area.

== See also ==
- Rampal Power Station (Proposed)
- Sundarbans
- Sundarban National Park
- Sundarban Tiger Project
