= Streptomyces sundarbansensis =

Scientific classification
- Domain: Bacteria
- Kingdom: Bacillati
- Phylum: Actinomycetota
- Class: Actinomycetia
- Order: Streptomycetales
- Family: Streptomycetaceae
- Genus: Streptomyces
- Species: S. sundarbansensis

Binomial name
- Streptomyces sundarbansensis Arumugam et al. 2011

Type strain
- DSM 42019, MS1/7, MTCC 10621

Species of bacterium

Streptomyces sundarbansensis is a bacterium species from the genus of Streptomyces which has been isolated from soil from a mangrove forest from the Lothian Island in India. Streptomyces sundarbansensis produces 2-allyloxyphenol.

== See also ==
- List of Streptomyces species
