= Haliday Island Wildlife Sanctuary =

Wildlife sanctuary in West Bengal, India

Coordinates: 22.6647°N 88.6320°E

- IUCN category IV (habitat/species management area)
- Interactive map of Haliday Island Wildlife Sanctuary
- Location: West Bengal, India
- Area: 5.95 km^{2} (2.30 sq mi)
- Established: 1976

The Haliday Island Wildlife Sanctuary (also just known as the Haliday Wildlife Sanctuary) is one of several wildlife sanctuaries in the nation of India. Located in the state of West Bengal, the area is approximately six square kilometers in size. It is a part of the 'Sundarbans Biosphere Reserve', with the Sundarbans region as a whole becoming a 'Biosphere Reserve' officially in 1989. The wildlife-heavy areas there are regarded as an environmentally-minded tourist destination.

Situated on the river Matla, many different types of flora and fauna exist within the wildlife sanctuary. Examples include spotted deer and wild boar. Bengal tigers have occasionally visited the area as well.

== See also ==
- Administration of the Sundarbans
- Lothian Island Wildlife Sanctuary
- Sundarbans National Park
- Wildlife sanctuaries of India
