= Rampal Power Station =

Coal-fired power station in Bangladesh

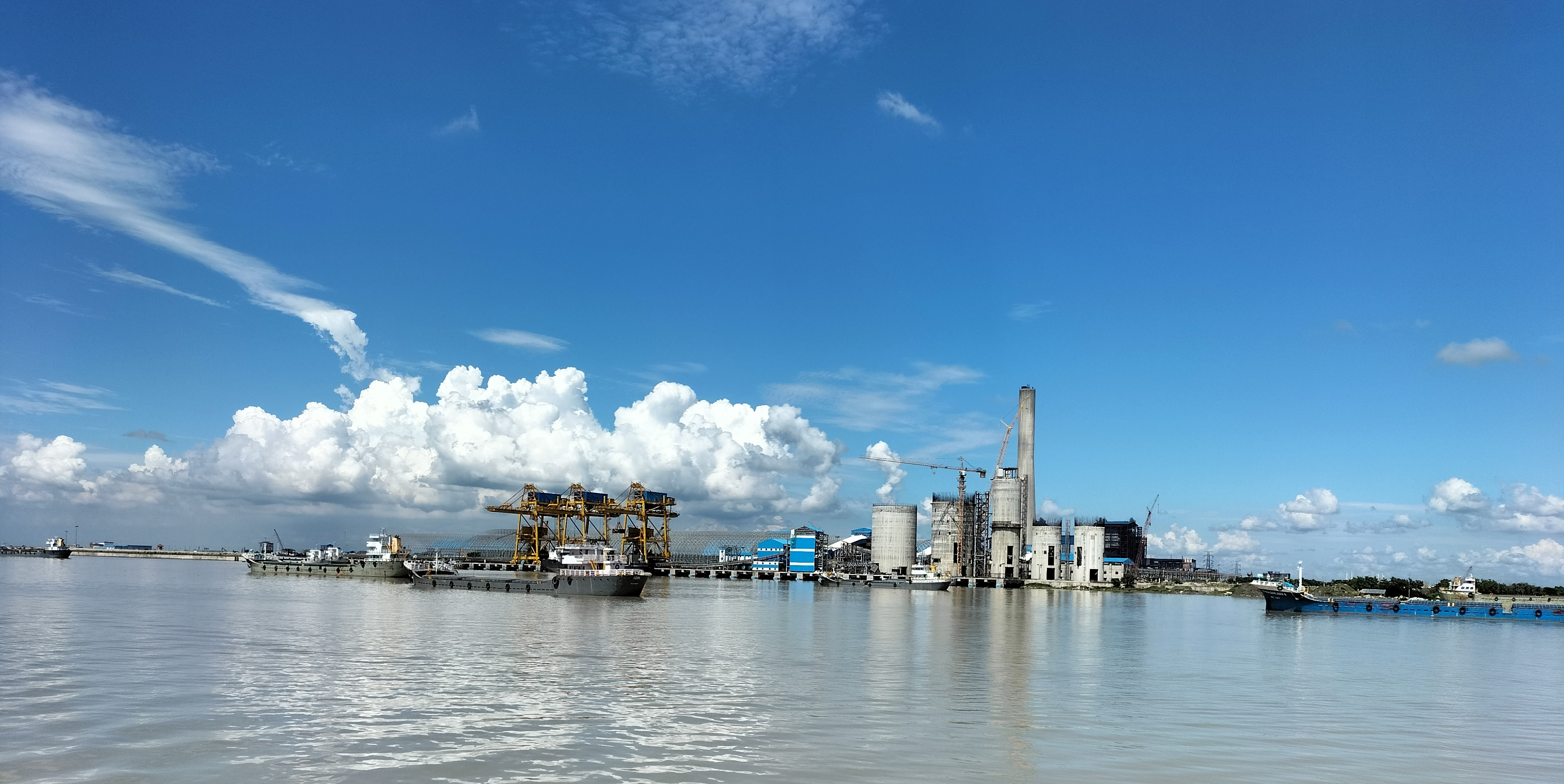
- Official name: Rampal Coal-fire Power Station
- Country: Bangladesh
- Location: Sapmari, Rampal Upazila of Bagerhat District
- Coordinates: 22°35′44″N 89°33′14″E
- Status: Under construction
- Construction began: July 2016
- Construction cost: ৳160 billion
- Owners: National Thermal Power Corporation (India) and Bangladesh Power Development Board (Bangladesh)

Thermal power station
- Primary fuel: Coal
- Site area: 7,421,935 m^{2} 1,834.000 acres

Power generation
- Nameplate capacity: 1320 MW

External links
- Commons: Related media on Commons

The Rampal Power Station (Bengali: রামপাল বিদ্যুৎ কেন্দ্র) is a 1320 megawatt coal-fired power station currently under construction at Rampal Upazila of Bagerhat District in Khulna, Bangladesh. The power plant, being constructed over 1834 acres of land, is situated 14 kilometres north of the world's largest mangrove forest Sundarbans, which is a UNESCO World Heritage Site. It will be the country's largest power plant.

It is being set up by BIFPCL (Bangladesh India Friendship Power Company Limited) which is 50:50 joint venture between India's state owned National Thermal Power Corporation (NTPC) and Bangladesh's Bangladesh Power Development Board (BPDB). BIFCPL awarded an EPC contract to Bharat Heavy Electricals Limited (BHEL) valued at over US$1.49 billion for setting up the Maitree Super Thermal Power Project (2X660MW). BHEL has started EPC activities and the first dispatch happened in January 2018.

== Capacity ==
The planned capacity of the power plant in 1320 MW (2x660 MW). Unit-1 with capacity to generate 660MW, is scheduled to be commissioned in October 2022.

Stage	Unit Number	Capacity (MW)	Date of Commissioning	Status
1st	1	660	Oct, 2022	Running
1st	2	660	--	Under progress

The Rampal Power Station did not operate in January 2023 and for 23 days in April 2023, because the government did not have the funding to purchase coal.

== Agreements ==
In August 2010, a memorandum of understanding was signed between the Bangladesh Power Development Board (BPDB) and India's state-owned National Thermal Power Corporation (NTPC) where they designated to implement the project by 2016. Consultation and planning were provided by the Fichtner Group in Stuttgart. On 29 January 2012, the Bangladesh Power Development Board signed an agreement with NTPC to build the plant. The joint venture company is known as Bangladesh India Friendship Power Company (BIFPC). The BPDB and the NTPC agreed to implement the project on a 50:50 equity basis. The NTPC will set up and operate the plant. Bangladesh and India will equally share up to 30 per cent of the capital of this project as equity. The remainder of the capital, which might be equivalent to US$1.5 billion, will be taken as bank loans with help from the NTPC. According to the sources in the Bangladesh Power Division, the joint venture company will enjoy a 15-year tax holiday.

== Environmental issues ==
This project violates the environmental impact assessment guidelines for coal-based thermal power plants. A 2016 Unesco report called the Environmental Impact Assessment questionable, and called for shelving the project.

On 1 August 2013, Department of Environment (DoE) of Bangladesh approved construction, but then changed its stance and set 50 preconditions for the project. But the location of the plant, 14 kilometres from the Sundarbans, violates one of the basic preconditions which says such projects must be outside a 25-kilometer radius from the outer periphery of an ecologically sensitive area.

Environmental activists contend that the proposed location of the Rampal Station would violate provisions of the Ramsar Convention. The Ramsar Convention, to which Bangladesh is a signatory, is an international environmental treaty for the conservation of wetlands. The Sundarbans are on Ramsar's list of wetlands of international importance.

The plant will need to import 4.72 million tons of coal per year. This massive freight will need about 59 ships each having 80,000-ton capacity that would be taken to the port on the bank of the Poshur river. The 40 kilometres from the port to the plant cuts through the Sundarbans and it includes the river flow path. Environmentalists say these coal-carrying vehicles are not often covered as they scatter large amounts of fly ash, coal dust and sulphur, and other toxic chemicals are released throughout the life of the project. Carrying large amount of coal through the shallow rivers also pose a threat as five vessels with load of coal, oil and potash sank in the nearby rivers from the time period of December 2014 to January 2017.

The plant would draw 219,600 cubic metres of water every day from the Poshur river, and discharge treated waste water back into that river causing pollutants to be introduced into the water supply to the detriment of the mangroves, the marine animals living there and nearby population.

The predictions made by environment and ecology experts are that the plant will release toxic gases such as carbon monoxide, oxides of nitrogen and sulphur dioxide, thereby putting the surrounding areas and, most importantly, Sundarban at grave risk.

According to a report published in New Age, in past few years the Indian central and state authorities which deal with environmental concerns in India denied the proposal of NTPC to set up a similar coal-fired thermal power plant at Gajmara in Gadarwara of Madhya Pradesh over a number of points. NTPC failed to get approval of the Indian Central Green Panel (Green Tribunal) in 2010 for the construction of that coal-fired thermal power plant because a vast portion of double-crop agricultural land reportedly comprised the site, a similar situation to Rampal.

=== Government position ===
The government of Bangladesh rejects the allegations that the coal-based power plant would adversely affect the world's largest mangrove forest. Tawfiq-e-Elahi Chowdhury, energy adviser of the Bangladeshi prime minister, said that the controversy over the power plant and its impact on the Sundarbans was "not based on facts". He also said that the plant will not negatively affect the mangrove forest because the emission of green house gas will be kept at the minimum level.

The government also claimed of importing high quality coal, build a 275-meter high chimney, employing state-of-the art technology and other steps to keep its impact on the Sundarbans at a negligible level.

== Opposition ==
On 1 March 2011, a bench of Bangladesh High Court asked the government "why the construction of the plant should not be declared illegal". Environmental experts have expressed concerns that the proposed plant at Rampal in Bagerhat might destroy the world's largest mangrove forest Sundarbans, a UNESCO world heritage site. Faridul Islam, chief coordinator of Save the Sundarbans, pointed out that the selected location of the project was only nine kilometers from Sundarban. About 2.5 million people depend on the Sundarban region, such as wood-cutters, fishermen, and honey hunters.

The National Committee on Protection of Oil, Gas, Mineral Resources, and Power-Port, environmentalist groups, bodies of the left-leaning parties and general people of Bangladesh vowed to resist the planned inauguration of the Rampal Power Plant scheduled on 22 October 2013. On 24 September 2013 thousands of people in Bangladesh began a rally for 5 days and 400 kilometres to oppose the power plant. Their march began in the capital city of Dhaka but slowly went to the world's largest mangrove forest,"Sundarban". As of 30 June 2016, with construction yet to begin, UNESCO had scheduled a meeting for 11 July to decide whether to declare the Sundarbans a "World Heritage Site in Danger," its strongest possible signal to the two governments and to international lenders that the plant should not be built.

Educationist Anu Muhammad and politician Manisha Chakraborty also opposed to Rampal power plant mentioning that 40 million people will be adversely affected by this power plant.

In India too there has been some fragmented opposition of the power plant. In his interview with Siddharth Sivakumar of the Indian cultural website Tinpahar, Shayan Chowdhury Arnob said on this issue, "The Rampal Power Plant might become the biggest Power Plant, but it would cost the world its largest mangrove forest, the Sundarbans. Sundarbans has its life in numerous intertwined organic chains. When a chain is broken everything would fall apart, one after the other. Money has nothing to do with development or happiness; it's about our attitude to life". In a press conference in New Delhi, India, social and civil society activists from Narmada Bachao Andolan's National Alliance of People's Movements wrote an "open letter" to Indian Prime Minister Narendra Modi on 18 October 2016, appealing to him to withdraw support for the plant saying that it might cause irreparable damage to the Sundarbans in Bangladesh.

On 18 January 2017 in the 47th annual meeting of the World Economic Forum (WEF) in Davos of Switzerland, former vice-president of the United States, Al Gore urged Prime Minister Sheikh Hasina to stop building the coal powered plant close to the largest mangrove forest, Sundarbans.

At least 10 activists from various organisations have been admitted to Dhaka Medical College and Hospital, when police used tear gas and rubber bullets to break up the anti-Rampal protests in the Dhaka University area on 26 January 2017.

== See also ==
- Electricity sector in Bangladesh
- Environmental impact of development in the Sundarbans
- List of power stations in Bangladesh
