= Sundarban Honey =

Type of honey

- Geographical indication
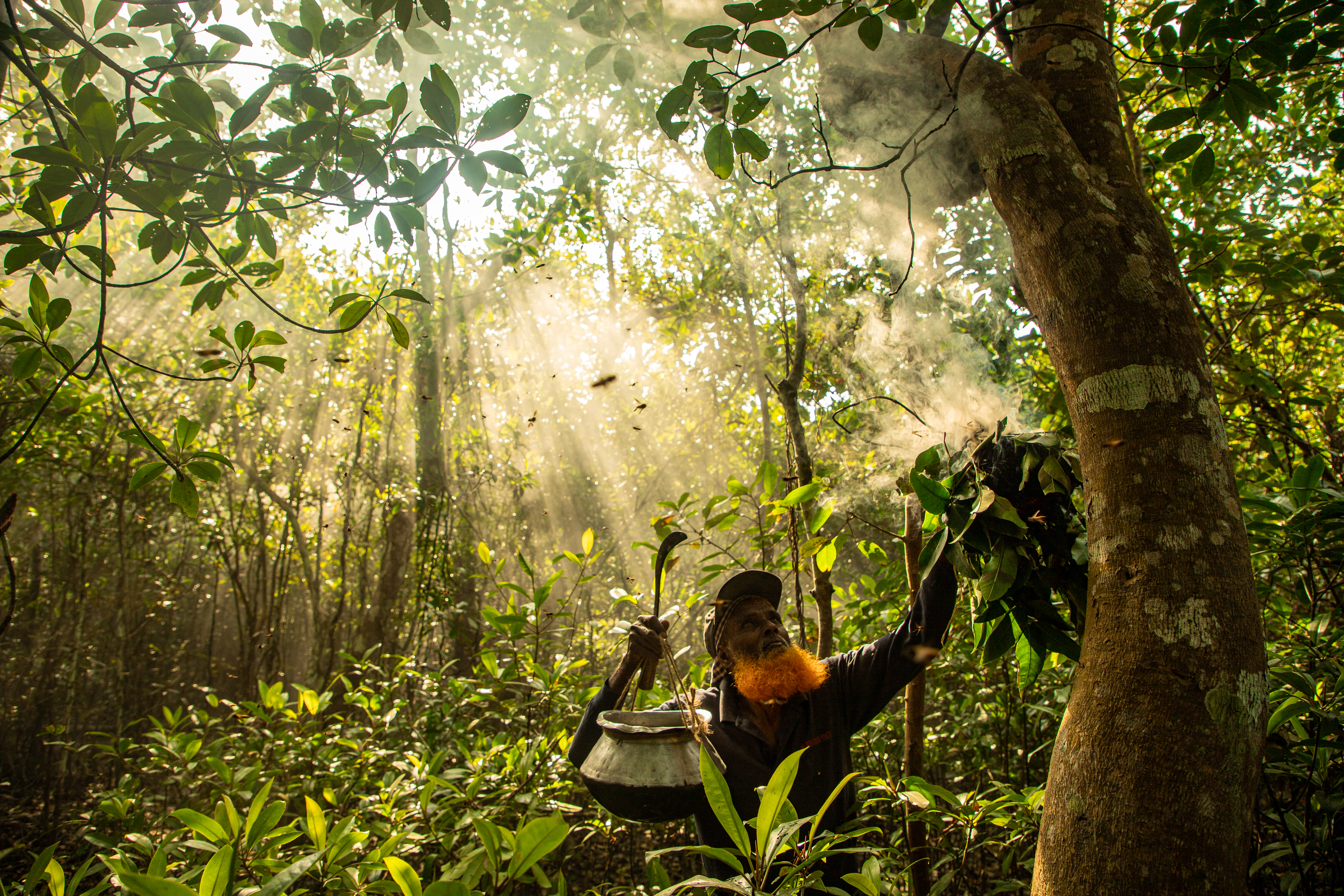
- Mouyal is collecting honey from the mangrove forest sundarban
- Alternative names: Padma modhu Mangrove honey
- Description: Sundarban Honey is a forest honey collected in Bangladesh & West Bengal
- Type: forest honey
- Area: Bagerhat, Khulna, Satkhira and North 24 Parganas, South 24 Parganas
- Country: Bangladesh, India
- Registered: 2025,2024

Sundarban Honey (Bengali: সুন্দরবনের মধু) is a honey from the Sundarbans, which is collected and processed in Khulna, Satkhira and Bagerhat districts of Bangladesh and South 24 Parganas and North 24 Parganas districts of West Bengal, India. Since 2024, the Sundarban Honey has been a registered Geographical indication, referring to the product collected and produced from the Sundarbans within South 24 Parganas and North 24 Parganas districts of West Bengal. Since 2025, the Sundarban Honey has been a registered Geographical indication, referring to the product collected and produced from the Sundarbans within Khulna, Bagerhat and Satkhira districts of Bangladesh ."Sundarban Honey" is golden in color, although red or dark brown honey is also available. This honey is collected by bees from the flowers of various plants within the Sundarbans and stored in the hives; moules or moulis (beekeeper) collect the honey directly from the deep forests of the Sundarbans.

Honey collectors or moules collect honey every year between March and May, when fishing is prohibited. Honey collection is a seasonal activity that starts from late March to early June. During this season, most of the mangrove flowers are full of nectar. This attracts rock bees (Apis dorsata) to visit Sundarbans in the month of Magh (January–February), spend their honey-cycle life there and leave it in the month of Ashar (July). Most of the hives in the Sundarbans are made by rock bees.

In real sense, extensive use and exploitation of the forest products of the Sundarbans, including Sundarban Honey, began by the East India Company. During those times, a large number of people had to depend on the collection of secondary forest products like honey and wax for their livelihood. They collected honey from the deep forests in small groups. Evidence of the use of this important forest product can be found in poems and chants (mantras).

== Recognition ==
=== Geographical Indication ===
West Bengal Forest Development Corporation Limited applied for Geographical Indication or GI rights for Sundarban honey in 2021. Geographical Indications or GI tag are issued in 2024 from Chennai office in India. According to the certificate received, the registration of the product will be valid till 11 July 2031.The Sundarbans spans 10,000 square kilometres, with 60 percent in Bangladesh and 40 percent in India according to the Forest Department. Bangladesh has been the primary extractor of honey, with 230 metric tonnes in 2022 and 300 metric tonnes in 2023. India's collection over the past seven years totals 137 metric tonnes. Bangladesh has also applied for Geographical Indications or GI rights. Since 2025, Sundarban Honey has been a registered Geographical indication, referring to the product collected and produced from the Sundarbans within Khulna, Bagerhat and Satkhira districts of Bangladesh.
