= Sajnekhali Wildlife Sanctuary =

Wildlife sanctuary in West Bengal, India

- IUCN category IV (habitat/species management area)
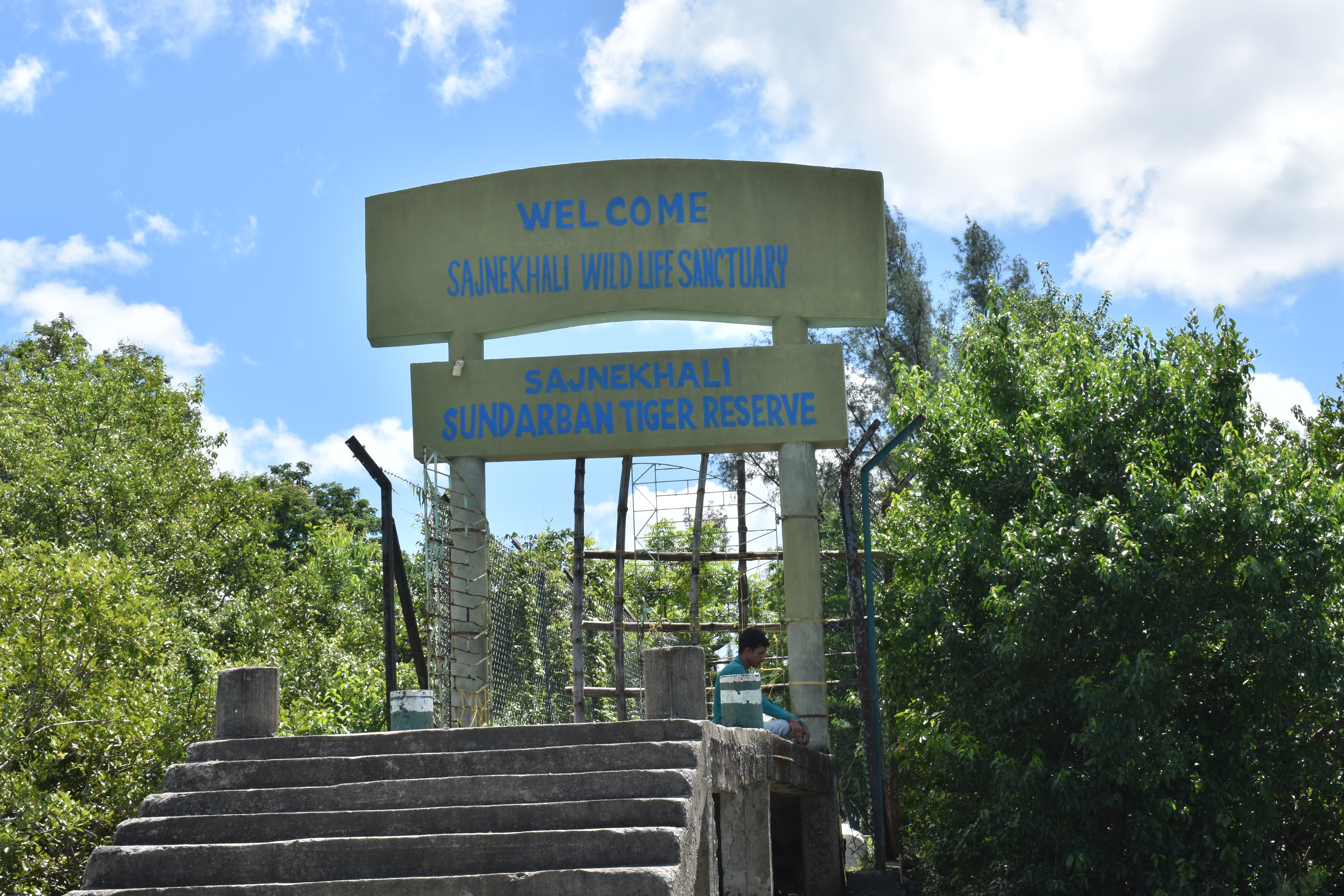
- Sajnekhali wildlife Sanctuary entrance

- Location within West Bengal Location within India
- Interactive map of Sajnekhali Wildlife Sanctuary
- Location: West Bengal, India
- Coordinates: 22°07′26″N 88°49′53″E
- Area: 362 km^{2} (140 mi^{2})
- Established: 1976
- Website: www.wildbengal.com/urls/pa_san_sajnekhali.htm

Sajnekhali Wildlife Sanctuary is a 362 km^{2} area in the northern part of the Sundarbans delta in South 24 Parganas district, West Bengal, India. It is located at the confluence of the Matla and Gumdi rivers. The area is mainly mangrove scrub, forest and swamp. It was set up as a sanctuary in 1976. It is home to a rich population of different species of wildlife, such as water fowl, heron, pelican, spotted deer, rhesus macaques, wild boar, tigers, water monitor lizards, fishing cats, otters, Olive ridley turtle, crocodiles, Batagur terrapins, and migratory birds. The ideal place for nature lovers to observe wild animals from a height is the Sajnekhali Watchtower.

== Transport ==
Sajnekhali is situated 130 km from Kolkata. Canning is the nearest railway station of it. Ferry service towards Sajnekhali is available from Gosaba. Rented boat or motor launch can be hired for Basanti or Gadkhali.

== Gallery ==
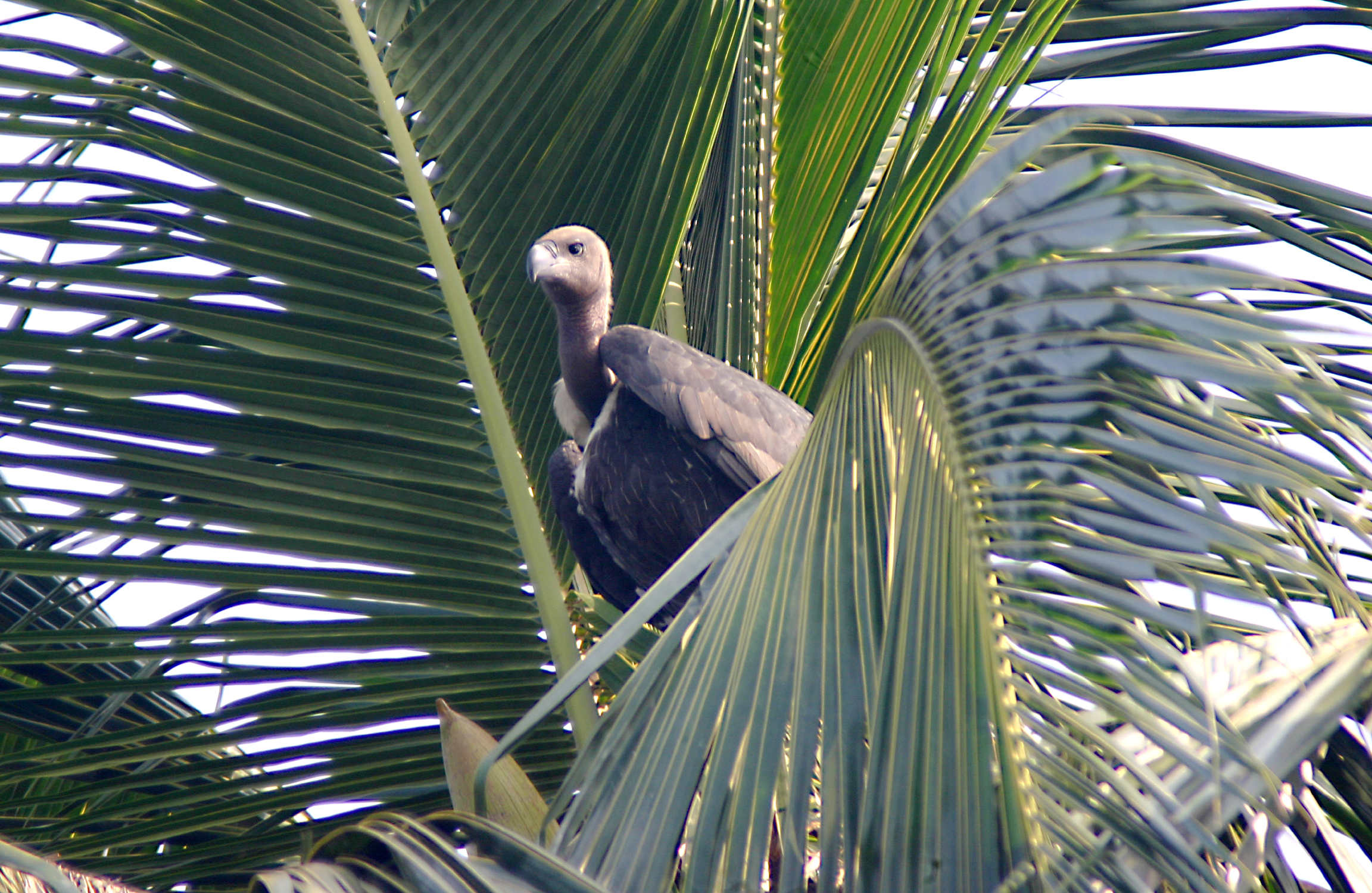
A white backed vulture (Gyps bengalensis) spotted at Sajnakhali Wildlife Sanctuary

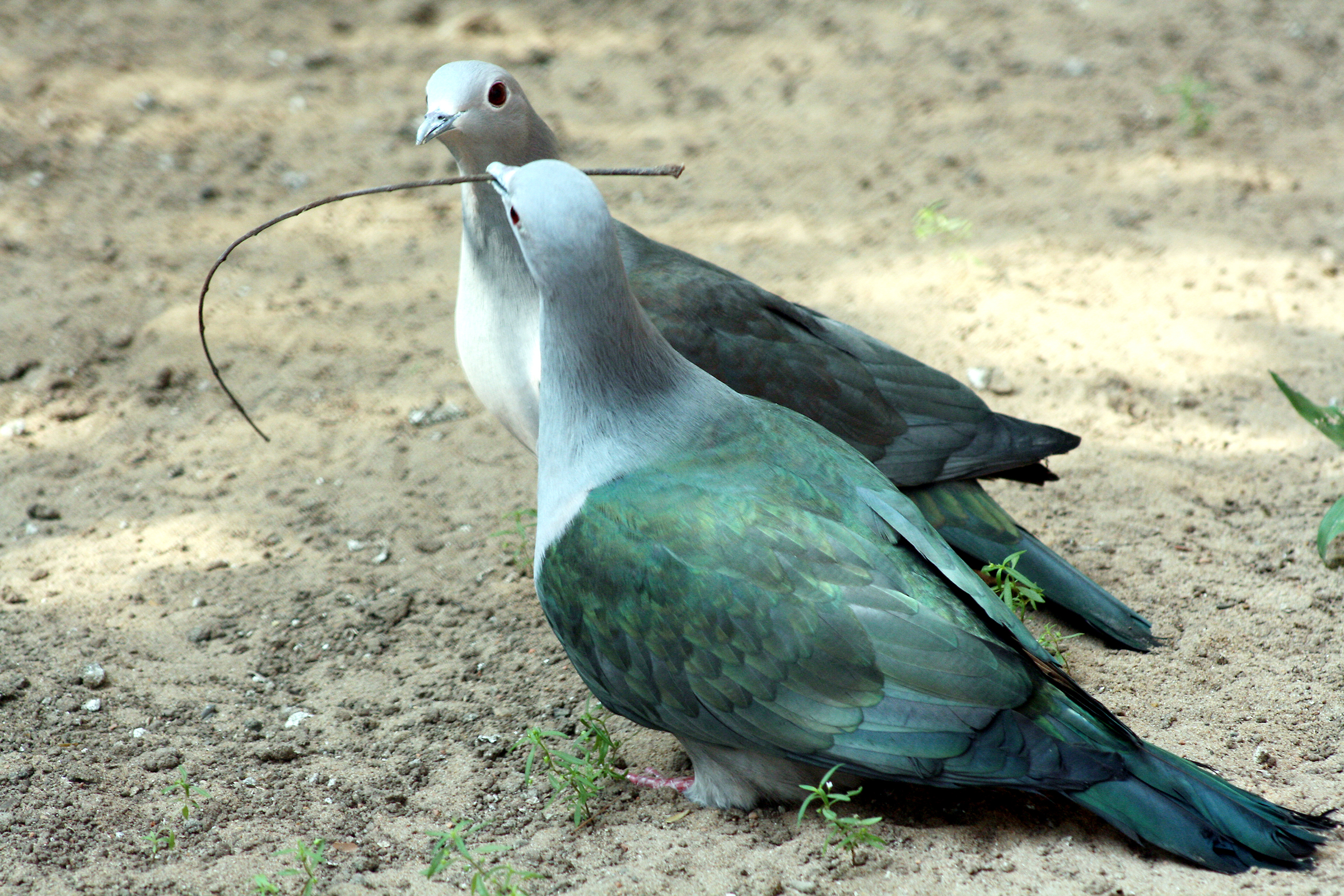
Imperial Green Pigeon (Ducula aenea) spotted at Sajnakhali Wildlife Sanctuary

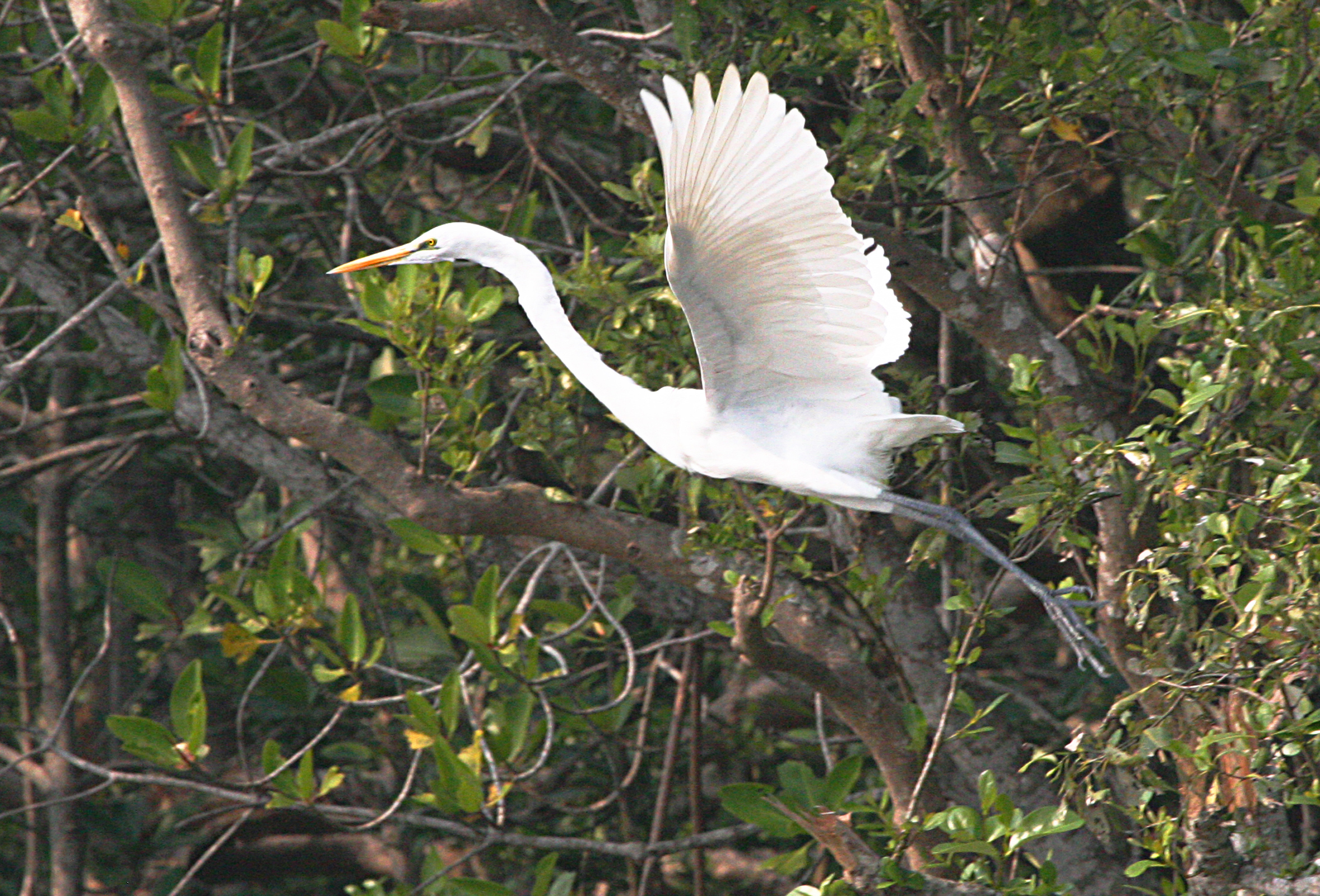
A Great Egret (Casmerodius albus) spotted at Sajnakhali Wildlife Sanctuary

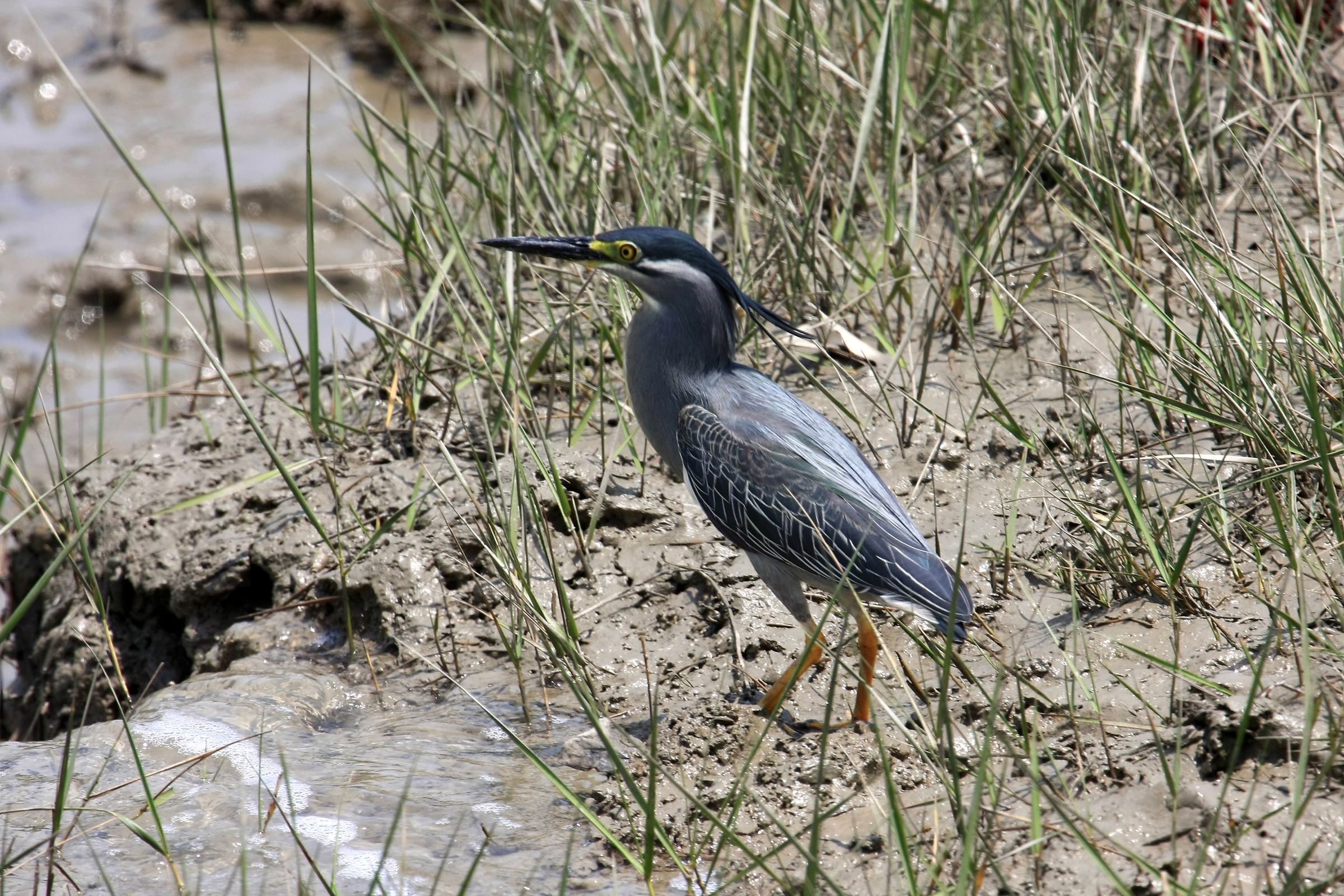
A Little Heron (Butorides striatus) spotted at Sajnakhali Wildlife Sanctuary

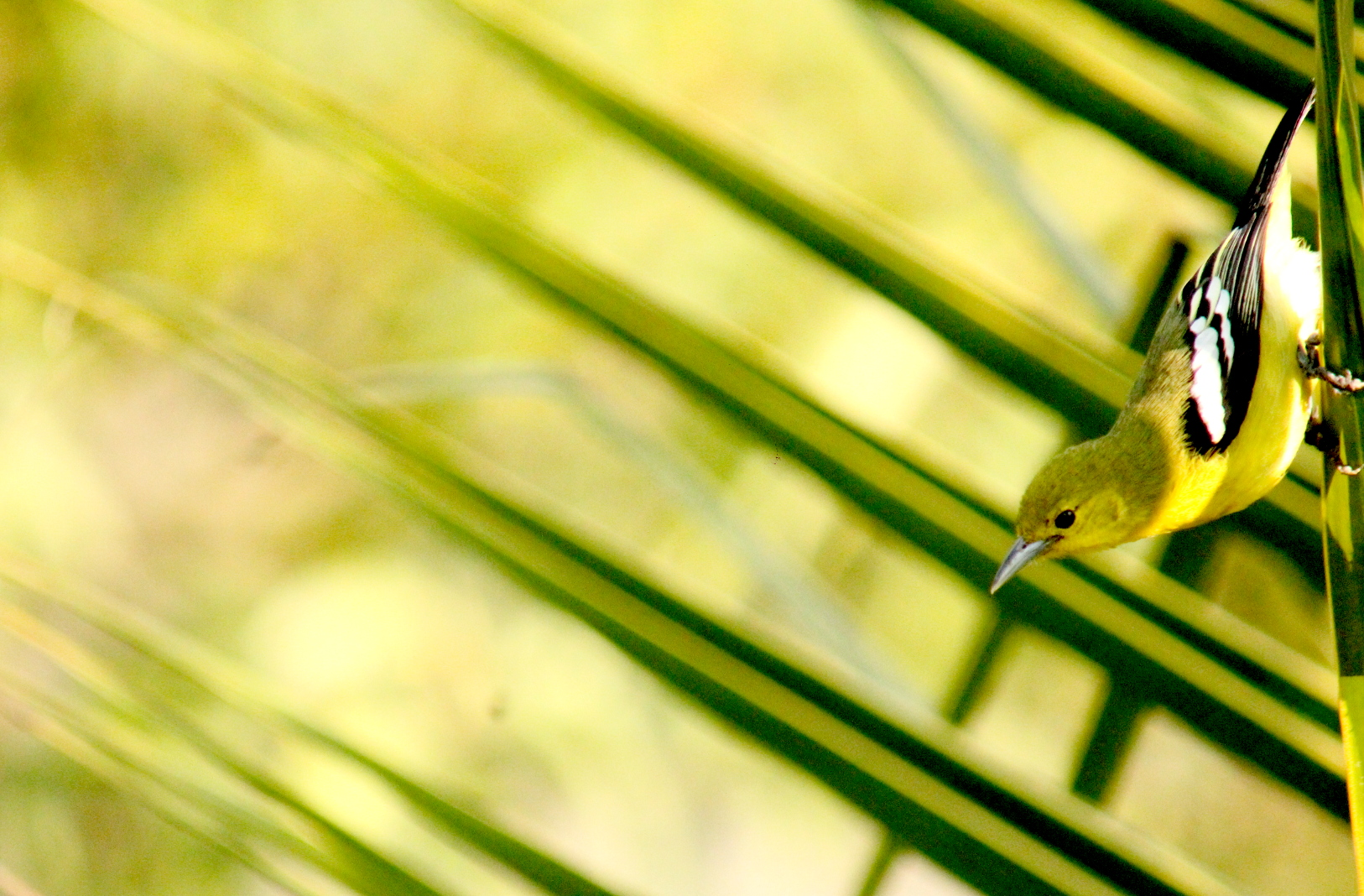
Common iora Female at Sajnakhali Wildlife Sanctuary

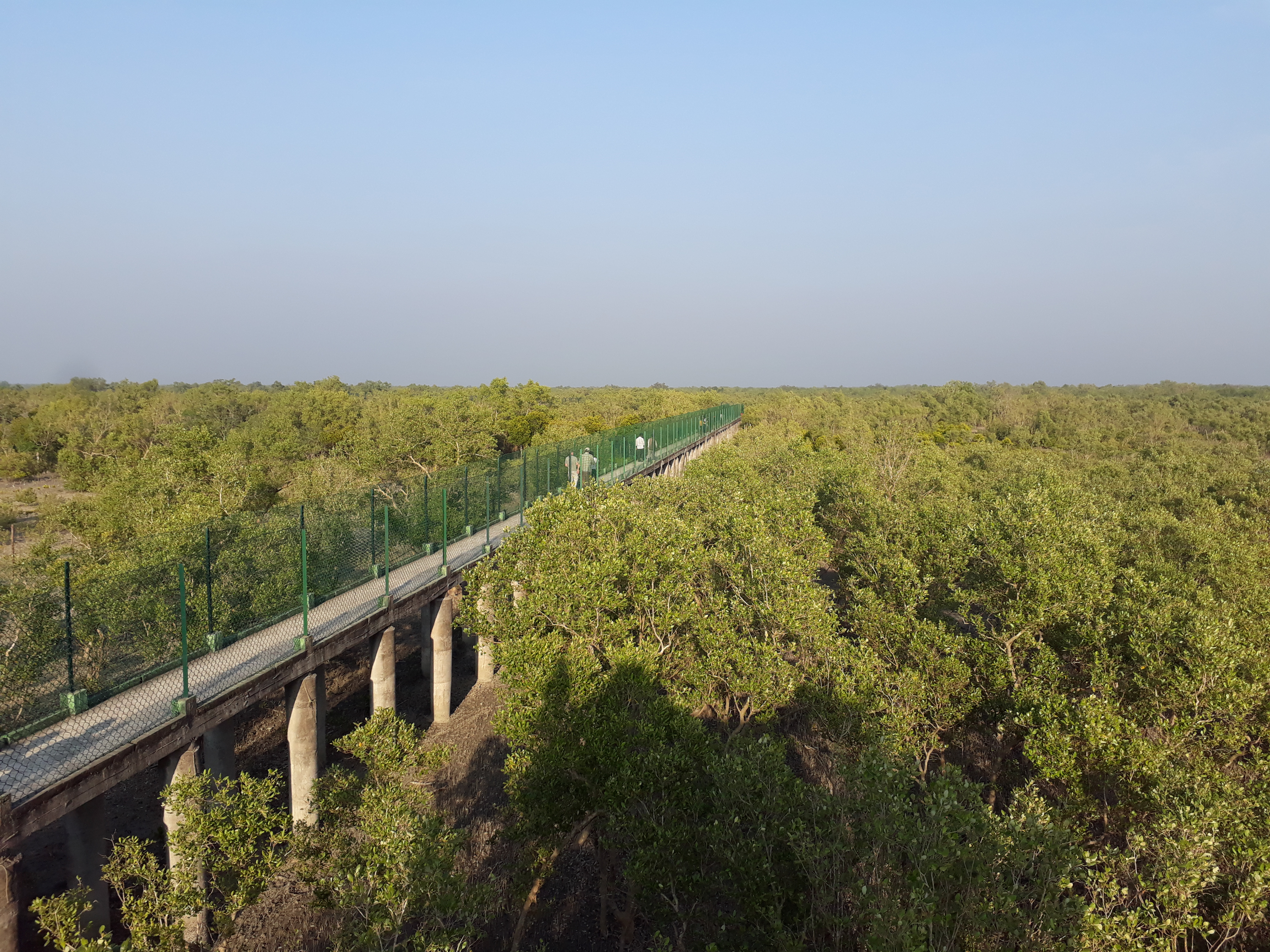
View of Sajnekhali sanctuary
