= Lothian Island Wildlife Sanctuary =

Indian wildlife sanctuary

- IUCN category IV (habitat/species management area)
- Location within West Bengal Location within India
- Interactive map of Lothian Island Wildlife Sanctuary
- Location: West Bengal, India
- Nearest city: Fraserganj
- Coordinates: 21°39′49″N 88°19′44″E
- Area: 38 km^{2} (15 mi^{2})
- Established: 1976

Lothian Island Wildlife Sanctuary is situated in South 24 Parganas district, West Bengal, India. The wildlife in this sanctuary includes estuarine crocodiles, olive ridley sea turtles, spotted deer, jungle cats and rhesus macaques.

The tropical wetland forest consists of mangrove vegetation that provides a dense cover along the habitat.
